= List of people named in the Epstein files =

People in files on Jeffrey Epstein

The Epstein files comprise over six million pages of documents detailing the activities of American financier and convicted child sex offender Jeffrey Epstein. So far about three and a half million files have been made public with redactions, among them 180,000 images and 2,000 videos.

This article lists people who cultivated relationships with Epstein, as evidenced in the released files and reported in reliable sources. Among others, they were professionals he hired; people who hired him; scholars he entertained and funded; powerful men and women; Silicon Valley elite, royalty, and political leaders who provided connections and companionship; people who wanted to stand close to the wealthy and connected; and lifelong friends.

The compilation of these names in this list neither establishes wrongdoing by those named nor should it be interpreted as evidence that the people listed are guilty of misconduct. Many people featured in the files deny any wrongdoing in relation to Epstein's life and crimes, and Ghislaine Maxwell remains the only person ever convicted of being a co-conspirator of Epstein.

== A ==
=== Stephen Alexander ===
Dr. Stephen Alexander was Epstein's court-approved sex-addiction doctor when Epstein was convicted in Florida in 2008, and at that time Epstein used Alexander to woo government and law enforcement officials. Alexander delivered Epstein's messages, and in return Epstein gave Alexander business opportunities, stock tips, and trips to Little Saint James over the subsequent years.

=== Woody Allen ===
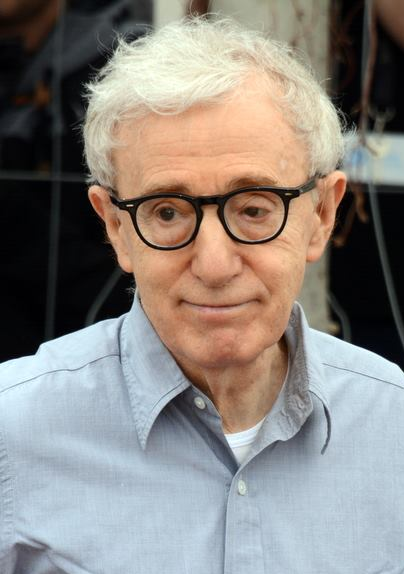
Woody Allen

Woody Allen was a guest at the townhouse from 2010 onward. He wrote a letter for Epstein's 63rd birthday. Photographs showed Allen and Epstein together, including on a private plane alongside Larry Summers. Emails showed Epstein helping Allen's daughter get into Bard College by connecting her to Leon Botstein.

=== Anil Ambani ===
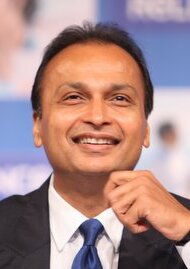
Anil Ambani

Anil Ambani and Epstein were introduced by Sultan Ahmed bin Sulayem, Ambani seeking White House connections. In March 2017, Epstein offered a tall Swedish blonde woman to Anil, who agreed. The day Modi secured re-election in 2019, Ambani visited the townhouse.

=== Eva Andersson-Dubin ===
Eva Andersson-Dubin was Epstein's girlfriend for 11 years before marrying Glenn Dubin. The Dubins flew on Epstein's planes at least 18 times between 1996 and 2005. In a 2010 email, Andersson-Dubin invited Epstein, saying her daughter "will have 5 friends over".

=== Dan Ariely ===
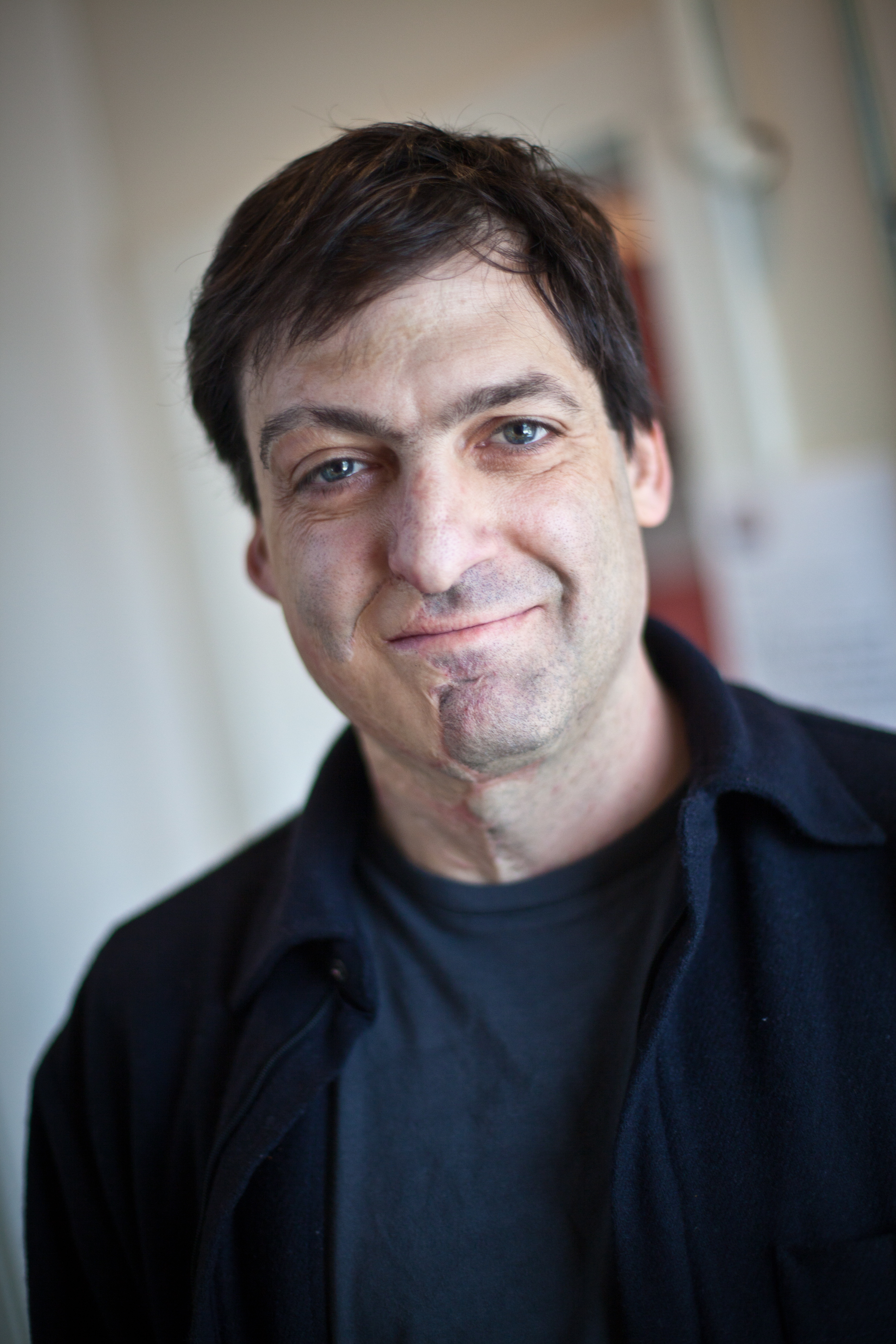
Dan Ariely

Dan Ariely had a longstanding relationship with Epstein. In one email from 2012 Ariely asked Epstein for the name and email of a "redhead" he met earlier.

=== Peter Attia ===
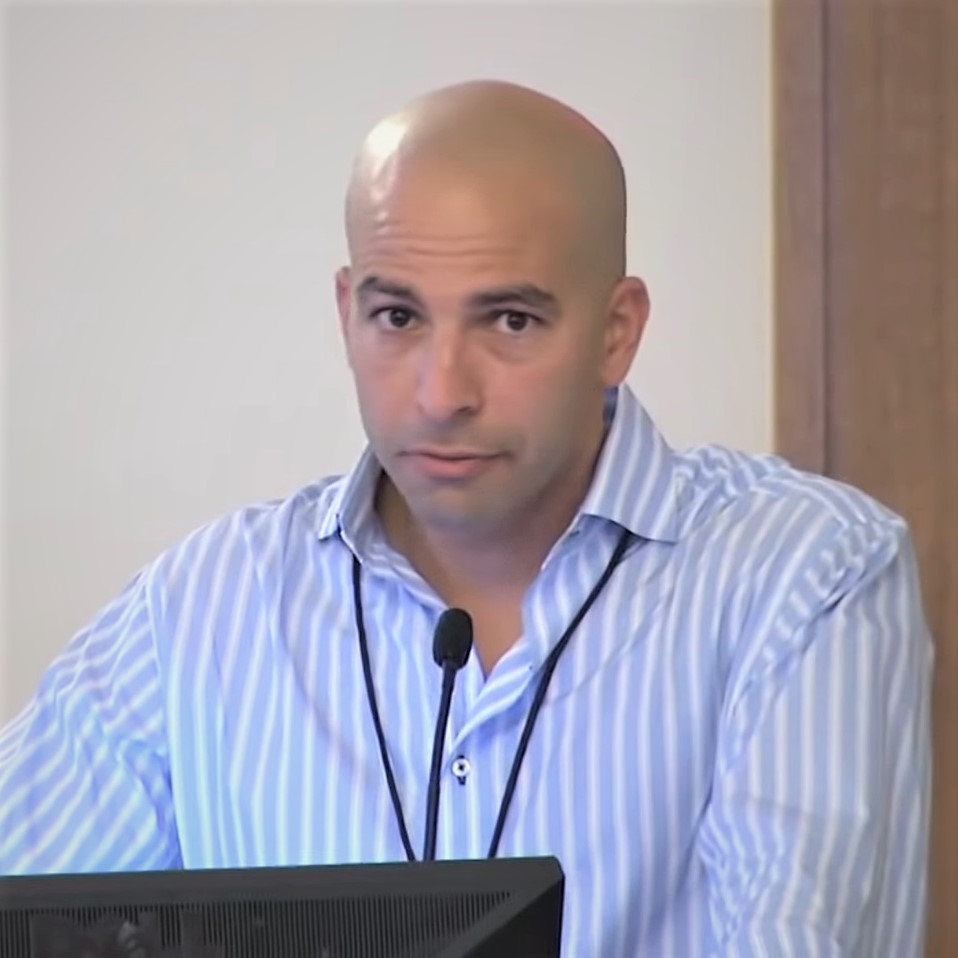
Peter Attia

Peter Attia's name appeared over 1,700 times in the files. In one email, Attia told Epstein: "the life you lead is so outrageous, and yet I can't tell a soul". Attia stepped down from his position as science officer for a protein bar manufacturer and lost his position as an advisor for a sleep tech company, and as a contributor to CBS News.

=== Richard Axel ===
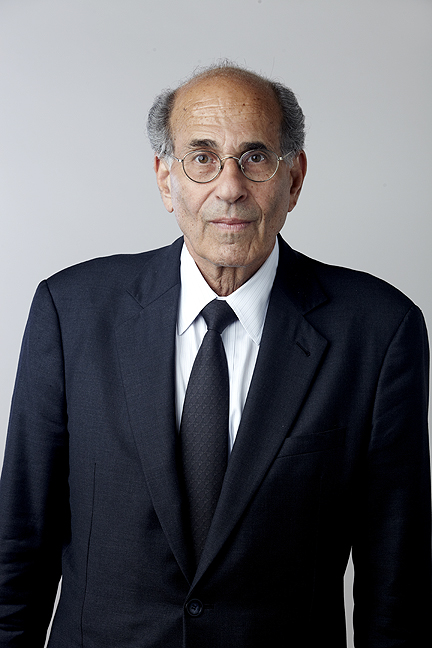
Richard Axel

Richard Axel is professor of biology at Columbia University who met Epstein in the 1980s. They corresponded from 2010 until 2019. Axel and his wife were invited to Epstein's island multiple times. Axel stepped down from his role at the Zuckerman Mind Brain Behavior Institute.

== B ==
=== Joscha Bach ===
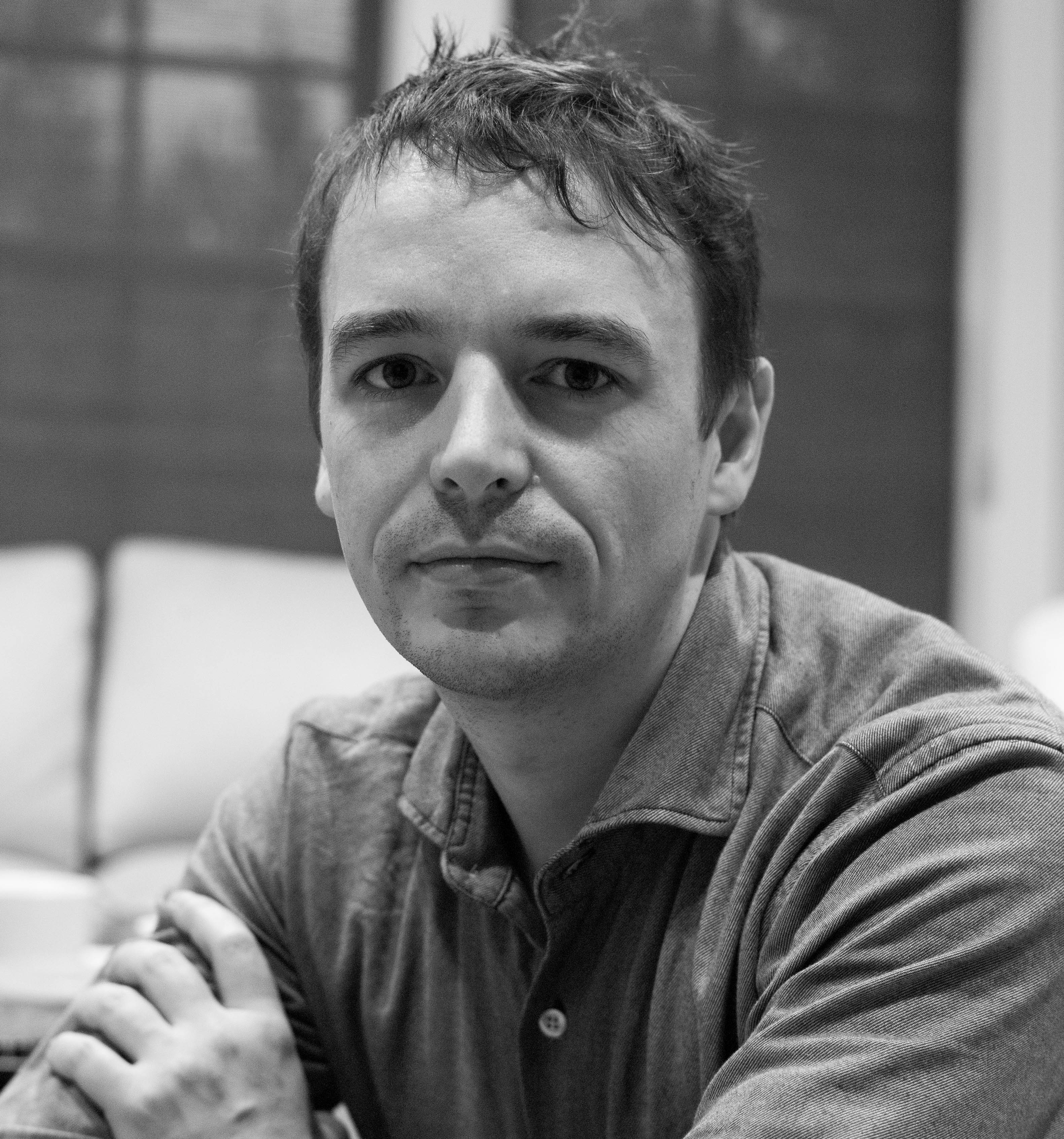
Joscha Bach

Joscha Bach is a cognitive scientist whose MIT Media Lab research has been subsidized by Epstein. Bach wrote to Epstein in 2016 that "black kids in the US have slower cognitive development" and that women "tend to find abstract systems, conflicts and mechanisms intrinsically boring". Bach stated he kept connected to Epstein after his conviction because academics recommended him as a funding source and vouched for his reformation.

=== Adam Back ===
Adam Back is a co-founder of blockchain company Blockstream. Back was invited by Epstein to his island in April 2014 and an email sent by Epstein to Amir Taaki indicated that Back visited the island. Epstein made a $500,000 investment in Blockstream through an investment fund he co-owned with Joichi Ito in 2014.

=== Doug Band ===
Doug Band is a former aide to Bill Clinton, whom he connected to Epstein. He exchanged flirtatious emails in 2002 with Maxwell. Maxwell and Epstein gifted Band a $35,000 Audemars Piguet watch in 2005; Band also flew on Epstein's private jet more than 35 times. In 2011, Band removed Maxwell from lists to Clinton-related events.

=== Steve Bannon ===
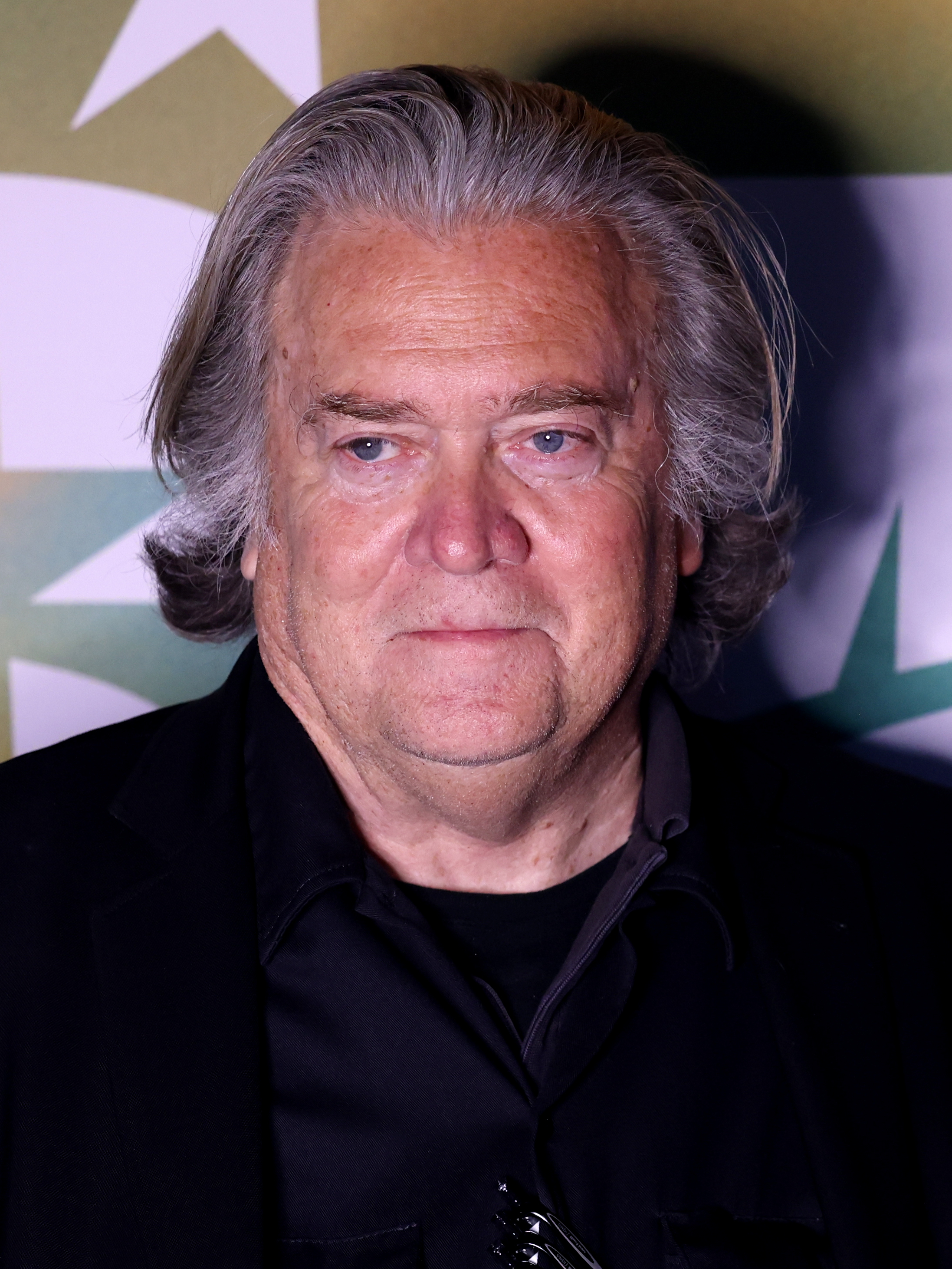
Steve Bannon

Pundit and former White House chief strategist Steve Bannon exchanged thousand of texts with Epstein. Epstein lent him multiple times the use of his Paris apartment, his Palm Beach house, and his plane; Bannon coached Epstein to face the early 2019 media. According to Politico, the files indicate Bannon had a relationship with Epstein after 2008. In 2019, Bannon discussed with Epstein opposition research on Pope Francis.

=== Ehud Barak ===
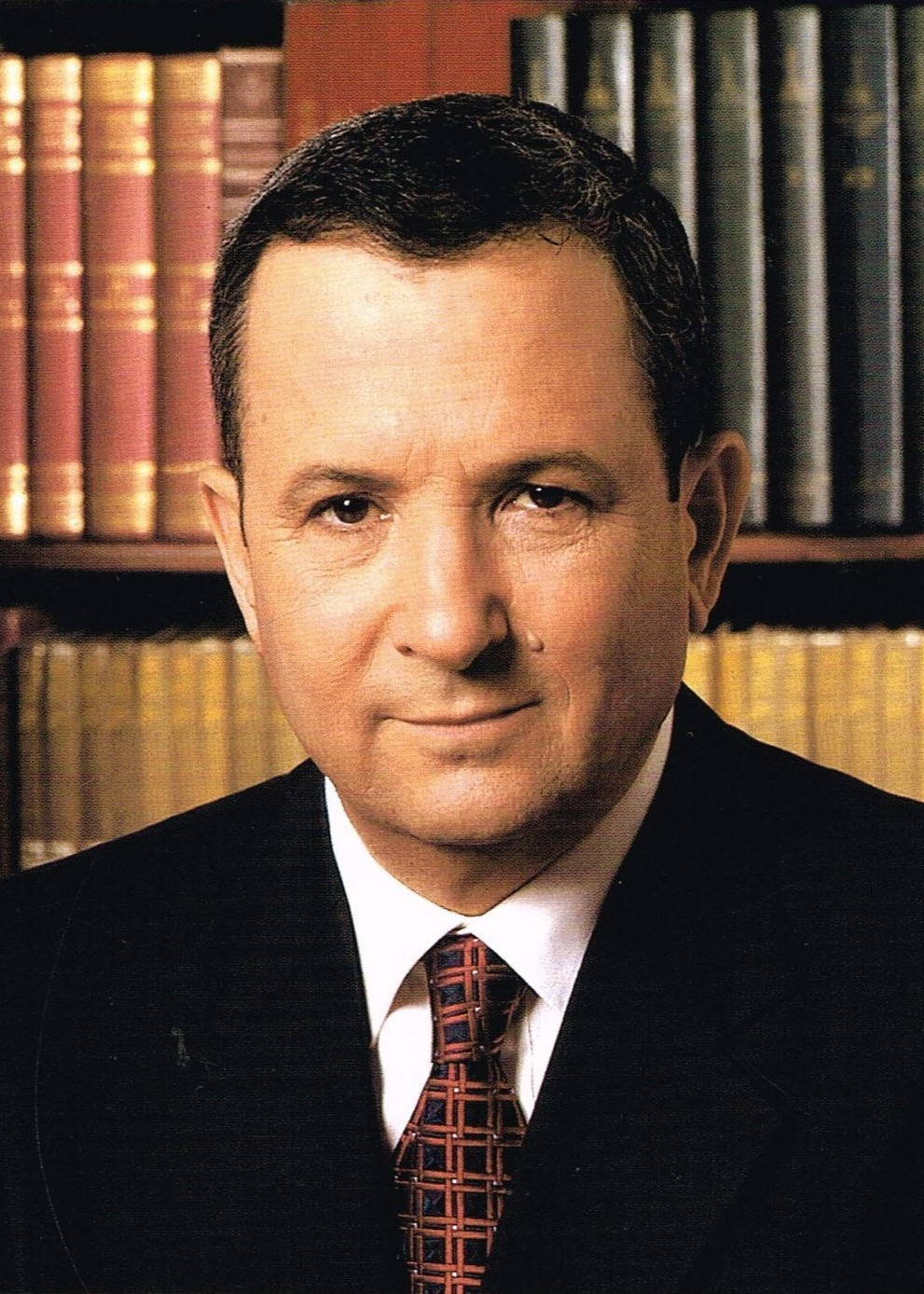
Ehud Barak

Ehud Barak is a former prime minister and Minister of Defense of Israel. Barak and Epstein regularly exchanged email communications, and met over 60 times between September 2010 and March 2019, including while Barak served as Minister of Defense of Israel. In a 2013 email chain where Barak told Epstein that Summers withdrew from the Federal Reserve chair race, Epstein scheduled Barak to meet with Ariane de Rothschild and some "kissinger [sic] china [sic] guy". In a 2013 recording, Epstein nudged Barak to work with Thiel's Palantir. In 2016, the Israeli government installed security equipment to a Manhattan building owned by his brother and managed by Epstein, for use by his associates and underage models; Barak frequented the building for extended stays.

=== Tom Barrack ===
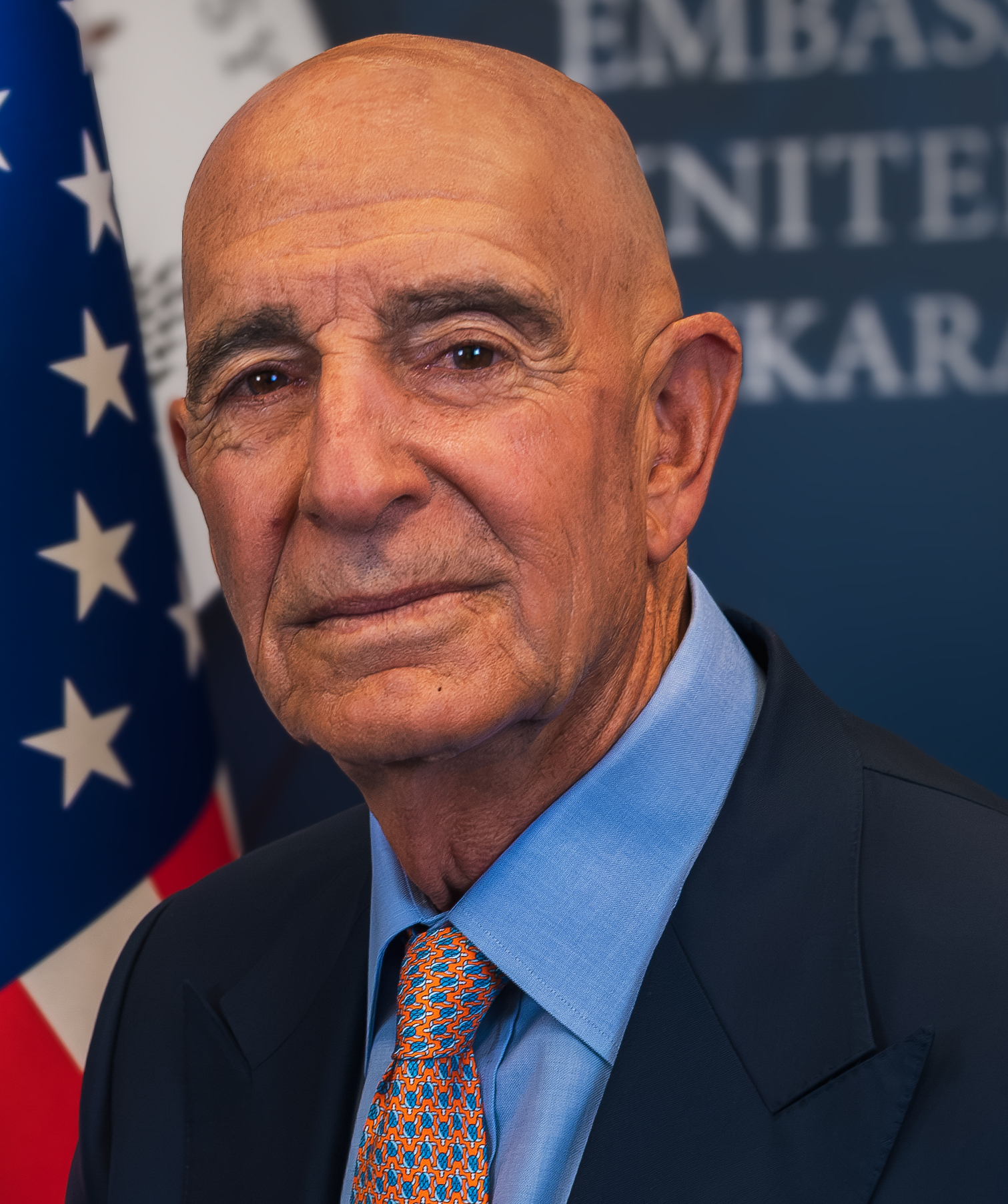
Tom Barrack

Tom Barrack is the United States Ambassador to Turkey and longtime Trump confidante. By the early 2000s, Barrack and Epstein had business ties to the Middle East. They invited each other, introduced each other to diplomats and investors, and discussed business opportunities. According to CBS News, Epstein facilitated introductions between Barrack and Thiel, Barak, and Churkin.

=== Sergei Belyakov ===
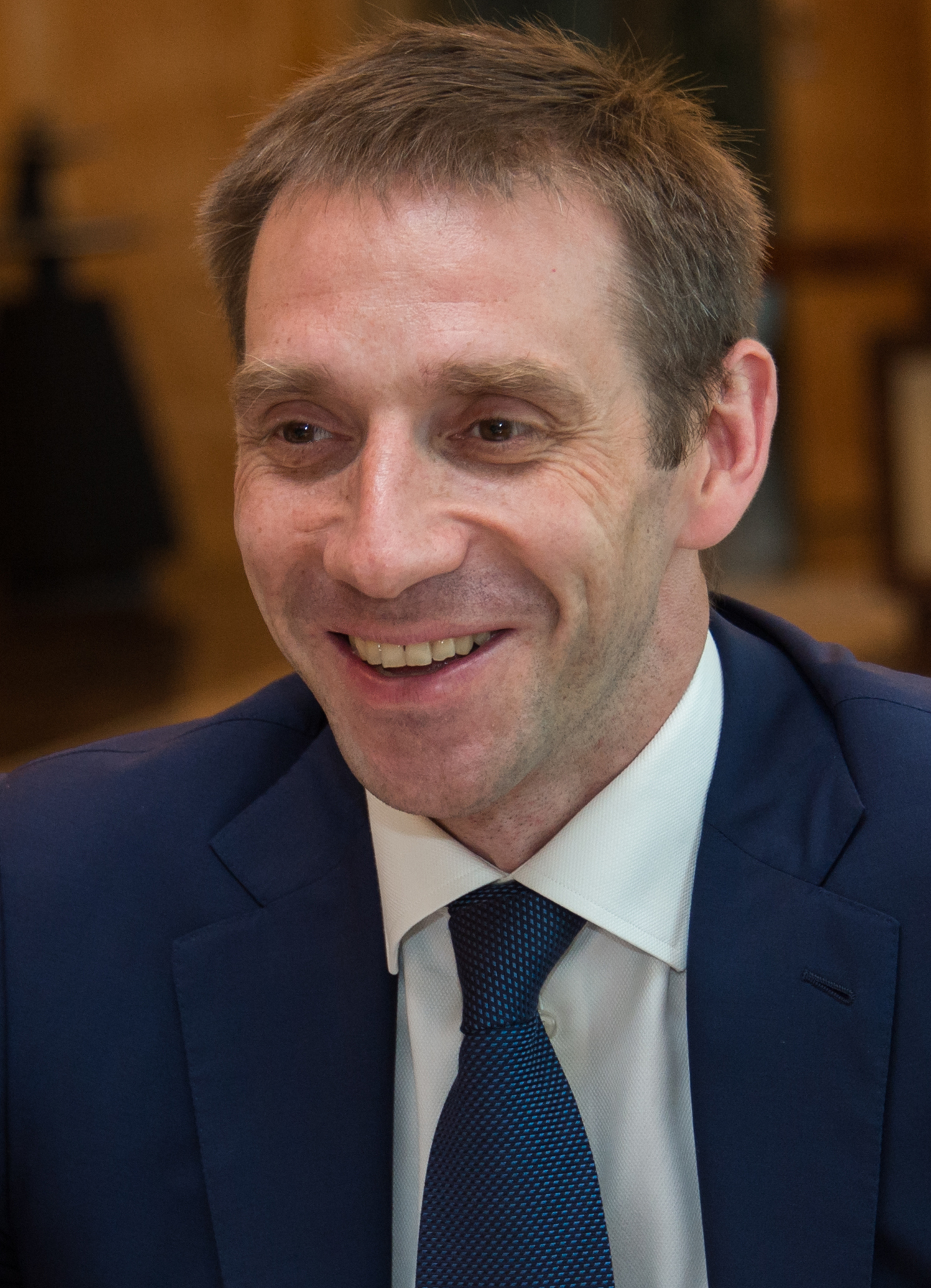
Sergei Belyakov

Sergei Belyakov is a former Deputy Minister of Economic Development of Russia. Epstein emailed Sergei Belyakov that a "Russian girl" was attempting to blackmail Leon Black. After a year of friendship, Belyakov helped arrange a three-year visa for Epstein's visits to Russia, and Epstein introduced him to Peter Thiel, Reid Hoffman, and Ehud Barak. After Belyakov began working with his country's sovereign wealth fund, he asked Epstein for investment advice.

=== Leon Black ===
Leon Black is an American private equity investor whom Epstein referred to as "Mr. Big" in emails. Weeks after Epstein's death, JPMorgan Chase filed a suspicious activity report for transactions conducted by Black, Dubin, Dershowitz, and Wexner, totalling about $1 billion. These reports were unsealed by a federal judge. Black, who paid Epstein $170 million for tax and estate planning advice, told investors after Epstein's death he was unaware of Epstein's misconduct; files listed more than $600,000 in "gifts" from Black to a former model connected to Epstein. In January 2021, Black stepped down from leadership roles at Apollo Global Management, the firm he co-founded. In March 2026, shareholders sued Apollo, Black, and co-founder Marc Rowan in a proposed class action.

=== David Blaine ===
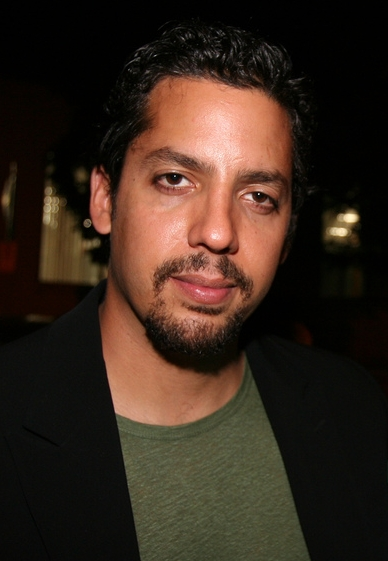
David Blaine

David Blaine is an American magician. Files showed a years-long correspondence with Epstein and regular dinners between 2012 and 2016. In 2015, Blaine agreed to write a letter of support for a U.S. visa application for an unidentified woman.

=== Leonard Blavatnik ===
Leonard Blavatnik is a British-American businessman. Blavatnik corresponded with Epstein and was invited to several of his gatherings. In a recorded conversation, Guzel Ganieva, a woman who accused Leon Black of rape, also accused Blavatnik of defamation and ruining her reputation.

=== Todd Boehly ===
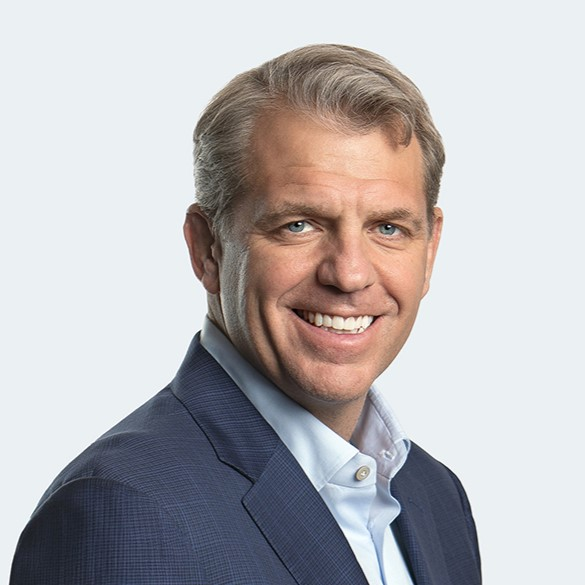
Todd Boehly

Todd Boehly is chairman of Chelsea, part-owner of the Los Angeles Dodgers and Los Angeles Lakers, and was managing partner at Guggenheim. Emails from 2011 showed Epstein arranged two meetings; the second was a conference call in part to discuss Mandelson. The files showed that Epstein asked Mandelson to help with Boehly's bid to buy Silverstone.

=== Leon Botstein ===
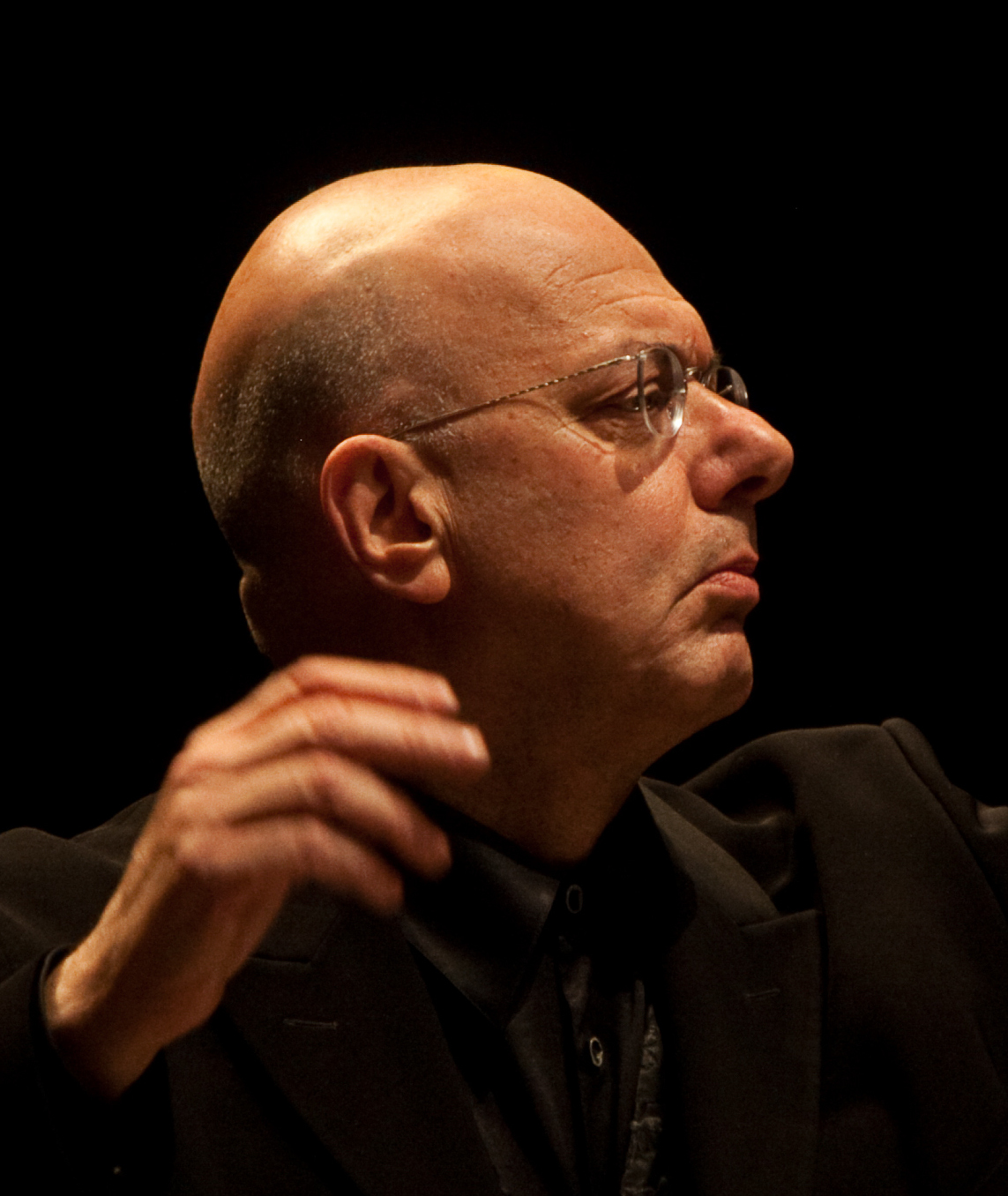
Leon Botstein

Leon Botstein was Bard College president. He met Epstein numerous times after his 2008 conviction, soliciting donations. In 2011, Epstein donated Bard $75,000. Botstein invited Epstein to school events in 2013 and 2016; Epstein planned to bring young female assistants each time; Botstein stated they had security ready due to Epstein's criminal record. In 2016, Botstein gave Bard $150,000 he received from Epstein, who said was for being on the board of Gratitude America, an Epstein-created foundation. Emails also revealed Epstein connected Botstein with the daughter of Allen and Previn. Botstein stepped down from his role at Bard.

=== Edward Boyden ===
Edward Boyden is an American-French MIT neuroscientist. In August 2015, Reid Hoffman hosted a dinner in Palo Alto for Boyden. Epstein emailed Peter Attia about the event, and sent himself a photo with Elon Musk, Peter Thiel, Mark Zuckerberg, and his wife, Priscilla Chan. In an email to Tom Pritzker, Epstein described the dinner as "wild".

=== Børge Brende ===
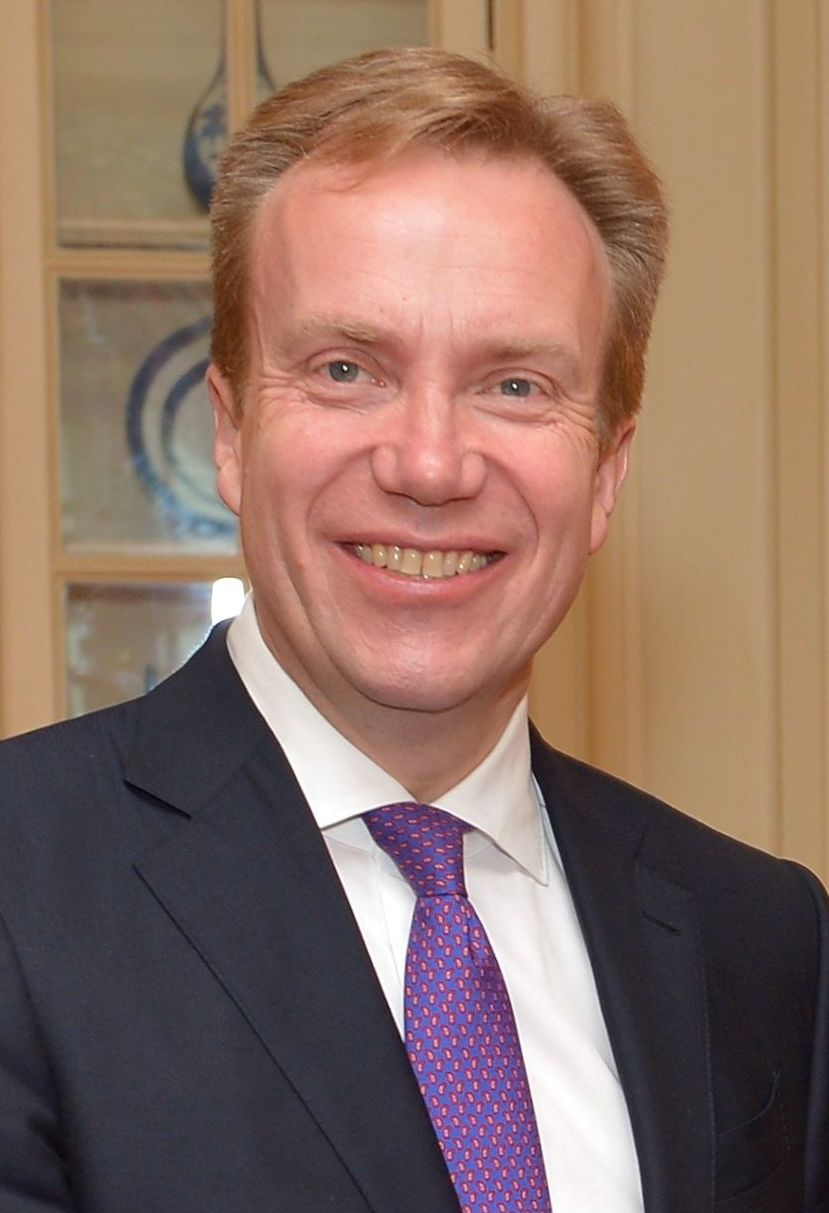
Børge Brende

Børge Brende is the CEO of the World Economic Forum who exchanged more than 120 emails and text messages with Epstein, and was a guest at several dinners at Epstein's townhouse in New York City. A photograph shows Brende at Epstein's New York home together with Steve Bannon and Terje Rød-Larsen, by whom Brende stated he was introduced to Epstein.

=== Flavio Briatore ===
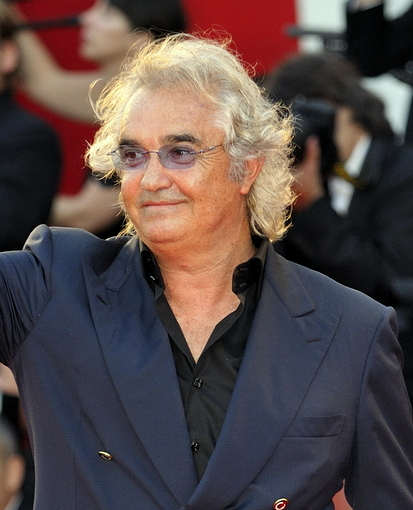
Flavio Briatore

Flavio Briatore is an Italian businessman. Briatore maintained email contact with Epstein.

=== Sergey Brin ===
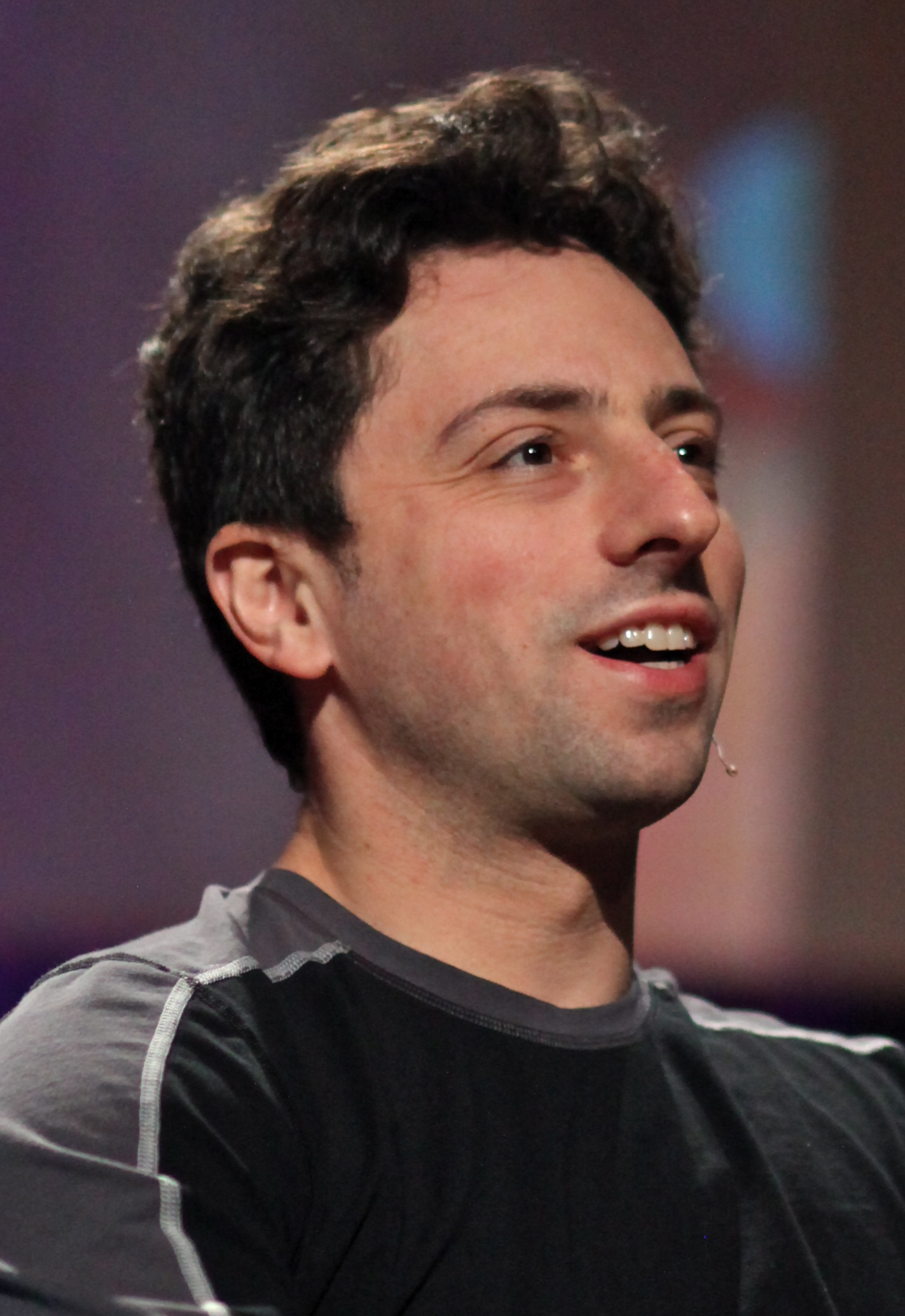
Sergey Brin

Sergey Brin is an American computer scientist and businessman who co-founded Google. Documents indicated Brin visited Epstein's private island and corresponded with Ghislaine Maxwell about attending dinners at Epstein's home.

=== John Brockman ===
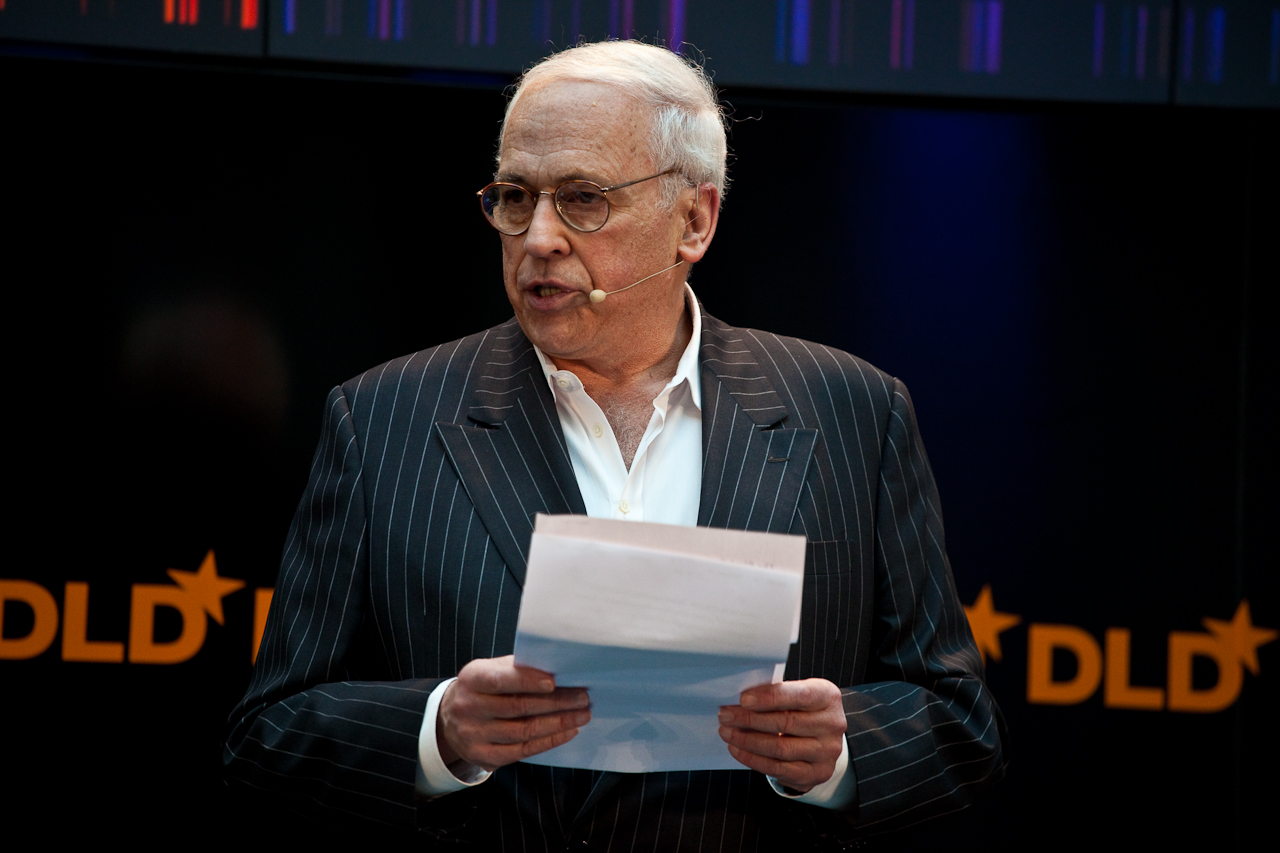
John Brockman

John Brockman established the Edge Foundation. Epstein was its biggest donor; Brockman organized with Silicon Valley billionaires events Epstein funded and attended. Brockman boasted that the net worth of his 2014 dinner combined the wealth of 60% of Americans. Epstein told Brockman not to care about diversity, holding women as "weak" and "a distraction".

=== Jean-Luc Brunel ===
Jean-Luc Brunel was a French model scout, and the founder of MC2 Model Management, with financing by Epstein. From 1998 to 2005, Brunel was listed as a passenger in flight logs for Epstein's private plane on 25 trips. In 2008, he visited the jail where Epstein was held at least 70 times. The files showed Brunel was listed in a 2019 FBI document as one of Epstein's "co-conspirators".

=== Albert Bryan Jr. ===
Albert Bryan Jr. is the Governor of the United States Virgin Islands. Epstein reached out to Bryan about an "unpermitted land clearing." Bryan denies any wrongdoing in his correspondence.

=== William Burns ===
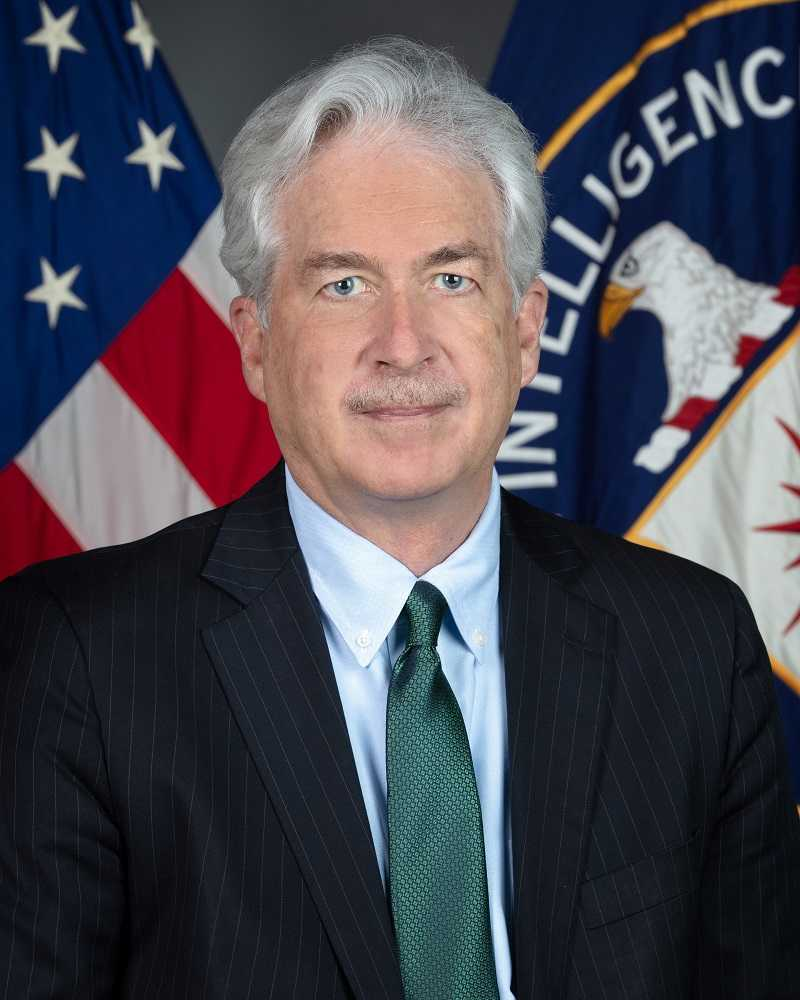
William Burns

William Burns is a former director of the Central Intelligence Agency whose scheduling documents showed three meetings with Epstein in 2014 as deputy secretary of state. They first met at Steptoe & Johnson, and subsequently at the Manhattan townhouse. The CIA denied Burns had any relationship with Epstein. Burns stated he regretted the meetings.

== C ==
=== Naomi Campbell ===
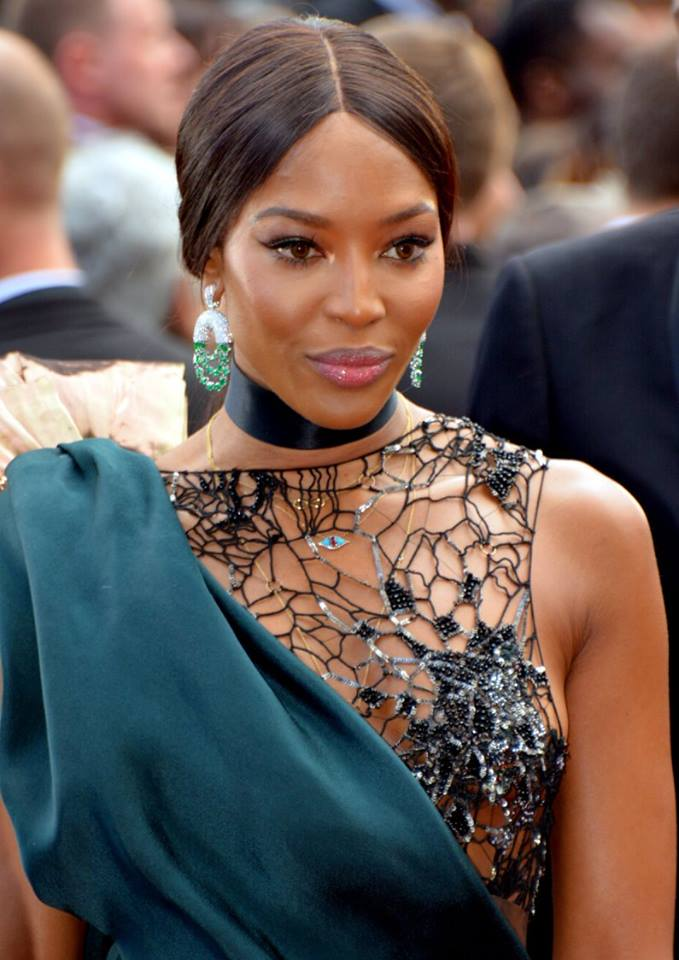
Naomi Campbell

Naomi Campbell is a British supermodel whose work included runway modeling for Victoria's Secret, where Wexner was CEO. Email exchanges showed Campbell inviting Epstein to events around the world and Epstein inviting Campbell to his island and to fly on his plane.

=== Nick Candy ===
Nick Candy is a luxury property developer who serves as treasurer for Reform UK. Candy interacted with Epstein associates Sarah Kellen, Ghislaine Maxwell and Jed Garfield.

=== Noam Chomsky ===
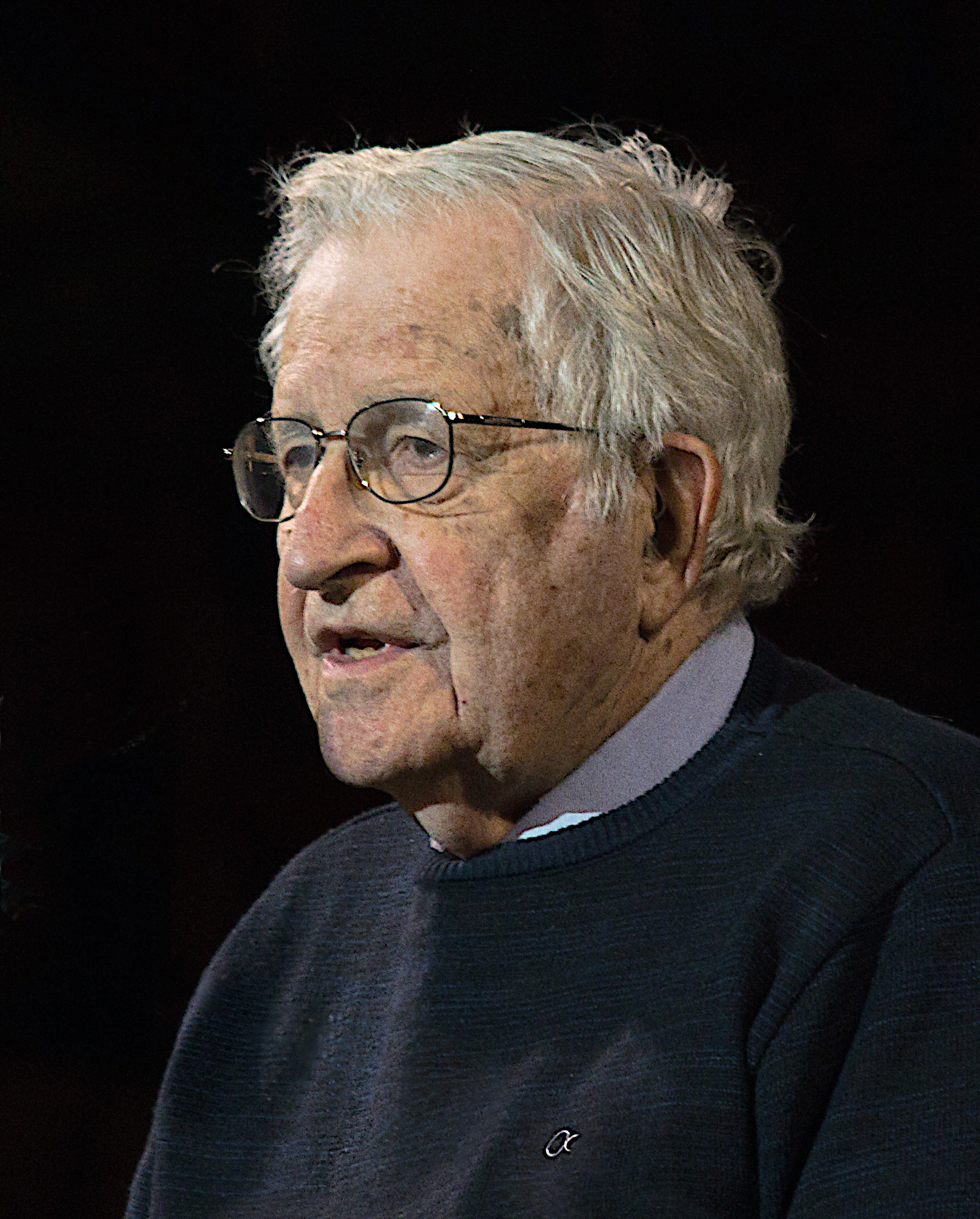
Noam Chomsky

Noam Chomsky is an intellectual and linguist. In a 2015 email, Epstein offered Chomsky use of his residences in New York and New Mexico. An undated photograph showed Chomsky seated next to Epstein on a plane. Chomsky wrote a letter praising Epstein and recounted how he had arranged for him to meet Barak.

Chomsky hired Epstein as a financial advisor, to recover some retirement funds and to advise him on resolving a dispute he had with his children over control of a marital trust. To this end, in March 2018, Epstein transferred approximately $270,000 to Chomsky. After Virginia Giuffre's accusations in 2019, Chomsky told Epstein that commenting would cause additional negative attention. In 2026, Chomsky's wife wrote a public apology on behalf of them both.

=== Deepak Chopra ===
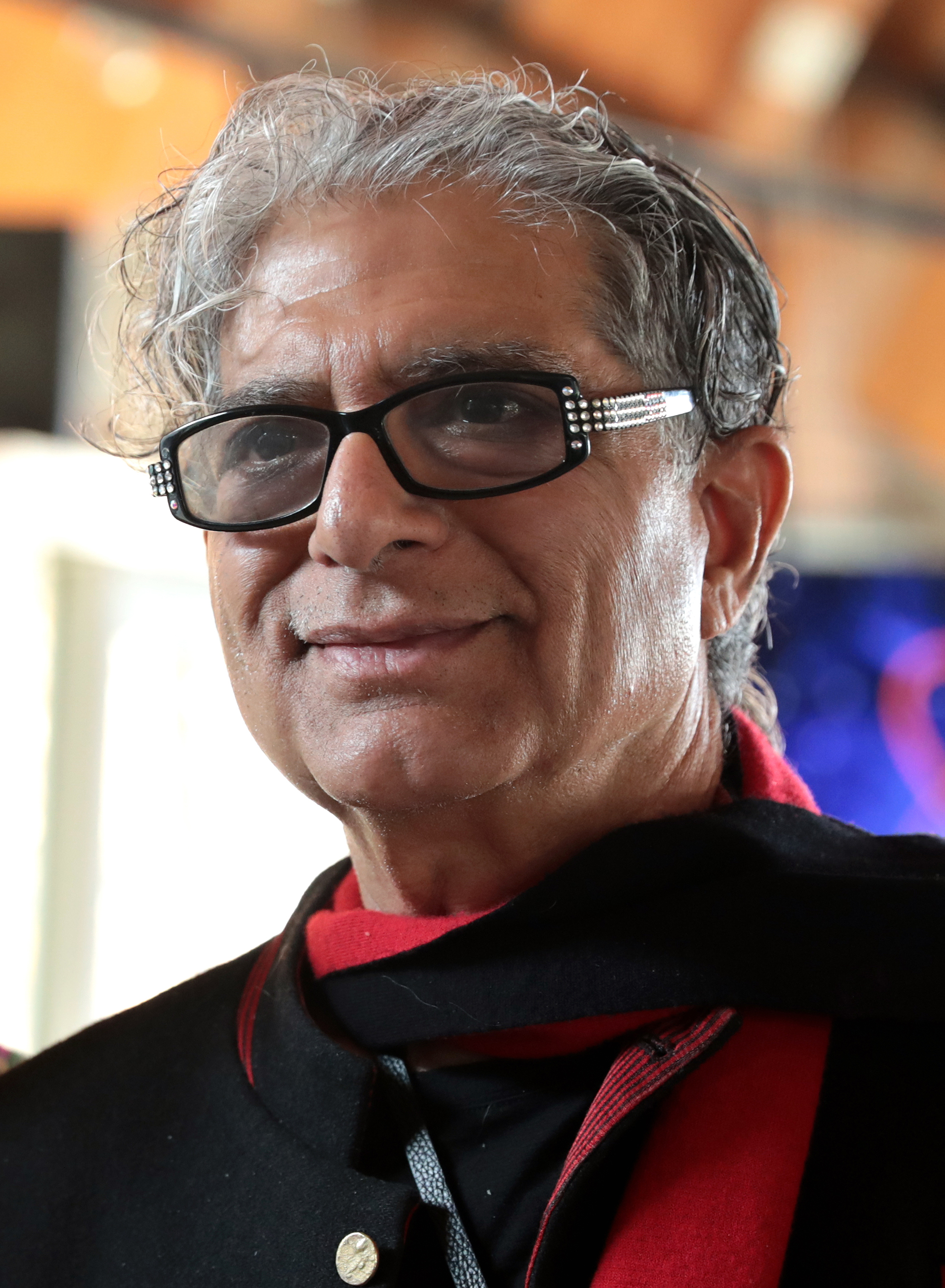
Deepak Chopra

Deepak Chopra is a New Age guru. Chopra met with Epstein at least a dozen times between 2016 and 2019. University of California, San Diego ended his affiliation with the school by the end of June 2026.

=== George Church ===
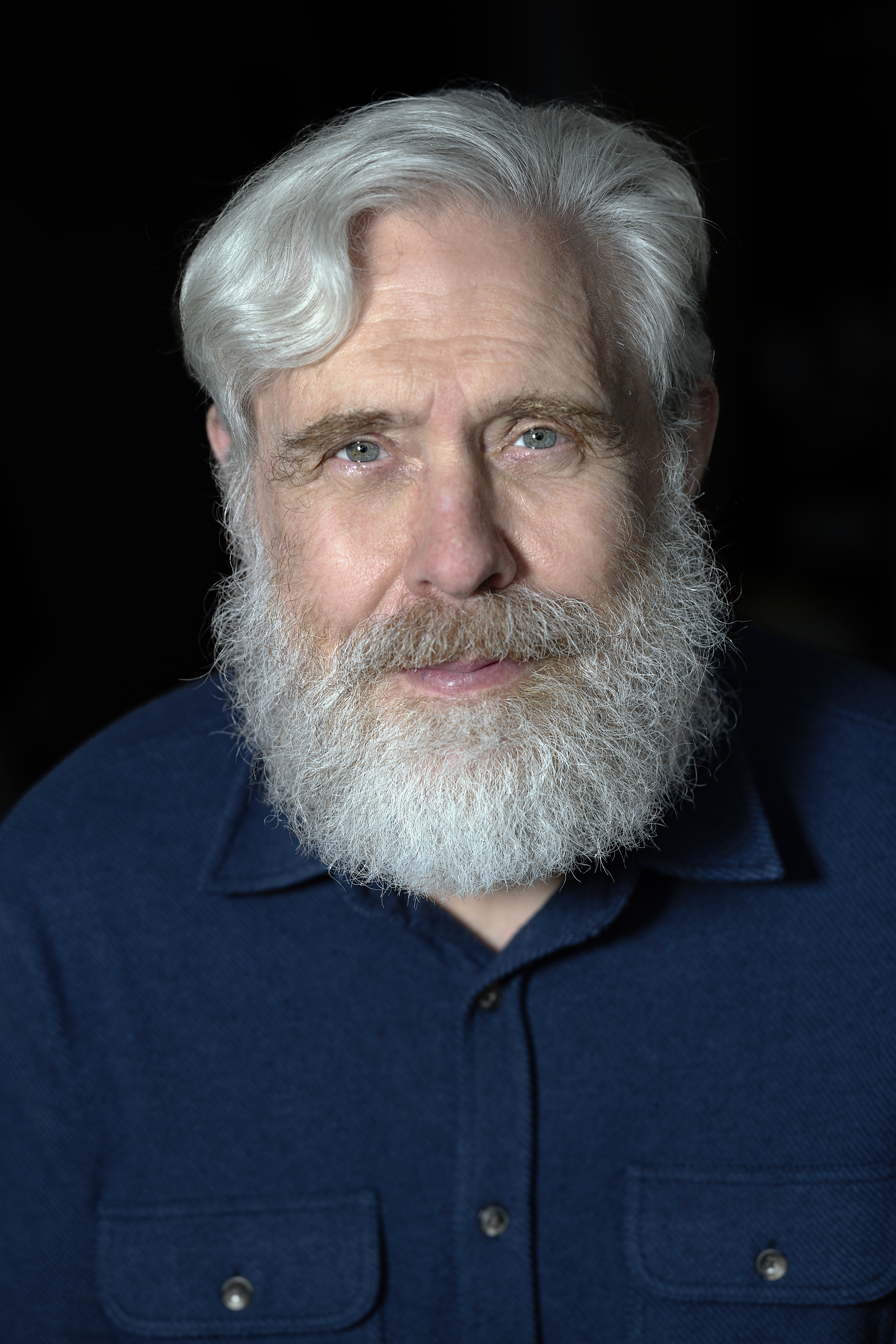
George Church

George Church is a Harvard University genetics professor. Files showed Church met with Epstein multiple times in 2014, and dined with him November along Ito, Hoffman, and Nowak. Church apologized in 2019, stating he was unaware of Epstein's crimes. Later reporting contradicted this.

=== Vitaly Churkin ===
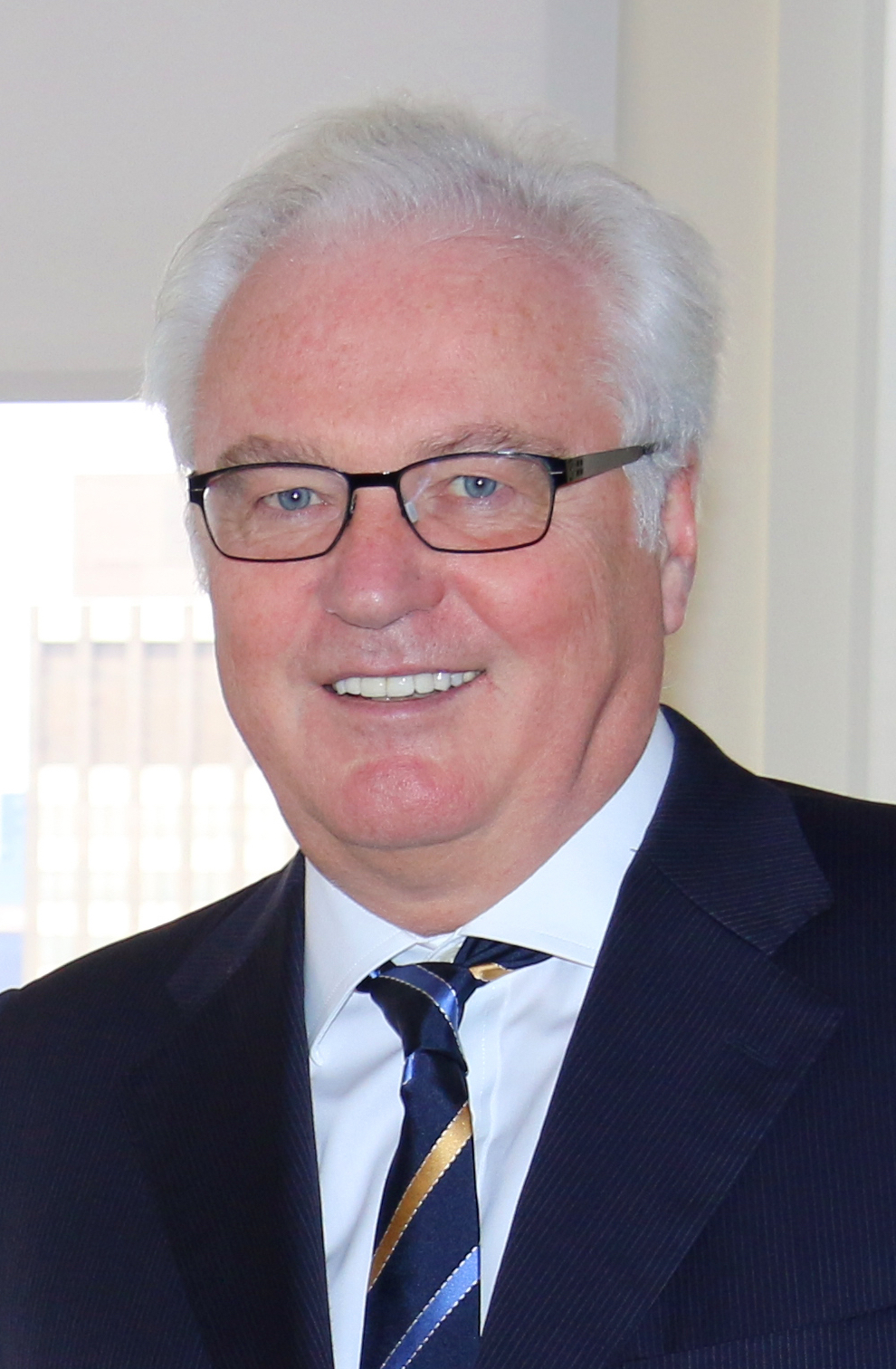
Vitaly Churkin

Vitaly Churkin was a diplomat who served as the Permanent Representative of Russia to the UN from 2006 until his death in 2017. According to CNN, files suggested he regularly met with Epstein, and that Epstein offered to help Churkin's son Maxim find work at a wealth management firm there.

=== Bill Clinton ===
Bill Clinton

Bill Clinton traveled on Epstein's plane at least 16 times; communications between Maxwell and Clinton staffers from 2001 to 2004 pertained to travel and dining logistics; some emails between Maxwell and Clinton's office were flirtatious or lewd. Clinton stated he cut ties with Epstein before his 2006 charges, did not know about his crimes, and denied ever visiting Epstein's island. An unredacted message shows Doug Band saying he shared a Blackberry account with Clinton.

=== David Copperfield ===
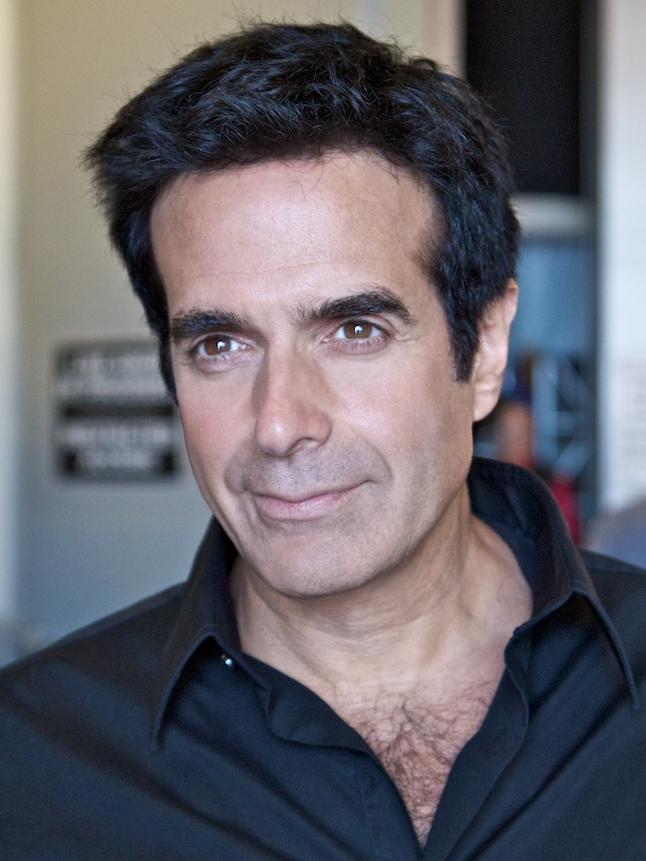
David Copperfield

David Copperfield is an American illusionist. Johanna Sjoberg testified to attending a 2004 dinner at Epstein's home where Copperfield performed magic tricks. Phone message pads from 2005 showed Copperfield left messages for Epstein. An October 2007 email described Copperfield as "Epstein's favorite cohort" and said tickets with "backstage passes" were a frequent gift Epstein gave to girls. Copperfield denied Epstein's friendship. Undated photographs released in December 2025 showed Copperfield and Maxwell posing together in bathrobes.

== D ==
=== Francisco D'Agostino ===
Francisco D'Agostino is a businessman. From 2012–2018, he visited Epstein on his island and in New York, shared political intelligence, proposed business deals, introduced him to powerful Venezuelan figures, and inquired about some "water gazelle" he met on the island. On D'Agostino's advice, Epstein purchased at least $4.5 million in PDVSA bonds. By 2019, the US Treasury scrutinized D'Agostino for trying to evade US sanctions on PVDSA and Venezuelan oil.

=== Lawrence Delson ===
Lawrence Delson was a professor at the Fashion Institute of Technology. He and Epstein communicated for several years, writing to each other about how they cherished their friendship. Files also revealed financial transfers, but their context remains unclear. The school suspended Delson and launched an investigation.

=== Alan Dershowitz ===
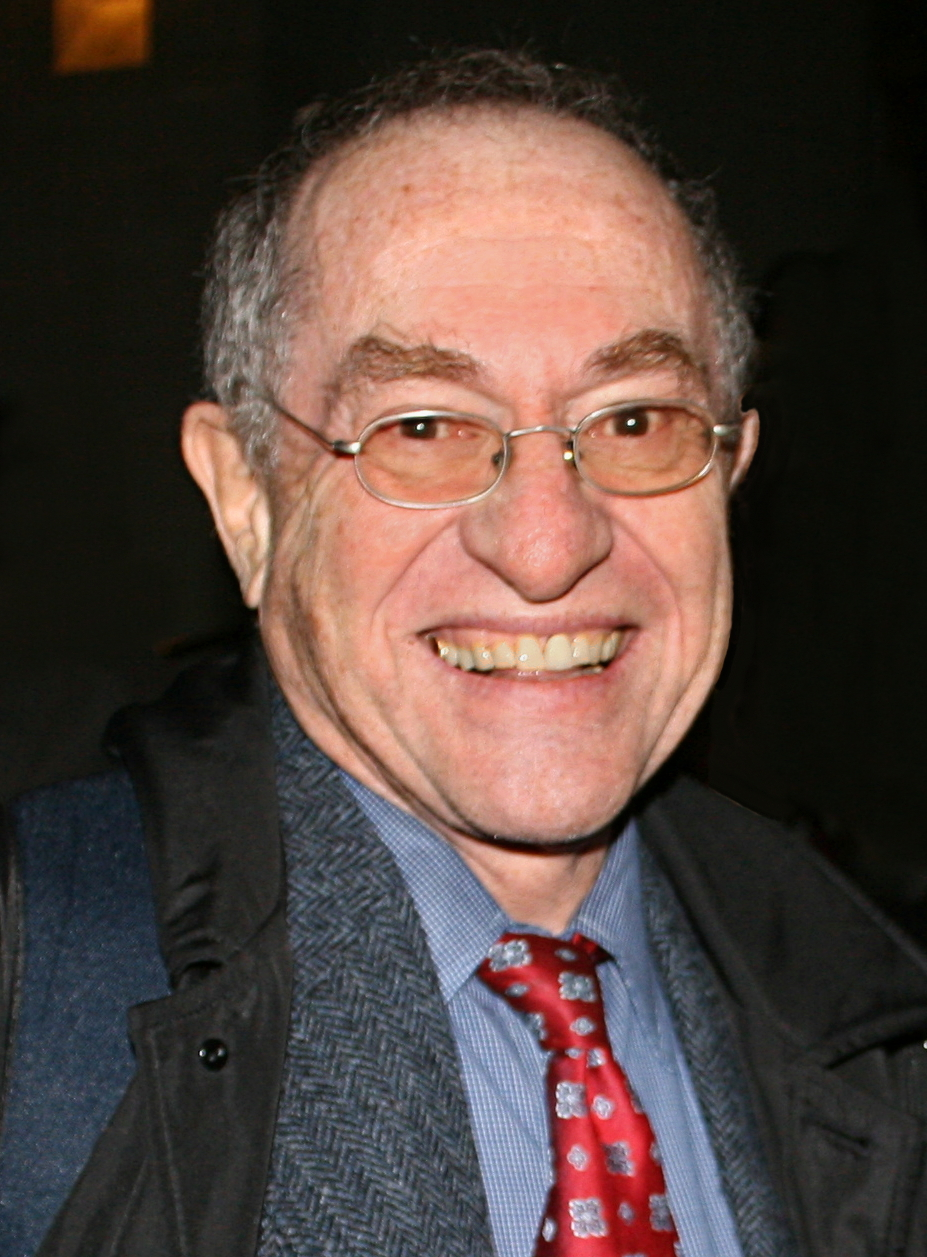
Alan Dershowitz

Alan Dershowitz was part of the team that negotiated a non-prosecution agreement for Epstein in 2007. Weeks after Epstein's death, JPMorgan Chase filed a suspicious activity report for transactions conducted by Dershowitz as well as Glenn Dubin, Leon Black, and Leslie Wexner, totalling about $1 billion.

=== Maria Drokova ===
Maria Drokova is a Russian investor and venture capitalist. Epstein paid Drokova for public relations work. In 2017 and 2018, Drokova set up meetings with Epstein and journalists to help rehabilitate Epstein's reputation. Drokova selected "suitable" journalists for publications about Epstein and coordinated preparation of his comments, including in contributor articles for publications including The Huffington Post, The Next Web, and Thrive Global. In a 2017 email, Drokova asked Epstein to introduce her to "adequate Russian oligarchs" to invest in her venture capital fund. Drokova and Epstein had a "personal, at times flirtatious relationship", with Epstein purchasing handbags and booking haircuts for Drokova.

=== Glenn Dubin ===
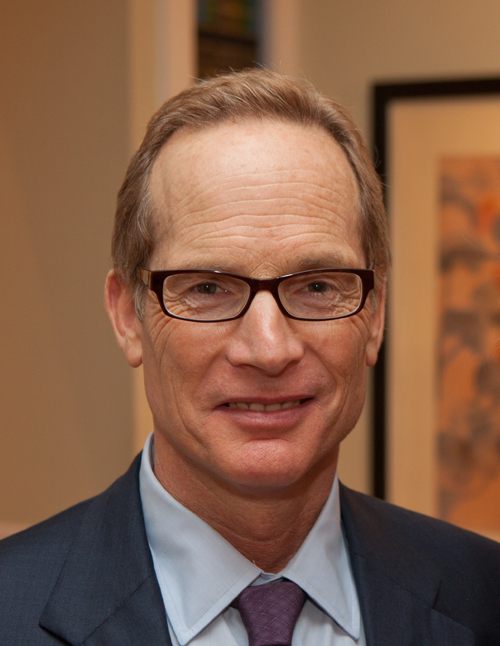
Glenn Dubin

Glenn Dubin is an American billionaire hedge fund manager and husband of Epstein's former girlfriend Eva Andersson-Dubin. Weeks after Epstein's death, JPMorgan Chase filed a suspicious activity report for transactions conducted by Dubin as well as Leon Black, Alan Dershowitz, and Leslie Wexner, totalling about $1 billion. Guiffre listed Dubin as one of the men with whom Maxwell and Epstein directed her to have sex. The Dubins' former household manager, Rinaldo Rizzo, recounted in released court documents an encounter with a 15-year-old girl who was allegedly trafficked by Epstein in 2005. Dubin denies the allegations made in these sworn testimonies.

== E ==
=== Edward Jay Epstein ===
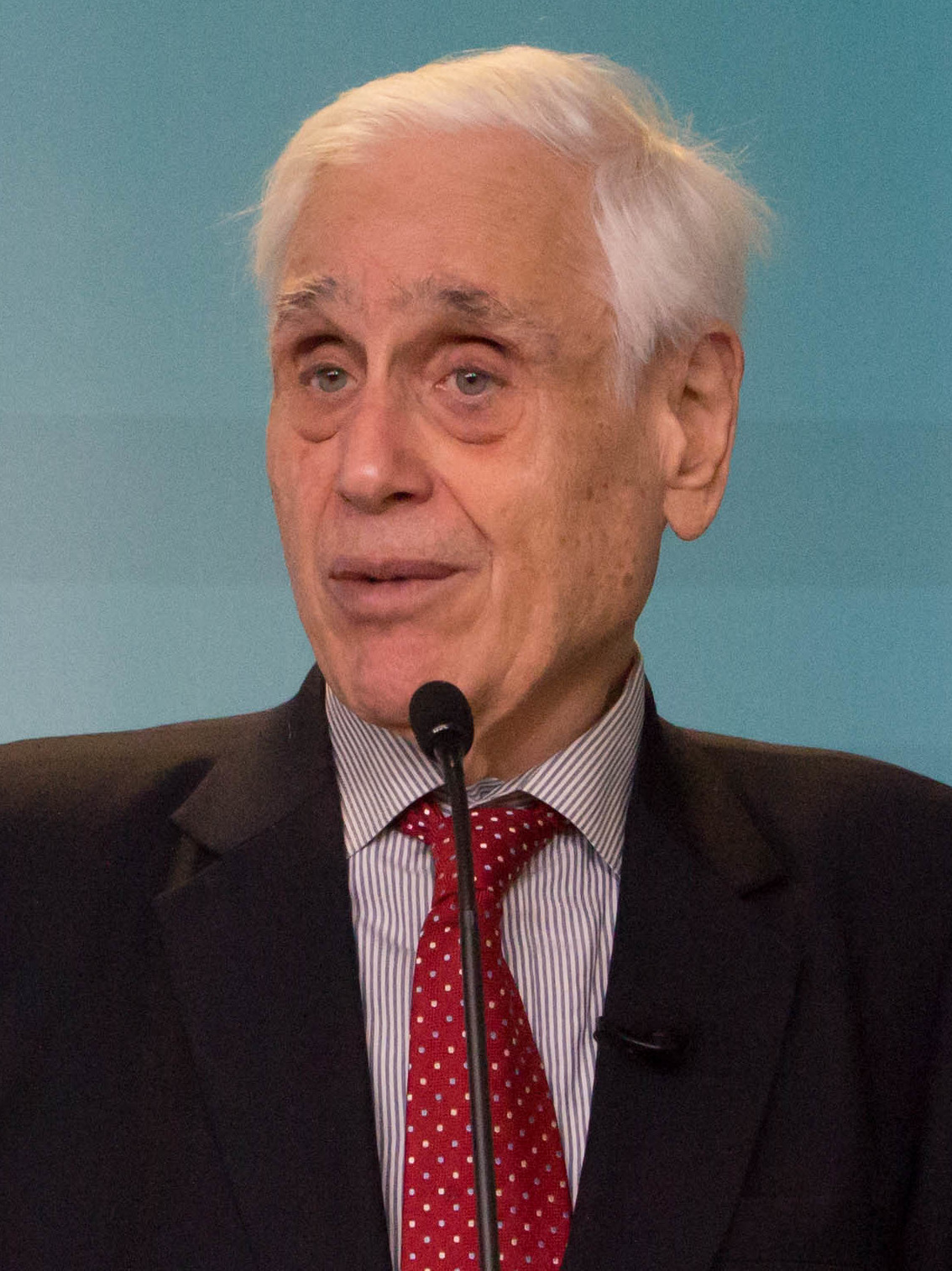
Edward Jay Epstein

Edward Jay Epstein (no relation to Jeffrey Epstein) was an investigative journalist. His first contact with Jeffrey Epstein was from 1987–1989, when he wrote about what he believed were fraud and other instances of legal market manipulation. He identified Jeffrey as a grifter and fabulist without naming him, and Jeffrey broke contact afterward. Twenty-four years later, Jeffrey Epstein contacted Ed Epstein again, inviting him to tea to discuss an article Ed wrote about Nabokov, and an AI project named Sophia. David Hanson and Ben Goertzel both worked on the Sophia robot and solicited significant funding from Jeffrey Epstein.

== F ==
=== Andrew Farkas ===
Andrew Farkas co-owned a marina with Epstein in St. Thomas. Documents showed the two men exchanged crude emails about women in 2010. As chair of the Hasty Pudding Club, Farkas solicited at least $375,000 from Epstein between 2013 and 2019 for the institute, which helped Epstein maintain connections with Harvard University. In a 2018 note, Farkas told Epstein he considered him one of his best friends. Farkas also stayed on Epstein's island. Farkas stated the relationship was purely business-related and regretted the association.

=== Sarah Ferguson ===
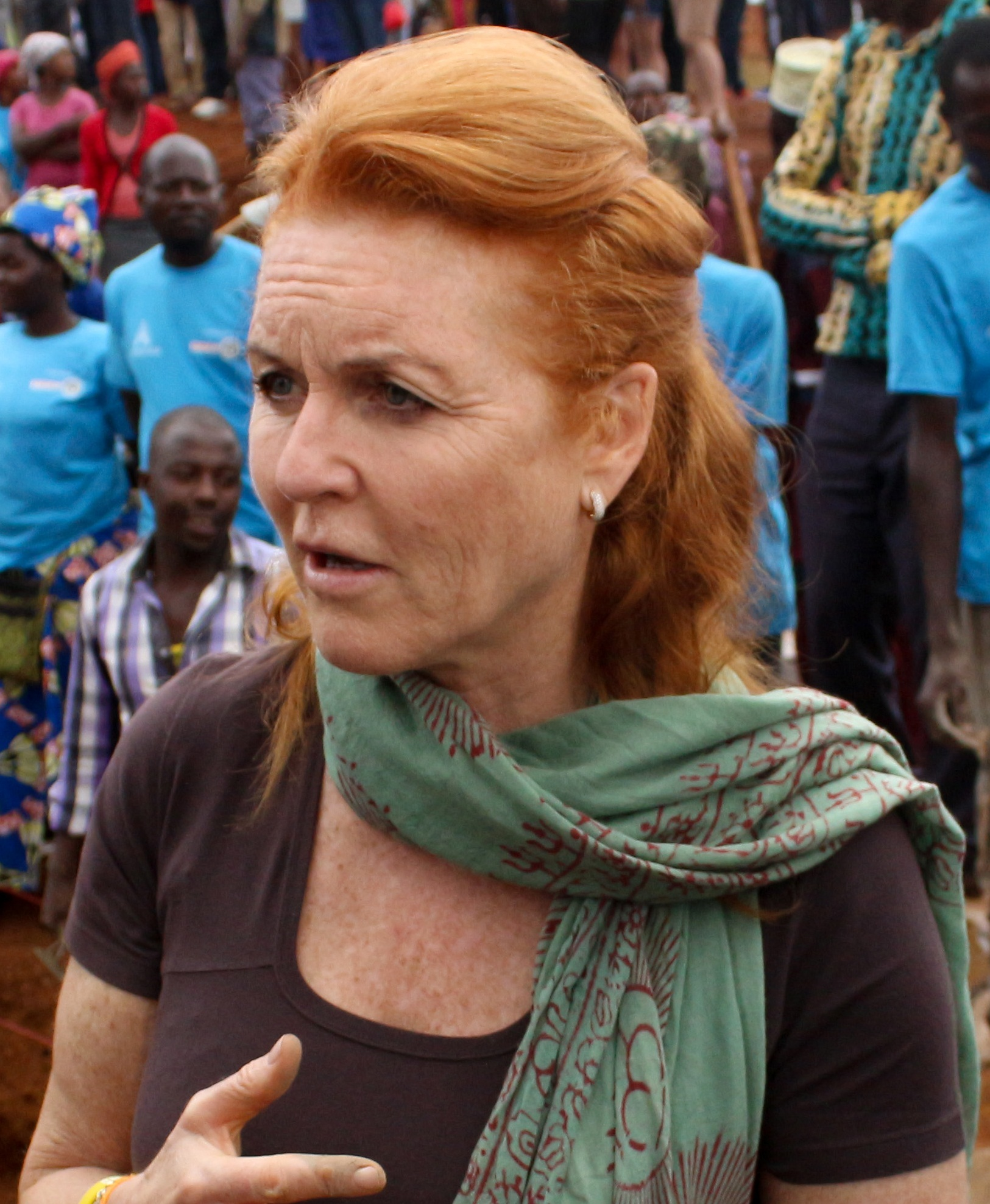
Sarah Ferguson

Sarah Ferguson, formerly Duchess of York, is the ex-wife of Mountbatten-Windsor. In a 2009 email, she called Epstein a "brother" and seemed to suggest she and her daughters met him. Other emails mentioned a "Sarah Ferguson brand". In 2011, Ferguson stated publicly that her relationship with Epstein had been a "gigantic error of judgment", but later apologized to him by email. After the 2026 release, the charity she established in 2020 closed.

== G ==
=== Bill Gates ===
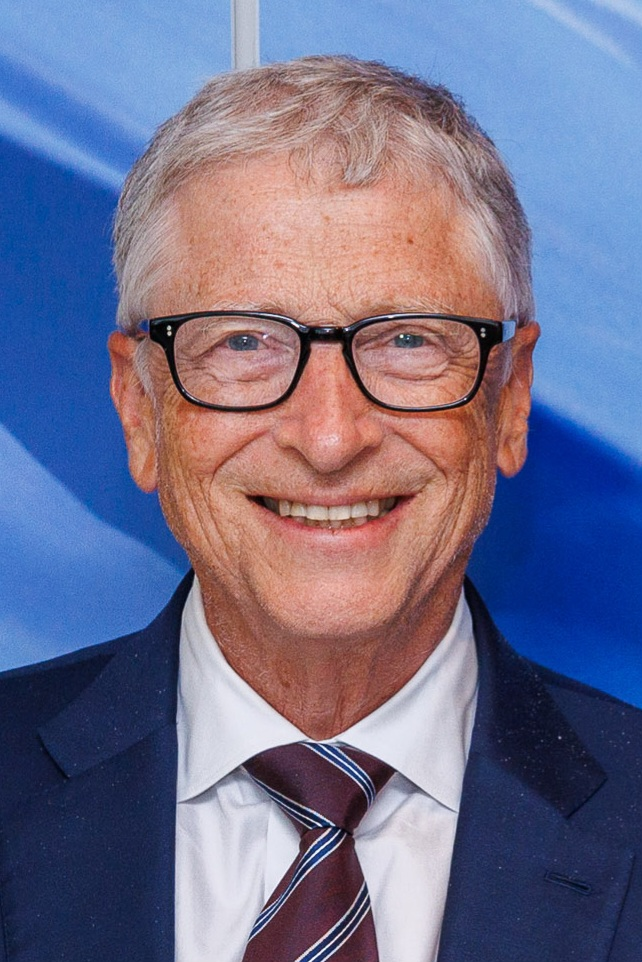
Bill Gates

Bill Gates co-founded Microsoft. Gates and Epstein met in 1992; according to The New York Times, they also had many meetings starting in 2011. In a January 2025 interview, Gates admitted it was a mistake to associate with Epstein. Gates appeared in the estate photos released in December 2025; the files also revealed a draft email in which Epstein made allegations that Gates rejects. On February 25, 2026, Gates admitted to two affairs, confirming one revealed by The Wall Street Journal in 2023 when it obtained an email in which Epstein appeared to blackmail Gates over that affair. He also reiterated that it was "foolish" to associate with Epstein and clarified that one of the photos released were taken with two of Epstein's assistants.

=== David Gelernter ===
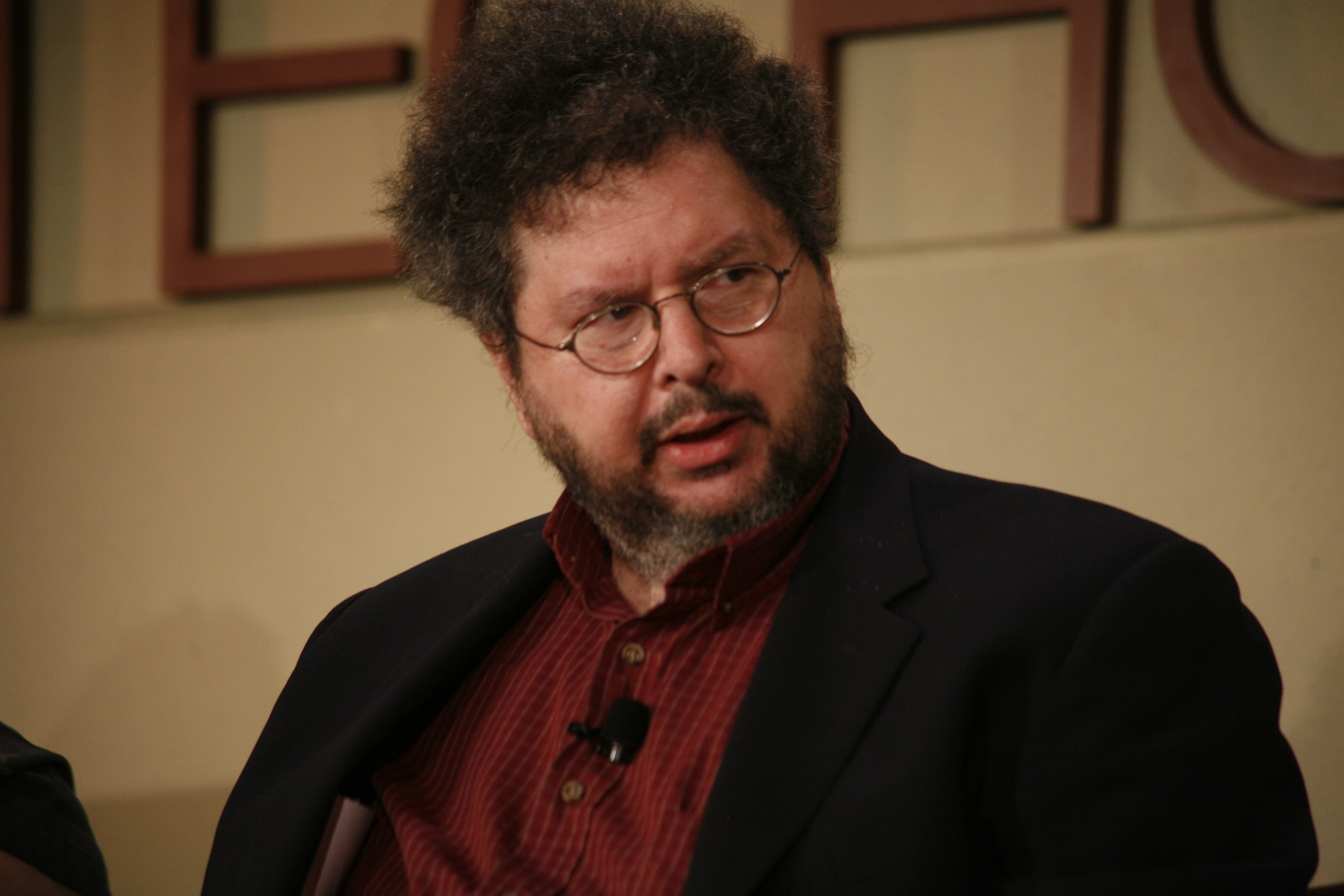
David Gelernter

David Gelernter is a Yale professor who corresponded with Epstein from 2009 to 2015. Amid a review by Yale in February 2026, Gelernter has been relieved of teaching duties.

=== Gordon Getty ===
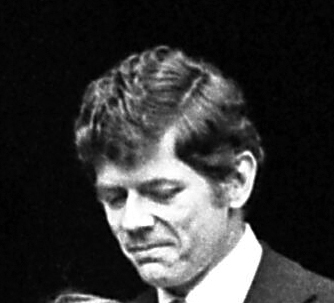
Gordon Getty

Gordon Getty is the billionaire heir of the Getty Oil fortune. He often funded Robert Trivers' research, and Trivers introduced Getty to Epstein. When learning of Epstein's criminal conviction, Getty commiserated and pointed to his own scandal (a secret second family). Getty and Epstein corresponded and spent time together from 2013–2018.

=== Ben Goertzel ===
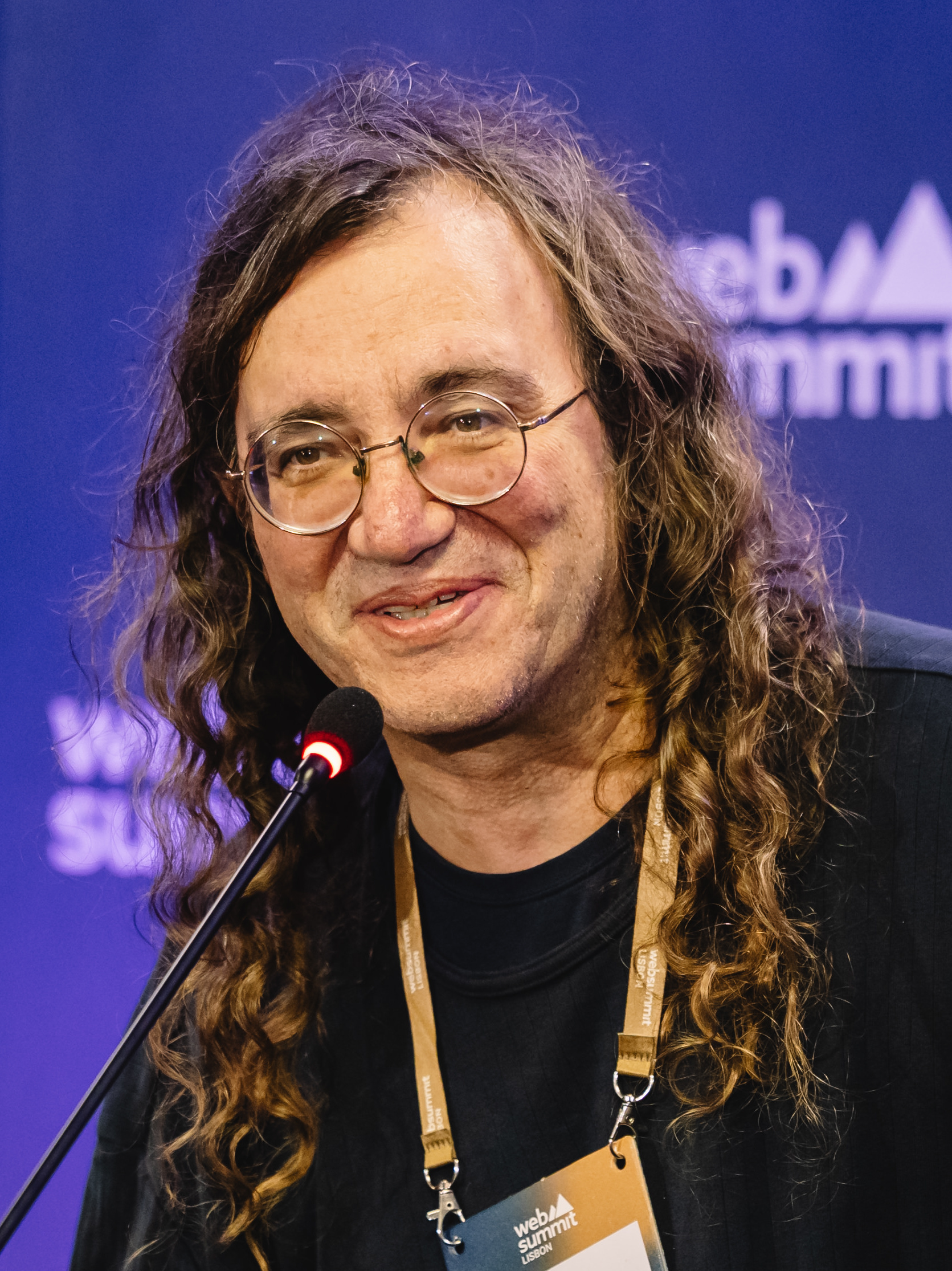
Ben Goertzel

Ben Goertzel was the chief scientist at Hanson Robotics, to whom Epstein gave a $100,000 grant and additional funds over the next decade. Between 2010 and 2015, Epstein's non-profits channeled at least $113,000 to Goertzel's company. This maneuver made Goertzel eligible to secure over $1 million in grants from the Hong Kong government. The two corresponded between 2011 and at least through 2018.

== H ==
=== Josh Harris ===
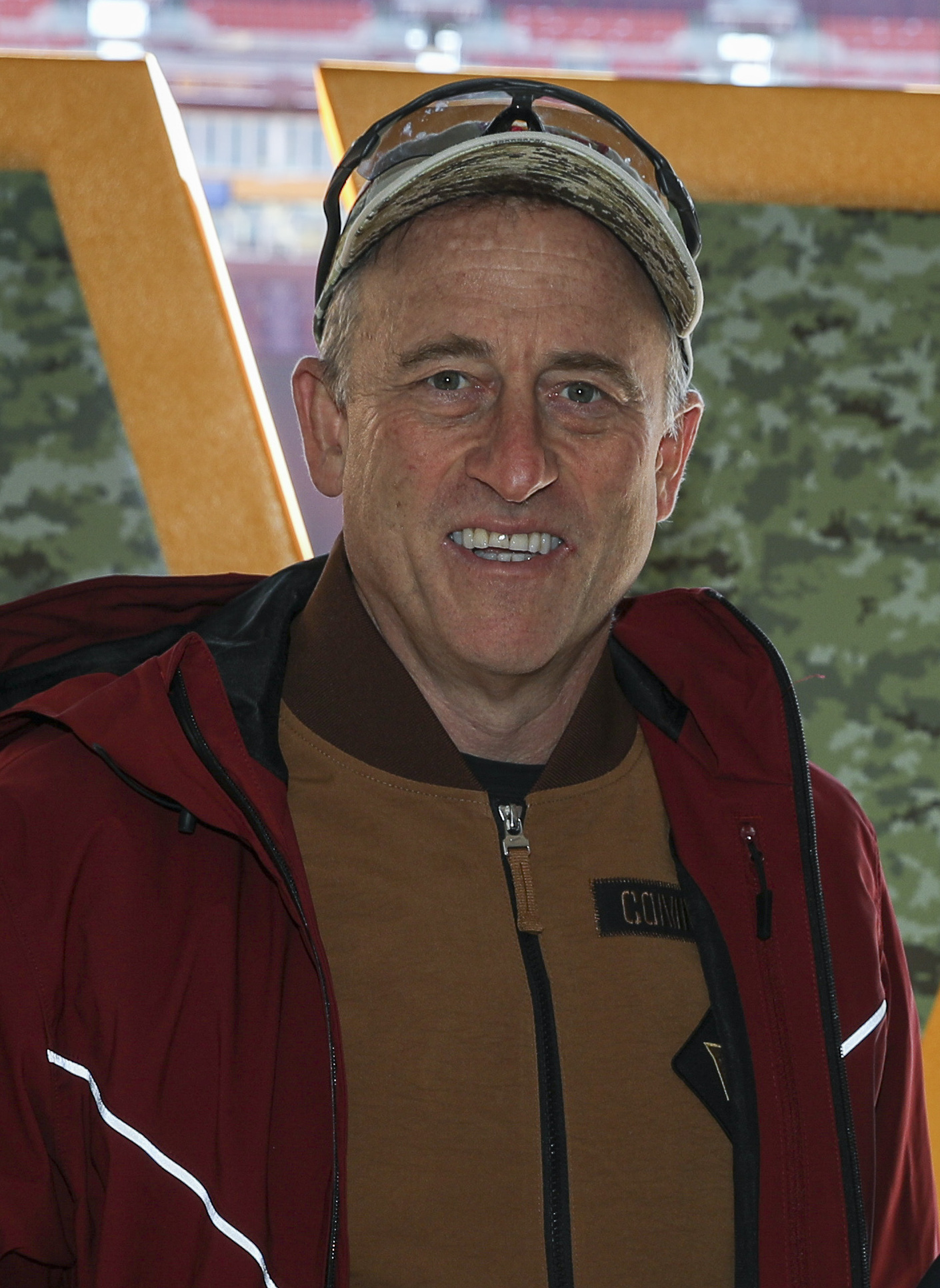
Josh Harris

Josh Harris co-founded Apollo Global Management and Harris Blitzer Sports & Entertainment. The American billionaire corresponded with Epstein from 2013–2016. Emails show that Harris met Epstein, Gates, and Ron Baron at Epstein's New York home in 2014. Harris denied having had a relationship with Epstein.

=== Stephen Hawking ===
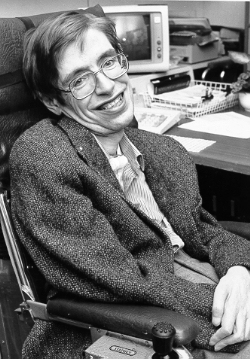
Stephen Hawking

Stephen Hawking was a theoretical physicist who was mentioned in court documents released in 2024 during Maxwell's trial. Hawking has been reported as a guest on Epstein's island.

=== Reid Hoffman ===
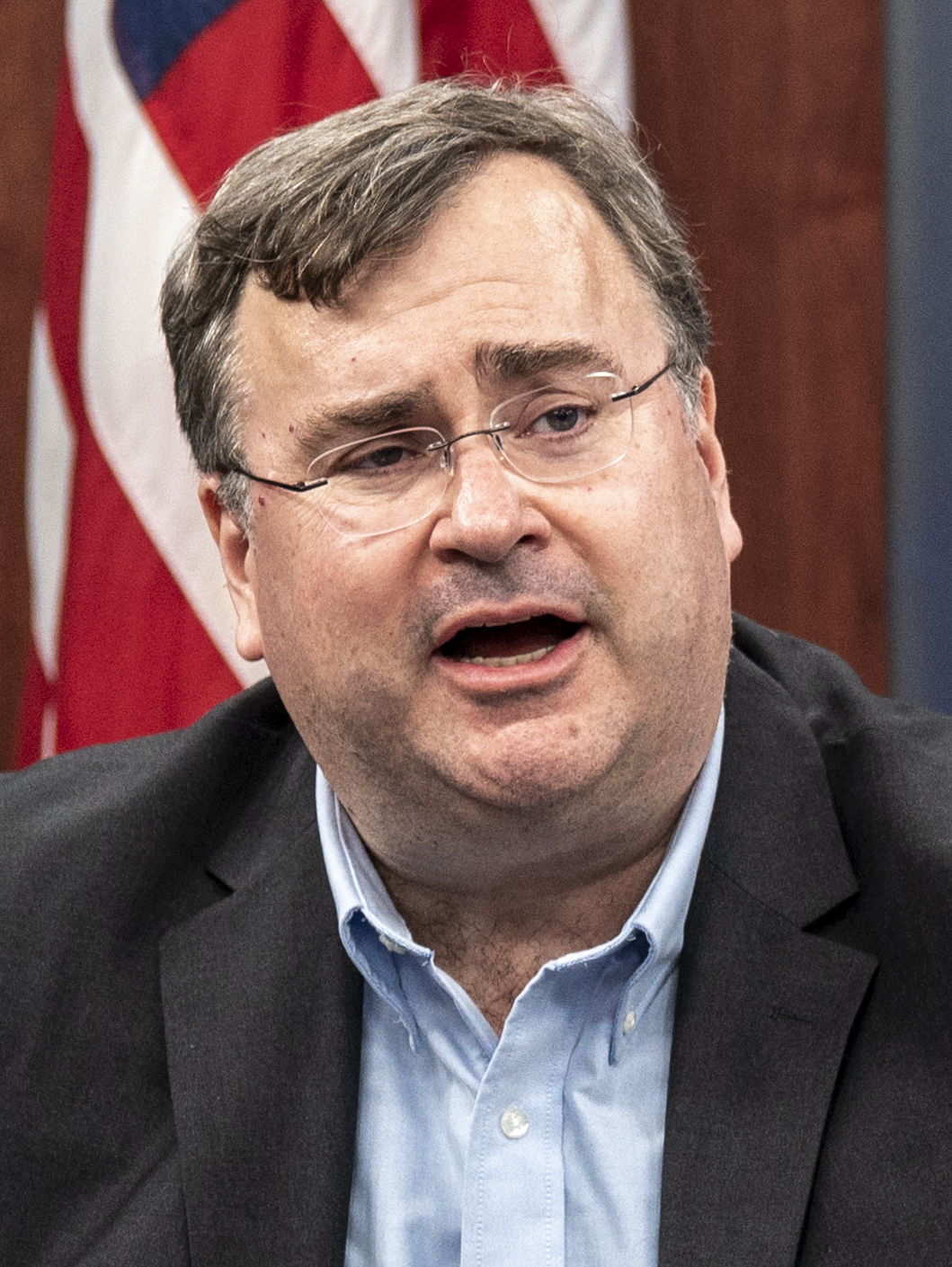
Reid Hoffman

LinkedIn co-founder Reid Hoffman attended the dinner with Musk, Thiel and Zuckerberg. Documents showed he visited Epstein's island in November 2014, and had multiple Skype calls with him in 2013 and 2014 as per Epstein's calendar.

=== Jack Horner ===
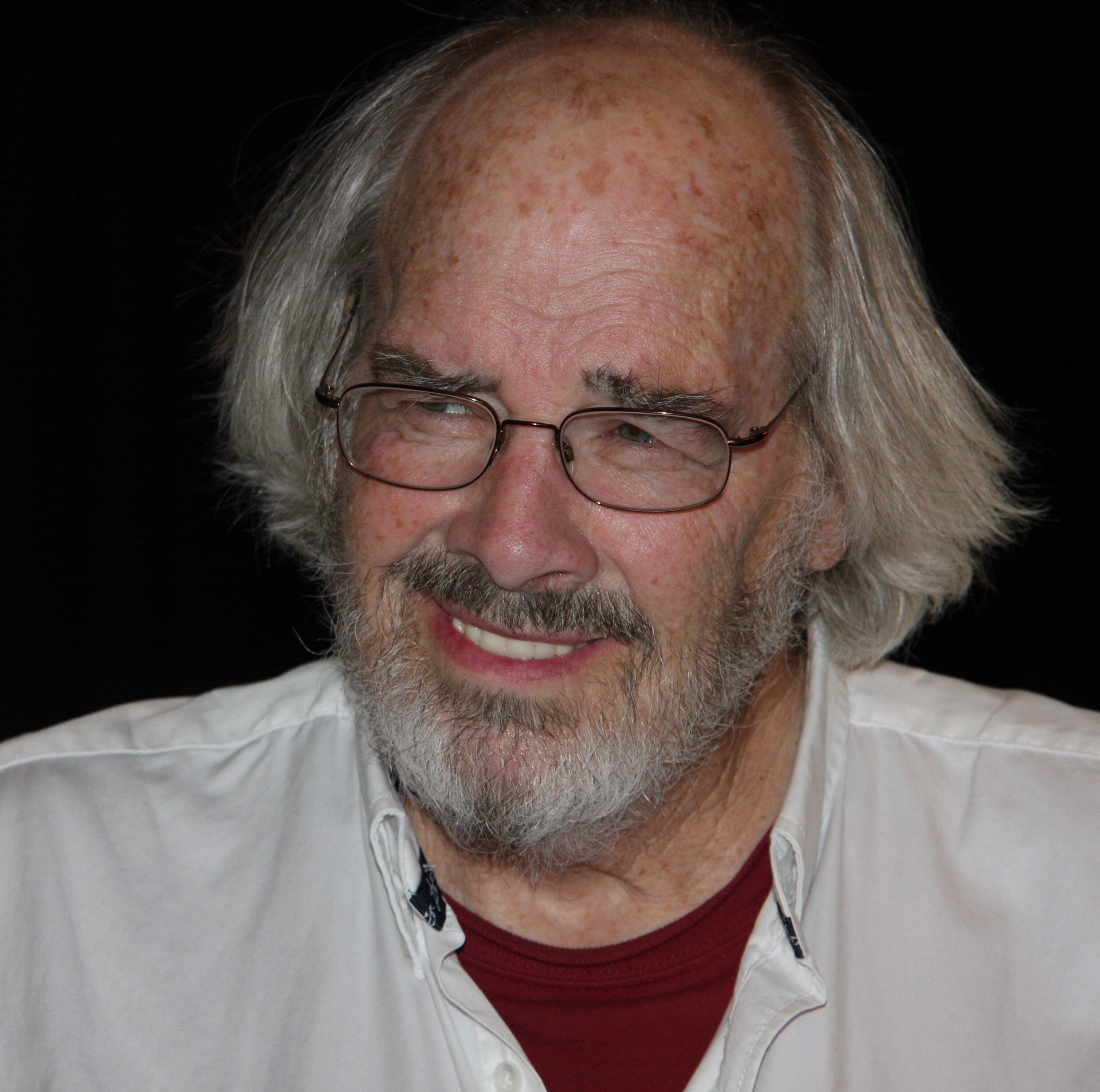
Jack Horner

Jack Horner is a paleontologist who visited a New Mexico property owned by Epstein in 2012 and exchanged several emails with him thereafter. These messages contain expressions of thanks for hospitality and suggest possible financial or logistical support for some of Horner's scientific projects. In particular, Epstein had expressed interest in funding Horner's "Dinochicken Project", to bioengineer a dinosaur from chicken DNA. Horner's employment with Chapman University ended in February 2026.

== I ==
=== Joi Ito ===
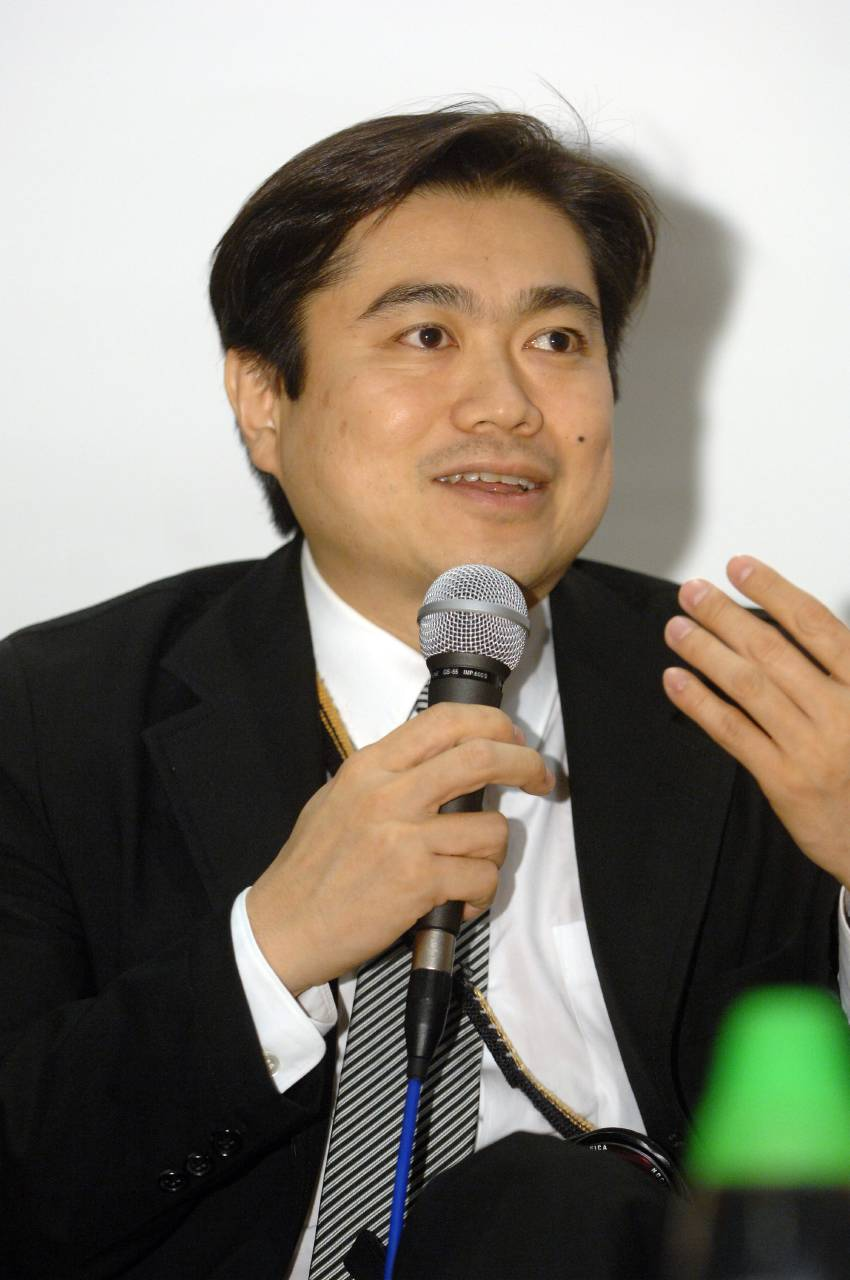
Joi Ito

Joi Ito is a former director of the MIT Media Lab who received $1.7 million from Epstein, including $1.2 million for his own investment funds. Internal emails showed Ito and other Media Lab officials took measures to conceal the lab's relationship with Epstein; in one 2014 email, Ito asked development staff to record a $100,000 donation from Epstein as "anonymous". He twice traveled to Epstein's island seeking donations. An October 2014 email showed Ito writing that a $2 million gift from Bill Gates had been "directed by Jeffrey Epstein"; Gates denied it. Ito resigned from MIT, from the boards of the MacArthur Foundation, the Knight Foundation, The New York Times Company, and a visiting professorship at Harvard.

== J ==
=== Thorbjørn Jagland ===
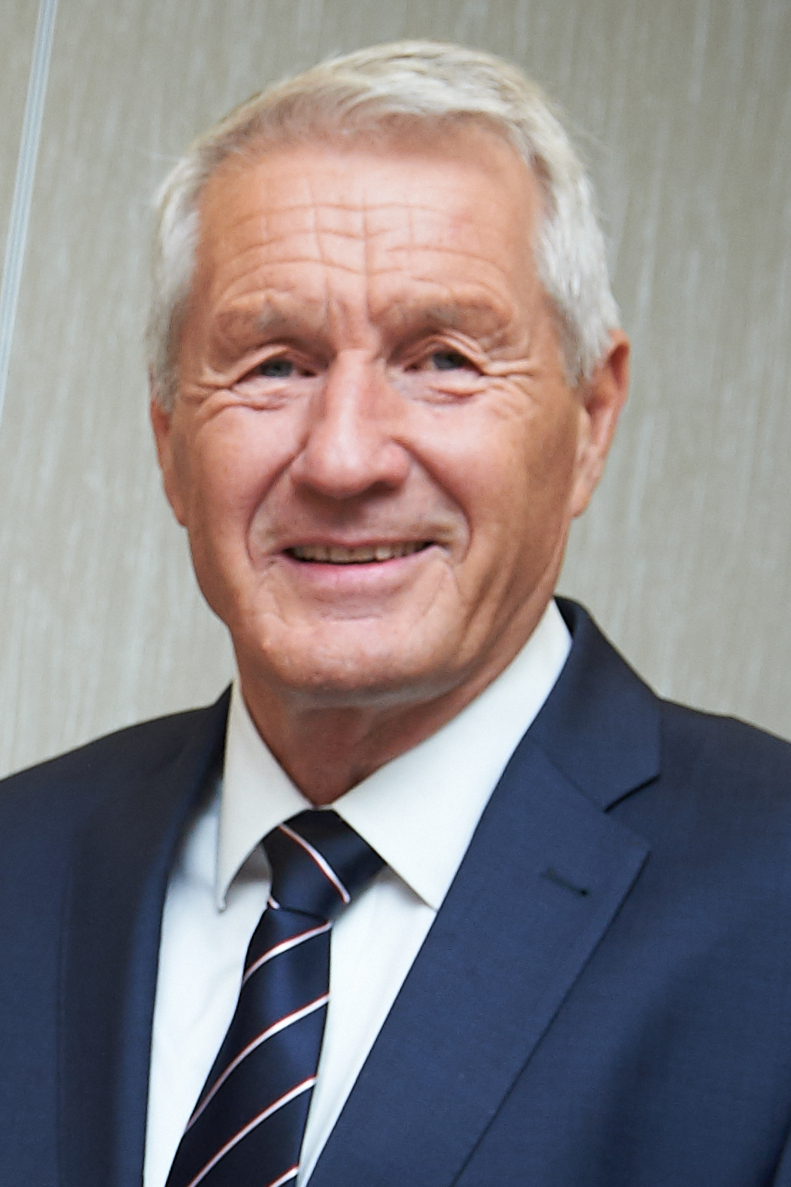
Thorbjørn Jagland

Thorbjørn Jagland is a Norwegian politician who served as prime minister from 1996 to 1997. In a 2014 email to Epstein, Jagland had planned a family trip to Little Saint James island, while he was secretary general of the Council of Europe. The trip was eventually cancelled. Jagland was also the head of the Nobel Committee when he exchanged emails with Epstein. Norwegian Prime Minister Jonas Gahr Støre said Jagland had exercised "poor judgement". Epstein told Jagland that he could advise Putin on how to talk with Trump. After the Council of Europe lifted his diplomatic immunity, in February 2026 Jagland was charged with "gross corruption" over his links to Epstein by Norway's Økokrim prosecution service.

=== John de Jongh Jr. ===
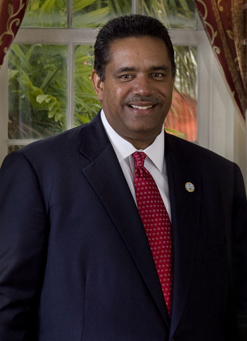
John de Jongh Jr.

John de Jongh Jr. is an American businessman and former governor of the United States Virgin Islands (2007–2015). Emails in the files show that from 2008 to 2009 Epstein paid the tuition for John de Jongh's children. The tuition invoices covered multiple universities and excluded room and board. After his wife, Cecile de Jongh, thanked Epstein in June 2009, Epstein described the payments as "a treat" and said "Its [sic] as if i [sic] had my own kids in college." Epstein also paid college tuition for a student identified as "Thomas", who was identified as the son of Jeanne Brennan Wiebracht, John de Jongh's former campaign accountant.

=== Grady Judd ===
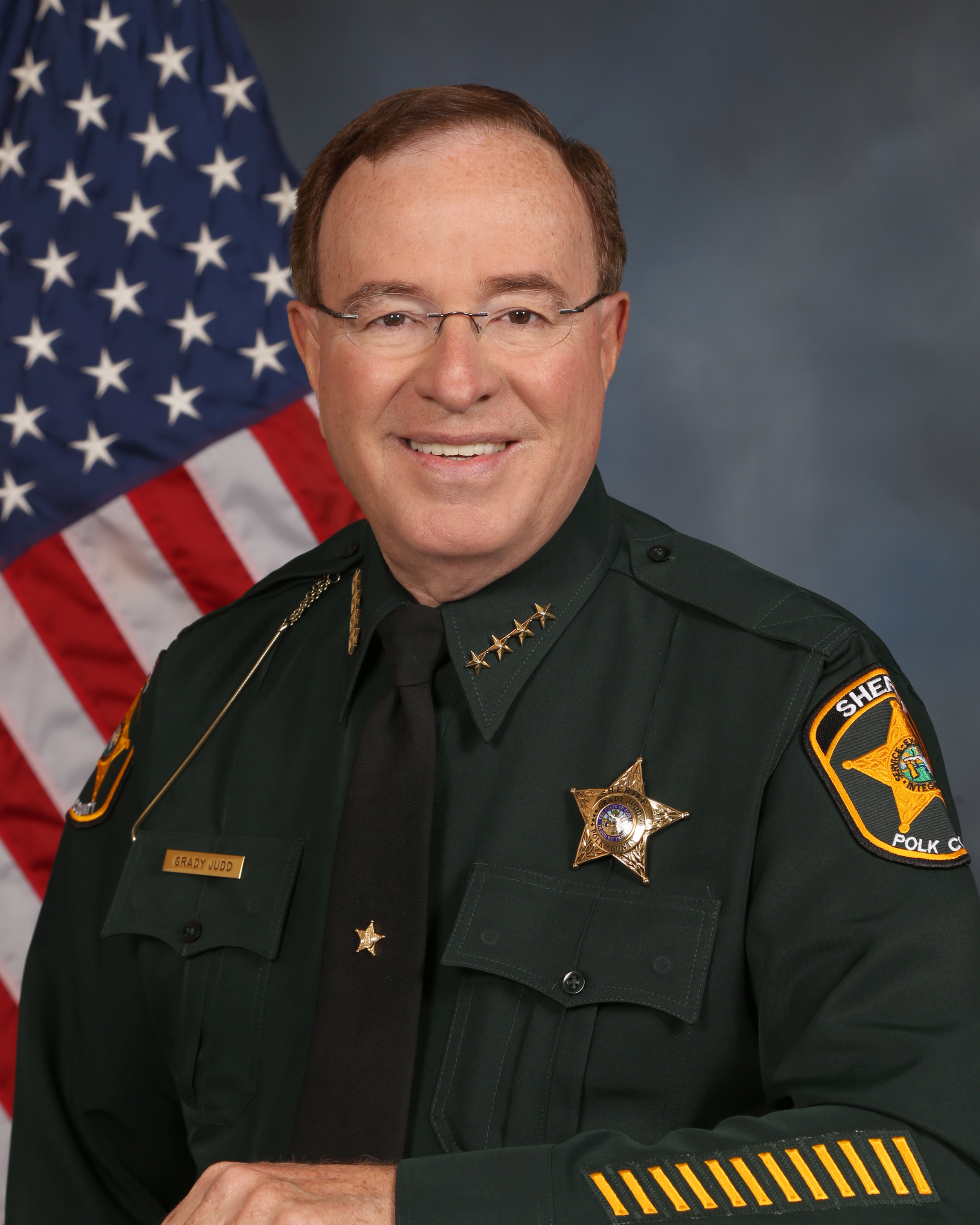
Sheriff Grady Judd

Grady Judd is an American law enforcement officer serving as the sheriff of Polk County, Florida since 2005. Among the released materials, an email from a female individual contained allegations against Judd.

=== Nicole Junkermann ===
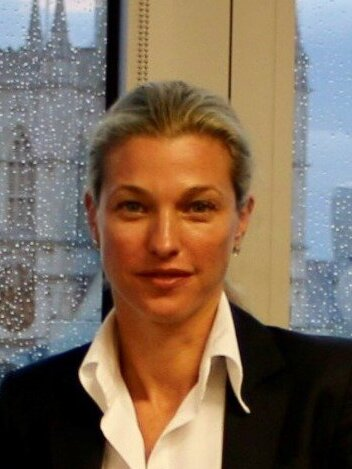
Nicole Junkermann

Nicole Junkermann is a German entrepreneur and investor. Documents released as part of the files show that after his 2008 conviction Junkermann was in close friendship, and in repeated email correspondence with the financier and convicted sex offender over several years from the early 2010s.

=== Mona Juul ===
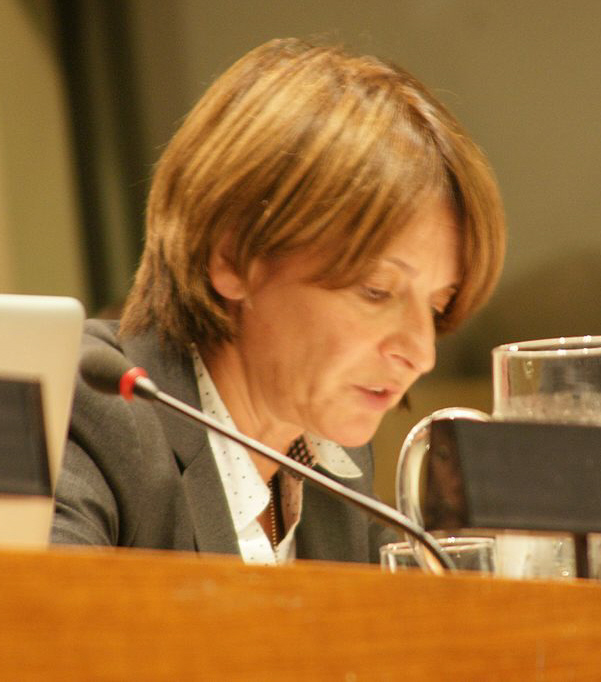
Mona Juul

Mona Juul is a Norwegian diplomat, former permanent representative to the United Nations, and wife of Terje Rød-Larsen. Juul resigned her position as ambassador to Jordan and Iraq on February 9, 2026, over her "serious failure of judgement" in her ties to Epstein.

== K ==
=== Dean Kamen ===
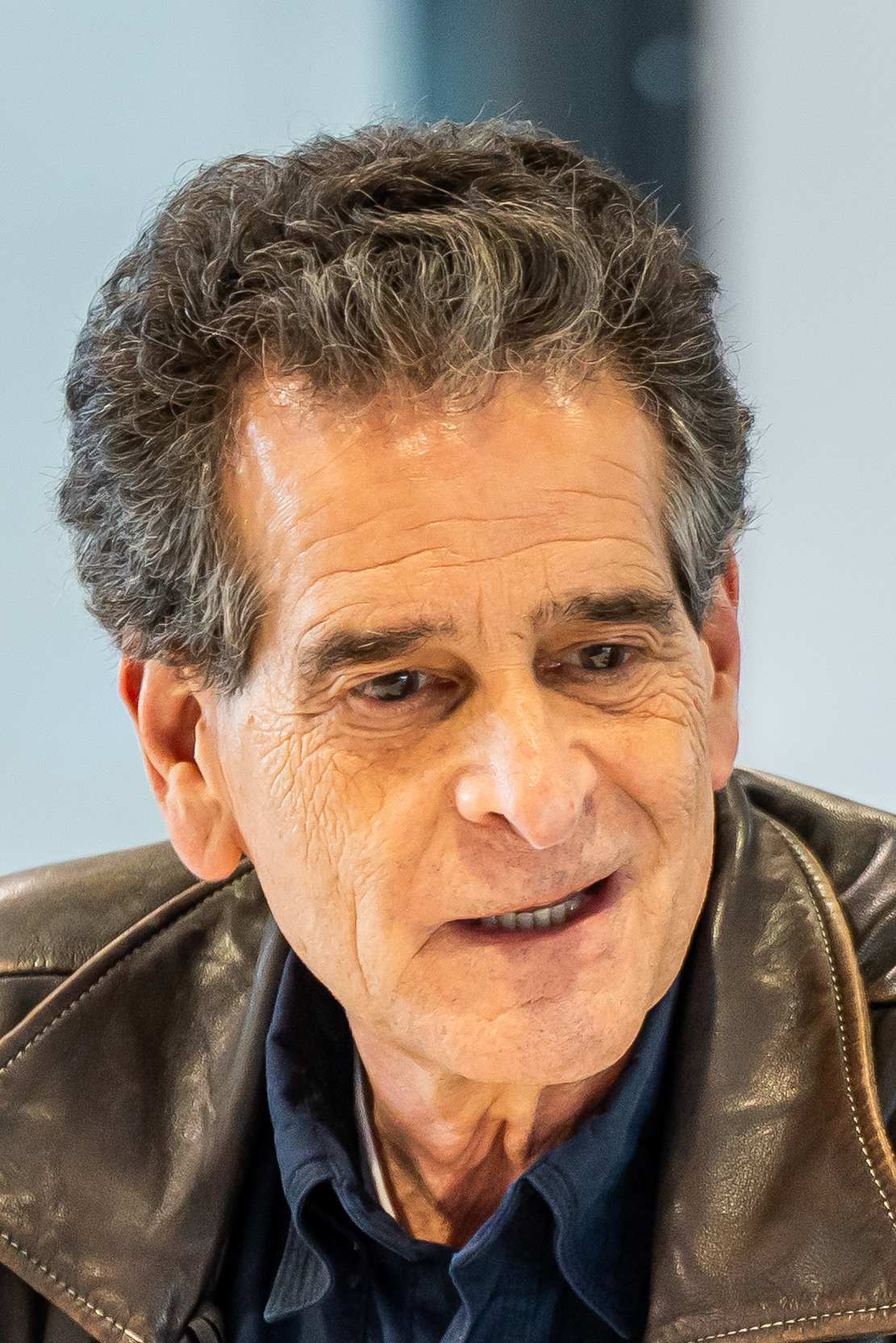
Dean Kamen

Dean Kamen invented the Segway and iBOT. Photographs show Kamen with Epstein and Ghislaine Maxwell. Emails revealed he visited Epstein's private island in 2013, and discussed "which flight Dean prefers the girls to be on". That same year, Epstein connected Kamen with Nadia Marcinko and Kamen hired her to provide flight training for his employees at DEKA. She also started her own aviation company at that time, registered at DEKA's address. In February 2026, Kamen resigned from the board of Beta Technologies over his ties with Epstein. On March 11, 2026, Kamen voluntarily resigned from the FIRST Board of Directors and withdrew from all FIRST activities.

=== Brad S. Karp ===
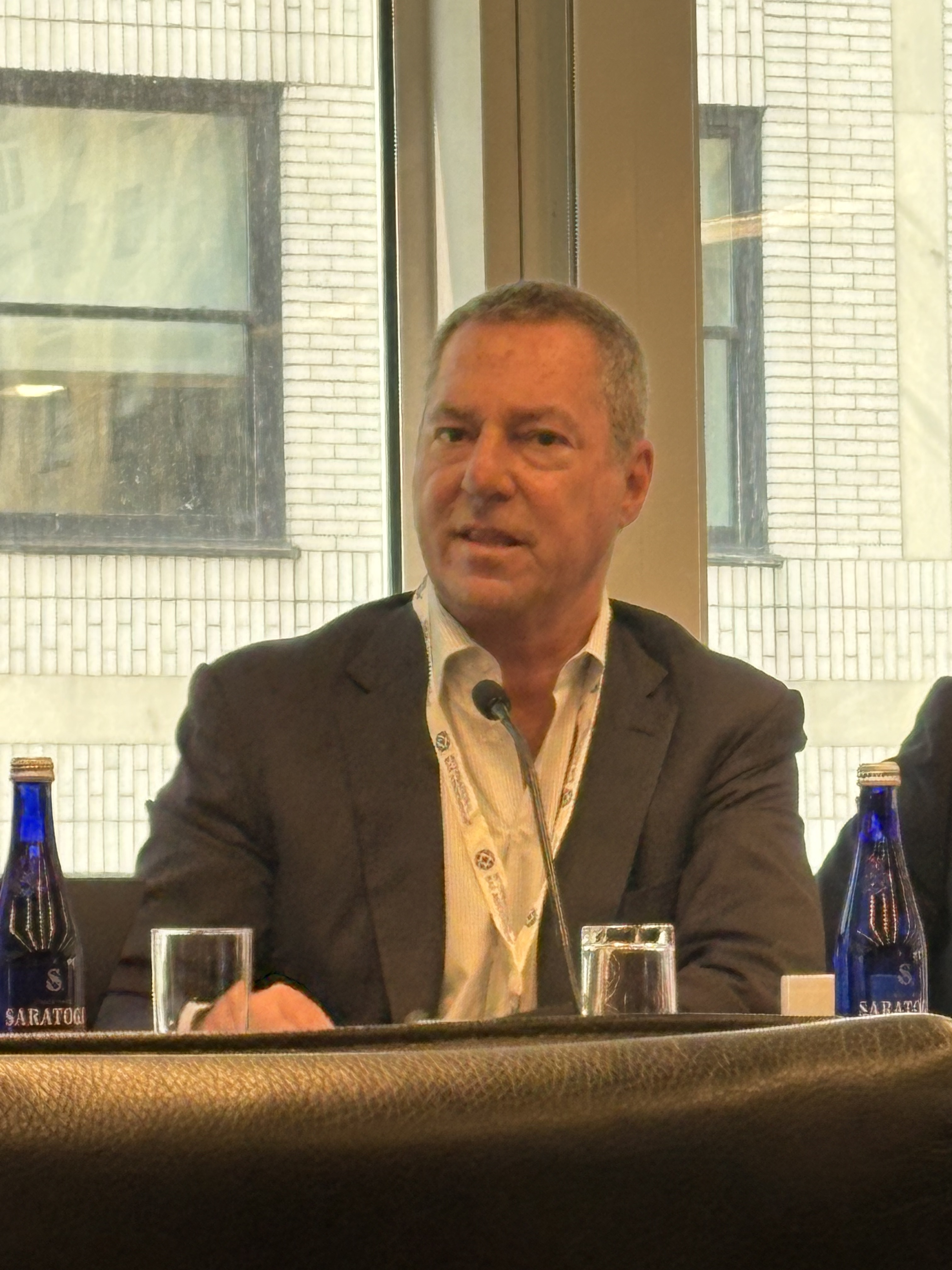
Brad S. Karp

Brad S. Karp is the chair of Paul Weiss who attended dinners at Epstein's Upper East Side residence. In a 2015 email, Karp thanked Epstein for an immomerable evening; Epstein replied he'll often be reinvited. In a concurrent exchange, Epstein asked Karp about revoking a woman's visa; Karp acquiesced. Karp emailed Epstein in 2016 to help getting his son a job on an Allen movie. In February 2019, Karp and Epstein tried to find legal representation for Robert Kraft and former Citigroup president John Havens, both ensnared in a Florida prostitution crackdown; charges were later dropped. Paul Weiss stated the firm represented Leon Black in fee disputes with Epstein, and denied that they or Karp represented him. In February 2026, Karp resigned as chair of his law firm, and stepped down from the board of trustees at Union College.

=== Robert F. Kennedy Jr. ===
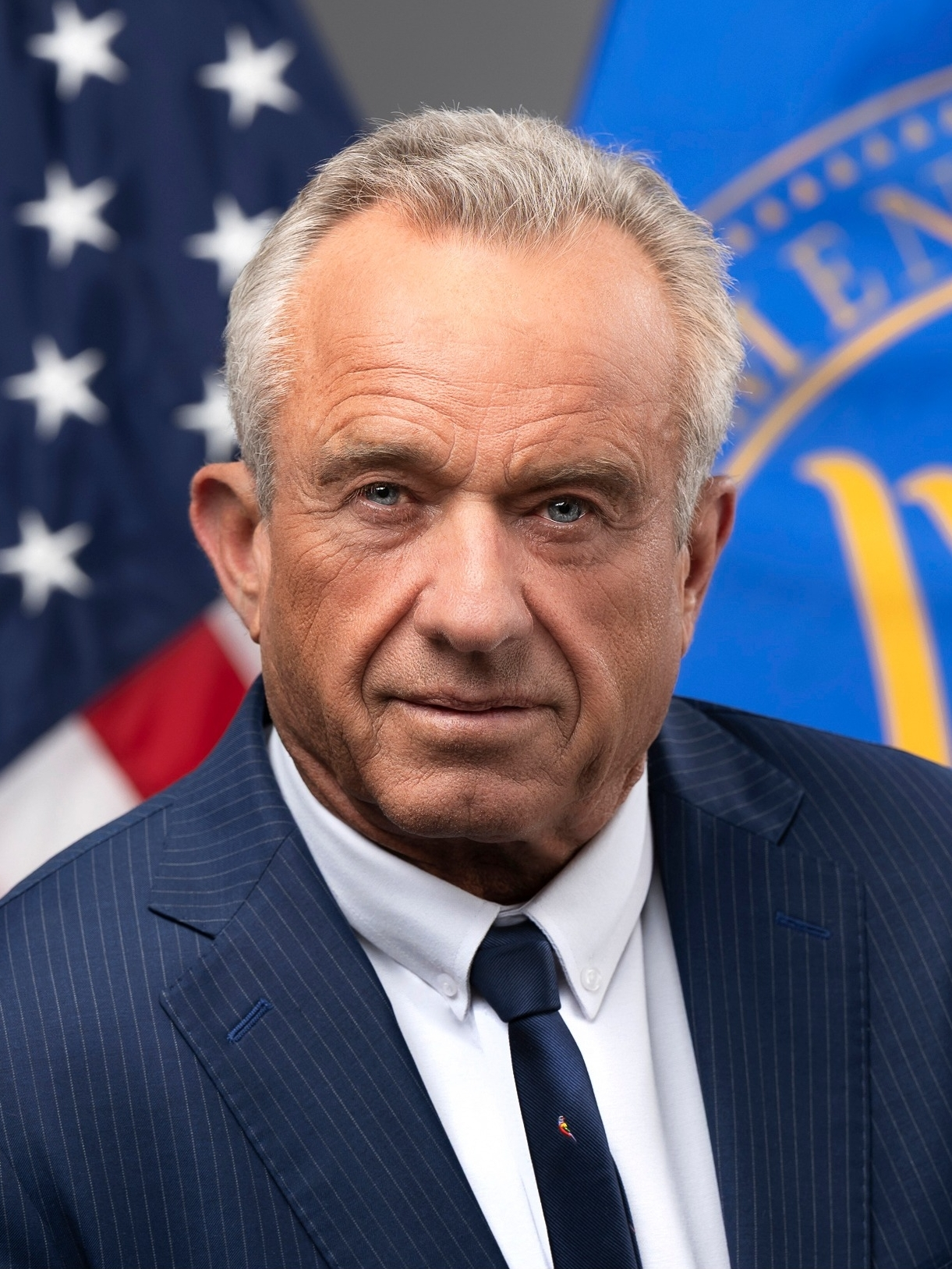
Robert F. Kennedy Jr.

Robert F. Kennedy Jr. is currently serving as the United States Secretary of Health and Human Services. Kennedy Jr. admitted during his presidential campaign that he flew on Epstein's plane. Emails and audio transcripts within the files reveal that Robert F. Kennedy Jr. had joined Epstein and Ghislaine Maxwell on two vacation trips c. 2012–2013.

=== Gary King ===
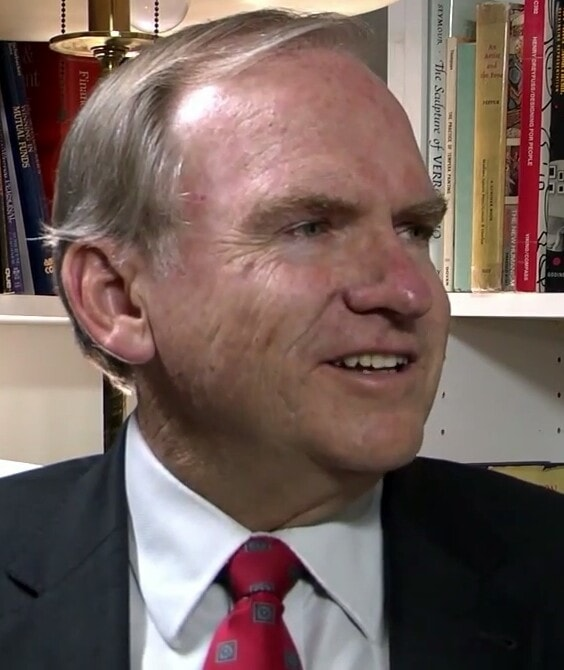
Gary King

Gary King is a lawyer and politician who was the attorney general of New Mexico from 2007–2015, and a nominee for New Mexico governor in 2014. Epstein purchased his Zorro Ranch from King's father, Governor Bruce King, in 1993.

Gary King nurtured a relationship with Epstein through private dinners and visits to Epstein's New Mexico ranch. Epstein made financial contributions to King's political campaigns from the early 1990s through at least 2014, sometimes funneling money through companies to avoid press coverage of the donations while King was running on the issue of prosecuting child sex offenders, and King flew on Epstein's private jet. King stated he didn't remember meeting Epstein, and didn't know the jet was his.

=== Stephen Kosslyn ===
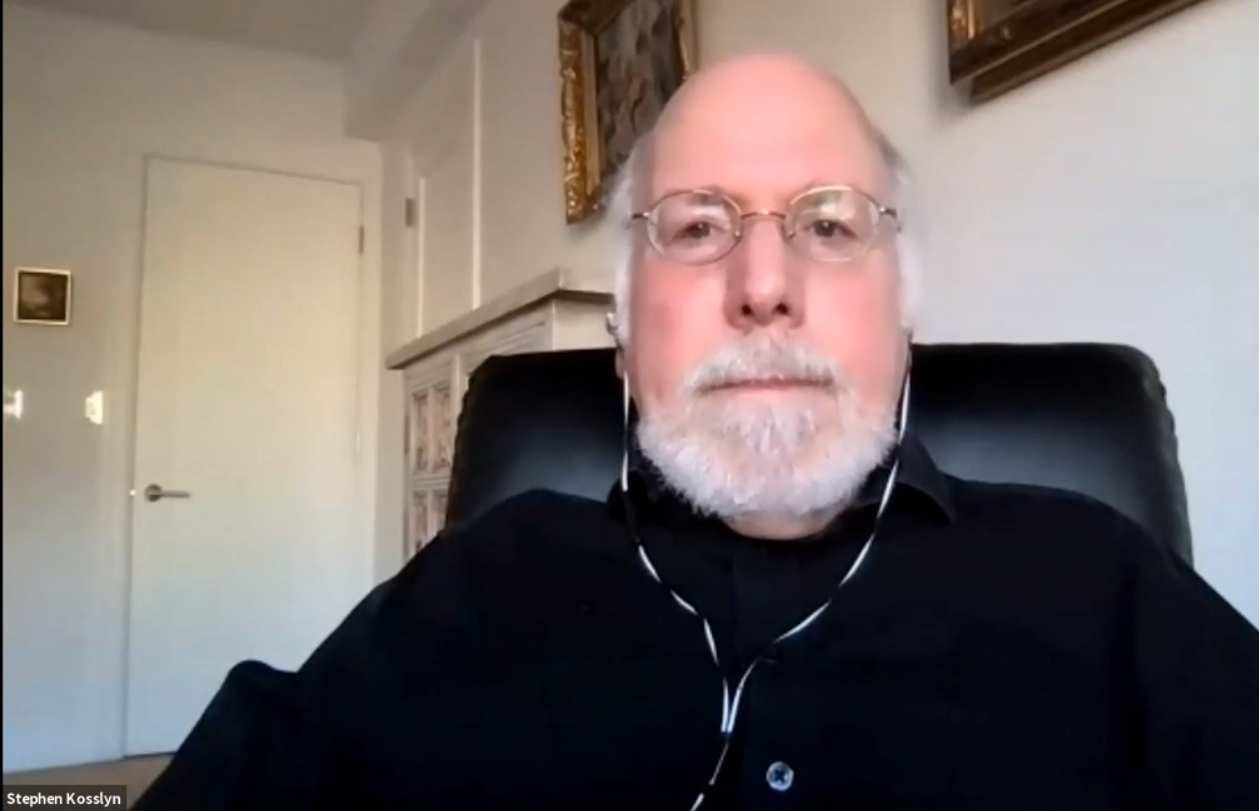
Stephen Kosslyn

Stephen Kosslyn is an American psychologist and neuroscientist, former chair of the psychology department and dean of social sciences at Harvard University. Between 1998 and 2002, Epstein gave Kosslyn's psychology department $200,000 in donations. In 2008, Kosslyn visited Epstein in jail. Released emails show Epstein discussing the start of his jail sentence in Florida, and Kosslyn helping Epstein draft scripts for reporters, to restore Epstein's public image. In 2010, Kosslyn provided a referral to Epstein, when asked for the name of a New York child psychologist for a 15-year-old girl.

=== Bobby Kotick ===
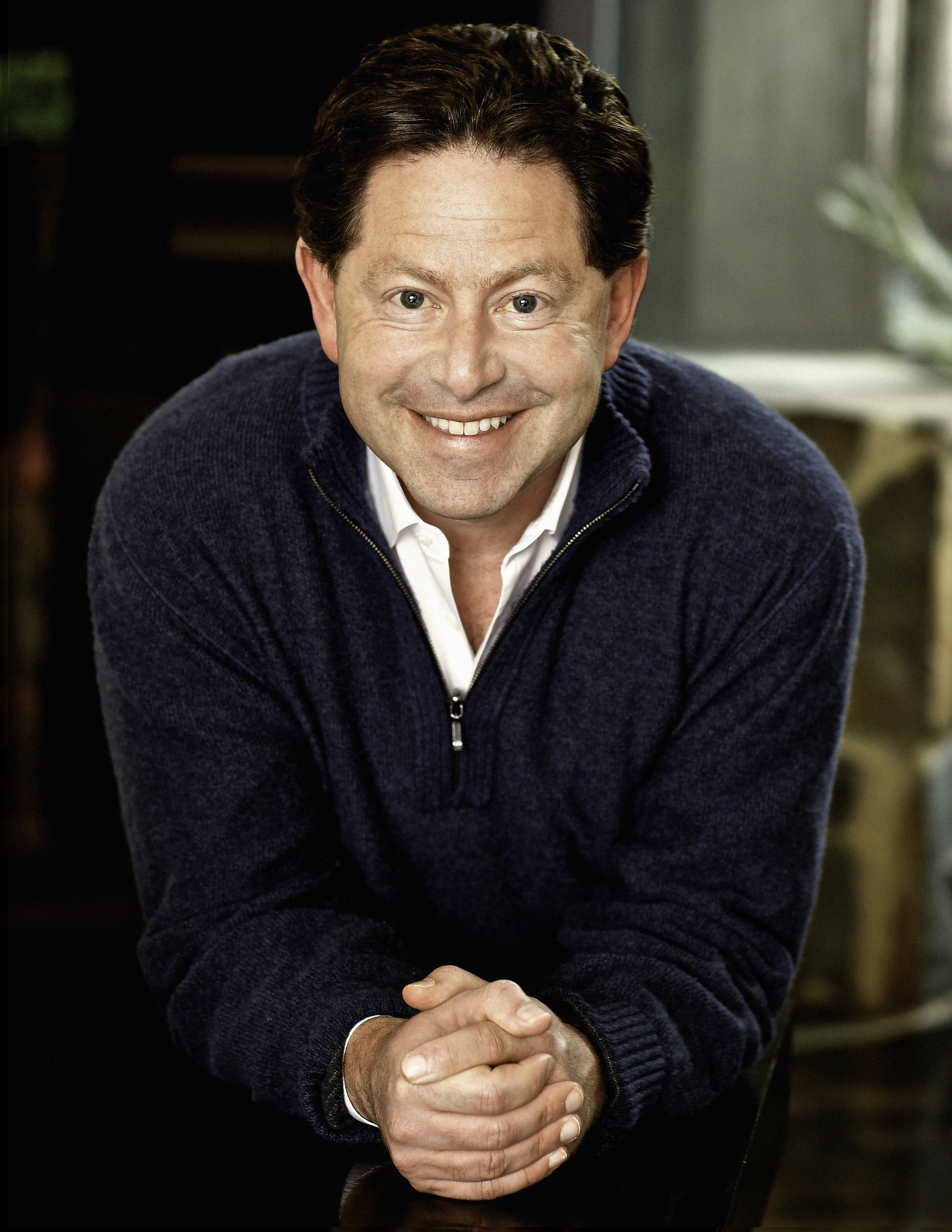
Bobby Kotick

Bobby Kotick is an American former CEO of Activision Blizzard and Activision. Epstein invited Kotick to events with "the girls", and asked Kotick in May 2013 about adding microtransactions to Activision's game series Call of Duty, a month after they had been added.

=== Lawrence Krauss ===
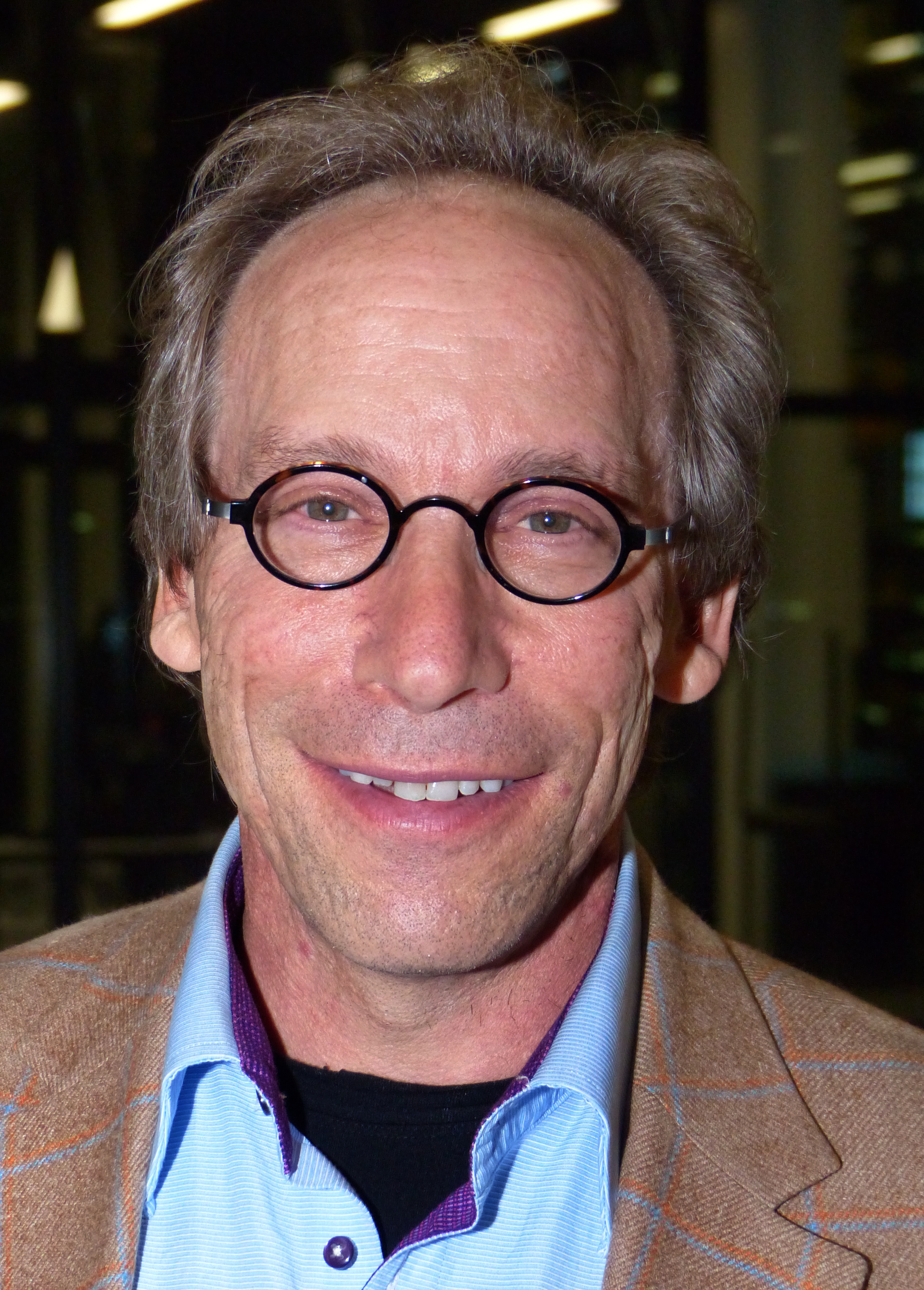
Lawrence Krauss

Lawrence Krauss is a cosmologist. Krauss reached out to Epstein in 2017 for how to respond on sexual misconduct allegations; Epstein recommended to write a cover letter denying everything. In 2018, Epstein forwarded Krauss a list of attendees for the Women in the World Summit; Krauss responded, "Let's do a men of the world conference", with among others Kevin Spacey, Bill Clinton, Al Franken, and Woody Allen. Krauss announced his retirement from Arizona State University in 2018, and stated he never hid his association with Epstein.

=== Robert Lawrence Kuhn ===
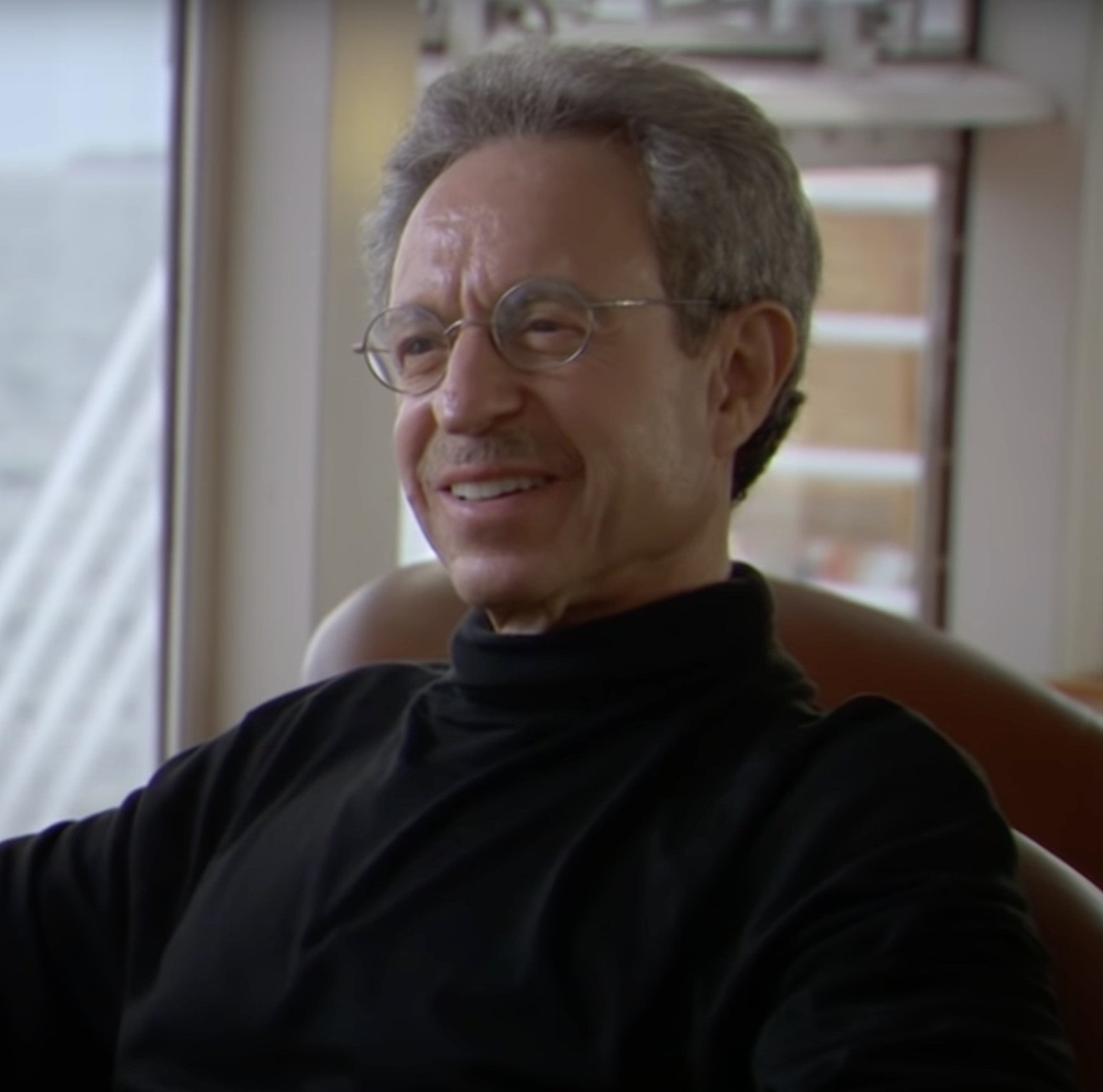
Robert Lawrence Kuhn

Robert Lawrence Kuhn is an American investment banker and writer. Kuhn's Closer to Truth television series received partial funding from Epstein.

== L ==
=== Miroslav Lajčák ===
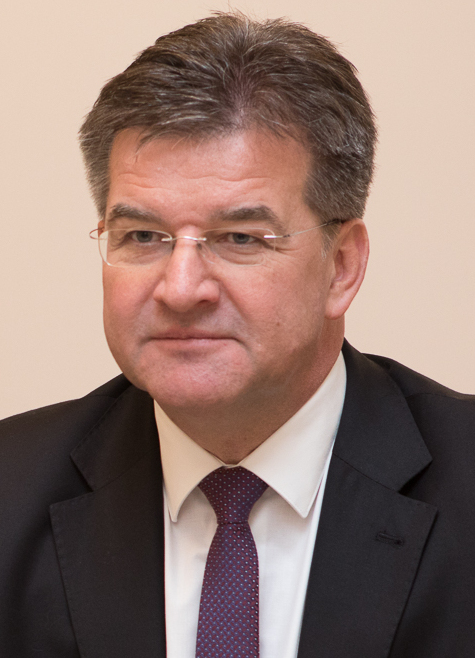
Miroslav Lajčák

Miroslav Lajčák is a former President of the United Nations General Assembly with whom Epstein exchanged emails between 2017 and 2019. In one email, Lajčák asked Epstein to introduce him to young girls and to participate in Epstein's private games. Photographs showed them in Vienna and Bratislava. Lajčák and Epstein discussed expanding the establishment of a network of far-right political groups in Europe. Lajčák stepped down from his position as national security advisor after the release of his emails with Epstein.

=== Mark Landon ===
Mark Landon is an OB-GYN specializing in high-risk pregnancies at the Ohio State University Wexner Medical Center and a professor at Ohio State University College of Medicine. He received payments from Epstein and his associates in the early 2000s, when Epstein owned property in New Albany, Ohio, adjacent to Leslie Wexler's.

After his name appeared in the released Epstein files, Landon stated he was a paid consultant for Epstein's money management firm, advising on potential biotech investments from 2001 to 2005.

In a January 2006 email, Darren Indyke asked Epstein if they still were paying Landon, on the understanding that "Landon's agreement requires quarterly payments of $30k to be made to Landon on the 15th of January, April, July and October", Epstein responded: "75 per year."

=== Caroline Lang ===
Caroline Lang is a French film producer and the daughter of politician Jack Lang. The 2026 Epstein files release revealed that she was co-owner, with Epstein, of Prytanee LLC, a company based in the US Virgin Islands, which she had failed to declare to the tax authorities. She was also named as a recipient of US $5 million in Epstein's will, though she denied all knowledge of it. After the documents were made public and prosecutors opened a financial investigation for tax fraud and money laundering into Lang and her father, she resigned from the Syndicat des producteurs indépendants, a French industry association for independent film-makers.

=== Jack Lang ===
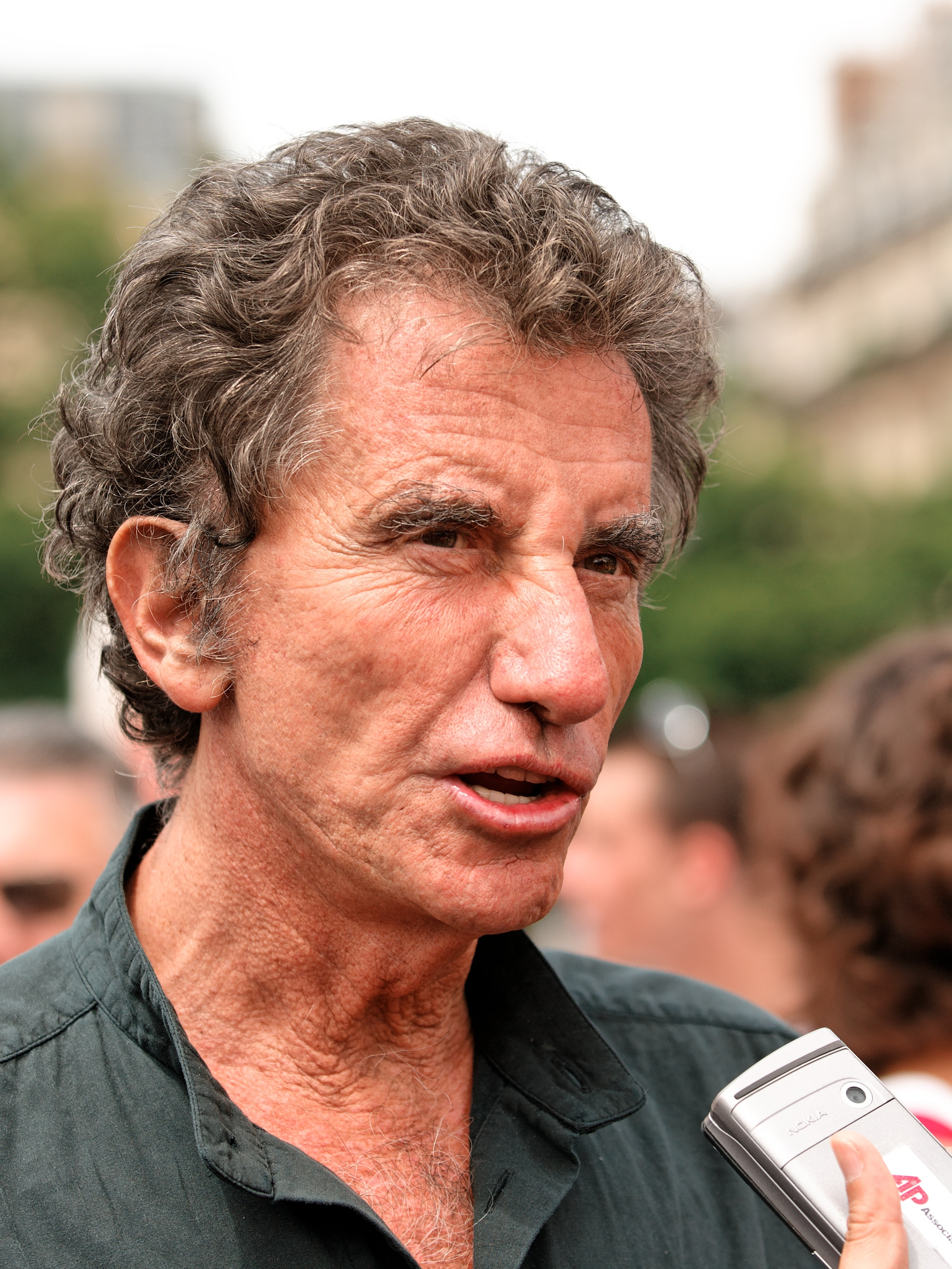
Jack Lang

Jack Lang is a French politician who has served as minister of culture, minister of education, and in the National Assembly. He intermittently corresponded with Epstein between 2012 and 2019. On February 6, 2026, he resigned as head of the Paris-based Arab World Institute after their contacts were revealed and prosecutors opened a financial investigation for tax fraud and money laundering into Lang and his daughter Caroline Lang. His name appears in the files more than 600 times.

=== Ronald Lauder ===
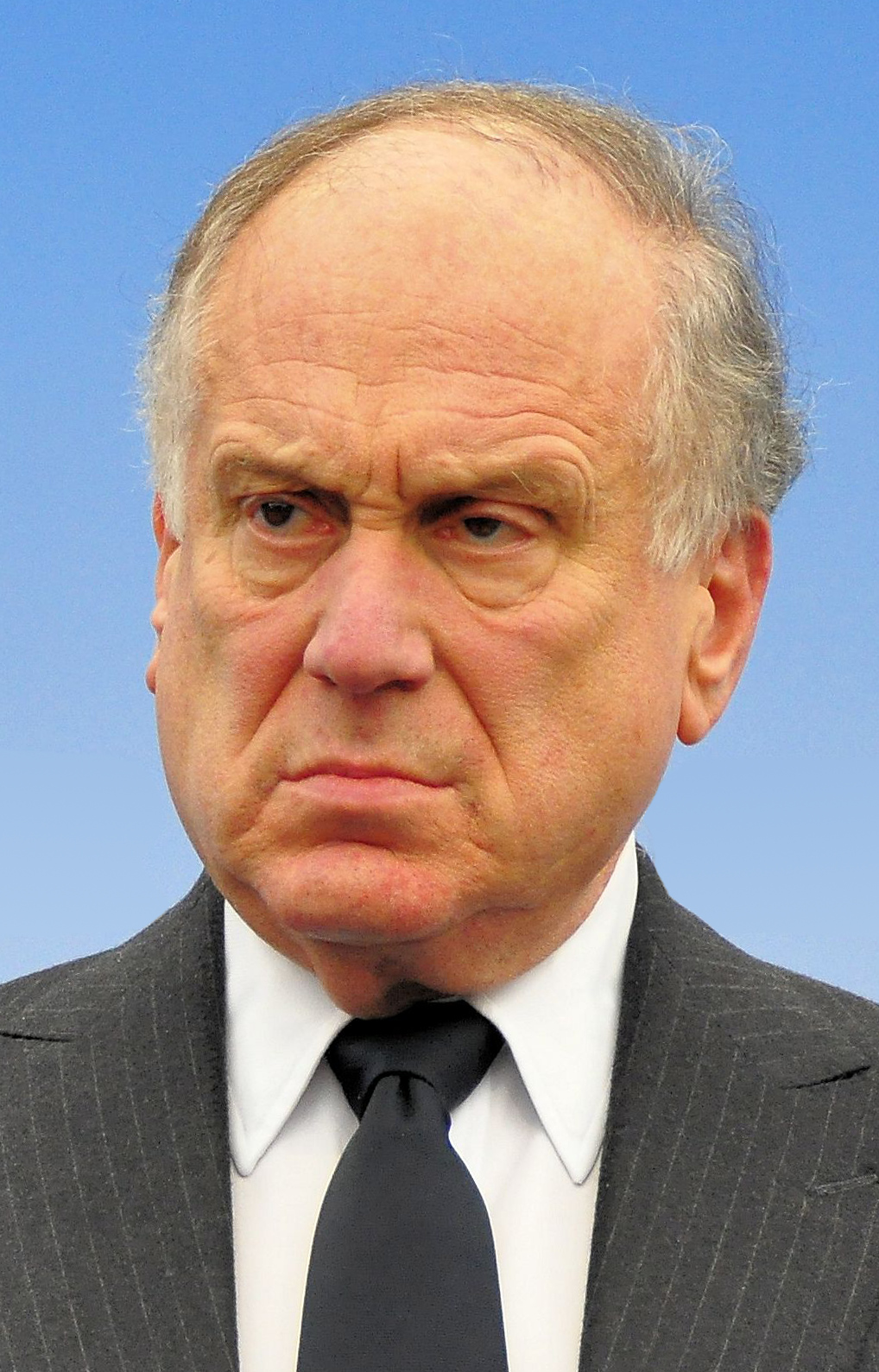
Ronald Lauder

Ronald Lauder is an American businessman. The billionaire's name appears in the Epstein files over 900 times. In 2014, Epstein set up a limited liability company for Lauder to share ownership with Leon Black of a $25 million artwork by Kurt Schwitters.

=== Julian Leese ===
Julian Leese is the younger son of Douglas Leese, one of the architects of the billion-dollar Al-Yamamah arms deal. Epstein was "mentored" by Douglas and befriended sons Julian and Nick while on a trip to England in the early 1980s after he left Bear Stearns. Julian and Sulayem invited Epstein on multiple shooting and hunting trips in England, Argentina, and many countries in Africa after Epstein's 2008 conviction which resulted in restricted access to guns in some countries. The emails included Epstein sharing a photo of one woman who he said had "obedience training" to carry his guns and ammunition. Julian remained friends with Epstein until his death.

=== Nick Leese ===
Nick Leese is a film producer and eldest son of Douglas Leese. Nick contributed to Epstein's birthday book a story about massage classes and their escapades at nightclubs and private clubs, including a story about his father and an associate sexually assaulting his father's mistress.

=== Shelley Anne Lewis ===
Shelley Anne Lewis reportedly is the daughter of the founder of the Cash Generator pawnbroking chain. She was working for Christie's auction house in New York when she met Epstein. They had a relationship from 1999–2002 and remained in contact until at least 2018. Her relationship with Epstein overlapped with the time Giuffre alleged she was coerced into having sex with Andrew Mountbatten-Windsor, and so in 2018 Maxwell and Epstein discussed asking her to serve as a witness for them.

=== Howard Lutnick ===
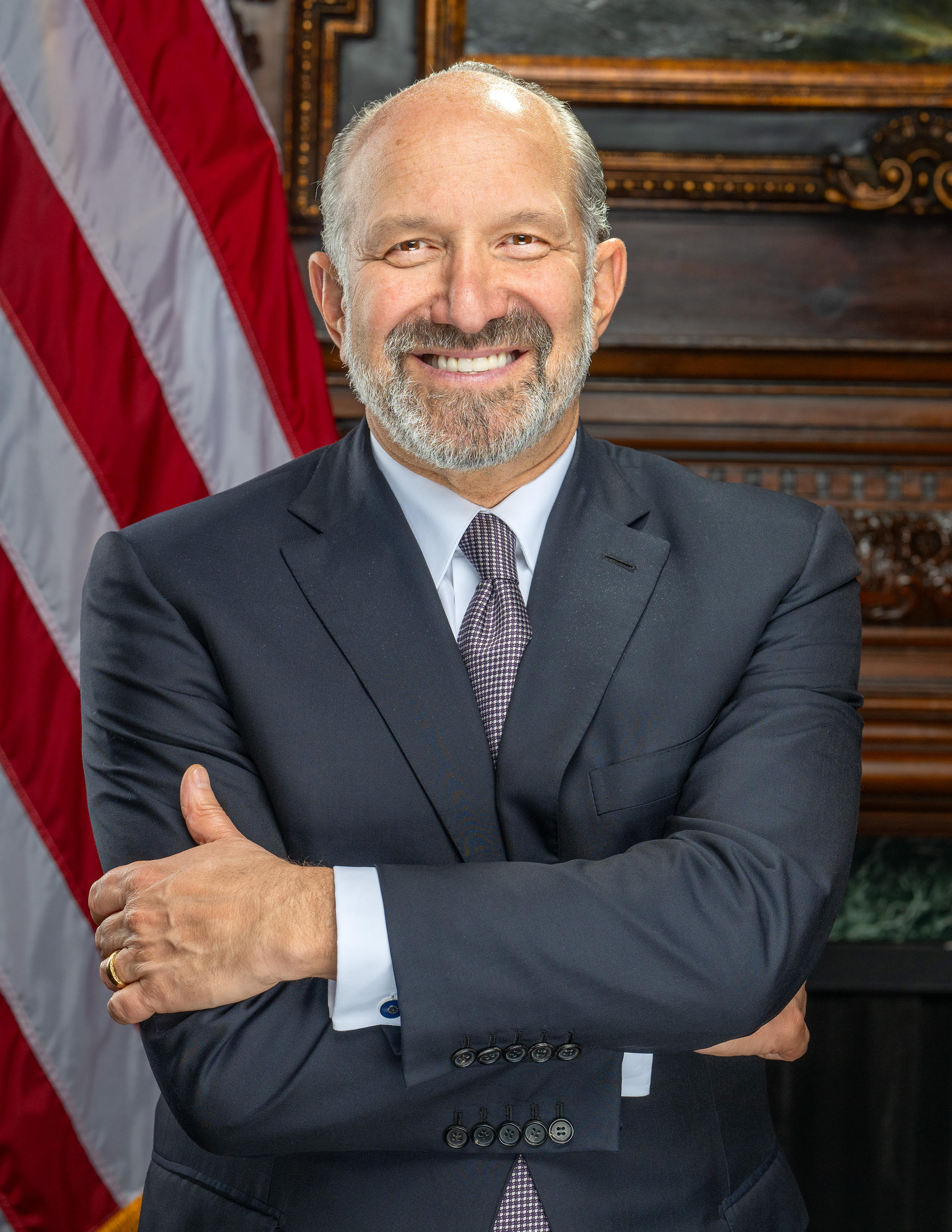
Howard Lutnick

Howard Lutnick is the United States Secretary of Commerce. In 2012, he coordinated a visit to Epstein's Caribbean compound, though he had previously said he severed ties with Epstein around 2005. CNN found other interactions: both invested in a venture in 2013, Lutnick invited Epstein to attend a Hillary Clinton 2015 fundraiser, Epstein donated US$50,000 for a 2017 dinner honouring Lutnick; they also exchanged in 2017 about the expansion of the Frick Collection in front of their homes.

== M ==
=== Thomas Magnani ===
Thomas Magnani was Epstein's personal dentist, a graduate of Columbia University's dental college, and a faculty member on their admissions review committee. After the dental college rejected Karyna Shuliak's admission application, Magnani used his influence with the vice-dean for academic affairs Moss-Salentijn to revive her application. Columbia removed Magnani from the faculty and admissions review committee.

=== Peter Mandelson ===
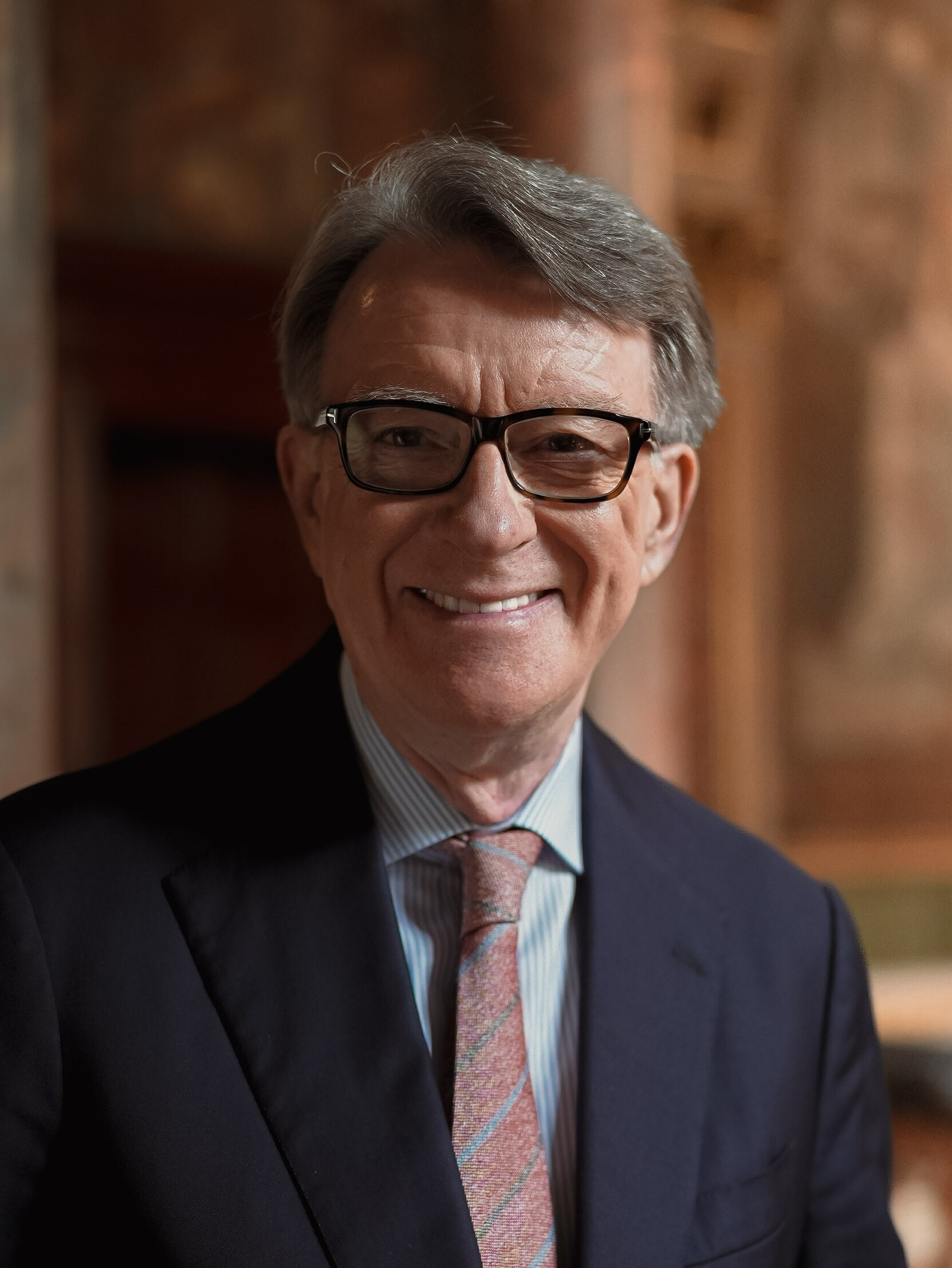
Peter Mandelson, Baron Mandelson

Peter Mandelson, Lord Mandelson is a British former politician and diplomat. Between 2003-4, three $25,000 payments referencing Mandelson were sent from Epstein's JP Morgan account. Mandelson stated he had no record or recollection of receiving the sums, and did not know whether the documents were authentic. In 2009, documents show Epstein sent £10,000 (~ $15578) to Mandelson's husband. While Epstein was serving jail term, Mandelson asked to stay at one of his properties. In June 2009, Mandelson allegedly leaked to Epstein a Downing Street asset sales proposal and tax policy plans. A December 2009 email from Mandelson suggested JPMorgan Chase boss Jamie Dimon should "mildly threaten" Alistair Darling over a bankers' tax by referring to US banks as buyers of UK gilts, as well as investment plans in London. Mandelson stands accused of lobbying the US government in 2010 to water down proposed restrictions on US bank trading, on behalf of Epstein and Jes Staley. On March 31, 2010, Mandelson allegedly forwarded meeting minutes between Darling and the National Economic Council director, Larry Summers, five minutes after receiving them. The following day, Mandelson met Summers and forwarded Epstein the meeting minutes after he received them. On May 9, 2010, Mandelson gave Epstein advance notice of a €500bn bailout from the EU to save the euro. The next day, Mandelson emailed Epstein saying "finally got him to go today", with Gordon Brown resigning a day later. Files releases included a redacted image of Mandelson in his underwear standing next to an unidentified woman; Mandelson said he could not place it. In September 2025, Mandelson was dismissed as the UK's ambassador to the US. In response to the document release, Mandelson stated he had been "wrong" to continue his association with Epstein, and apologised "unequivocally to the women and girls who suffered". In February 2026, Mandelson was forced to resign from the Labour Party and House of Lords. On 23 February, Mandelson was arrested on suspicion of misconduct in public office.

=== Kenneth Mapp ===
Kenneth Mapp is the former Governor of the United States Virgin Islands. An email shows that in 2016, Mapp asked Epstein in to borrow $275 million for the Virgin Islands government. Mapp reportedly met with Epstein numerous times in private.

=== Nadia Marcinko ===
Nadia Marcinko, also known as Nadia Marcinkova, is a Slovak-born model and pilot. In 2007, federal prosecutors identified Marcinko as a potential co-conspirator of Epstein's; as part of a plea deal, she was not prosecuted. In 2008, she visited Epstein dozens of times while he was in jail. It was around this time she began taking flight lessons; by 2010, she was an influencer under the moniker "Gulfstream Girl", and later "Global Girl". In 2013, Epstein connected her with Dean Kamen and Kamen hired her to provide flight training for his employees at DEKA. She also started her own aviation company at that time, registered at DEKA's address.

A 2019 CNN article stated that Marcinko may be a "victim" of Epstein as well as an "accomplice".

=== Ghislaine Maxwell ===
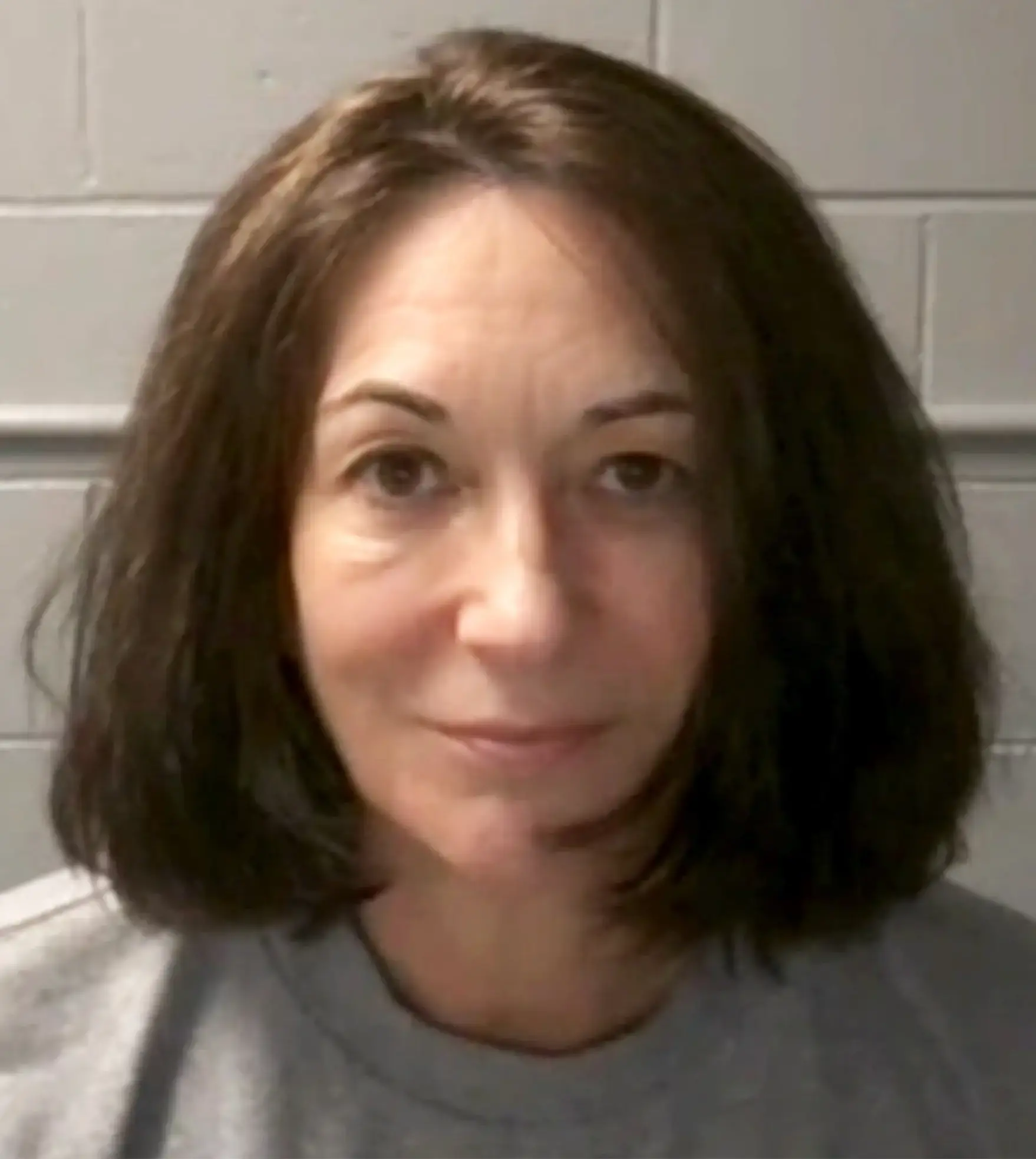
Ghislaine Maxwell

Ghislaine Maxwell is a British former socialite, convicted child sex trafficker, and daughter of Robert Maxwell. She was a prominent former business partner of Epstein. In 2021, she was found guilty of child sex trafficking and other offences in connection with Epstein. The Epstein files contain accounts of her crimes by victims as well as details about court testimonies from accusers and civil claims against her.

=== Robert Maxwell ===
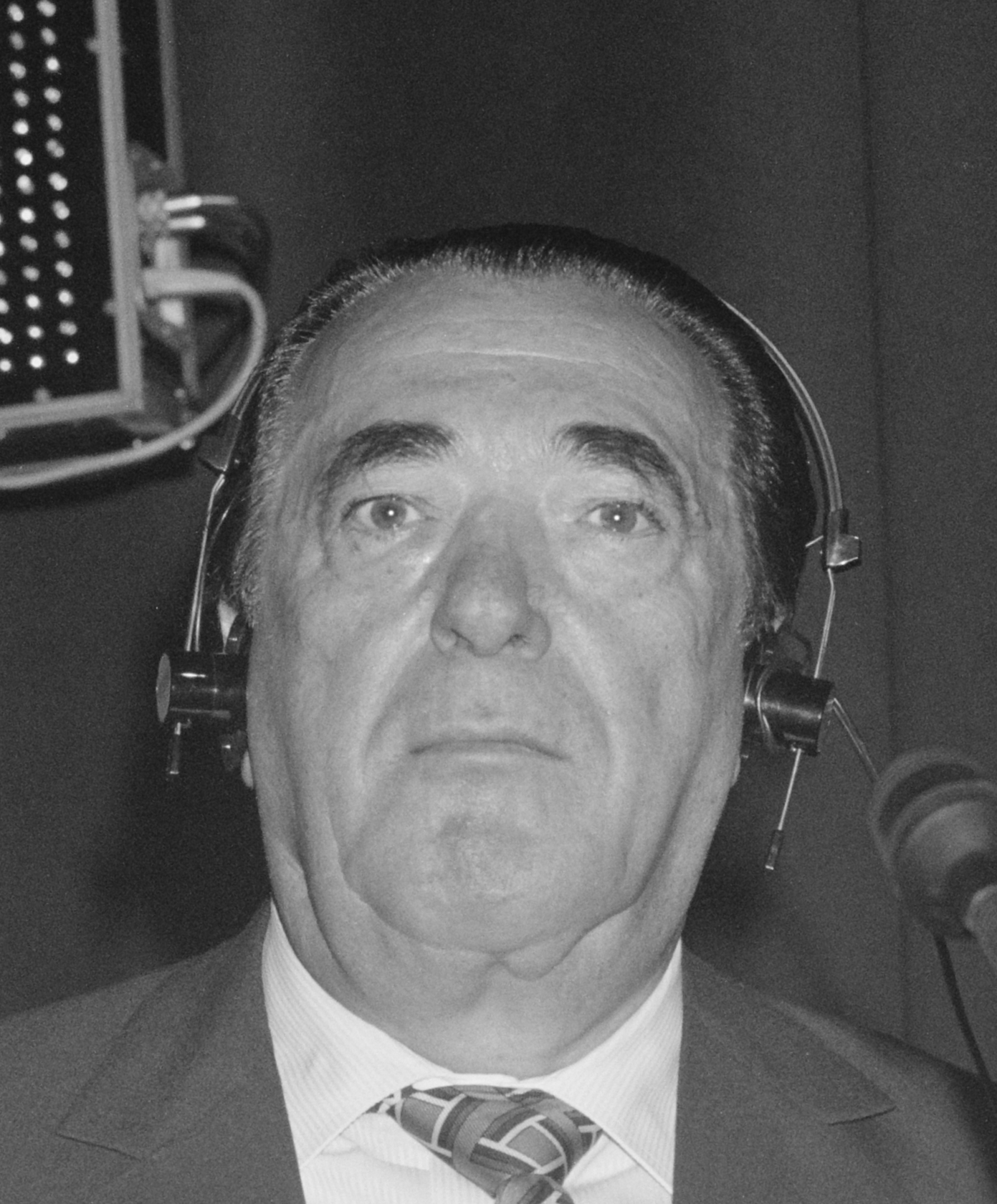
Robert Maxwell

Robert Maxwell was a Czechoslovak-born British-French media proprietor and politician. Epstein wrote an email speculating about the circumstances surrounding Maxwell's 1991 death, alleging that Maxwell was a spy working for Mossad and was killed because he attempted to blackmail the agency for £400 million, threatening to reveal his spy activity if not paid.

=== Matthew Menchel ===
Matthew Menchel was the chief criminal prosecutor who spearheaded Epstein's 2007 sweetheart deal, after which he left the Department of Justice and continued to befriend Epstein. They exchanged emails from 2010–2018 and shared multiple dinners and meetings. Some of these contacts included Epstein requesting advice or legal representation from Menchel in other legal disputes.

=== Queen Mette-Marit of Norway ===
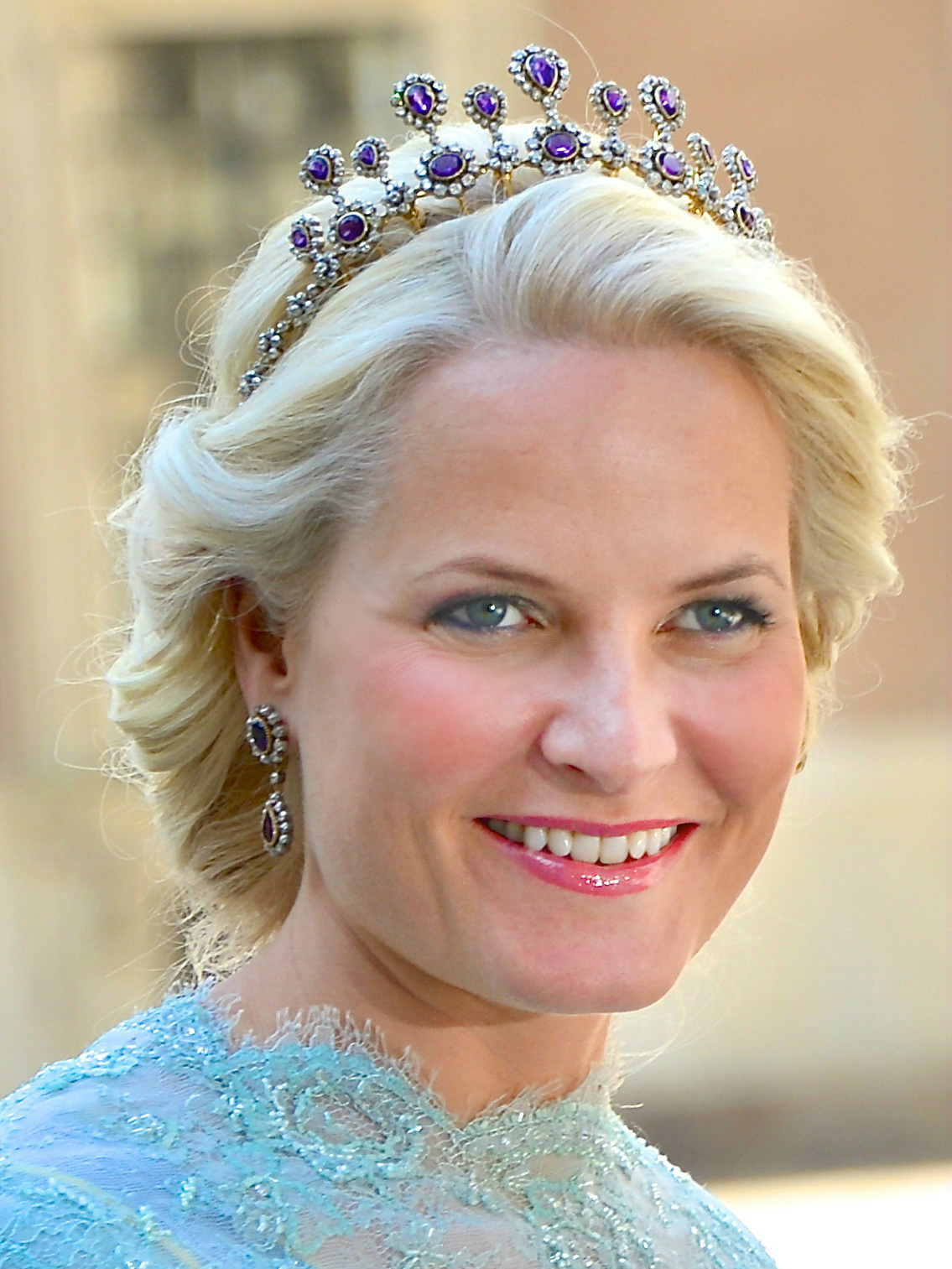
Queen Mette-Marit of Norway

Queen Mette-Marit of Norway was mentioned over a thousand times in the Epstein files, with communications spanning 2011 to 2014. Documents showed she spent four days at Epstein's house in Palm Beach in January 2013; one message implied she was aware of his 2008 jail term. In one email from her account, Epstein was asked whether a mother should suggest naked women carrying a surfboard for her son's wallpaper. Mette-Marit expressed regret for her contact with Epstein, and solidarity with his victims.

=== Marvin Minsky ===
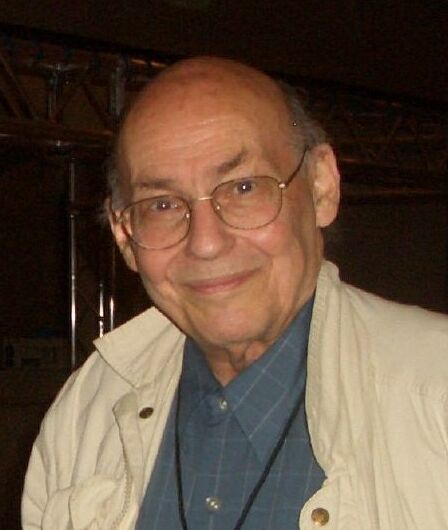
Marvin Minsky

Marvin Minsky was an American cognitive and computer scientist. In an unsealed deposition from May 2016, Virginia Giuffre stated that she had been directed to have sex with Minsky during a visit to Epstein's compound in the US Virgin Islands. Minsky's widow, Gloria Rudisch, denied this, claiming they were always together during their visits to the island. Minsky also organized two academic symposia on artificial intelligence at Epstein's compound: one in 2002, and another one in 2011.

=== George J. Mitchell ===
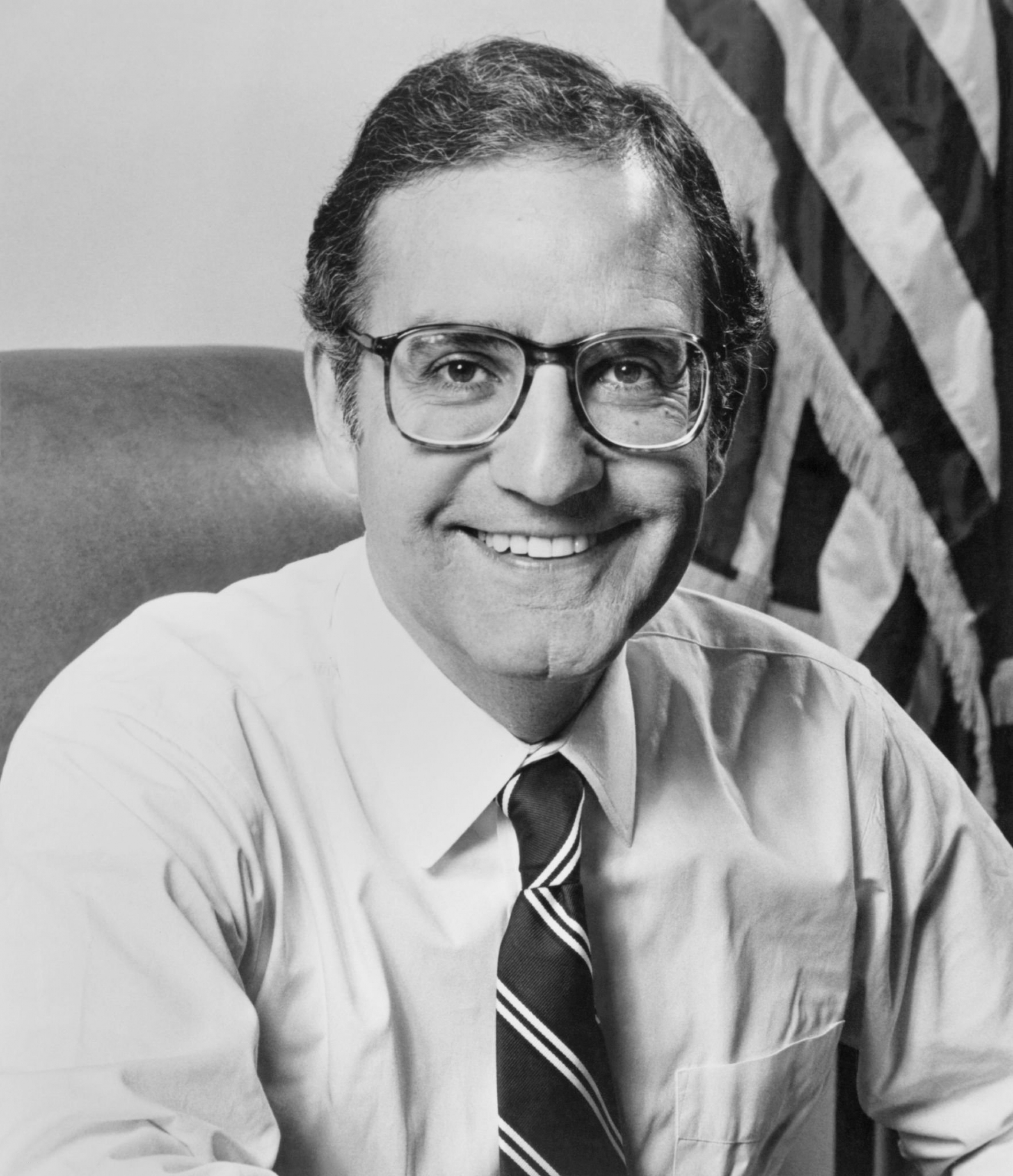
George J. Mitchell

George J. Mitchell is an American politician, diplomat, and lawyer. A 2003 handwritten letter in Epstein's "birthday book" showed the former U.S. Senate majority leader describing his friendship with Epstein as "a blessing." Documents released in January 2026 showed a continued relationship between Mitchell and Epstein following Epstein's 2008 conviction, including emails and scheduled appointments; a November 2013 email listed "10:30am Appt w/Senator George Mitchell". The files also contained references to an allegation by Virginia Giuffre, first made in a May 2016 deposition, that Ghislaine Maxwell had directed her to have sex with Mitchell.

A spokesperson for Mitchell stated that he never met, spoke to, or had any contact with Giuffre or any underage girls, and that the allegation was based on mistaken identity. Following the document release, the US–Ireland Alliance announced it would remove Mitchell's name from the George J. Mitchell Scholarship Program.

=== Mohammed bin Salman, Crown Prince of Saudi Arabia ===
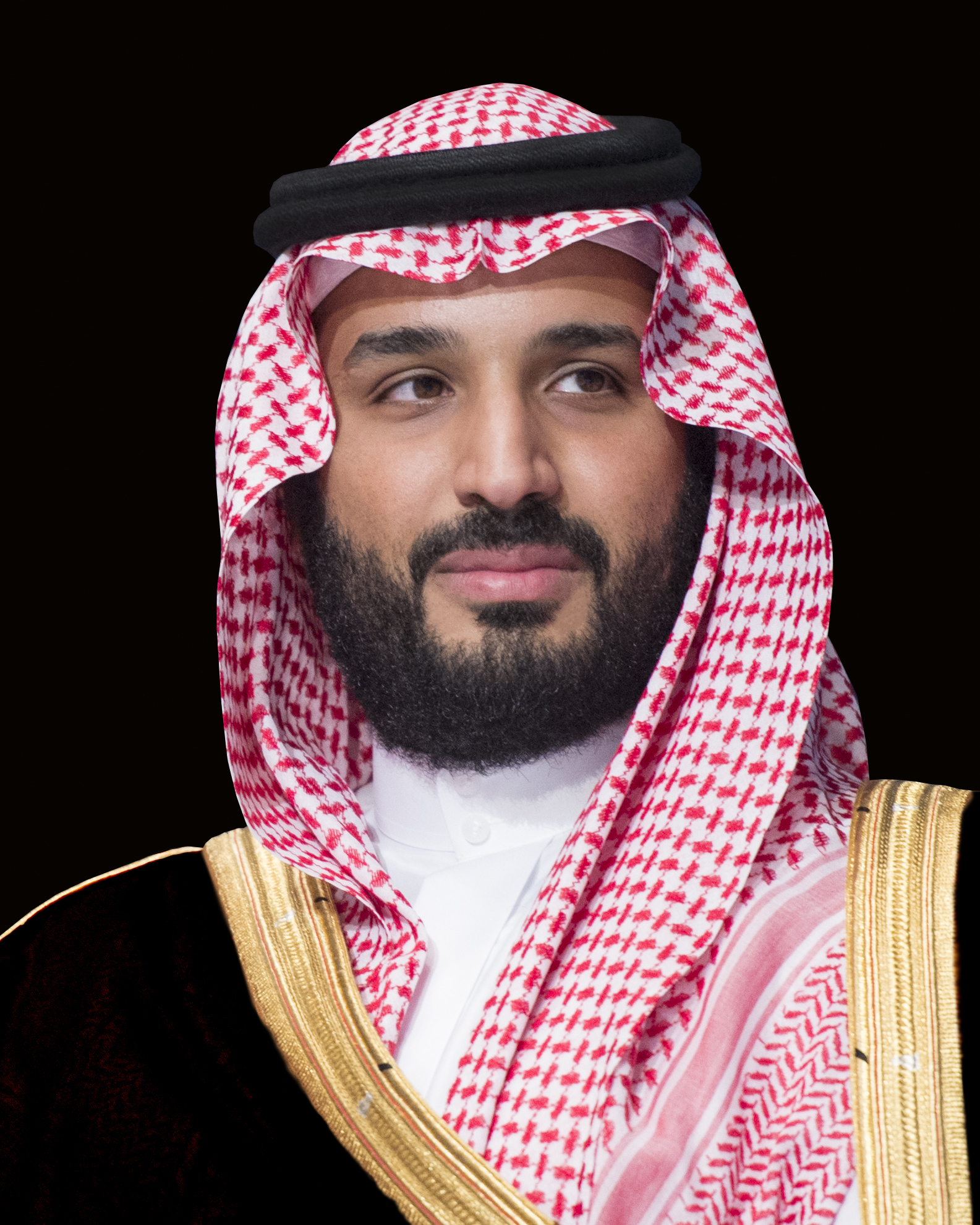
Mohammed bin Salman

Mohammed bin Salman is the Crown Prince and Prime Minister of Saudi Arabia. In a 2016 email Epstein wrote that Mohammed had gifted him a tent, "carpets and all", following a trip to Saudi Arabia. Epstein also kept a framed photograph of himself and Mohammed in his New York townhouse.

=== Carol Montgomery ===
Carol Montgomery was one of several United States Customs and Border Protection officers who maintained a friendship with Epstein. Montgomery sent Epstein a "welcome home" email after he was released from jail, asked for his advice and a $200,000 loan, and invited him to visit her in Washington state.

=== Bruce Moskowitz ===
Dr. Bruce Moskowitz, a Palm Beach internist who was also part of Donald Trump's Mar-a-Lago Crowd, was Epstein's physician. He treated young women Epstein sent to him for gonorrhea and acne, and Moskowitz discussed the women's medical care with Epstein, helped Epstein evade government reporting of positive tests for venereal disease, and offered loyalty after Epstein's crimes were widely reported. In return, Epstein donated money to Moskowitz's foundations, invested venture capital in their son's efforts, and provided guest rooms for Moskowitz at Epstein's New Mexico ranch.

=== Letty Moss-Salentijn ===
Letty Moss-Salentijn was the vice-dean for academic affairs at Columbia University's dental college. After the dental college rejected Karyna Shuliak's admission application, she and Thomas Magnani worked together to have her admitted anyway. She later stepped down from her administrative roles at Columbia.

=== Andrew Mountbatten-Windsor ===
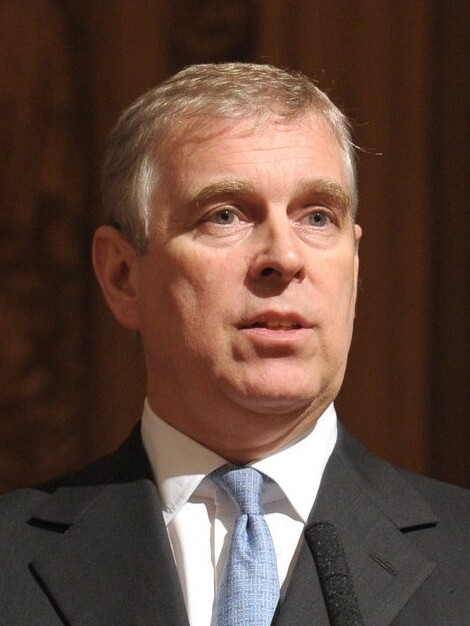
Andrew Mountbatten-Windsor

Andrew Mountbatten-Windsor is a member of the British royal family and former Duke of York. In a 2010 email exchange, Epstein offered to introduce then-Prince Andrew to a 26-year-old Russian woman, to which he replied he would be "delighted" to meet her. The same exchange showed the former royal inviting Epstein to have dinner at Buckingham Palace; it is unclear whether such a visit occurred. Epstein and Mountbatten-Windsor were pictured walking together in Central Park three months later; Mountbatten-Windsor had claimed he travelled to the US to end his friendship with Epstein in person in light of his conviction. The former royal was photographed with a woman lying on the ground in three undated photos. A photo showing Virginia Giuffre, Andrew, and Ghislaine Maxwell, which had been disputed by Andrew and Maxwell, appears to have been referenced in a 2015 email. Emails appear to show that between 2010–11, Andrew may have shared confidential information with Epstein about his official work as UK trade envoy. In 2025, Mountbatten-Windsor was stripped of his titles and evicted from his royal residence. In February 2026, Andrew was arrested on suspicion of misconduct in public office. He was released from custody, without being charged, and remains under investigation.

=== Robert Mugabe ===
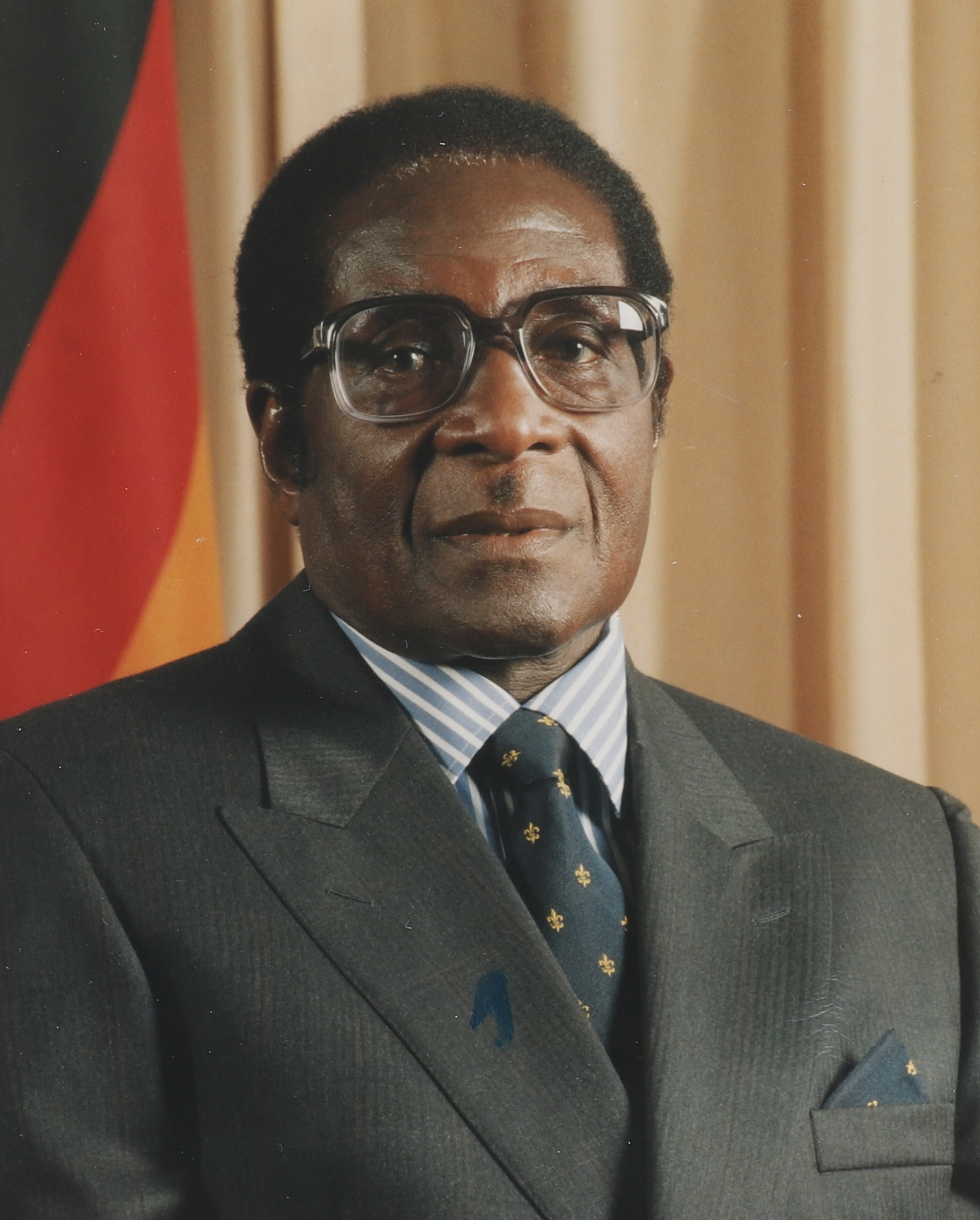
Robert Mugabe

Robert Mugabe was the leader of Zimbabwe from 1980 to 2017. In a 2015 email exchange, Japanese financer Joi Ito suggested Epstein meet Mugabe to talk about providing a new currency due to the Zimbabwean dollar's collapse due to hyperinflation.

An FBI report dated November 2017 said Epstein had provided Mugabe (and Vladimir Putin) with personal wealth management services. According to the BBC, Mugabe "may have had financial ties with Jeffrey Epstein".

=== Elon Musk ===
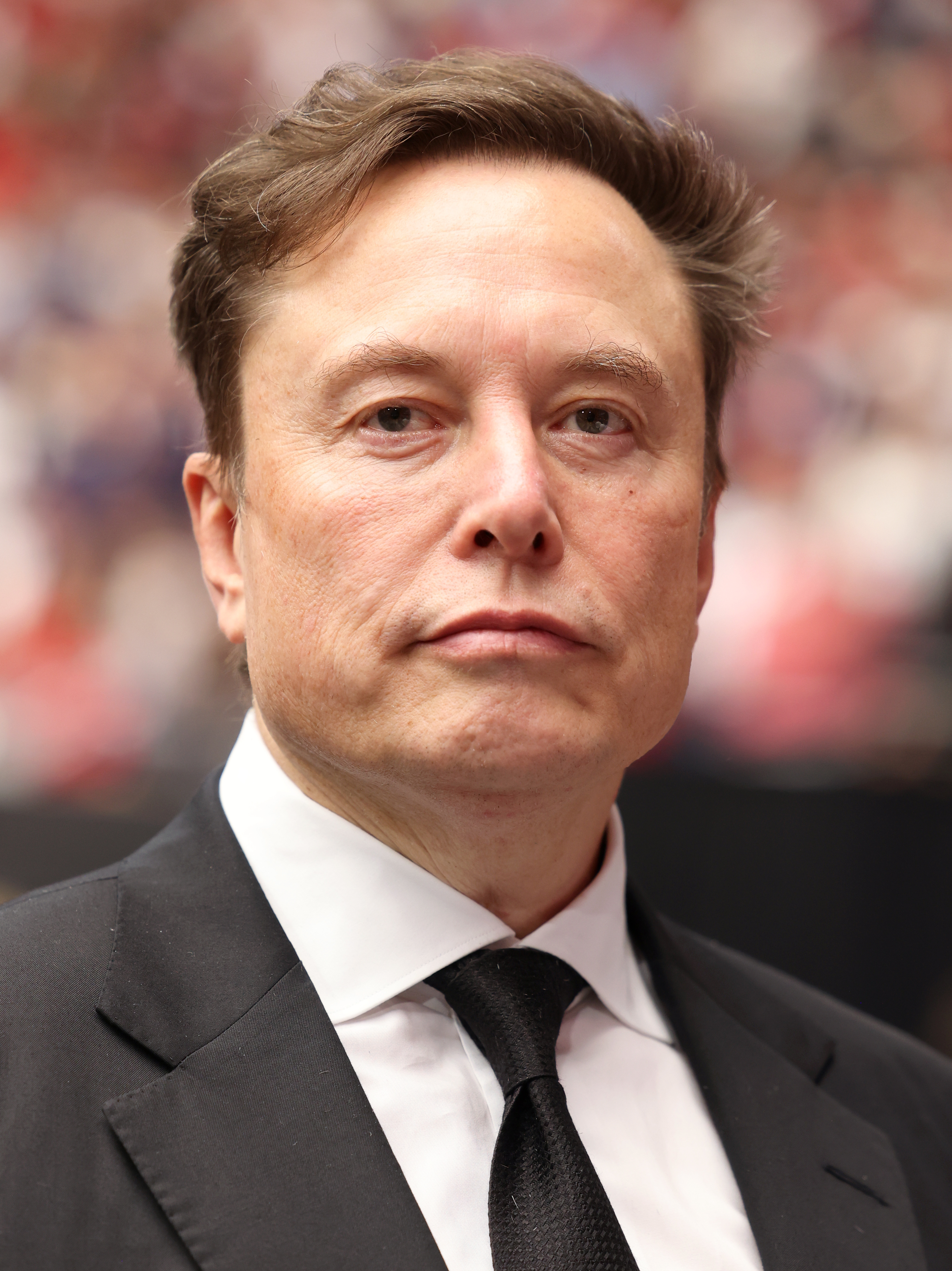
Elon Musk

Elon Musk is the world's first trillionaire. He and Epstein coordinated a possible holiday visit to Epstein's U.S. Virgin Islands compound in 2013-14. In 2012, Musk asked Epstein about his then-wife Talulah Riley and him attending "the wildest party" on his island. Musk also invited Epstein to talk with him at SpaceX near Long Beach, California. In an email to Tom Pritzker, Epstein described a dinner with Musk as "wild". Musk stated he declined Epstein's invitations to his island.

=== Kimbal Musk ===
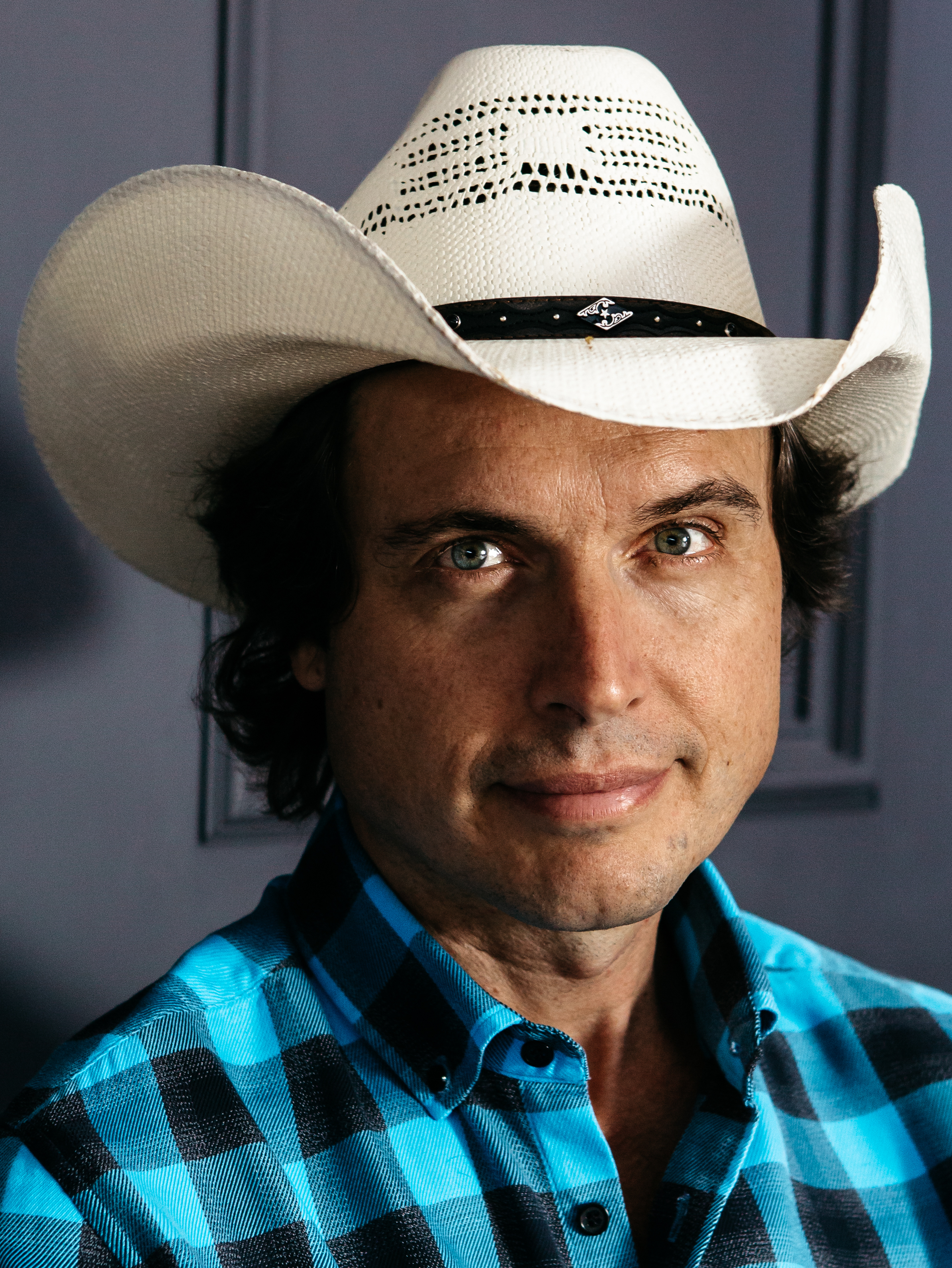
Kimbal Musk

Kimbal Musk is a businessman referenced more than 140 times in emails exchanged between Epstein, his associates, and his brother Elon. Kimbal began socializing with Epstein in 2012. Emails revealed that Epstein engineered an intimate relationship between Kimbal and a young woman with the help of Boris Nikolic; Kimbal thanked them for connecting with the woman; they dated for six months in 2012 and 2013. Facing criticism over his Epstein tie, Kimbal resigned from the Burning Man Project.

=== Nathan Myhrvold ===
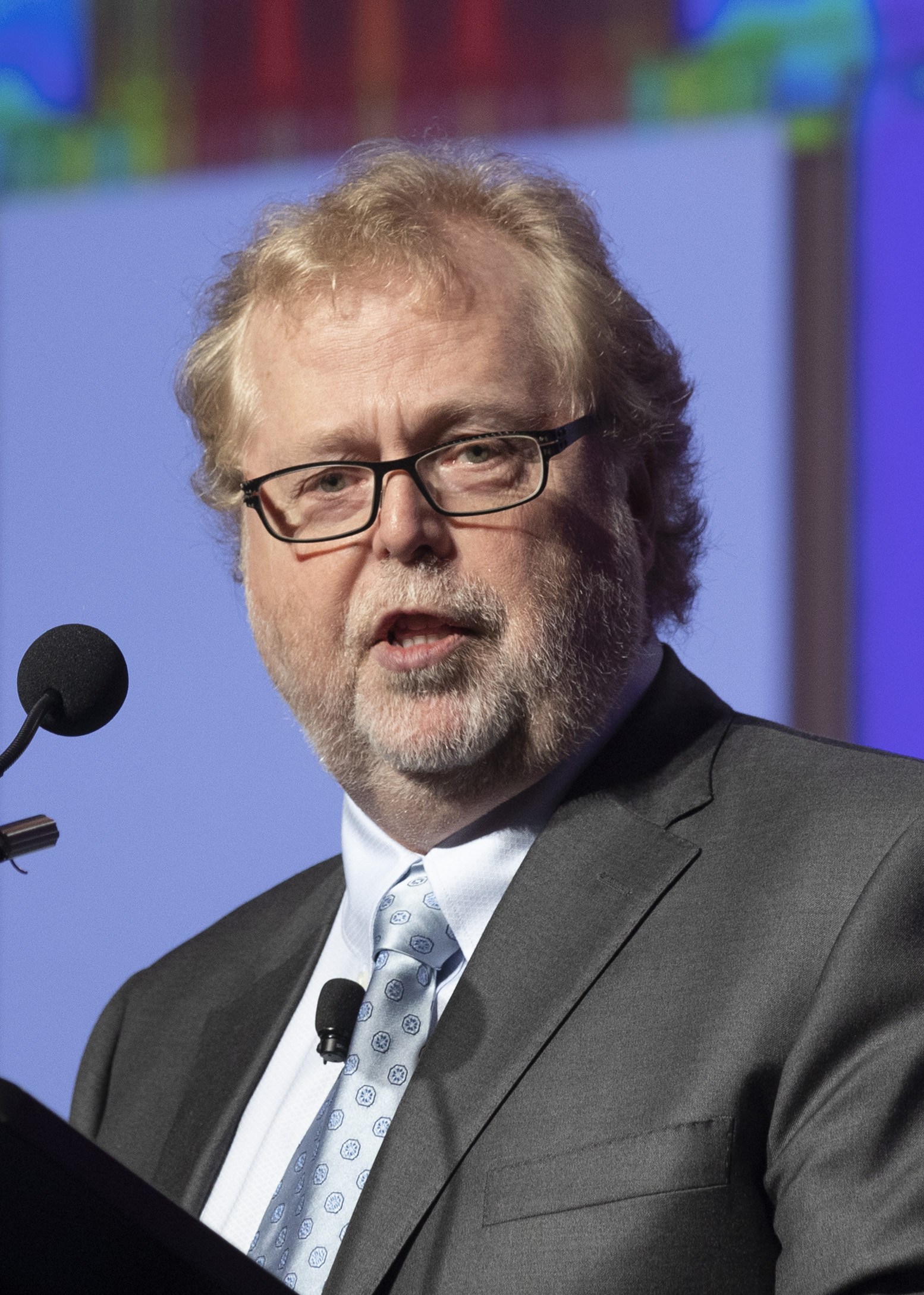
Nathan Myhrvold

Nathan Myhrvold is an American inventor, scientist, and businessman, who was formerly chief technology officer at Microsoft. Epstein and Myhrvold frequently emailed each other and regularly met, both in Seattle and New York City, from at least 2010 to 2018. Myhrvold invited Epstein to visit his investment company Intellectual Ventures in 2014; an email shows Myhrvold urging Epstein to bring a named female acquaintance. Other emails indicate that Myhrvold visited Epstein's compound in the US Virgin Islands in 2011. Furthermore, Myhrvold contributed what was described as "several sexually explicit wildlife photos" to Epstein's 50th birthday book in 2003.

== N ==
=== Annabelle Neilson ===
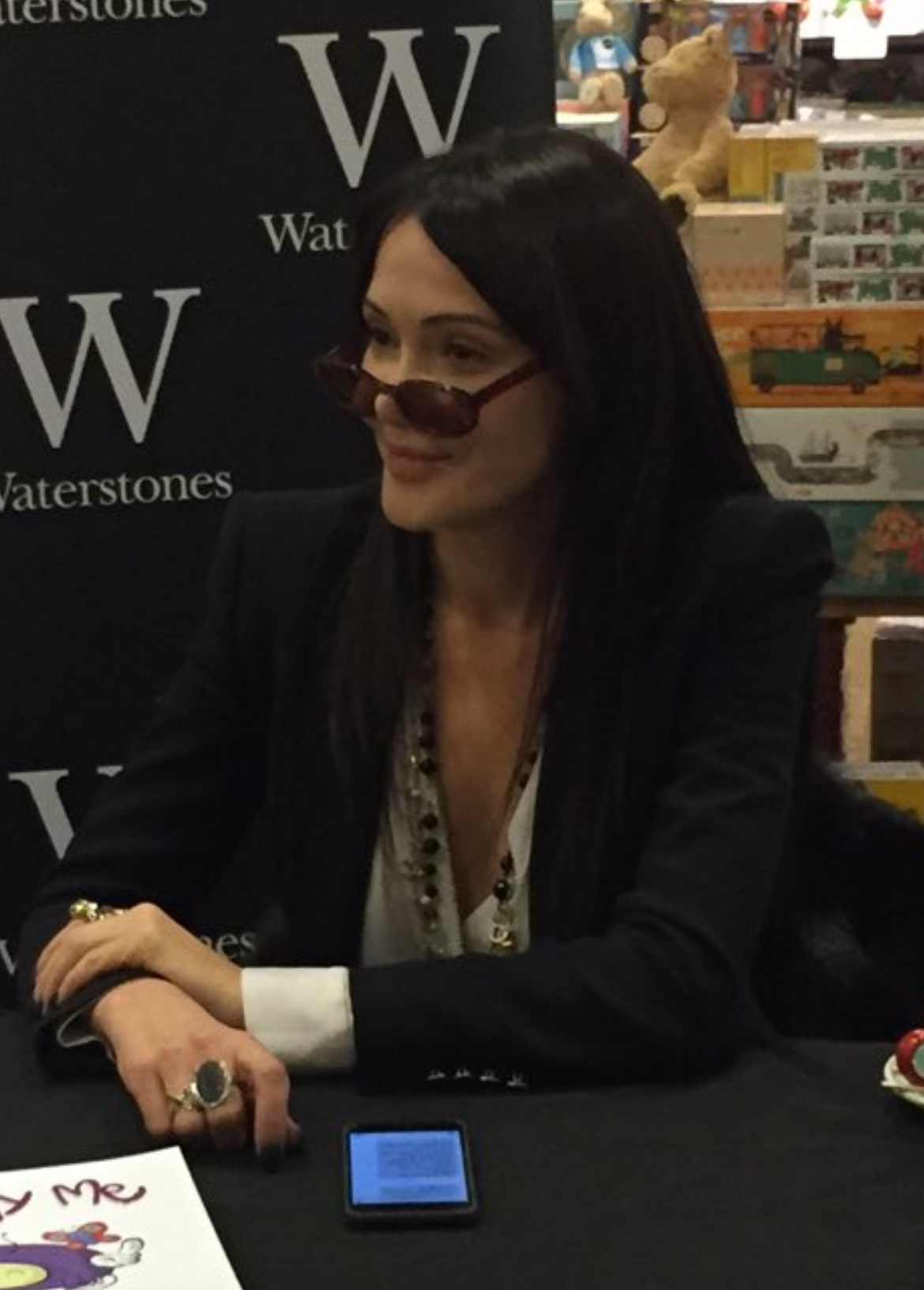
Annabelle Neilson

Annabelle Neilson was a British model and socialite. Neilson was identified as having emailed Epstein numerous times between 2010 and 2012, Neilson agreed to "put together a group of girls" for Epstein and noted that some were "unfortunately past their sell-by date".

=== Elisa New ===
Elisa New is a former professor at Harvard University. In 2015, New wrote to Epstein to thank him for a donation he had arranged. A 2020 Harvard review found that one of Epstein's foundations claimed on tax forms in 2016 that it had donated $110,000 to a nonprofit organization of which New was president. In November 2025, New issued an apology. The next month, Arizona State University cut ties with New and PBS dropped her show, Poetry in America.

=== Boris Nikolic ===
Boris Nikolic is a Croatian doctor, biotech investor, and former adviser to the Bill and Melinda Gates Foundation. Epstein named him the backup executor of his estate; Nikolic said he did not consent. In January 2010, Nikolic told Epstein that he met Nicolas Sarkozy, and two persons he described as Epstein's friends: Bill Clinton, Prince Andrew; Nikolic mentioned having flirted a 22-year-old woman but, after noticing she was with her husband, concluded that "anything good is rented". In October 2011, Epstein enjoined Nikolic to meet Christopher Poole.

=== Martin Nowak ===
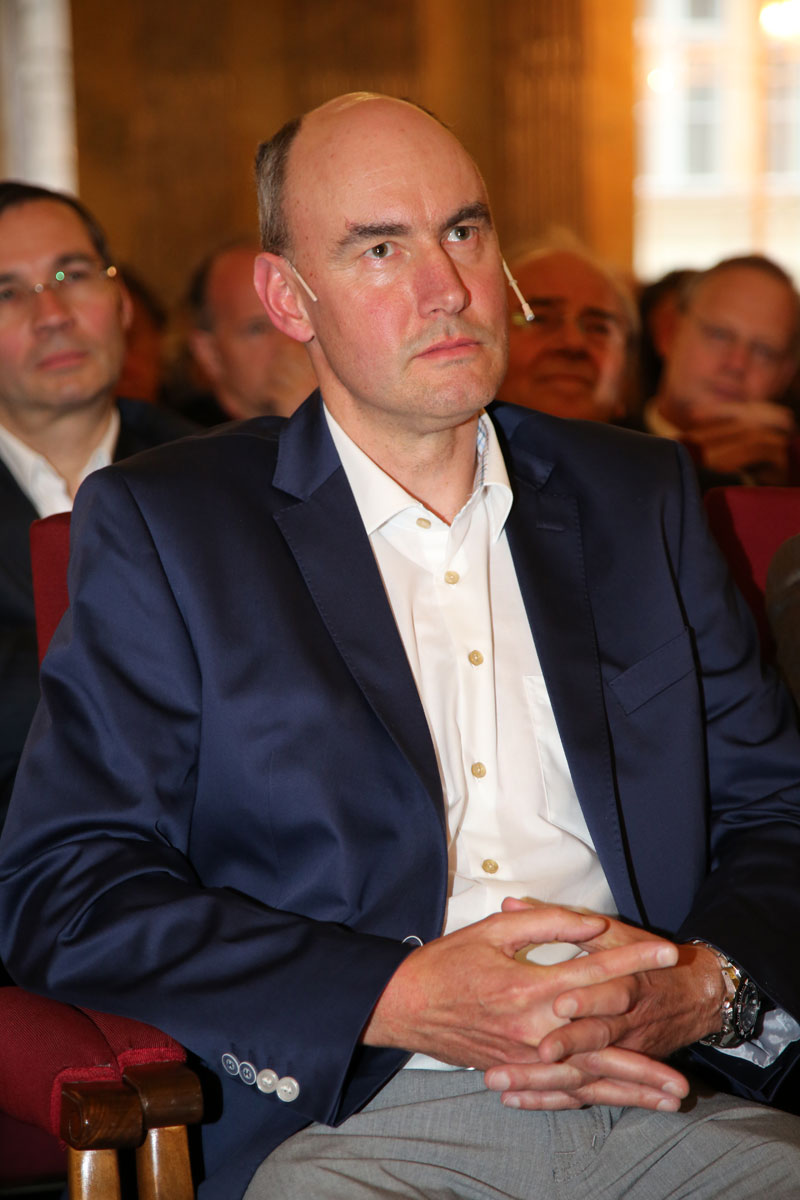
Martin Nowak

Martin Nowak teaches mathematics and biology at Harvard University. In 2003, Epstein donated $6.5 million to establish Harvard's Program for Evolutionary Dynamics, which Nowak led. Epstein visited Harvard approximately 40 times after his release from jail in 2009, according to a university review. After publishing a report on its financial ties to Epstein in 2020, Harvard placed Nowak under sanctions for two years and shuttered the Program for Evolutionary Dynamics.

== P ==
=== Andrés Pastrana Arango ===
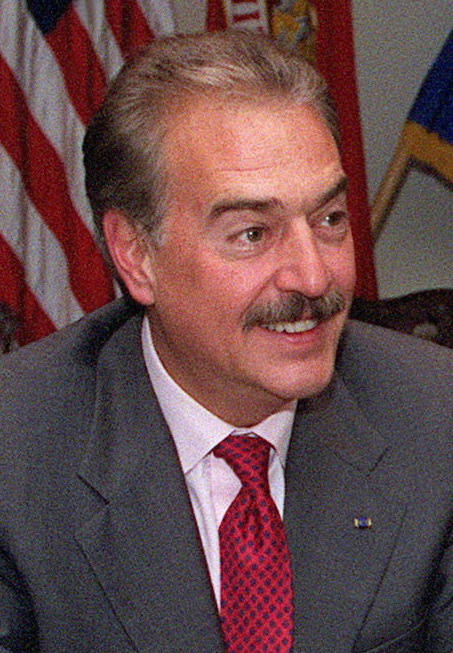
Andrés Pastrana Arango

Andrés Pastrana Arango was President of Colombia from 1998 to 2002. According to flight logs from Epstein's private jet, Pastrana was present on a flight from Carabobo, Venezuela, to Nassau, the Bahamas, in 2003. Upon the release of the logs in 2019, Pastrana admitted to having flown with Epstein to the Bahamas for a stop-over, claiming their final destination was Havana, Cuba, at the invitation of Fidel Castro. A photograph showed Pastrana and Ghislaine Maxwell wearing Colombian Aerospace Force uniforms.

=== Brock Pierce ===
Brock Pierce is an American businessman and co-founder of the cryptocurrency Tether. Pierce and Epstein first met at a conference held on Little Saint James in 2011. In March 2012, Pierce emailed Epstein that he "had a great time with the girls" and in May 2012, Epstein offered to arrange a meeting between Pierce and "my new Russian". While Pierce was on a trip to Moscow, Kyiv, and Odessa in 2012, Epstein asked him to "take photos and find me a present". Pierce sent Epstein dozens of photographs of a Ukrainian woman named Anastasia. Pierce and Epstein also corresponded about bitcoin and other cryptocurrency.

=== Jean Pigozzi ===
Jean Pigozzi is a French-born Italian art collector and philanthropist who inherited his fortune from his father Henri. Pigozzi and Epstein had a substantial correspondence. In a 2013 exchange, Pigozzi told Epstein he liked "the red head". Pigozzi said he did not remember that discussion and that he regretted meeting Epstein.

=== Steven Pinker ===
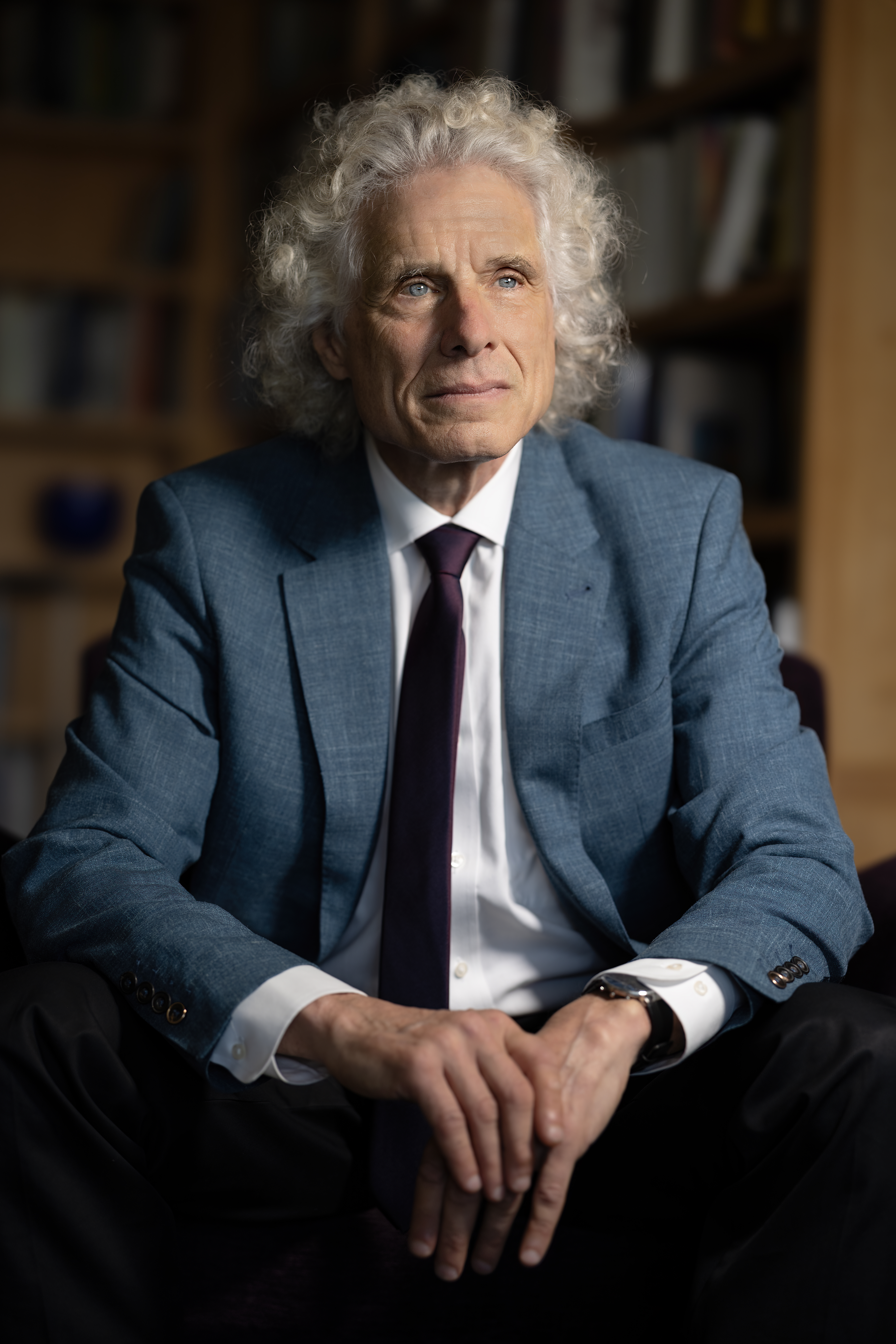
Steven Pinker

Steven Pinker is a Canadian-American Harvard University professor of psychology and a public intellectual involved in the American culture wars. He has intersected with Epstein through Brockman, Dershowitz, Kosslyn, Krauss, and Nowak. He also helped Epstein with his legal defense. Video footage from the December 2025 files release has shown four seconds of Pinker riding with Epstein on his plane.

=== Alberto Pinto and Linda Pinto ===
Alberto Pinto and Linda Pinto created a famous design group in Paris. They worked on the Herbert N. Straus House when Wexner owned it; Epstein hired to design some of his other properties. Epstein and the Pintos also were friends, sharing birthday greetings and dinners, including a dinner with Maxwell and Giuffre. Epstein paid them millions of dollars over the years, and introduced them to other wealthy potential clients.

=== John Phelan ===
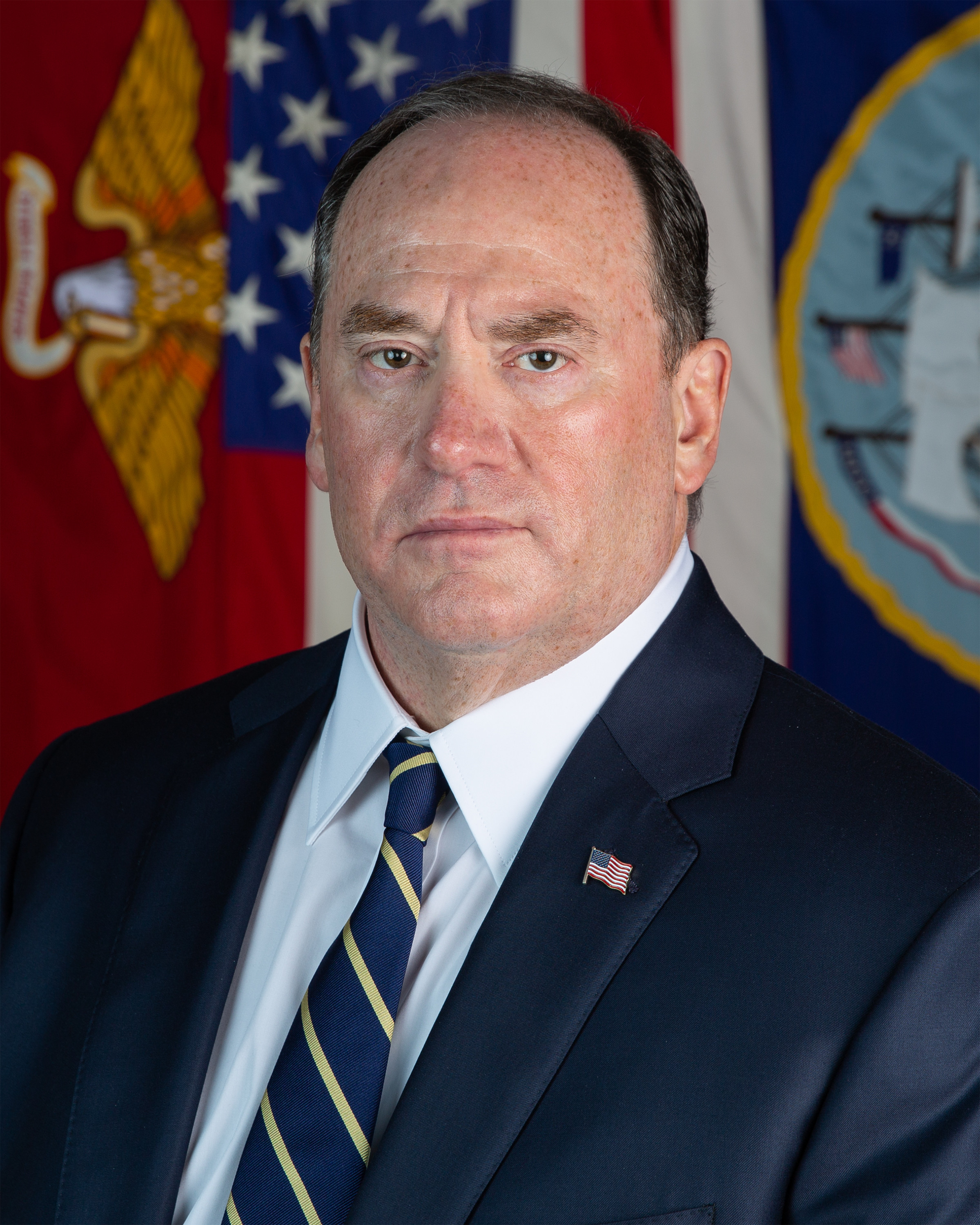
John Phelan

John Phelan is an American businessman who formerly served as United States Secretary of the Navy. His name is present in a flight manifest from Jeffrey Epstein's private airplane in 2006. Also on the flight manifest was Jean-Luc Brunel and six names redacted in the October 2025 release.

=== Stacey Plaskett ===
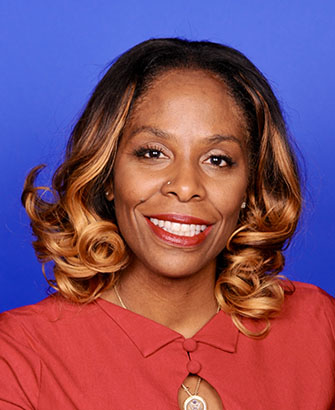
Stacey Plaskett

Stacey Plaskett is the U.S. Virgin Islands representative. Timestamps and contents of text messages revealed an exchange between Epstein and Plaskett during a February 2019 House Oversight Committee hearing in which Michael Cohen testified against Trump. Epstein noted that Cohen had mentioned Trump's executive assistant Rhona Graff; Plaskett asked Cohen about Graff during her questioning. Plaskett tried to normalize the exchange and emphasized her record against sexual crimes.

=== Christopher Poole ===
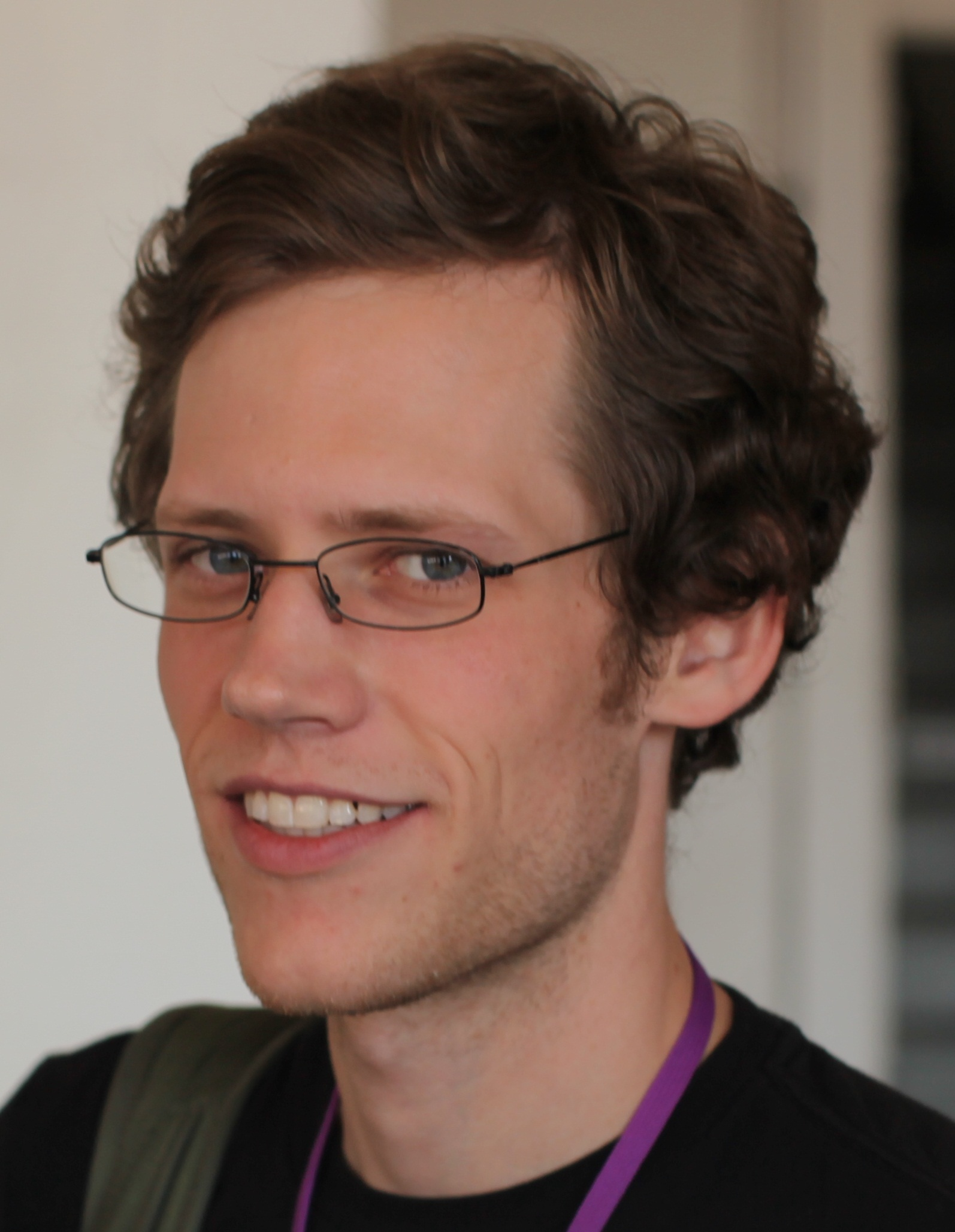
Christopher Poole

Christopher Poole (a.k.a. "moot") is an American Internet entrepreneur and founder of 4chan. In October 2011, Epstein met Poole. Epstein later wrote to the person who introduced that he liked him, and found him "very bright". Poole denied that Epstein had any involvement with the creation of /pol/.

=== Soon-Yi Previn ===
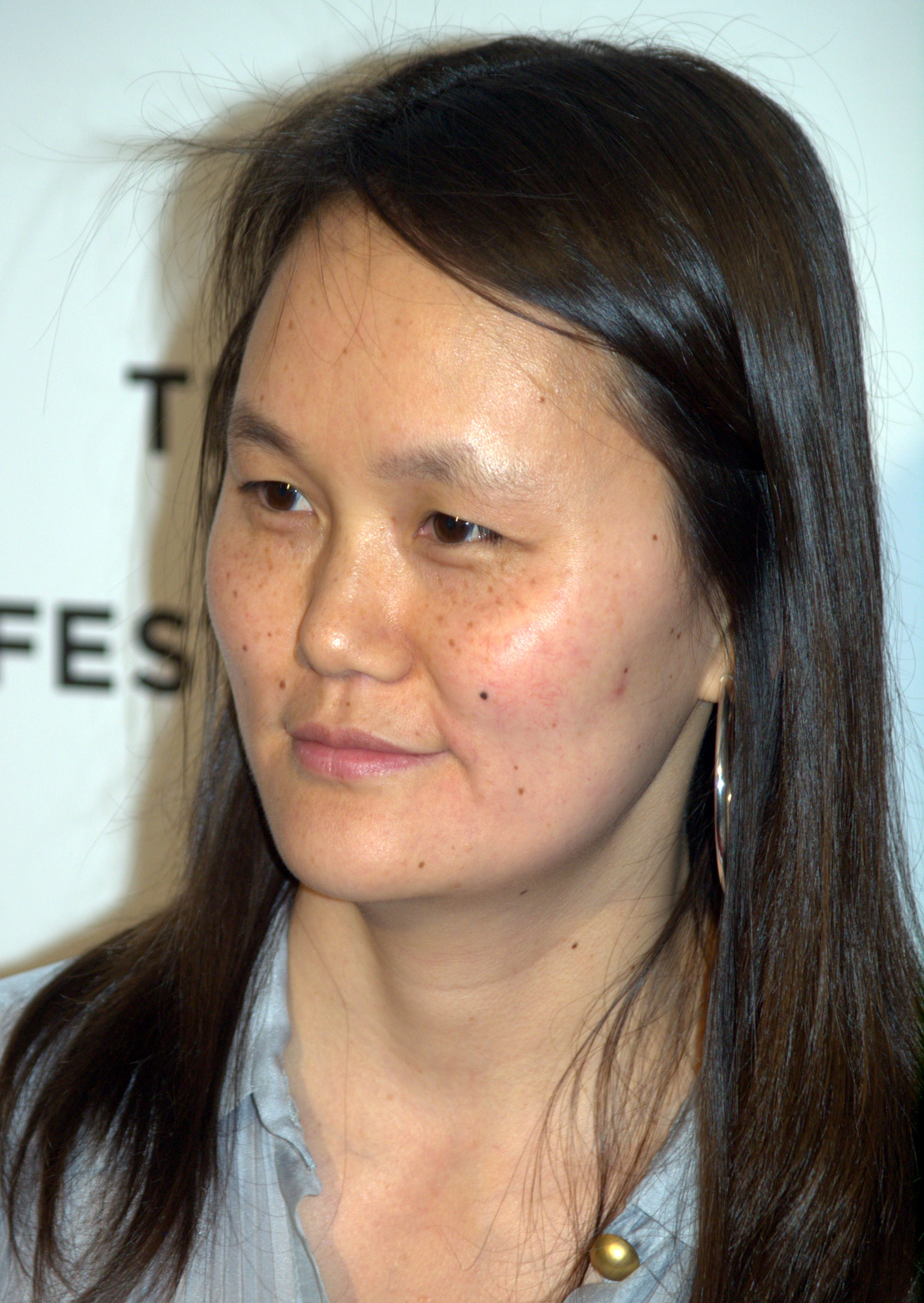
Soon-Yi Previn

Soon-Yi Previn is Woody Allen's wife. She maintained email correspondence with Epstein. She repeatedly said that the MeToo movement had "gone too far"; she also described a 15-year-old victim of Anthony Weiner as "despicable and disgusting", and she blamed the victim. Emails showed that Epstein helped Allen and Previn's daughter get into Bard College by connecting her to the school's president, a longtime acquaintance.

=== Thomas Pritzker ===
Thomas Pritzker is an American billionaire businessman. Pritzker originally downplayed his contact with Epstein, but the release of the Epstein files revealed continuous plans and exchanges, including one email in which he helps Karyna Shuliak arrange a trip to Southeast Asia to "find a new girlfriend for Epstein." In February 2026, Pritzker stepped down from his position as executive chairman of Hyatt Hotels, and would concentrate on a science foundation he began. In December 2000, Epstein, Maxwell, Pritzker, and others, including an unnamed 'female', landed at Royal Air Force station, RAF Marham, reportedly for a two-day shooting party at Sandringham.

=== Mariya Prusakova ===
Mariya "Masha" Prusakova is a Russian snowboarder. Epstein and Prusakova first met in 2011. She helped Epstein recruit women, stating in a 2013 email: "Sometimes I think that I am your Paris based Ghislaine Maxwell." Epstein financed some of Prusakova's law studies at a university in Paris and at UC Berkeley from 2016 to 2019.

=== Hardeep Singh Puri ===
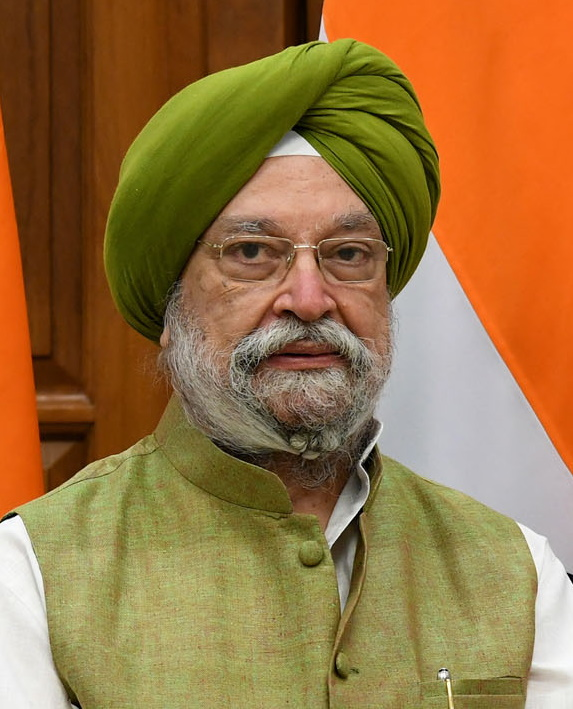
Hardeep Singh Puri

Hardeep Singh Puri is an Indian politician and, since 2021, the Union Minister of Petroleum and Natural Gas. In the January 2026 releases, email exchanges related to business networking and investment discussions between Puri and Epstein were found. Puri did not deny emailing Epstein and acknowledged meeting Epstein three or four times, saying these encounters were professional and took place as part of delegations during his time at the International Peace Institute. In October 2026, several photographs from the January release circulated widely online, showing Puri and Epstein, with no one else in the frame.

== R ==
=== V. S. Ramachandran ===
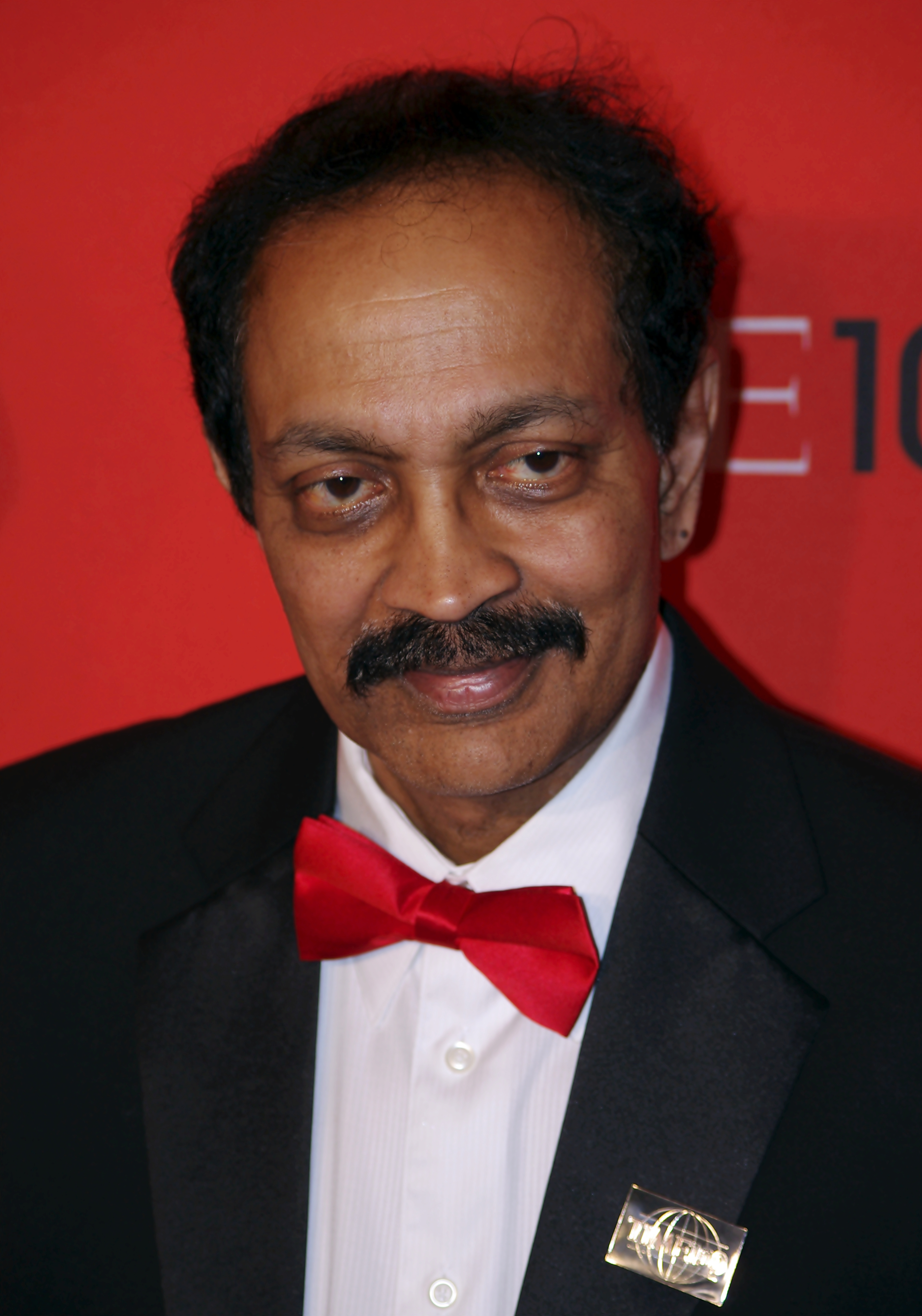
V.S. Ramachandran

V. S. Ramachandran (also known as Vilayanur S. Ramachandran) is a director of University of California, San Diego's psychology department. In 2017, Deepak Chopra introduced Epstein to Ramachandran whose lab was conducting a study on an "autistic savant who displays telepathy". Ramachandran wrote that he had no problems accepting funding from Epstein, and desired $500,000 to $3 million. After lab visits, Epstein sent him $25,000.

=== Joshua Cooper Ramo ===
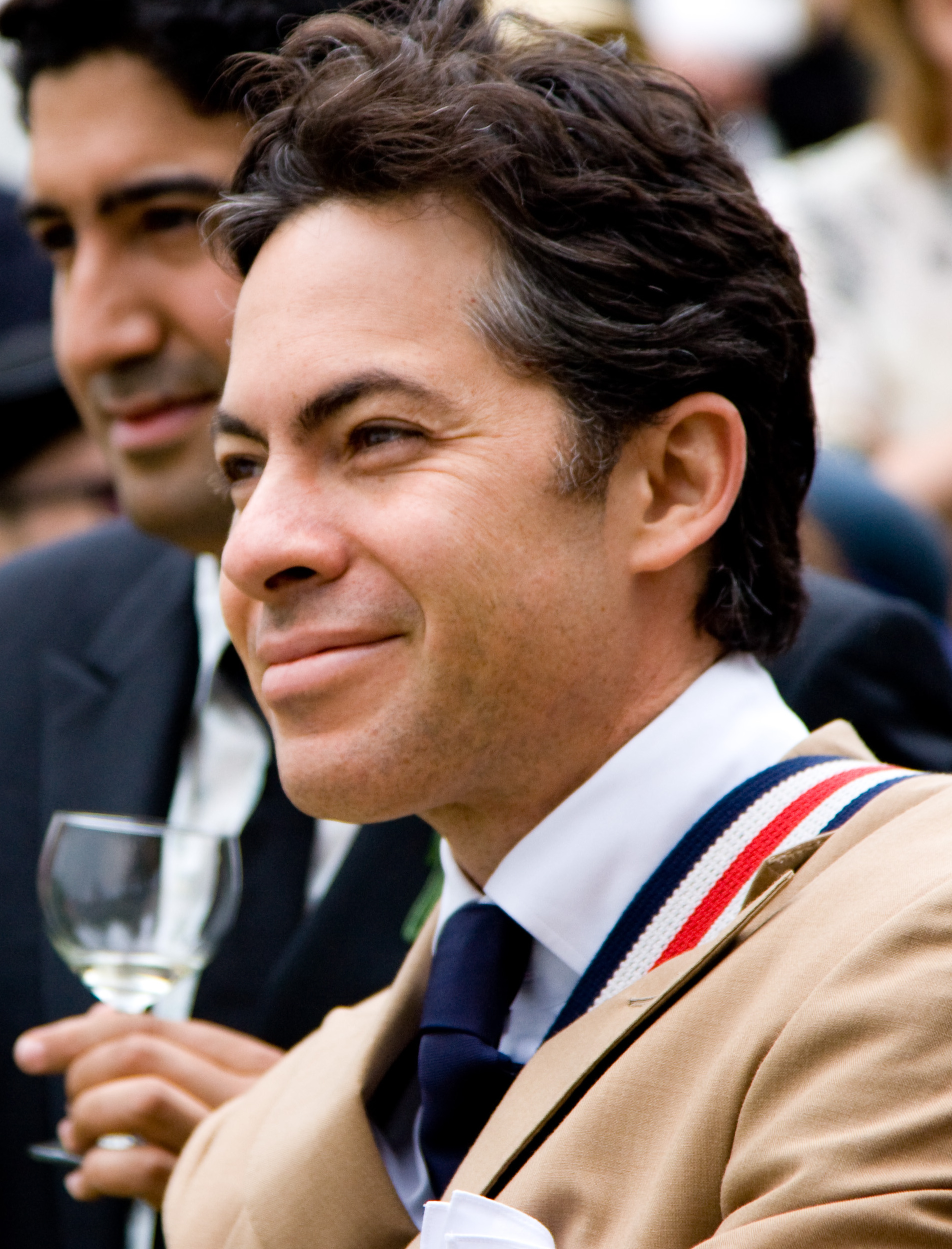
Joshua Cooper Ramo

Joshua Cooper Ramo is an American foreign policy consultant and co-chief executive of Kissinger Associates. Scheduling documents showed the then co-CEO of Henry Kissinger's corporate consulting firm had more than a dozen meetings with Epstein from 2013 to 2017, many in the evenings at Epstein's Manhattan townhouse. Ramo was invited to a breakfast at the townhouse in September 2013 with former Israeli prime minister Ehud Barak. At the time, Ramo served on the boards of Starbucks and FedEx.

=== Lisa Randall ===
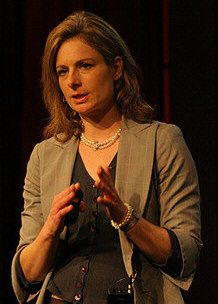
Lisa Randall

Lisa Randall is a professor of physics at Harvard University who met with Epstein several times, including to his Caribbean island in 2014. They exchanged hundreds of messages. Randall claimed she was introduced to Epstein by her then-literary agent John Brockman in 2004; when Randall was considering leaving Harvard in 2009, Brockman emailed a number of people, including Epstein, seeking advice.

=== Brett Ratner ===
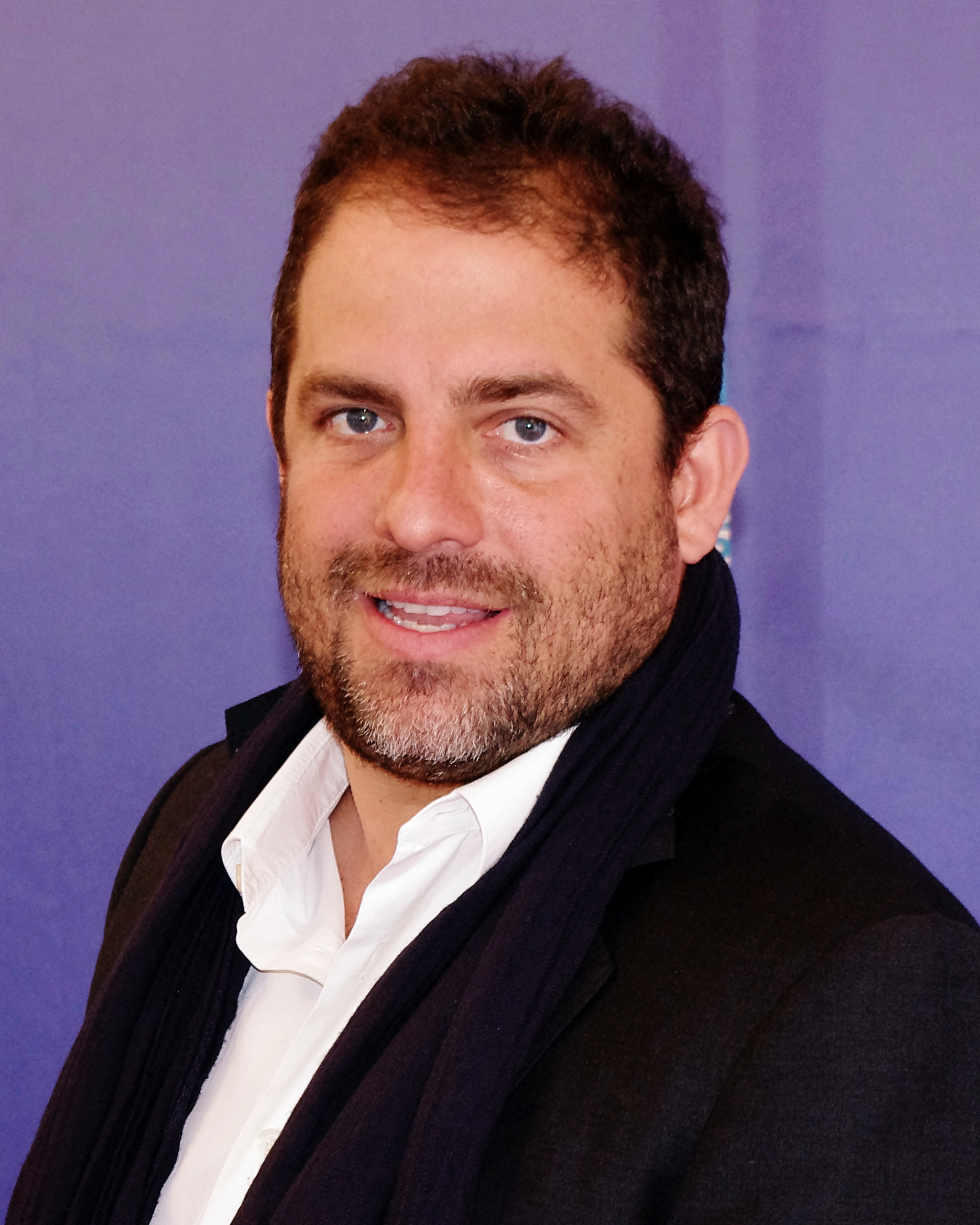
Brett Ratner

Brett Ratner is a film director and producer who appeared in undated photographs with Epstein and Jean-Luc Brunel. Additional images showed Ratner seated on a sofa beside Epstein and two women whose identities were obscured; a series of thumbnails showed Ratner, Epstein, and Brunel with different women.

=== Bill Richardson ===
Bill Richardson was a former governor of New Mexico. Records show that Richardson arranged to meet with Epstein at least nine times after 2006, when he publicly distanced himself from him. They also arranged to chat over the phone multiple times, according to the Santa Fe New Mexican. In 2002, Richardson denied having been on Little St. James; records indicate he went in 2010.

=== Terje Rød-Larsen ===
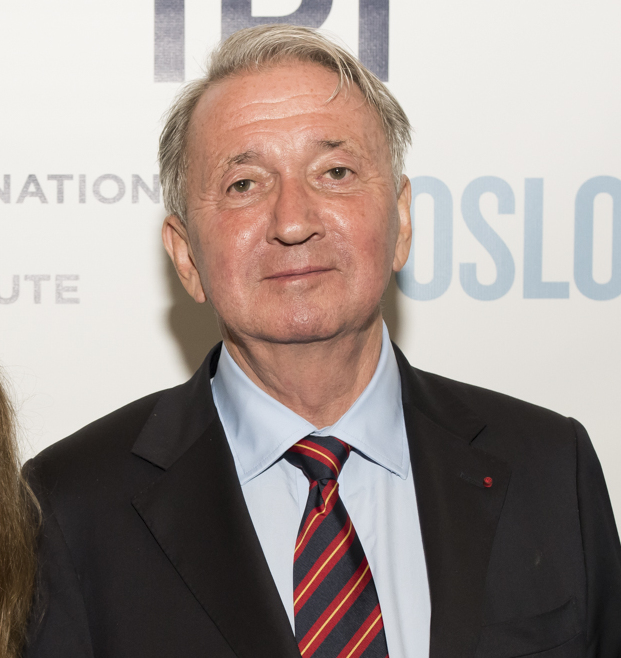
Terje Rød-Larsen

Terje Rød-Larsen is a Norwegian former diplomat, politician, and sociologist. The Epstein files indicated that each of Terje Rød-Larsen's children were to be given $5 million in Epstein's will. In a statement, Rød-Larsen's wife Mona Juul said that the family had not been aware of the contents of the will before the document release, and declined to comment further. Within the files, Rød-Larsen described Epstein as "my best friend" and "a thoroughly good human being". Larsen had introduced Epstein to Jean Todt.

=== David A. Ross ===
David A. Ross is an art curator. His relationship with Epstein went back as far as the 1990s, when Ross was a director at the Whitney Museum of Art. After Epstein left jail in 2009, Ross emailed him, celebrating his release from an "undeserved punishment foisted upon you by jealous creeps". A few months later, Epstein offered to fund an exhibition titled Statutory; Ross responded: "You are incredible!" In 2015, Ross told Epstein he was "still proud" to call him a friend despite the ongoing revelations. After the files release, Ross stated befriending wealthy patrons was part of his job. Ross left his chair at the School of Visual Arts.

=== Ariane de Rothschild ===
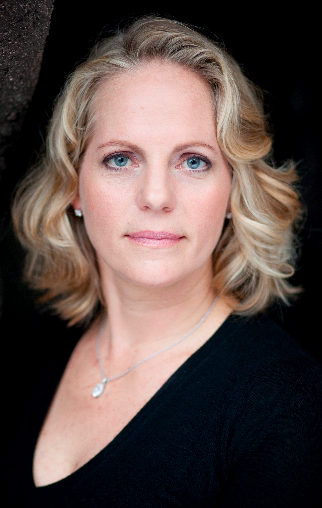
Ariane de Rothschild

Ariane de Rothschild is a French banker and CEO of Edmond de Rothschild Group.

Scheduling documents indicate de Rothschild had more than a dozen meetings with Epstein from 2013 to 2019. She bought nearly $1 million worth of auction items on Epstein's behalf in 2014 and 2015, and in October 2015 negotiated a $25 million contract for Epstein's Southern Trust Co. to provide risk analysis services for the bank. In 2019, following Epstein's arrest, the bank initially stated that de Rothschild had never met Epstein and the bank had no business links with him; the bank later acknowledged to The Wall Street Journal that this statement was not accurate. The bank stated that de Rothschild had no knowledge of any legal proceedings against Epstein and "was similarly unaware of any questions regarding his personal conduct".

=== Lynn Forester de Rothschild ===
Lynn Forester de Rothschild is the chair of E.L. Rothschild. Epstein said that he had given her financial help in the 1990s during her divorce from her second husband Andrew Stein, but a spokesperson for de Rothschild said that this claim was "one hundred percent false". Epstein's lawyer, Alan Dershowitz, claimed he was introduced to Epstein by de Rothschild, who referred to him as an "interesting autodidact" who he would enjoy getting to know. According to Ghislaine Maxwell, de Rothschild introduced Prince Andrew to Epstein. Peter Mandelson was introduced to Epstein at de Rothschild's house on Martha's Vineyard.

=== Nouriel Roubini ===
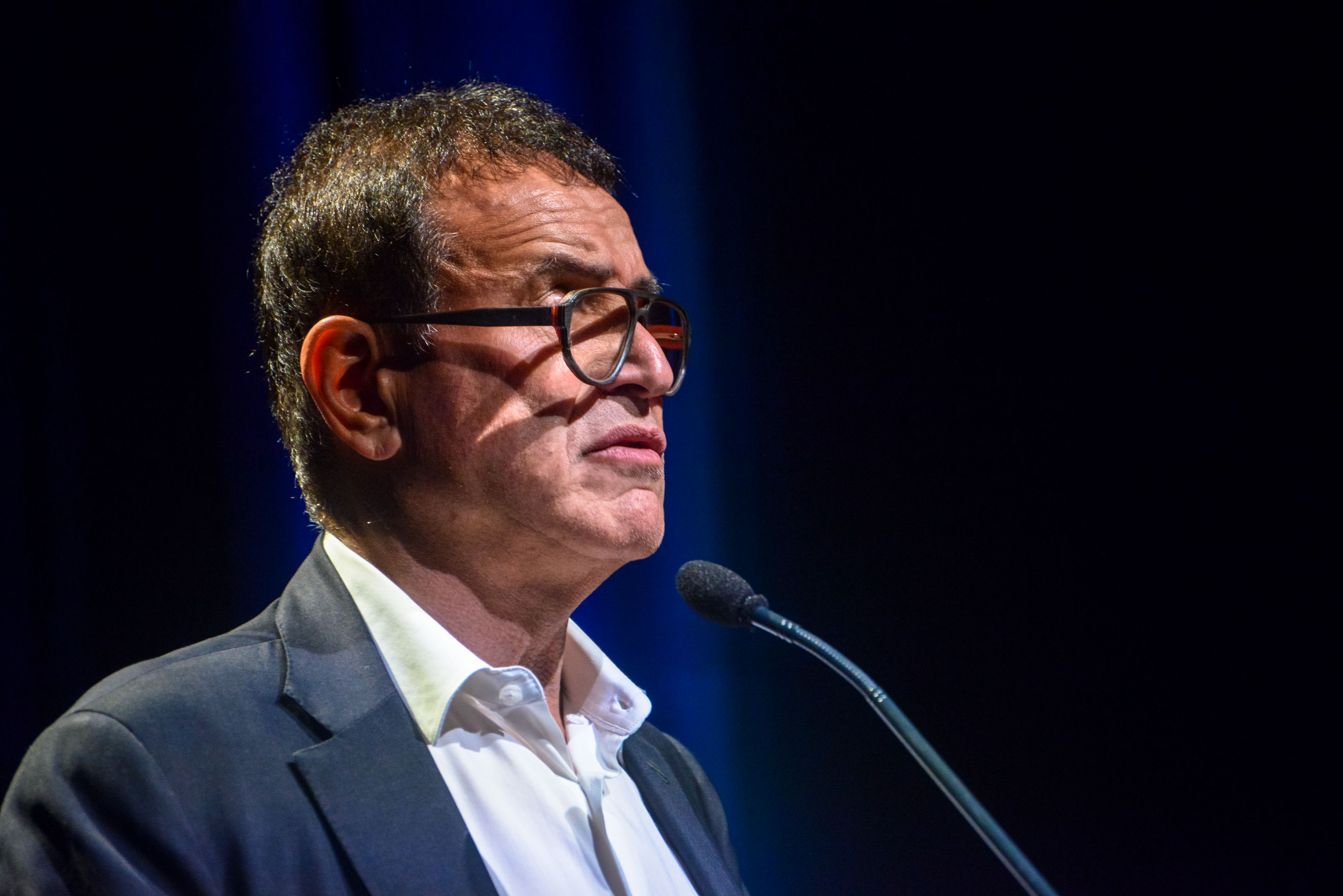
Nouriel Roubini

Nouriel Roubini is an economic consultant, economist, speaker, writer, and professor. Gino Yu, an academic, introduced Roubini to Epstein in 2018 by email. Roubini and Epstein met later that year.

=== Marc Rowan ===
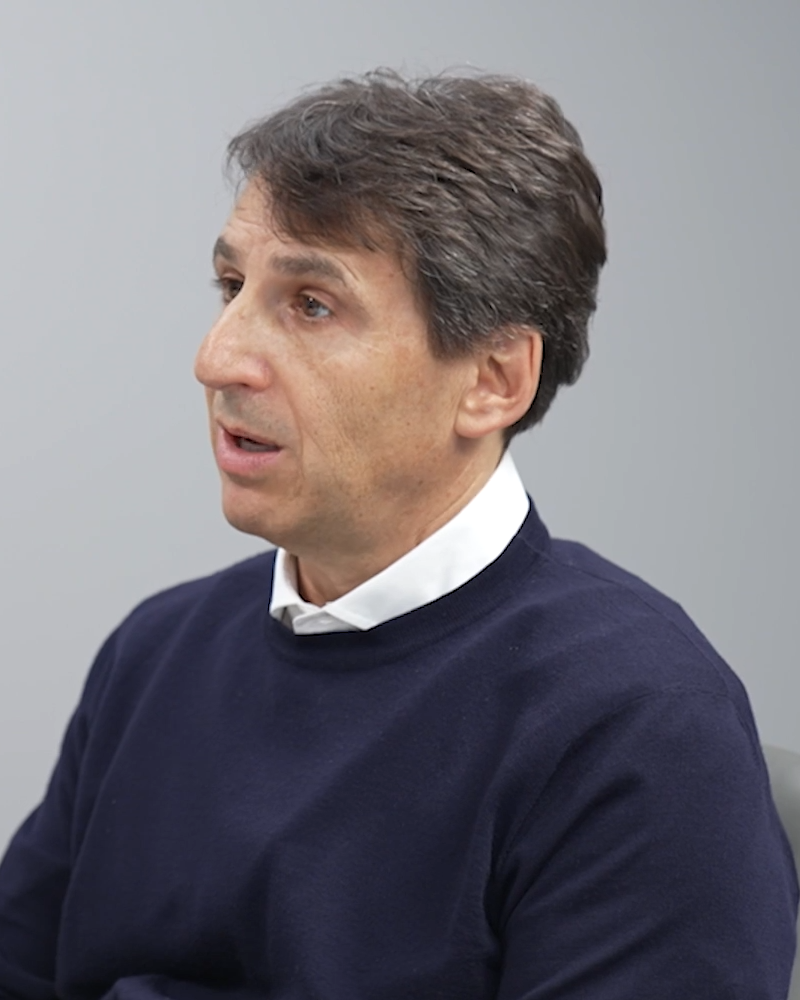
Marc Rowan

Marc Rowan is the Apollo Global Management CEO. He corresponded with Epstein over the firm's tax arrangements throughout the 2010s. In 2015, an Apollo partner emailed Epstein to catch up with discussions about a tax "inversion" scheme involving domiciling Apollo overseas. In 2016, Rowan forwarded Epstein a detailed internal calculation regarding Apollo's tax receivable agreement. Rowan and another Apollo executive met people from Edmond de Rothschild Group at Epstein's Manhattan townhouse in early 2016. Apollo denied doing business with Epstein.

=== Kevin Rudd ===
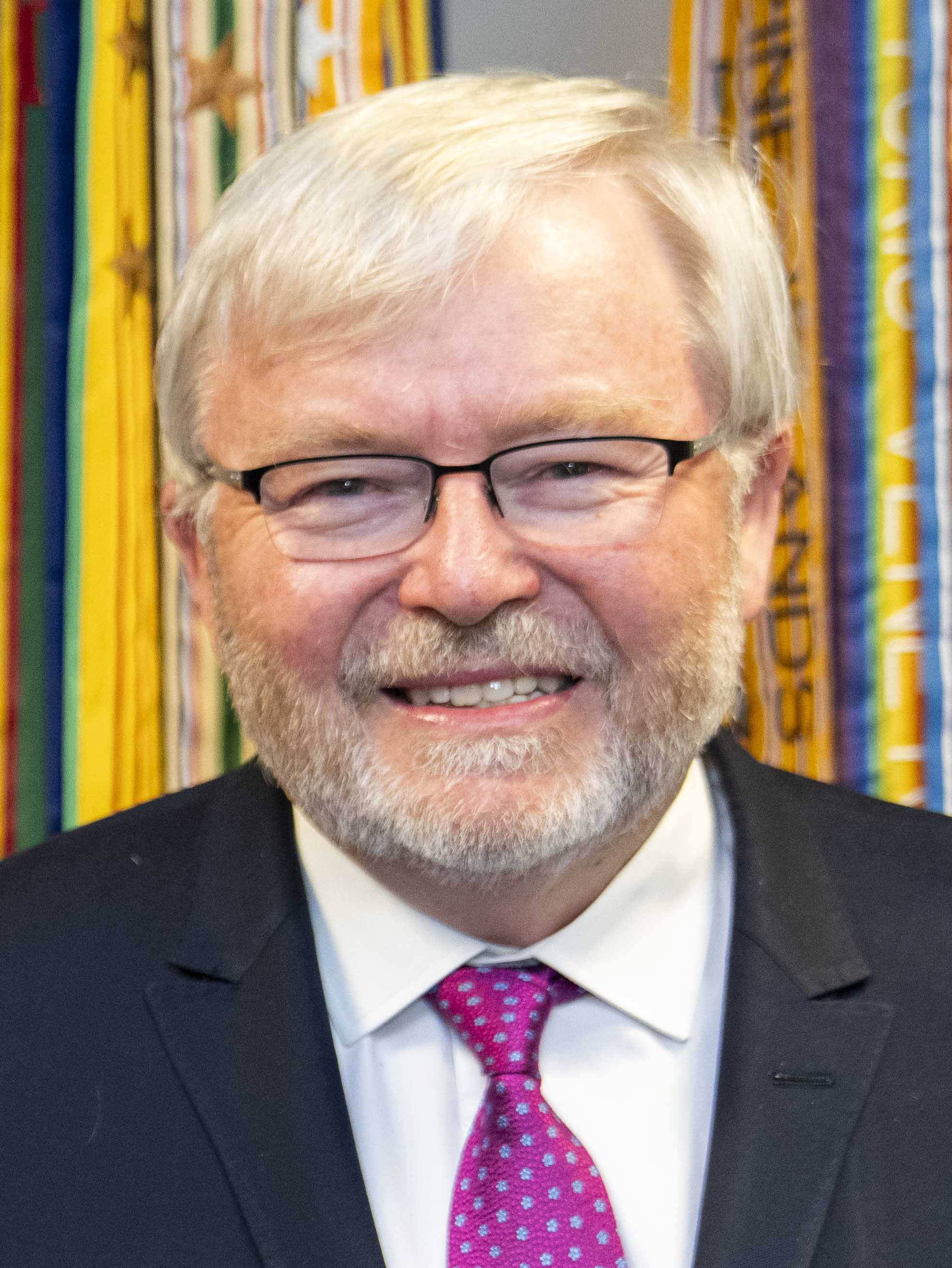
Kevin Rudd

Kevin Rudd was prime minister of Australia, and since 2023 is Australia's ambassador to the US. Documents released in 2026 show a meeting between Rudd and Epstein in 2015. Rudd clarified it was for the International Peace Institute, a think tank to which Epstein donated. Rudd denied having met or corresponded with Epstein.

=== Kathryn Ruemmler ===
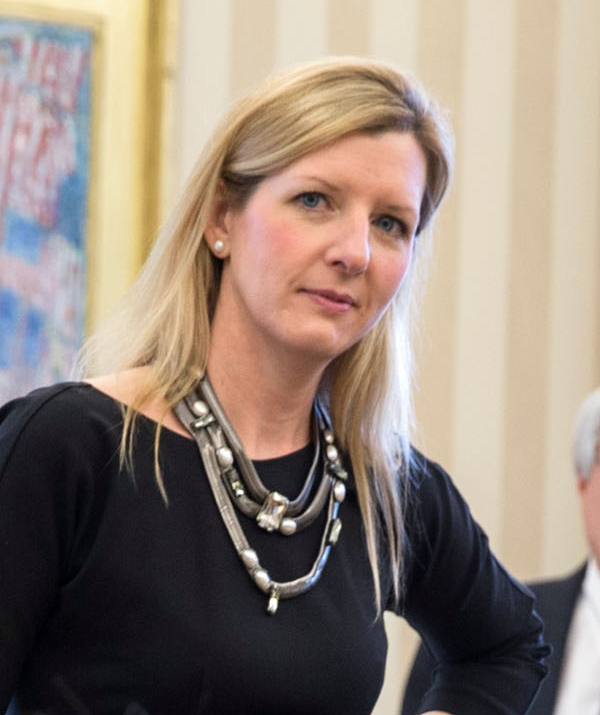
Kathryn Ruemmler

Kathryn Ruemmler is a former White House Counsel under Barack Obama, and as of 2026 general counsel of Goldman Sachs. The two were introduced in 2014 by Epstein's lawyer, Reid Weingarten. From then on documents Epstein sent gifts to Ruemmler. The two corresponded regularly. In 2015, Epstein asked her about the legalities of prostitution and consent for minors; she replied that they could not. In 2018, Epstein invited Ruemmler, Lajčák, and Bannon. When Epstein was arrested in July 2019, she was one of the three people he called. Ruemmler stated that her relationship with Epstein was professional, and expressed regret knowing him, and sympathy for his victims. She later resigned from Goldman Sachs, with four months notice.

== S ==
=== David Schoen ===
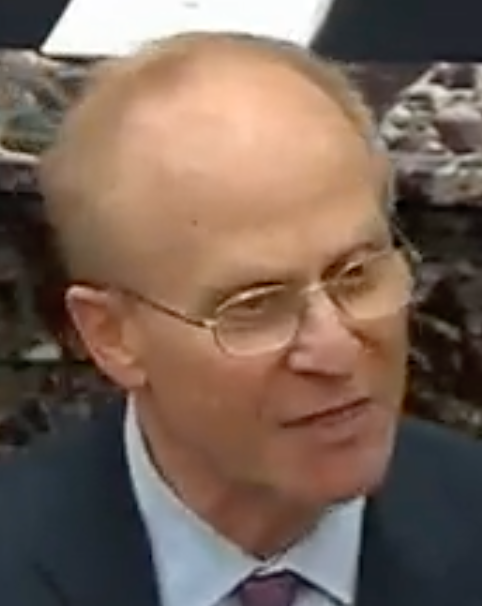
David Schoen

David Schoen is an American attorney who served as one of Donald Trump's impeachment defense lawyers. In 2011, Schoen wrote to Epstein: "These past couple of years you have to deal with horrible government agencies and folks who appear to be nothing less than extortionists posing as victims and that has to have been terrible." They continued to correspond until shortly before Epstein's death.

=== Al Seckel ===
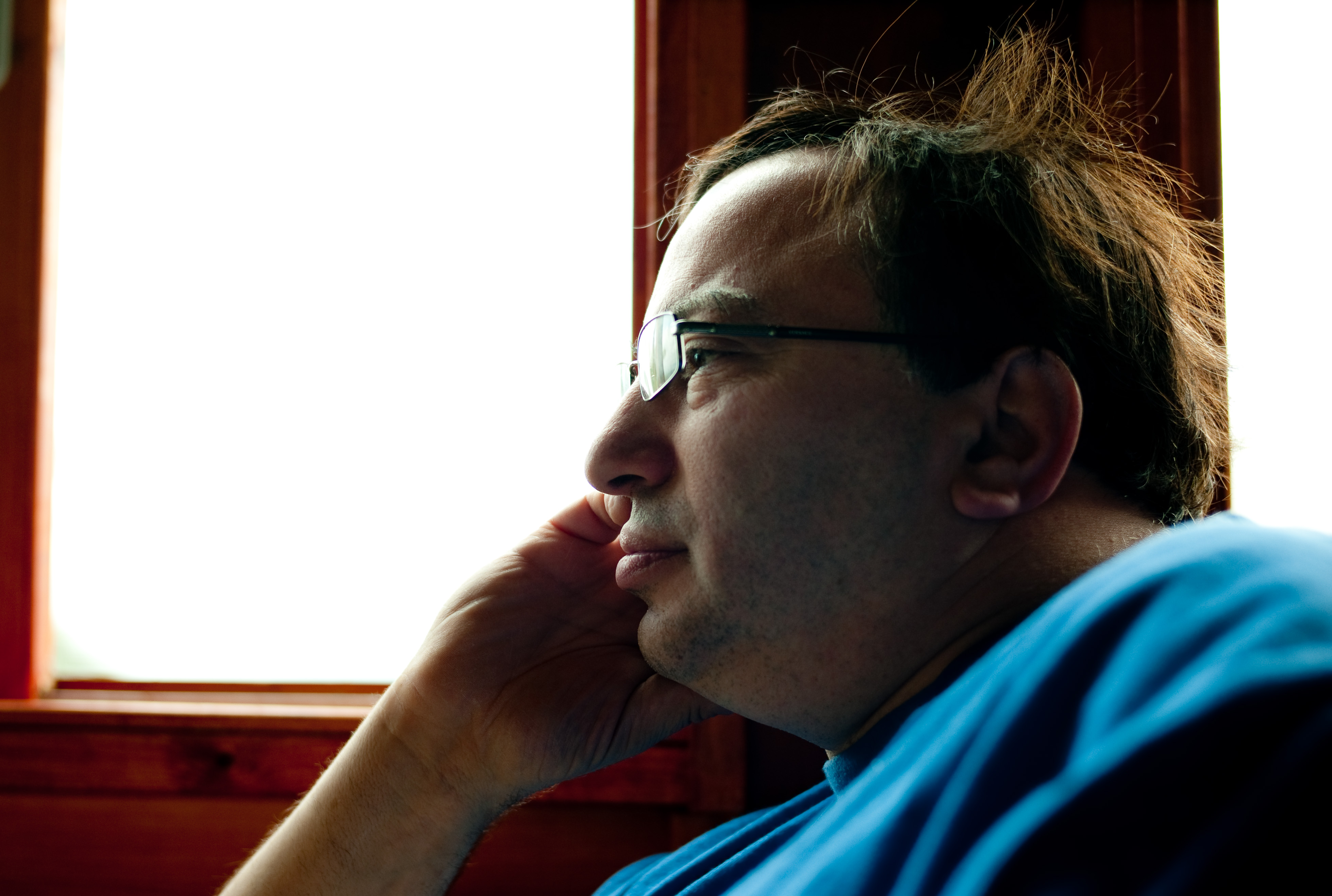
Al Seckel

Al Seckel (died 2015) was an American writer and skeptic married to Ghislaine Maxwell's sister, Isabel Maxwell. In 2010, Seckel discussed reputation management with Epstein. Seckel charged Epstein tens of thousands of US dollars for search engine optimization, including downranking stories about his conviction, removing "toxic suggested search engine terms", and making edits to Epstein's Wikipedia article to add content about Epstein's philanthropic work, to remove mentions of Epstein's crimes and his mug shot from the lead section, and to get users who added unwanted material banned. In 2010, Seckel emailed scientists he was acquainted with to link to websites Epstein that promoted his philanthropy in order to improve their SEO score and bump negative coverage from the search engine's first page. In July 2015, Seckel's body was reportedly found at the bottom of a cliff near his home in southern France. As of December 2021, his death remained unconfirmed by French authorities.

=== Roger Schank ===
Roger Schank (died 2023), was a Northwestern University Professor of computer science. Schank regularly defended Epstein publicly, asked him for the use of an apartment, and was twice offered access to "a girl" by Epstein. He and others in Epstein's circle repeatedly emailed each other deriding women's intelligence. Schank wrote "intelligence comes about in part from real focus" and that women are instead "first and foremost focused on what others are thinking and feeling about her." He wrote "Hard to be brilliant if you are worrying if you look fat or why another woman hates you or why you don't own a kelly bag [sic]."

=== Andres Serrano ===
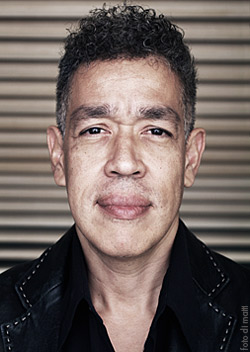
Andres Serrano

Andres Serrano is an American photographer and artist. Serrano photographed Epstein shortly before Epstein's death in 2019. In 2016, Serrano emailed Epstein that he was considering a "sympathy vote" for Trump because of outrage about the Donald Trump Access Hollywood tape.

=== Rony Shimony ===
Dr. Rony Shimony was Epstein's cardiologist and he also socialized with Epstein in his New York mansion. He and Eva Andersson Dubin helped Epstein investigate how to buy ambulances for his New Mexico and Little Saint James properties. More notably, Epstein connected Shimony with Thorbjørn Jagland and paid for his visit, and connected him with Leon Black.

=== Karyna Shuliak ===
Karyna Shuliak is a Belarus-born dentist and was Epstein's girlfriend. Epstein gave her a 32.73-carat diamond ring and planned to give her all of his homes and $100 million in the event of his death.

In February 2012, Shuliak was denied admission to Columbia University's dental school. In August 2012, Epstein donated $100,000 to the dental school and was in contact with school administrators about admitting her.

=== Daniel Siad ===
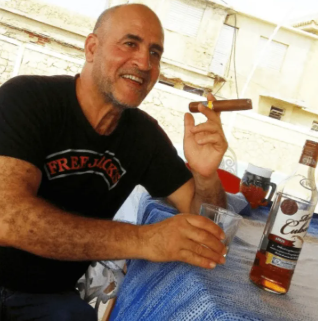
Daniel Siad

Daniel Siad was a Swedish modeling scout who worked on commission for Jean-Luc Brunel and regularly set up meetings between Epstein and teenaged aspiring models. In over 1,000 files with Siad's name, he discusses finding teens in Sweden, Slovakia, France, Russia, Spain, Morocco, and other places. Siad has stated that the meetings he set up between girls and Epstein were legitimate model castings. Some have come forward to say they were procured for Epstein for sexual purposes. In a 2014 email to Epstein, Siad compared his recruitment activities to fishing, writing, "In This busyness I feel like fisherman some time I cache quick, some time no fish".

=== Peggy Siegal ===
Peggy Siegal is an American entertainment publicist. She had corresponded with Epstein in 2009 during a trip to Kenya. In the email correspondence, she had offered to "bring a little baby back for you....or two". She also stated that she planned to pose for photographs in "mud huts" and pretend that she had "crashed the winter White House" and posed "with Obama's relatives".

=== Anastasiya Siroochenko ===
Siroochenko is an art advisor and collector who met Epstein in 2010, when she was 22 and working as a model with Brunel's agency. Epstein coordinated her financial affairs from 2011 to 2018. Between 2011 and 2015, Black transferred at least $2.5 million to her. An accountant overseeing her finances resigned over concerns about how transactions and money flows were reported; other accountants have raised issues with the overlap of personal income and business dealings.

=== Princess Sofia, Duchess of Värmland ===
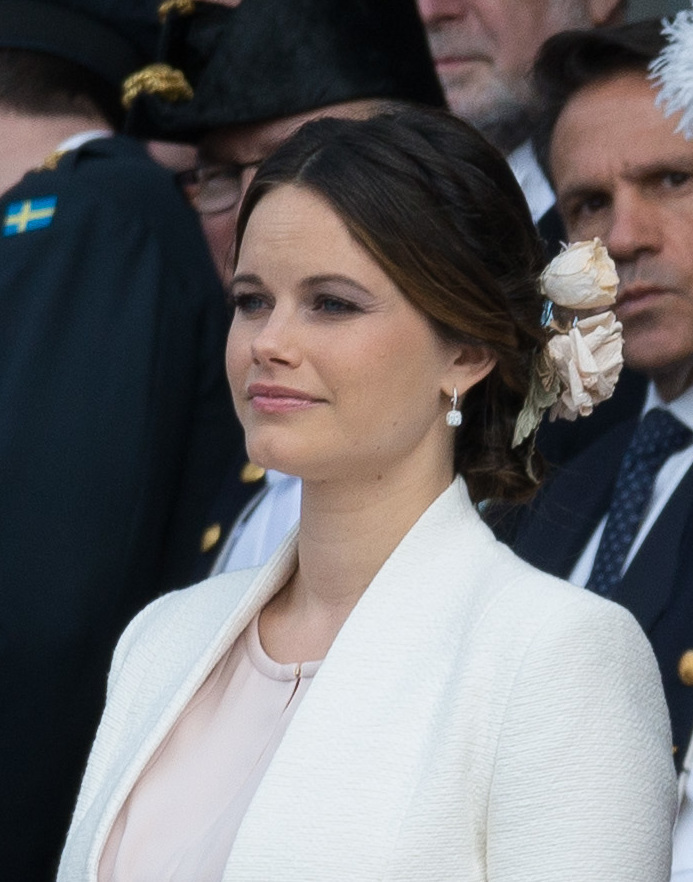
Princess Sofia, Duchess of Värmland

Princess Sofia is a Swedish royal and former model. She met Epstein on a few occasions in 2005, prior to her marriage, while living in New York City. A 2005 email showed that Epstein invited her to his Caribbean estate, which the Swedish Royal Court claims she declined. A 2010 photograph of Sofia was sent to Epstein by her mentor, financier Barbro Ehnbom. Epstein invited Sofia to a private Broadway screening in 2012.

=== Kevin Spacey ===
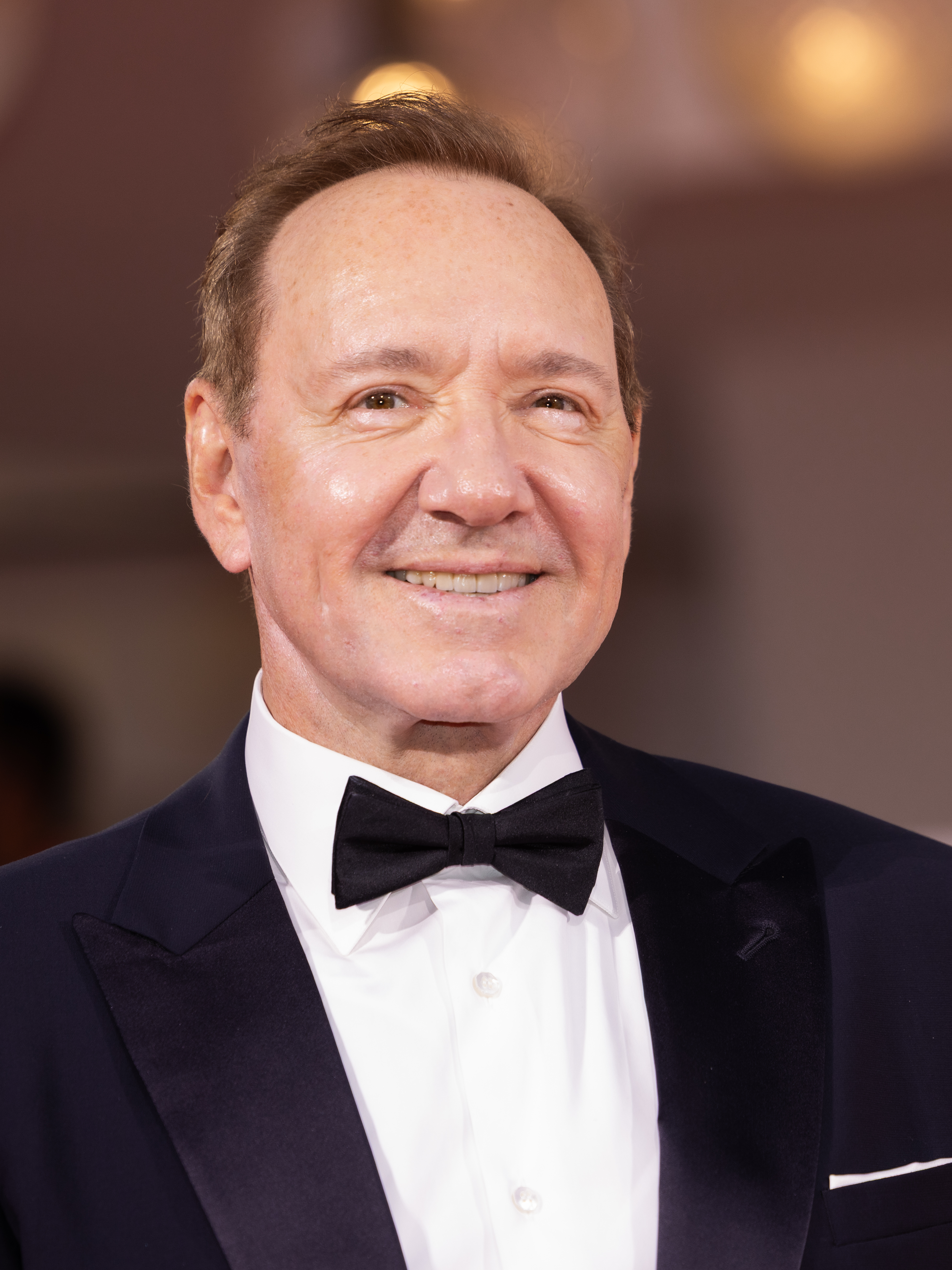
Kevin Spacey

Kevin Spacey is an American actor. Undated photographs showed him standing with Epstein. Other images showed Spacey visiting the Churchill War Rooms with Bill Clinton and Ghislaine Maxwell during a 2002 visit to the UK as part of a Clinton Foundation humanitarian trip. Spacey told journalist Piers Morgan in 2024 that he traveled on Epstein's plane for the foundation trip but that "he never spent time with him". He has not been accused of wrongdoing in relation to Epstein.

=== Jes Staley ===
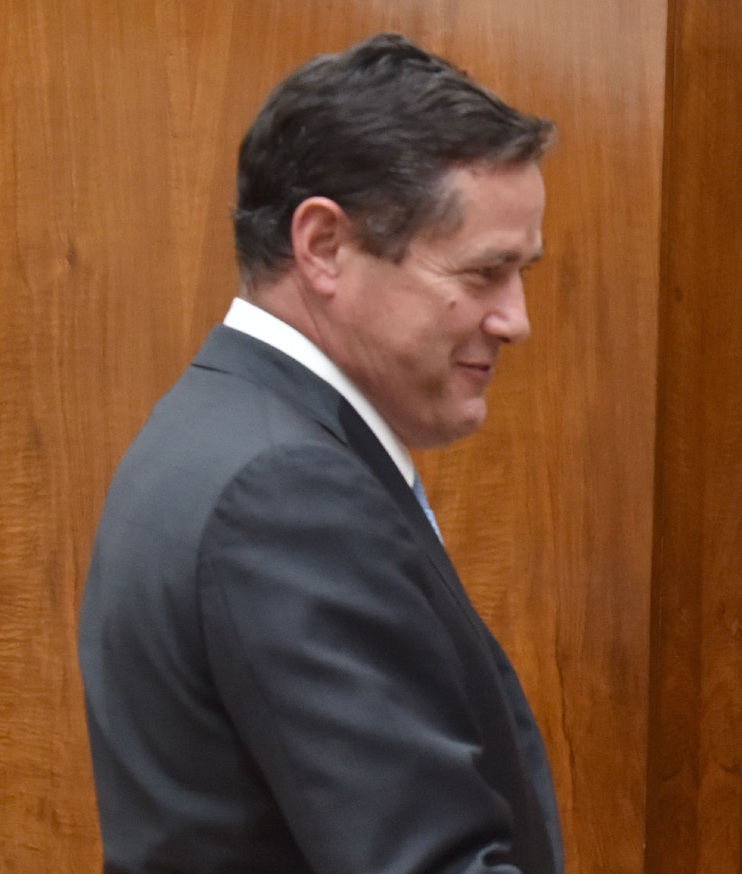
Jes Staley

Jes Staley is the former group CEO of Barclays. He was one of three trustees of Epstein's estate until 2015, counter to what Staley testified in court. In 2021, Staley stepped down from his position at Barclays. When he appealed the lifetime ban he received from the Financial Conduct Authority over this relationship, he was forced to testify about the content of emails exchanged with Epstein. In December 2025, it was revealed that Staley and Lawrence Summers had been appointed as executors by Epstein.

=== Ken Starr ===
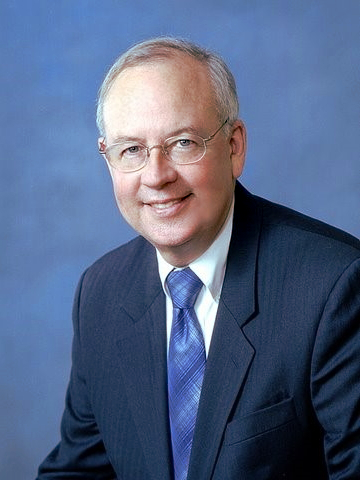
Ken Starr

Ken Starr helped secure Epstein's 2008 plea deal. In 2012, Starr hosted Epstein at Baylor University. In released emails from 2016, Starr and Epstein are affectionate; they also discussed Baylor's sexual assault scandals. In 2017, Epstein asked Starr for advice on Krauss' handling of sexual misconduct allegations.

=== David Stern ===
David Stern is a German businessman. In 2010, while UK trade envoy, Prince Andrew apparently passed on an email conversation about the Royal Bank of Scotland and Aston Martin to Stern, who allegedly passed it on to Epstein.

=== Sultan Ahmed bin Sulayem ===
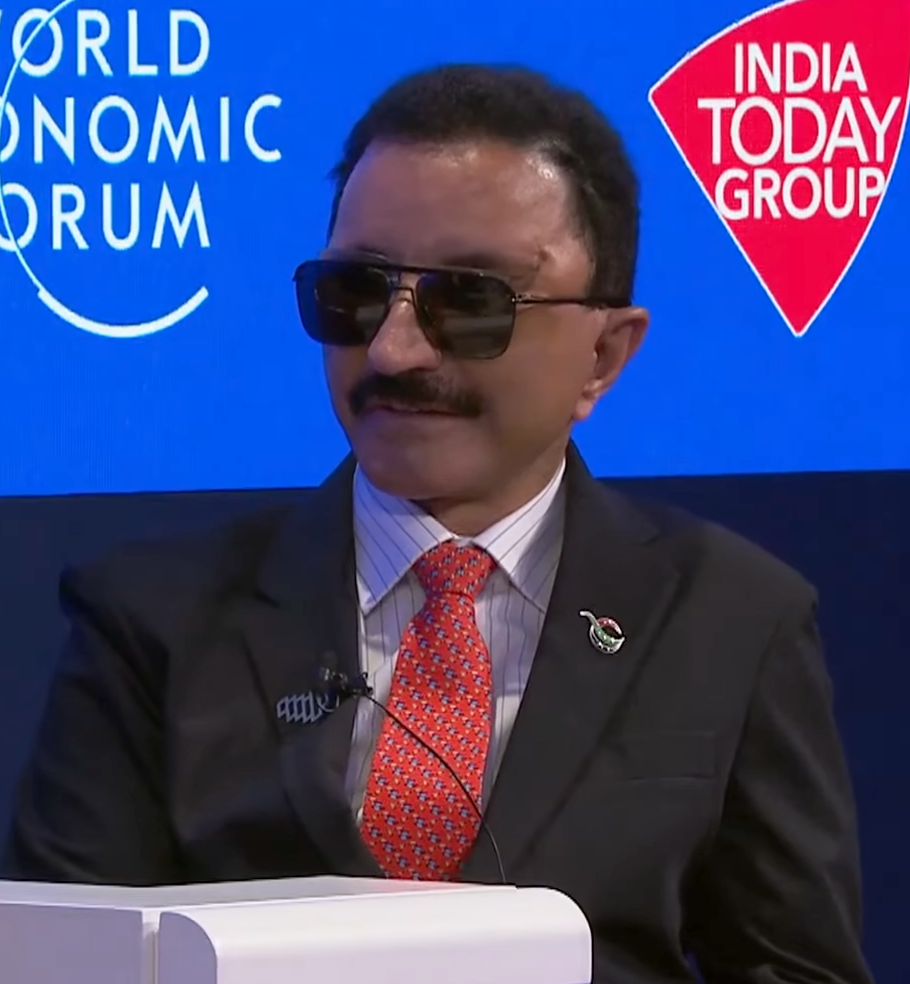
Sultan Ahmed bin Sulayem

Sultan Ahmed bin Sulayem is an Emirati businessman to whom Epstein emailed in 2009: "I loved the torture video". The Department of Justice redacted his name, but Representative Thomas Massie revealed it. In 2014, Bin Sulayem had Epstein ask Peter Mandelson to join the board of one of his companies. In 2017, he introduced Ambani to Epstein. Other exchanges show Bin Sulayem facilitating the transfer of Epstein's masseuse to a spa in Turkey, and Epstein advising Bin Sulayem on attending Trump's first inauguration. Bin Sulayem has been replaced as chair and CEO of DP World.

=== Larry Summers ===
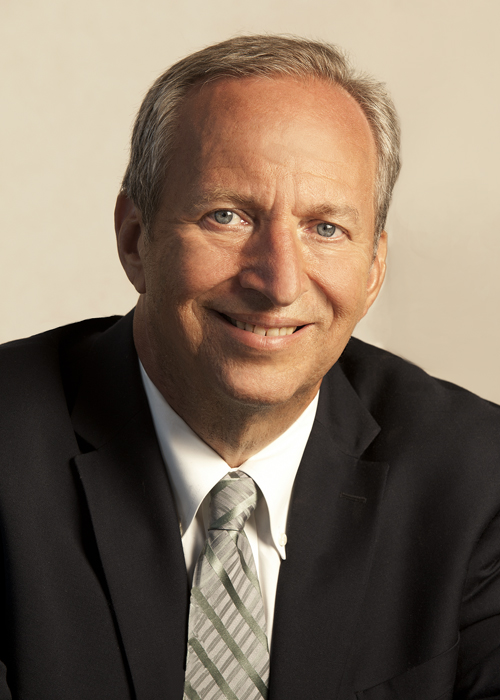
Lawrence H. Summers

Lawrence H. Summers is a former US treasury secretary and Harvard president. Summers discussed his romantic pursuit of a woman with Epstein. Their communications continued until days before Epstein's 2019 arrest. After Harvard began reviewing his ties, Summers took leave, then announced he would resign his academic and faculty appointments. He resigned his role at the Mossavar-Rahmani Center for Business and Government, and positions on the OpenAI board, the Center for American Progress, and Yale's Budget Lab. His contributor contract at The New York Times was not renewed.

== T ==
=== Corina Tarnita ===
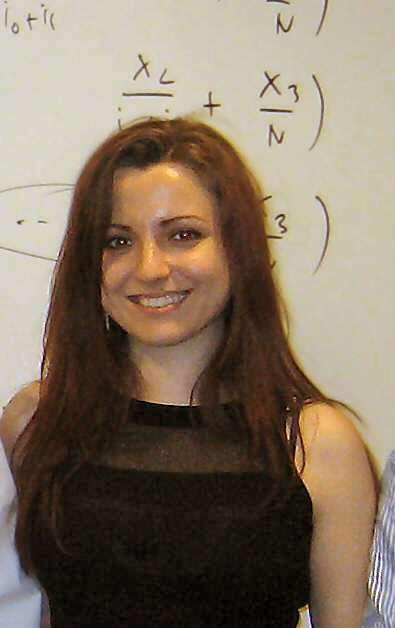
Corina Tarnita

Corina Tarnita met convicted sex offender Jeffrey Epstein while she was a graduate student working under Nowak at Harvard in 2008. She remained in contact with Epstein through 2012, including emails that refer to his 2008 conviction. In 2009, she helped Epstein anonymously wire transfer $10,000 and $5,000 respectively to two Romanian women for scholarships.

=== Peter Thiel ===
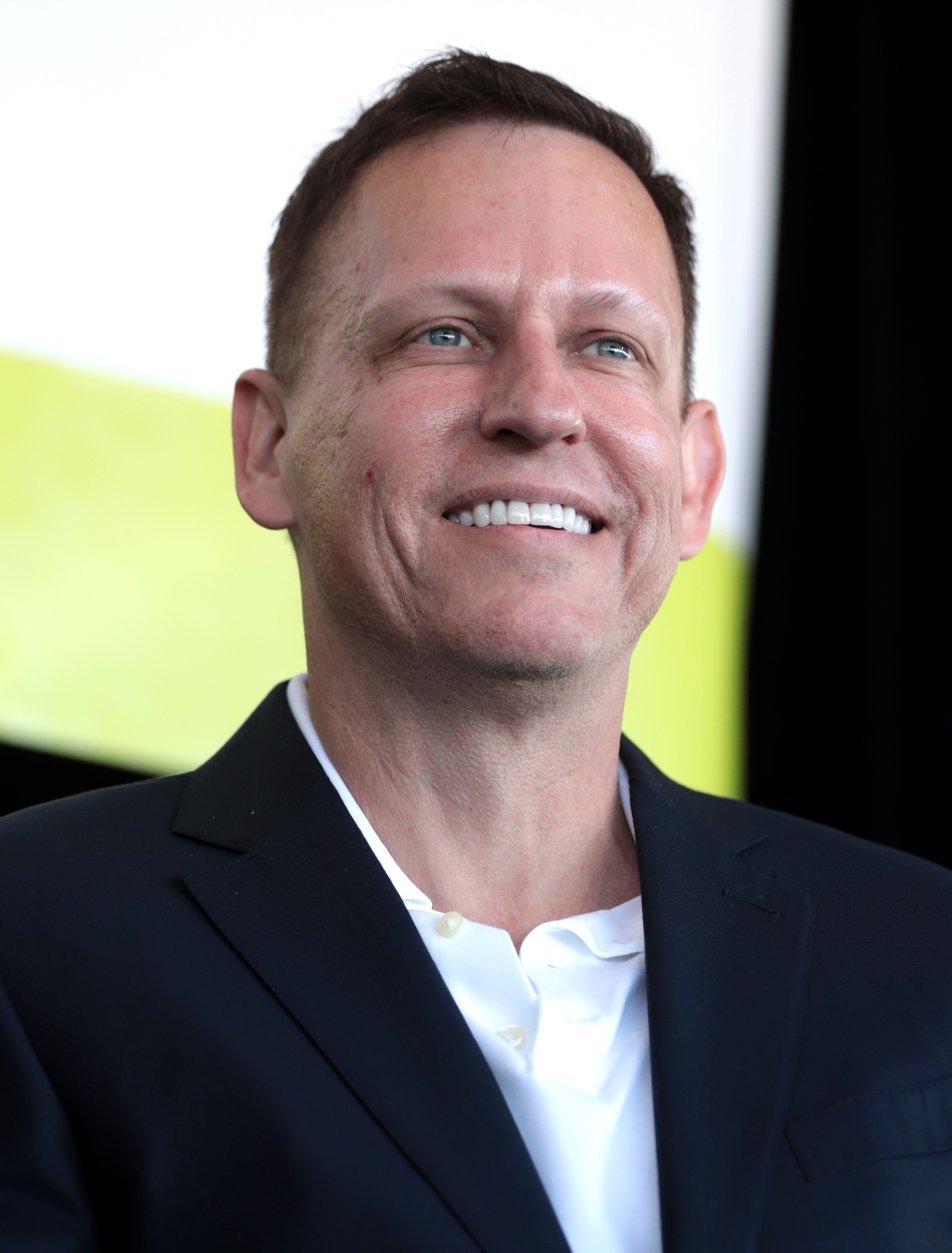
Peter Thiel

Peter Thiel co-founded PayPal and Palantir Technologies. Documents showed that an investment firm co-founded by Thiel accepted $40 million from Epstein and that the two corresponded for at least five years. In 2018, Epstein urged Thiel to "Visit me Caribbean." A spokesman for Thiel said Thiel "never went to Epstein's island". Epstein called Thiel "a great friend" and offered fiscal advice. In an email to Tom Pritzker, Epstein described a dinner with Thiel, Zuckerberg, Musk, and Hoffman as "wild".

=== Amanda Thirsk ===
Amanda Thirsk is a British business executive. She was Andrew Mountbatten-Windsor's private secretary and arranged meetings between Epstein and Mountbatten-Windsor.

=== Jess Ting ===
Ting is a plastic surgeon since 2016. Hundreds of emails detailed visits to Epstein's homes and island, coordination for medical care to "a few female associates", and funding outreach for Mount Sinai.

=== Steve Tisch ===
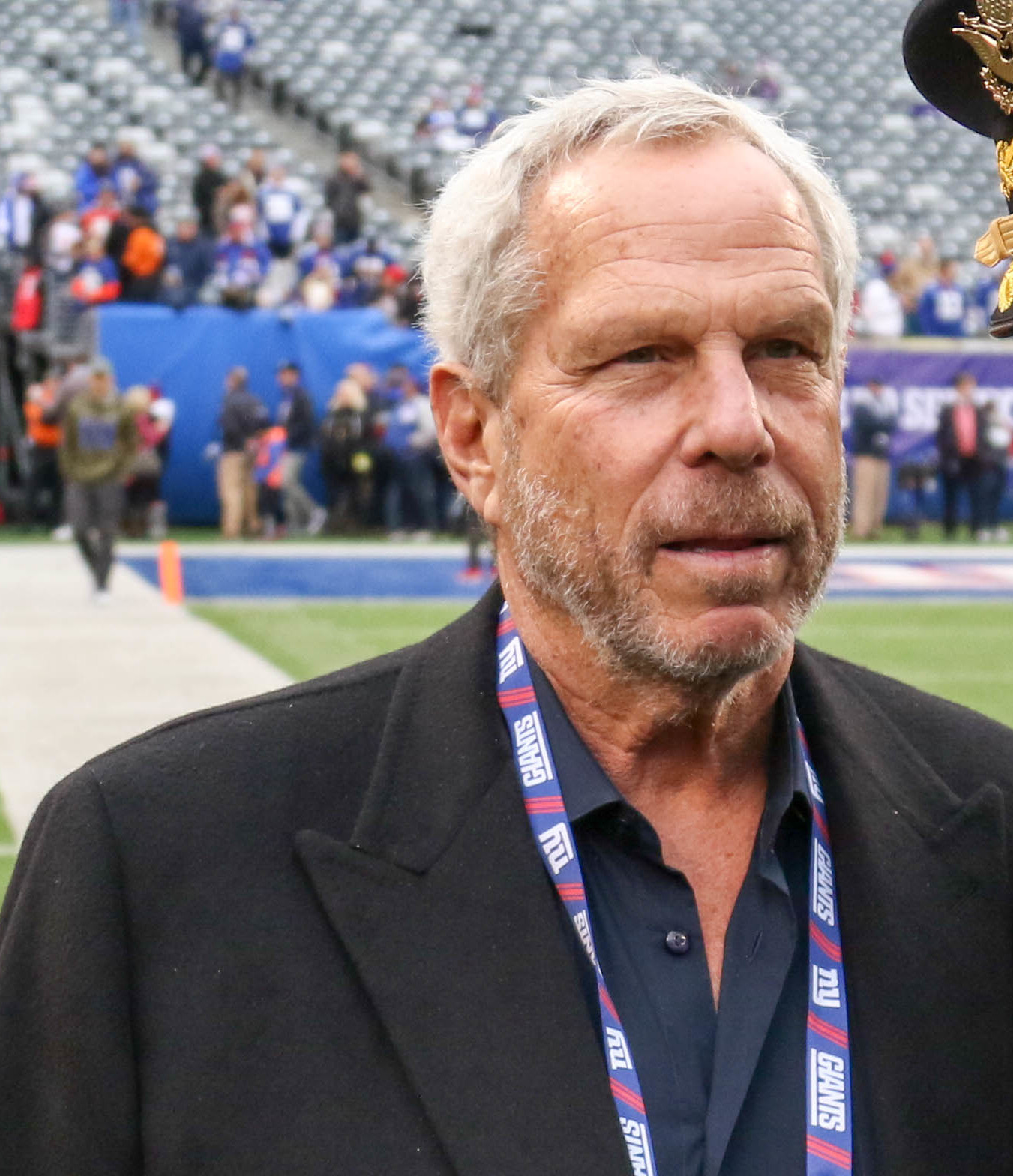
Steve Tisch

Steve Tisch is a New York Giants co-owner. In 2013 he and Epstein discussed women, with Epstein describing their physical features. Tisch said he regretted "associating with" Epstein. The NFL stated they would weigh whether Tisch's emails violated its personal conduct policies.

=== Jean Todt ===
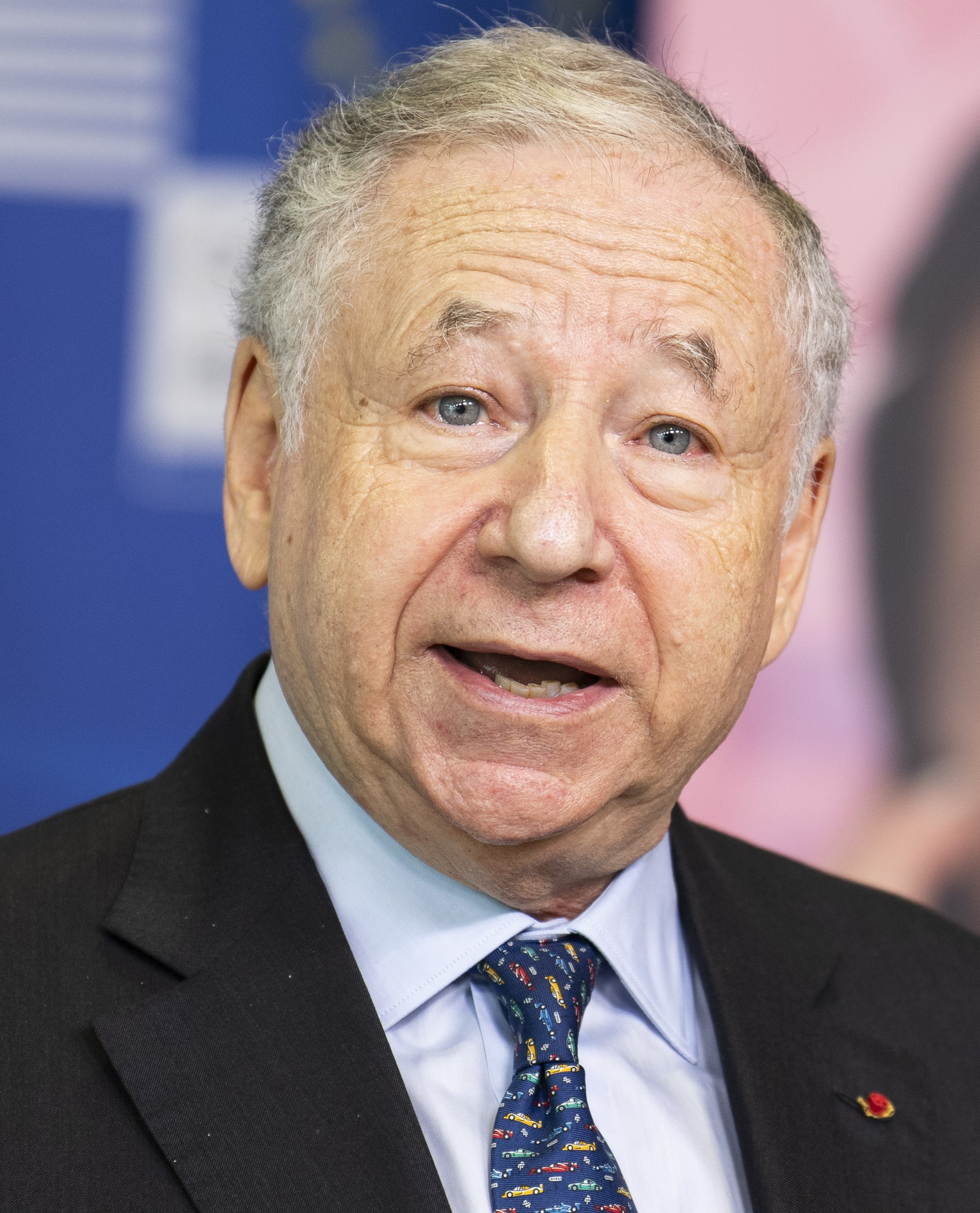
Jean Todt

Jean Todt is a French motor racing executive, former president of FIA, and UN Special Envoy. Todt visited Epstein's home in 2017. They had been introduced by Terje Rød-Larsen, who wrote to Epstein: "Think it could be useful for you to meet Jean Todt... Call him and invite him for coffee." After the meeting, Epstein emailed Eduardo Teodorani, Italian Chamber of Commerce and Industry chairman for the UK, saying that Todt was an "odd guy".

=== Mark Tramo ===
Mark Tramo is an adjunct professor at the UCLA department of neurology who corresponded with Epstein until the end. In October, Tramo sent a message pledging to stand by him. In 2010, he forwarded student emails to Epstein, who asked if any of the students were cute. The same year he agreed to Al Seckel's request to link to websites whitewashing Epstein. In 2017, one of Epstein's charities gave $100,000 to a research institution Tramo founded and directs. After his involvement with Epstein resurfaced, Tramo pleaded ignorance, and his profile was removed from UCLA's website.

=== Robert Trivers ===
Robert Trivers was an American evolutionary- and social- biologist. Much of his research was funded by Gordon Getty, and in 2013 he introduced Getty to Epstein, characterizing Epstein's crime as merely providing protection to young women. Trivers told Reuters in 2015 that Epstein gave him about $40,000 for his research. In December 2018, Trivers emailed Epstein about funding, writing that Epstein had once said he would "never not support me". In 2015, Trivers defended Epstein to Reuters, stating that girls "mature sooner than they used to" and that he did not "see these acts as so heinous".

=== Donald Trump ===
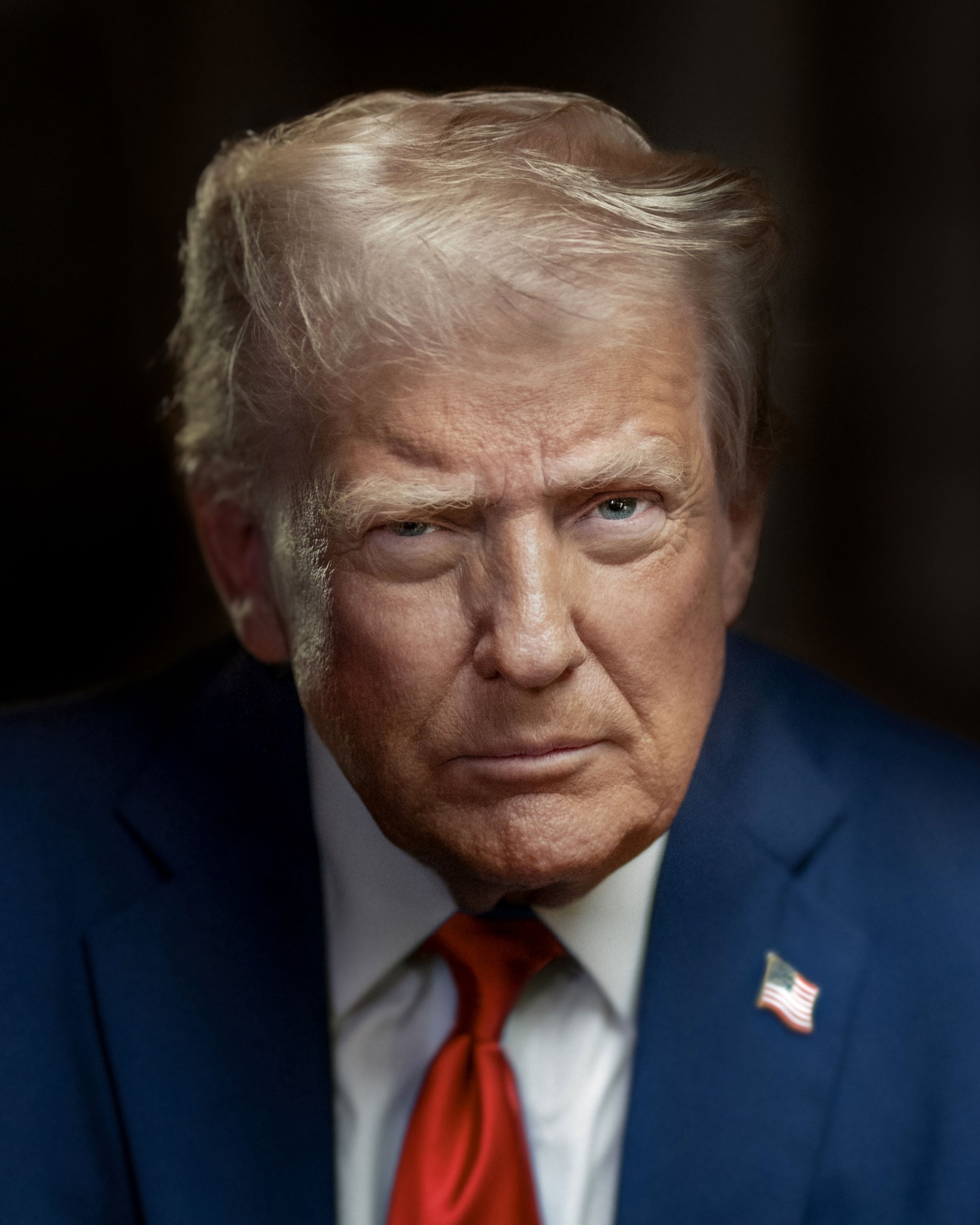
Donald Trump

The New York Times identified more than 5,300 files containing over 38,000 references to Donald Trump and related terms in the January 2026 release. Trump was among half a dozen prominent men about whom the FBI's files included what an official described as "salacious information", according to internal correspondence. Democrats on the House Oversight Committee released a letter matching this description, and apparently signed by Trump, on September 8, 2025.

=== Paul Tweed ===
Paul Tweed is an Irish lawyer who worked with Epstein on his UK media strategy.

== V ==
=== Brian Vickers ===
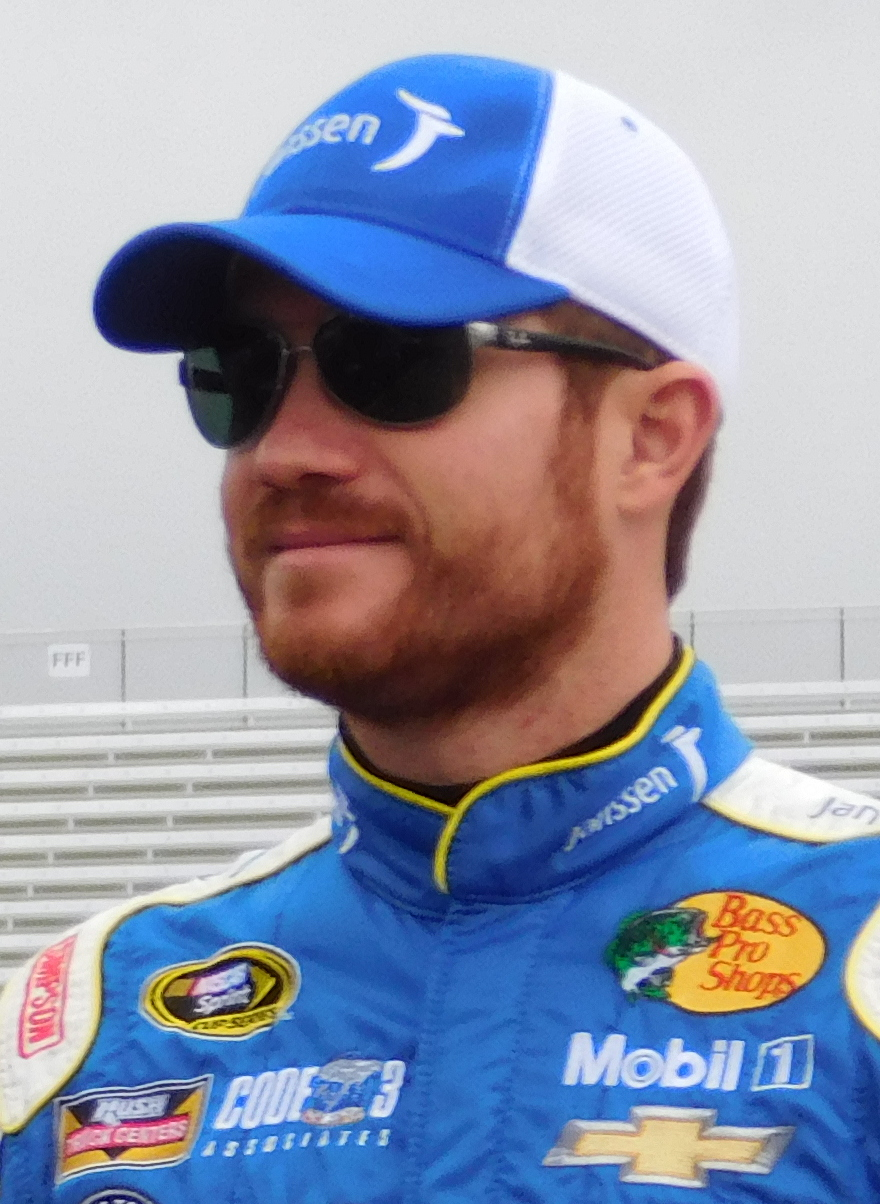
Brian Vickers

Files revealed a correspondence between Brian Vickers with Epstein starting in 2012. Emails from 2013 showed Epstein working on NASCAR sponsorships for the former car racer after news of his wife's involvement with Epstein began to surface; Epstein said he contacted Michael Waltrip and Rob Kauffman.

=== Steven Victor ===
Dr. Steven Victor is a dermatologist who was based in Manhattan. He treated girls and women referred by Epstein. His name is mentioned hundreds of times in emails. Victor treated some referred patients for free and pointedly did not give comments to reporters, and Epstein lent him $100,000 for his beauty-product company.

== W ==
=== Karim Wade ===
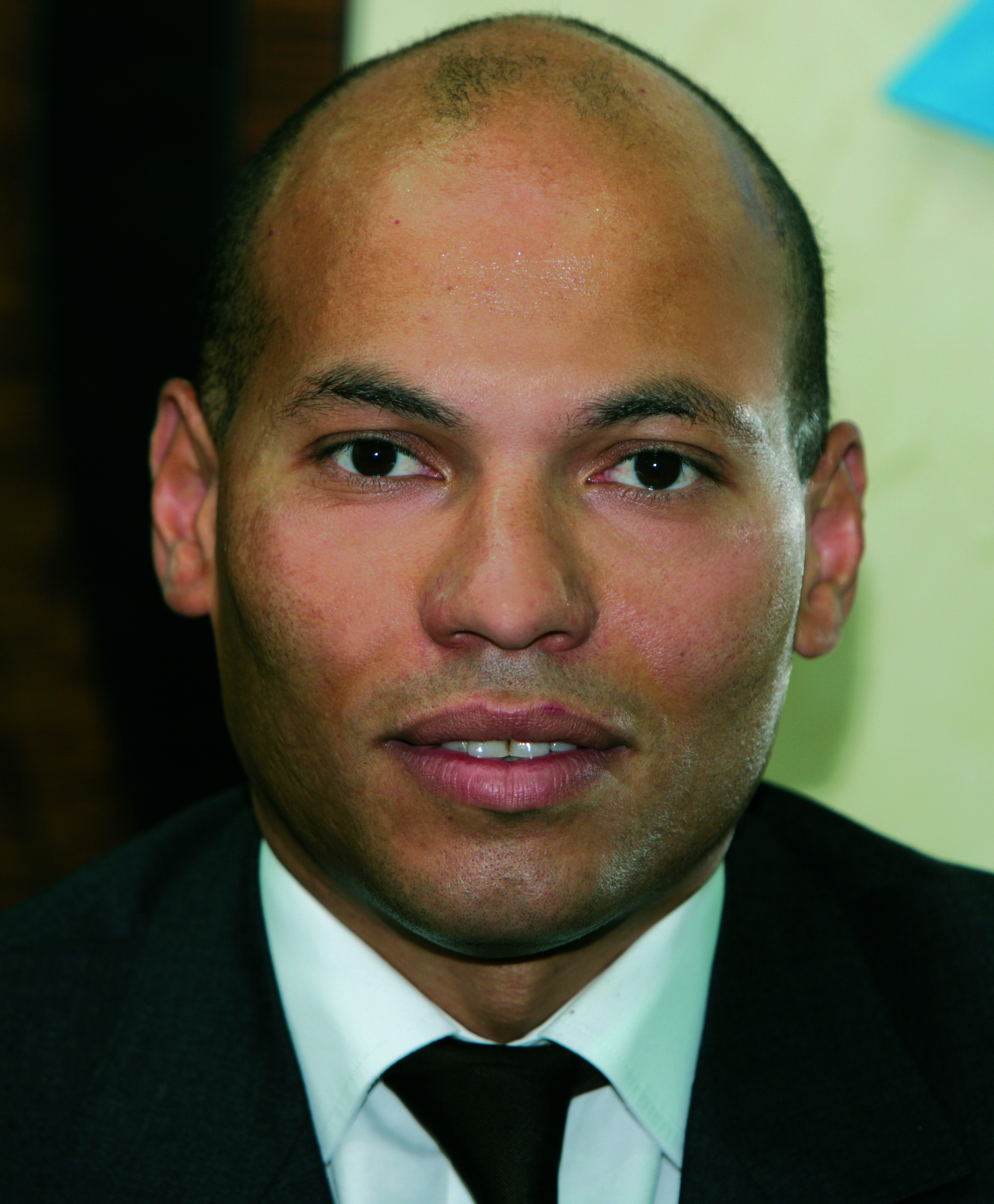
Karim Wade

Karim Wade is a Senegalese politician. Emails indicate that Epstein assisted Wade with legal and lobbying fees in relation to a corruption case in 2013.

=== Casey Wasserman ===
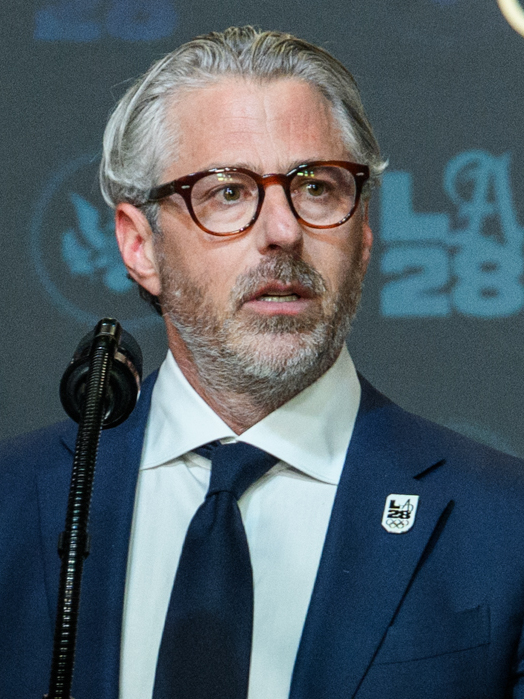
Casey Wasserman

Casey Wasserman is an American entertainment executive and sports agent. Wasserman and Maxwell exchanged emails in March and April 2003. Other documents showed Wasserman and his then-wife flew on Epstein's jet in September 2002 with Maxwell, Epstein, Bill Clinton, Kevin Spacey, and others as part of a humanitarian trip by the Clinton Foundation. Wasserman published a regretful statement, and announced he was selling his talent agency after clients left.

=== Les Wexner ===
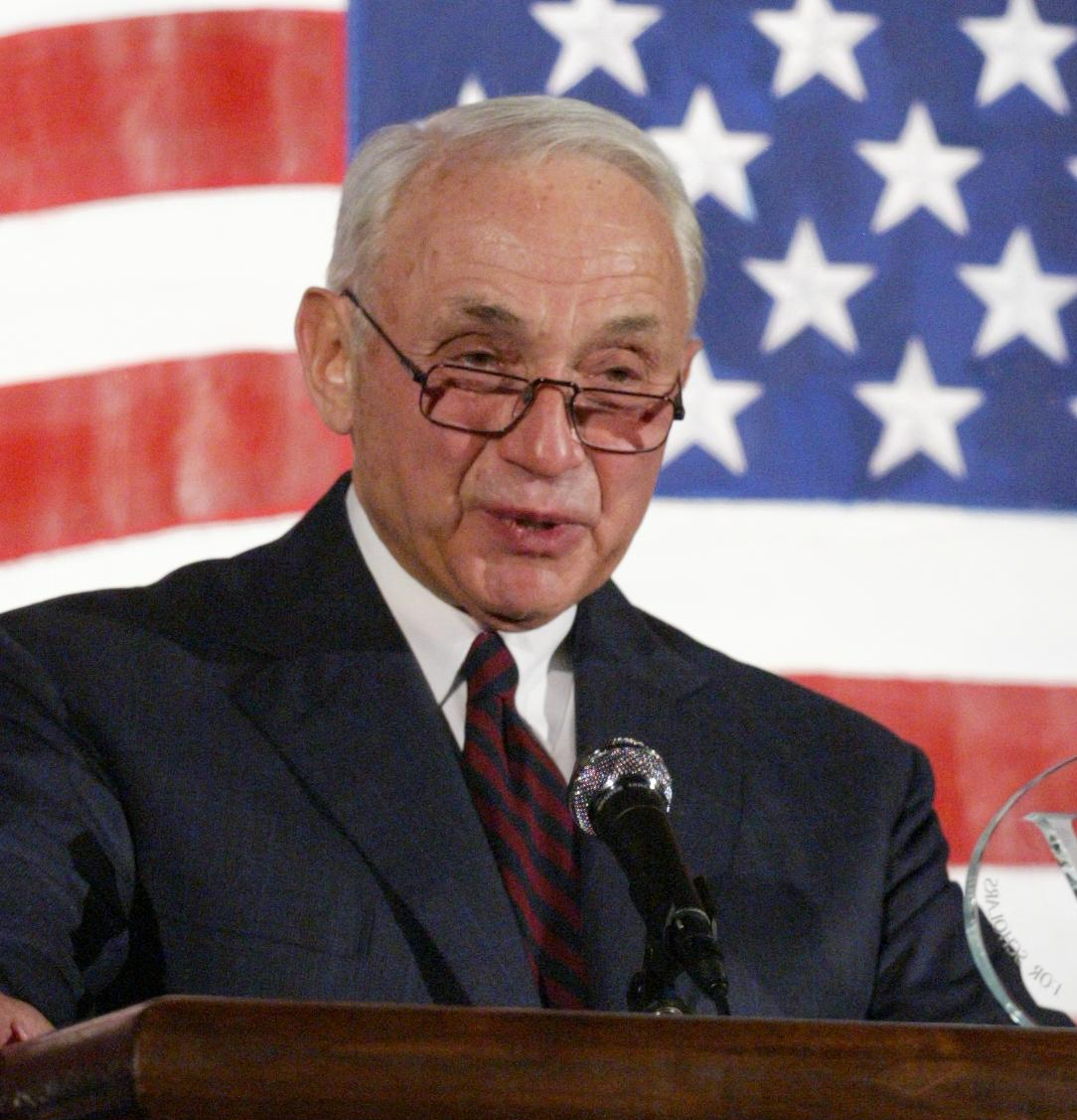
Les Wexner

Les Wexner is an American billionaire businessman. In an unsent draft letter that was released by the DOJ, Epstein wrote to Wexner, "You and I had 'gang stuff' for over 15 years" and then refers to secrets the two of them kept from Wexner's wife. Weeks after Epstein's death, JPMorgan Chase filed a suspicious activity report for transactions conducted by Wexner as well as Glenn Dubin, Leon Black, and Alan Dershowitz, totalling about $1 billion. These reports were unsealed by a federal judge.

=== Nathan Wolfe ===
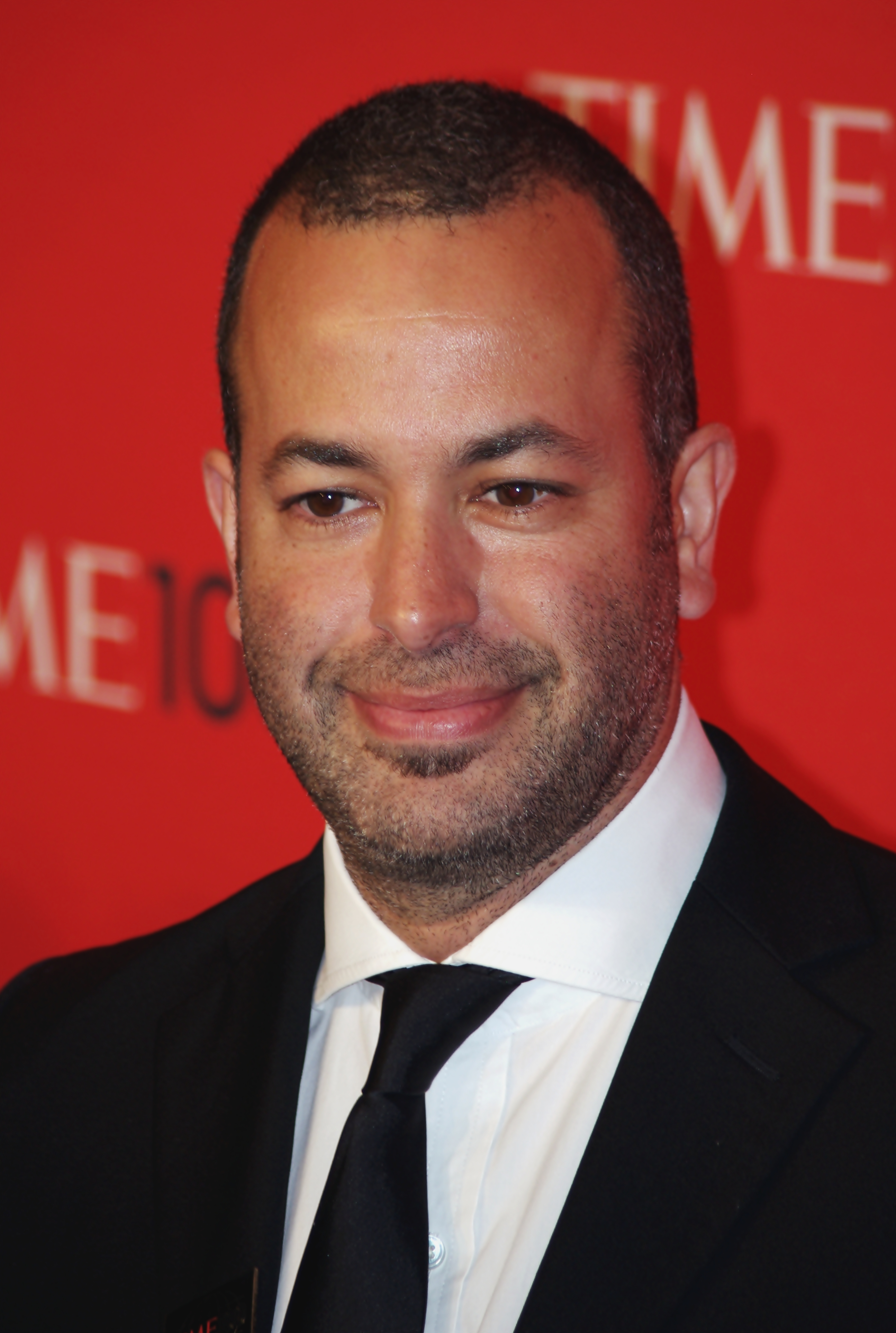
Nathan Wolfe

Nathan Wolfe is a former professor of virology at Stanford University. He corresponded with Epstein between 2008 and 2013. His name appears almost 600 times in the released files, and include emails about "female Viagra", invitations to dinners with "hottie interns", and research into female sex drive and sexual behavior. Three years after Epstein pled guilty to felony minor prostitution charges, Wolfe urged him "never to let the bastards get you down."

=== Michael Wolff ===
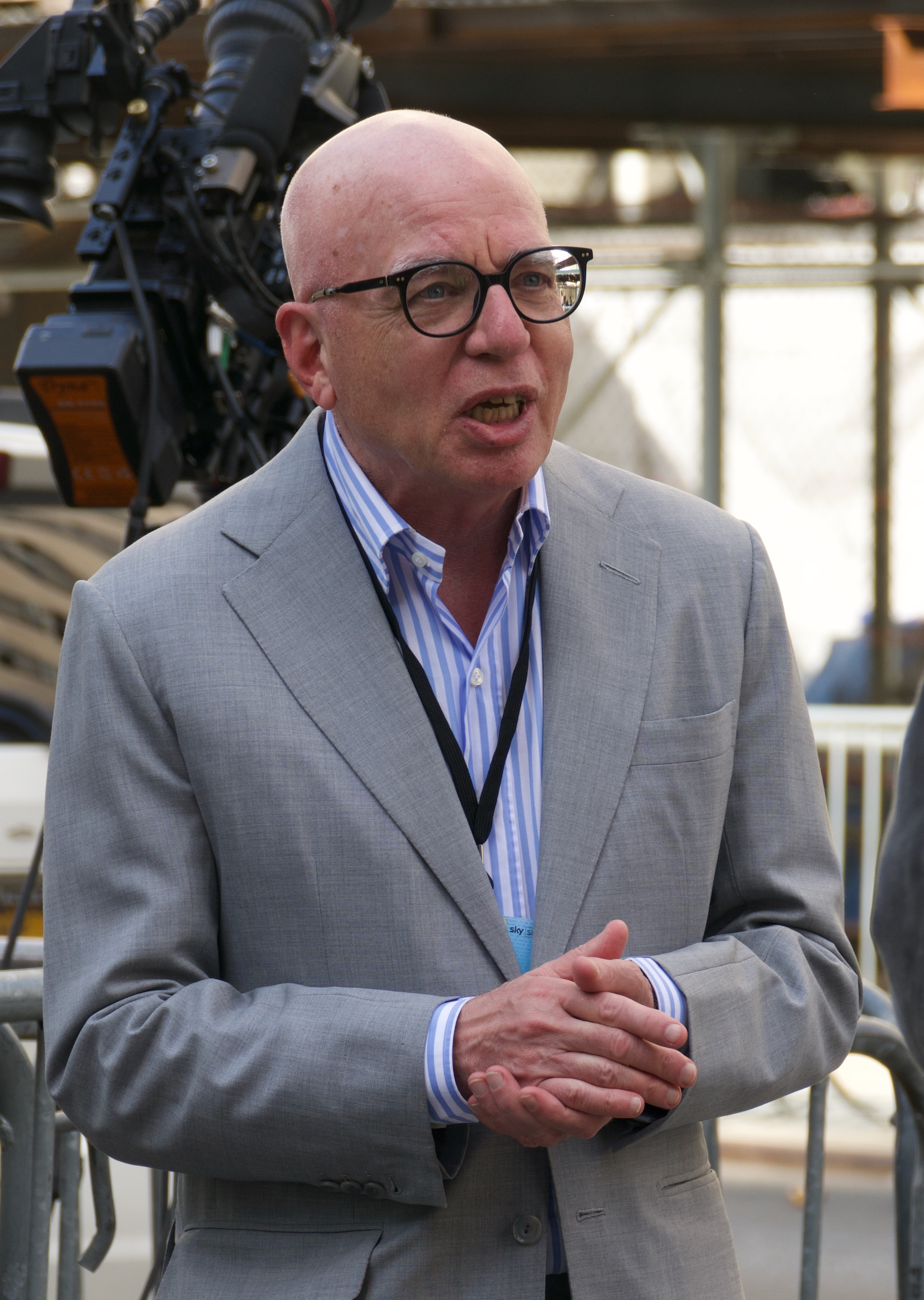
Michael Wolff

Michael Wolff is a journalist with an extended correspondence with Epstein, whom Wolff previously said was a source for his 2018 book. In December 2015, Wolff told Epstein that CNN planned to ask Trump about his relationship with Epstein; when Epstein asked about crafting an answer, Wolff responded, "I think you should let him hang himself." In October 2016, after the Access Hollywood tape surfaced, Wolff wrote to Epstein that there was an "opportunity to come forward this week and talk about Trump in such a way that could garner you great sympathy and help finish him". Wolff described the emails as "embarrassing" but defended his approach as "playacting" to obtain information about Trump.

== Z ==
=== Mark Zuckerberg ===
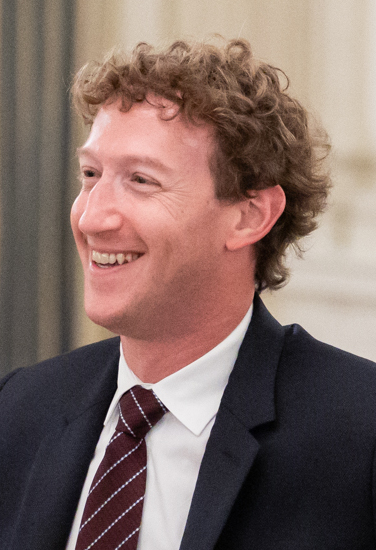
Mark Zuckerberg

Mark Zuckerberg is an American billionaire businessman and co-founder of Meta. In an email to Thomas Pritzker, Epstein described a 2015 dinner with Zuckerberg, Musk, Thiel and Hoffman as "wild". Subsequent emails indicate that Zuckerberg asked for Epstein's contact, and that they discussed the idea that connectivity could help solve poverty.

=== Mortimer Zuckerman ===
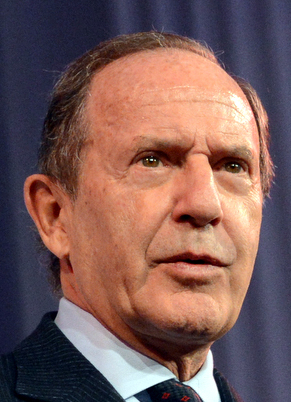
Mortimer Zuckerman

Mortimer Zuckerman is a billionaire media proprietor. He signed Epstein's 2003 birthday book and partnered with Epstein in 2003–2004 in media ventures. Between 2013 and 2015 he paid Epstein millions for estate planning and financial services. After a 2015 meeting, Epstein urged Zuckerman to enter a guardianship or conservatorship.
