= Madoun =

Madoun (Arabic: مادون) is an Arabic surname. As of 2014, the surname is used by 1,104 people, being the most prevalent in Algeria and Morocco. Notable people with the surname include:

- Ahmad Madoun (1941–1983), Syrian artist
- Kamel Madoun (c. 1960 – 2020), Algerian handball player and coach
