= National Museum of Damascus =

Museum in Damascus, Syria

National Museum of Damascus الْمَتْحَفُ الْوَطَنِيُّ بِدِمَشْقَ
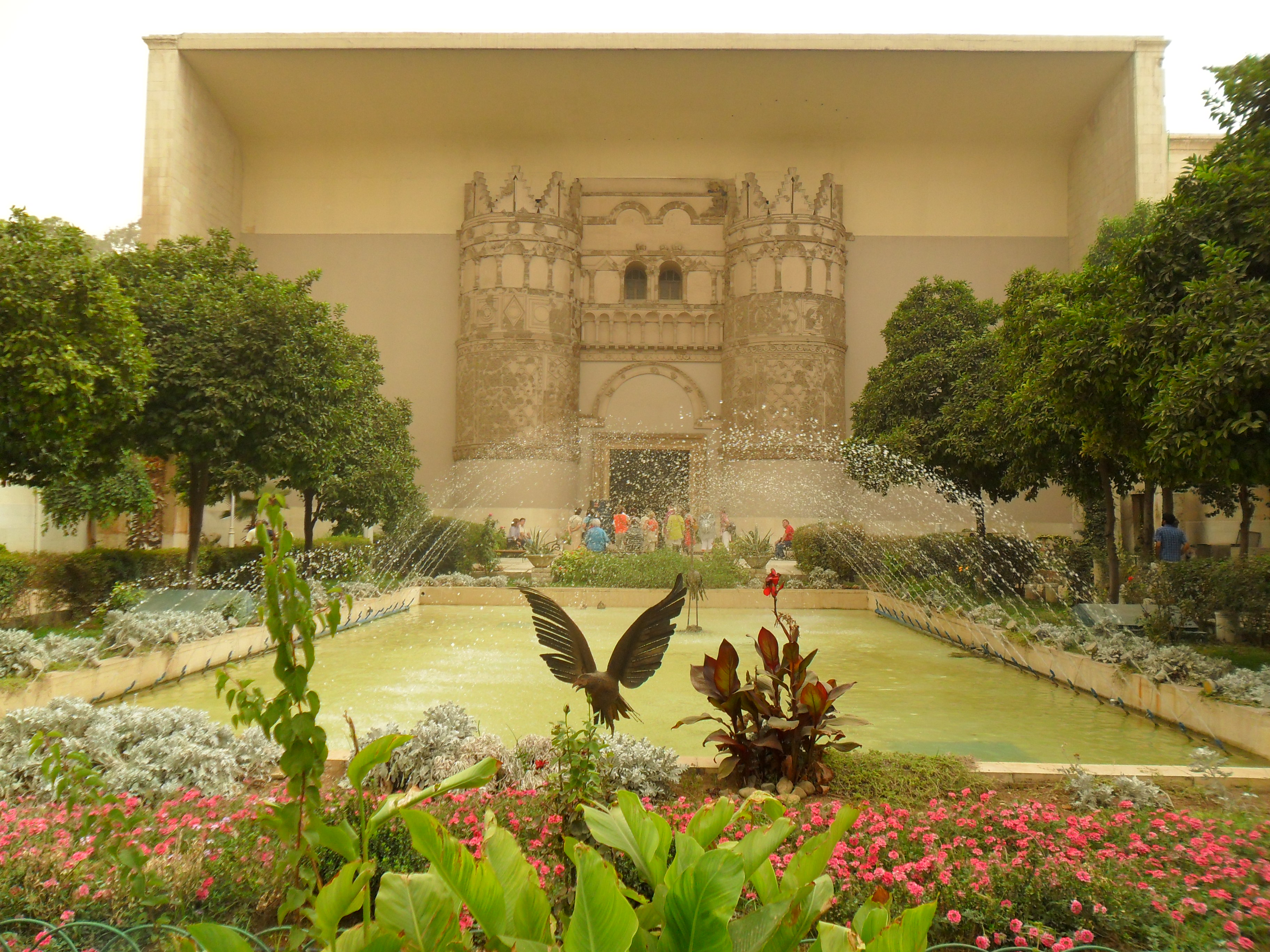
- Front view of the museum
- Established: 1919; 107 years ago
- Location: Shukri al-Quwatli Street, Damascus, Syria
- Coordinates: 33.512572°N 36.290044°E
- Type: Archaeological
- Collection size: Over 300,000
- Directors: Mahmoud Hammoud (Head of the General Directorate for Antiquities and Museums)
- Website: dgam.gov.sy

The National Museum of Damascus (Arabic: الْمَتْحَفُ الْوَطَنِيُّ بِدِمَشْقَ) is a museum in the heart of Damascus, Syria. As the country's national museum as well as its largest, this museum covers the entire range of Syrian history spanning over 11 millennia. It displays various important artifacts, relics and major finds most notably from Mari, Ebla and Ugarit, three of Syria's most important ancient archaeological sites. Established in 1919, during King Faisal's short-lived Arab Kingdom of Syria, the museum is the oldest cultural heritage institution in Syria.

Among the museum's highlights is the Dura-Europos synagogue, a reconstructed synagogue dated to 245 CE, which was moved piece by piece to Damascus in the 1930s. It is noted for its vibrant and well preserved wall paintings and frescoes. The museum houses over 5000 cuneiform tablets, among them the first known alphabet in history, written down on a clay tablet, the Ugaritic alphabet. Also on show are 2nd-century murals, elaborate tombs, and the recently restored Lion of al-Lat, which stood at the National Museum of Palmyra but was moved to Damascus for safeguarding.

The museum's entrance is surrounded by the reconstructed gate of Qasr al-Hayr al-Gharbi which is an Umayyad desert castle built in 727 CE.

== Location ==
The National Museum of Damascus lies west of the city, between the Damascus University and the Sulaymaniyya Takiyya on Shukri al-Quwatli street.

== History ==
The first museum was founded in 1919 under the supervision of the Syrian Ministry of Education at Al-Adiliyah Madrasa and housed a smaller collection until moving to its current location. The current building was built in 1936 next to Sulaymaniyya Takiyya. The facade incorporates the front walls of the Umayyad palace of Qasr al-Hayr al-Gharbi, which were removed from their location in the Syrian Desert.

The façade of the palace was transported to Damascus and used in the construction of the museum's main entrance. The process took several years and the official opening was celebrated in 1950. By this time, new halls and wings were added as the collection grew. In 1953, a three-storey wing was added to display more Islamic period exhibits as well as contemporary Syrian art.

In 1963, a new lecture hall and a library were added. This lecture hall was furnished as a 19th-century Ottoman-era Damascene reception hall, lavishly decorated and ornamented, as most Damascene palaces of that time. Later additions were made in 1974 to house exhibits from the Paleolithic period. The most recent addition took place in 2004, when the temporary exhibition wing was reworked to display Neolithic antiquities.

The museum temporarily closed its doors in 2012, after the Syrian Civil War. The museum authorities hid over 300,000 artifacts in secret locations to safeguard them from destruction and looting. After six years, the museum reopened four of its five wings on October 29, 2018.

The museum was closed again on 7 December 2024 after the fall of Damascus. To protect the museum from looting, the Directorate-General of Antiquities and Museums, Mohamed Nair Awad, requested security from Hayat Tahrir al-Sham, which sent fighters to secure the facility. The museum reopened on 8 January 2025.

On 9 November 2025, six marble statues from the Roman era were stolen following a break-in at the classical department. Syria’s Directorate General of Antiquities and Museums launched an investigation and a review of security measures in the wake of the theft.

In July 2026, France returned 23 Syrian archaeological objects which have been at the Arab World Institute in Paris since 2011. The museum displayed the objects in the summer of 2026 before returning them to their original museum.

== Exhibits ==
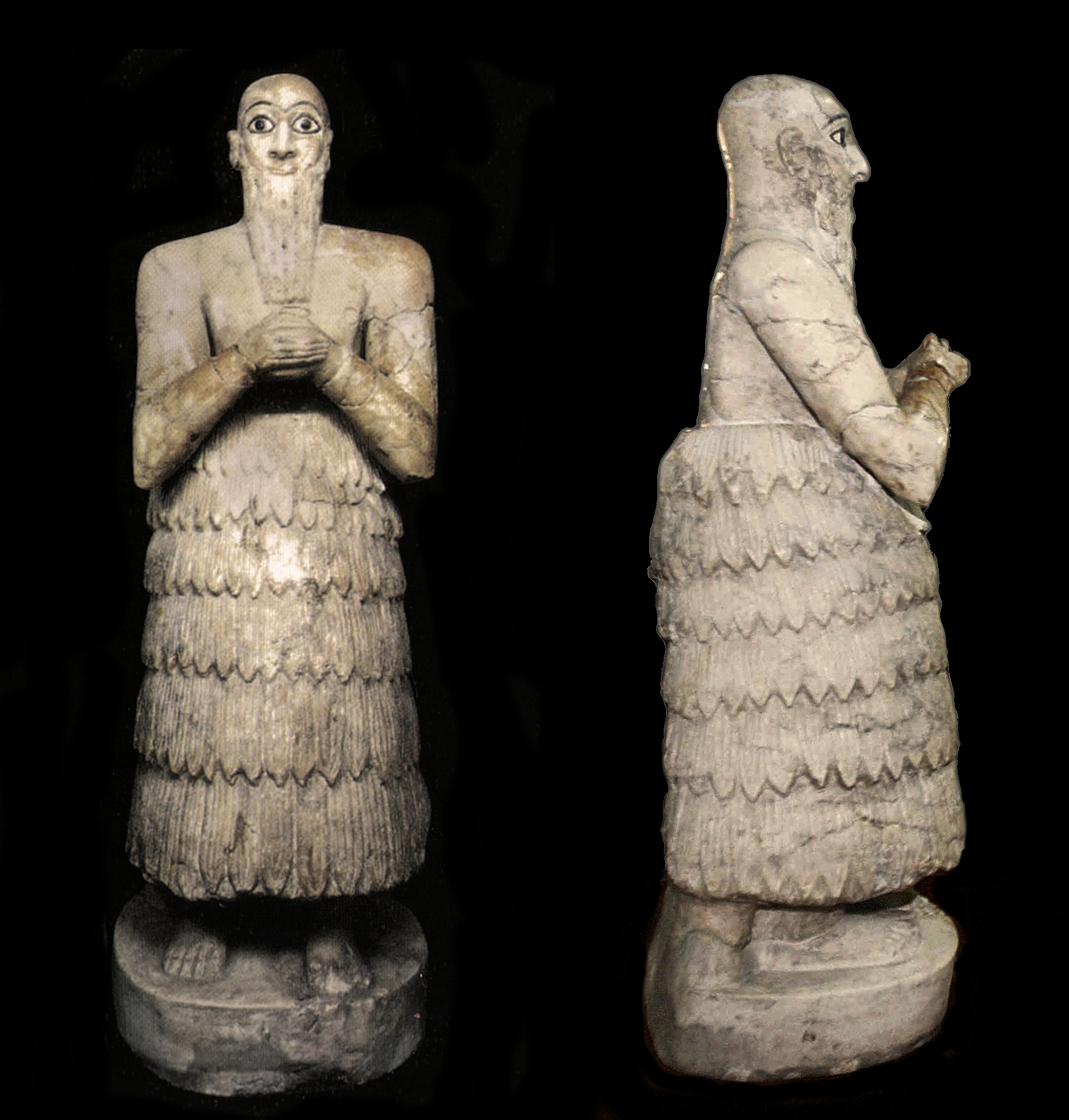
Statue of King Iku-Shamagan, c. 2500 BC. National Museum of Damascus

Some of the museum's unique exhibits are the restored wall paintings of the Dura Europos Synagogue from the 3rd century AD, the hypogeum of Yarhai from Palmyra, dating to 108 AD and the façade and frescoes of the Umayyad period Qasr Al-Heer Al-Gharbi, which dates back to the 8th century and lies 80 km south of Palmyra. Many other important historical artifacts can be found in various wings; such as the world's first alphabet from Ugarit and many Roman era mosaics. The exhibits are organised into 5 wings:

=== Prehistoric Age ===
Remains and skeletons from different Stone Age periods, most notably the Neolithic period, as well as objects and finds discovered in the basin of the Orontes River, the Euphrates and at Tell Ramad in southwestern Syria.

=== Ancient Syria ===
Among other exhibits, there are tablets, cylinder seals and amulets from ancient sites such as Ebla, Mari, Ugarit and sculptures from Tell Halaf. The most important of these is an Ugaritan cuneiform tablet, presenting the world's oldest existing alphabet. The museum also houses the oldest known substantially complete piece of notated music.

=== Greek and Roman/Byzantine (classical) Age ===
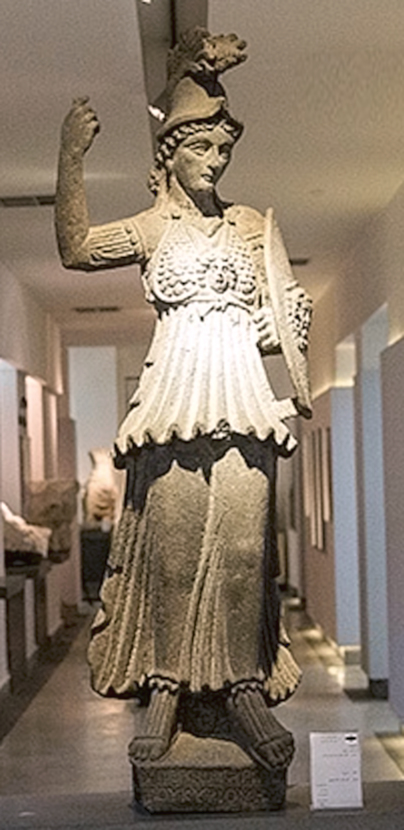
Al-Lat Minerva, National Museum of Damascus

This wing contains many classical Syrian artifacts. The displays include sculptures, marble and stone sarcophagi, mosaics, jewelry and coinage from the Seleucid, Roman and Byzantine periods. The findings are from sites such as Palmyra, Dura Europos, Mount Druze, and more, and most notably include many beautiful Byzantine era manuscripts and jewelry, as well as stone work, silk and cotton textiles from Palmyra, preserved by the desert sands.

Among the most important exhibits from the classical era counts the 3rd century underground Palmyrene tomb, the Hypogeum of Yarhai, considered one of the best examples of Palmyrene funerary art. The hypogeum was originally found in Palmyra's Valley of the Tombs, and after its excavation moved to the museum in 1935. The hypogeum, which dates from 108 AD, currently is found in the underground part of the museum, and can be reached after taking the stairs from room 15. There are also many pieces of Palmyrene funerary reliefs in the museum found in the Palmyra hall.

=== Islamic Age ===
The facade of an Islamic palace has been moved and reconstructed as the museum's main entrance. Some of the contents of the palace are also located in the museum, including carvings.

It also contains many exhibits made of glass and metal, as well as coins, from different periods of Islamic art history. There are also scriptures, ranging from the Umayyad era to the Ottoman period.

There is also a hall containing an example of a traditional Damascene home, which was obtained from an 18th-century house in the Old City of Damascus.

=== Contemporary art ===
This wing contains contemporary works of artists from Syria, the Arab world, and other countries.

The museum's holdings include works by Syrian painter Ahmad Madoun, whose paintings drew on the cultural heritage of Palmyra.

== Gallery ==
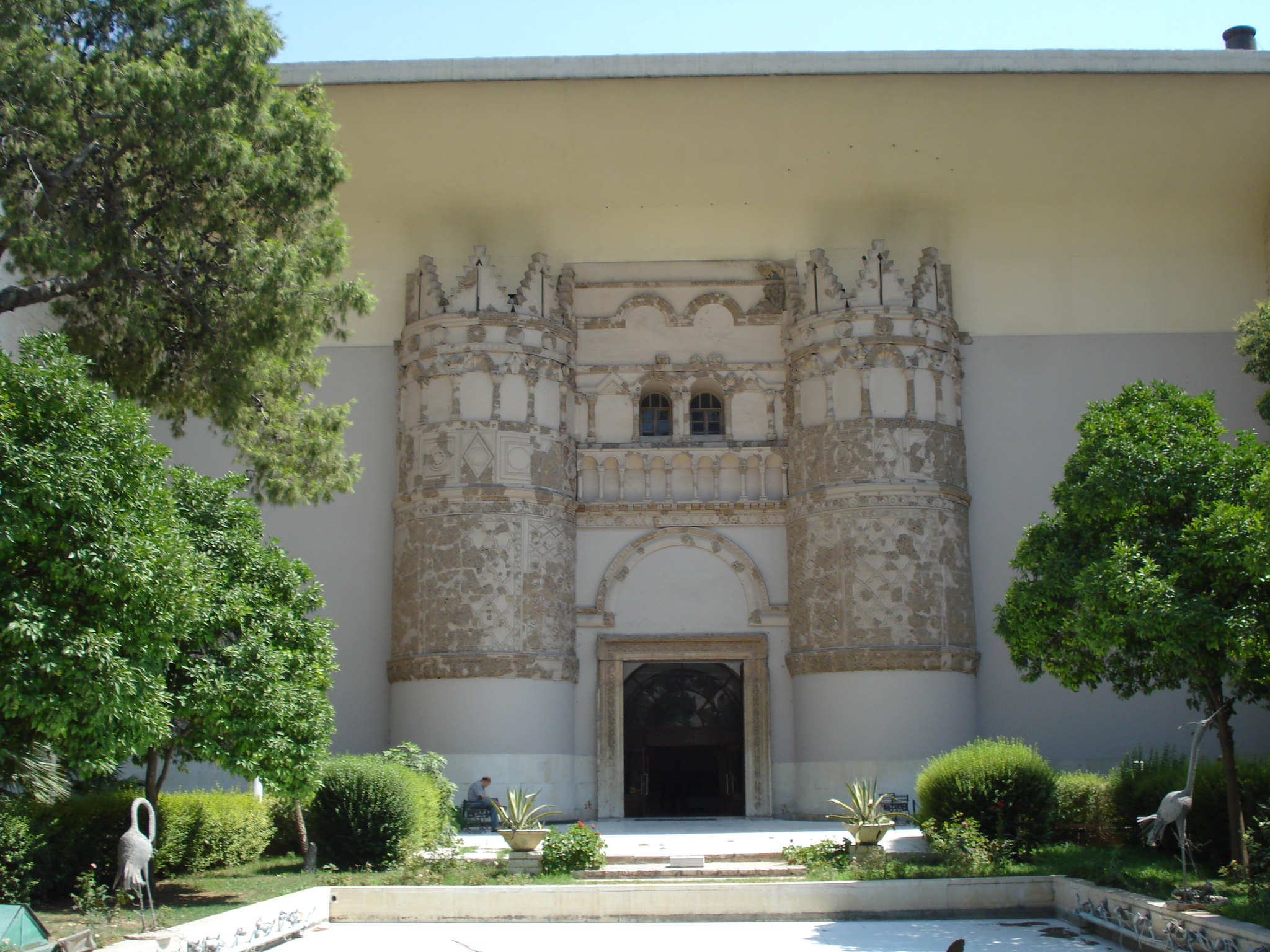
The museum's gate, an 8th-century Islamic palace

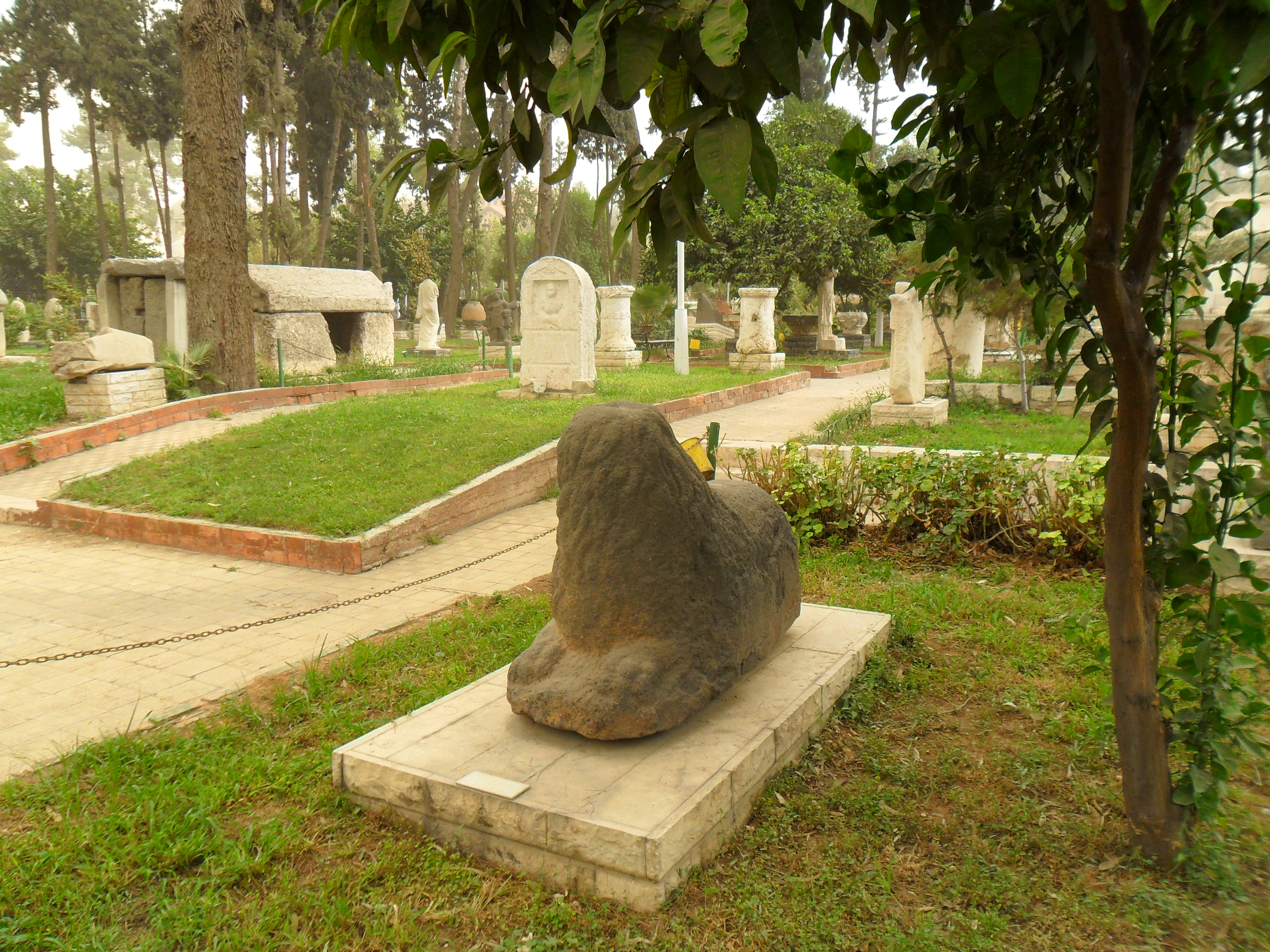
The museum's garden

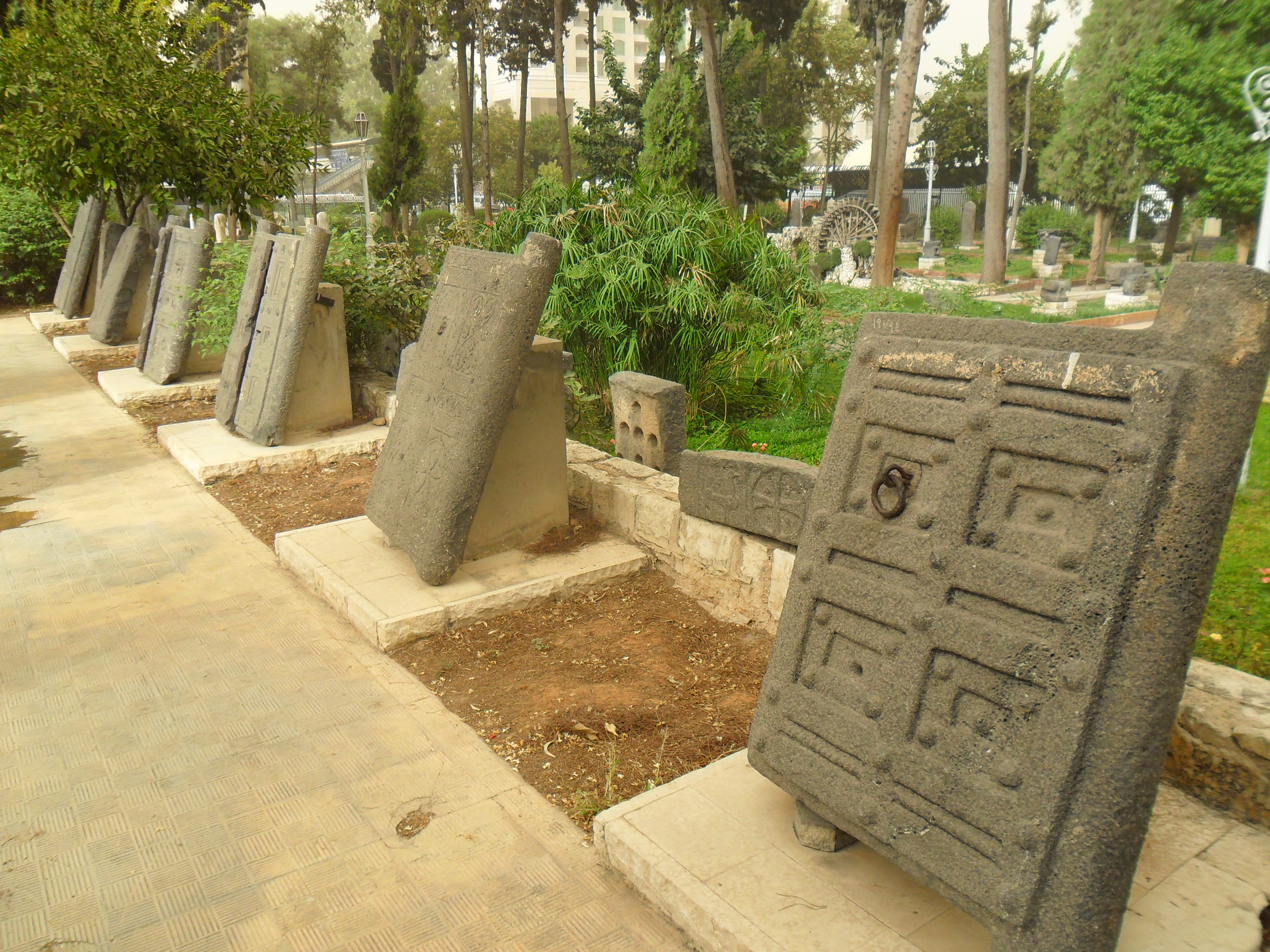
The museum's garden showcasing doors and ornaments from ancient Syrian temples

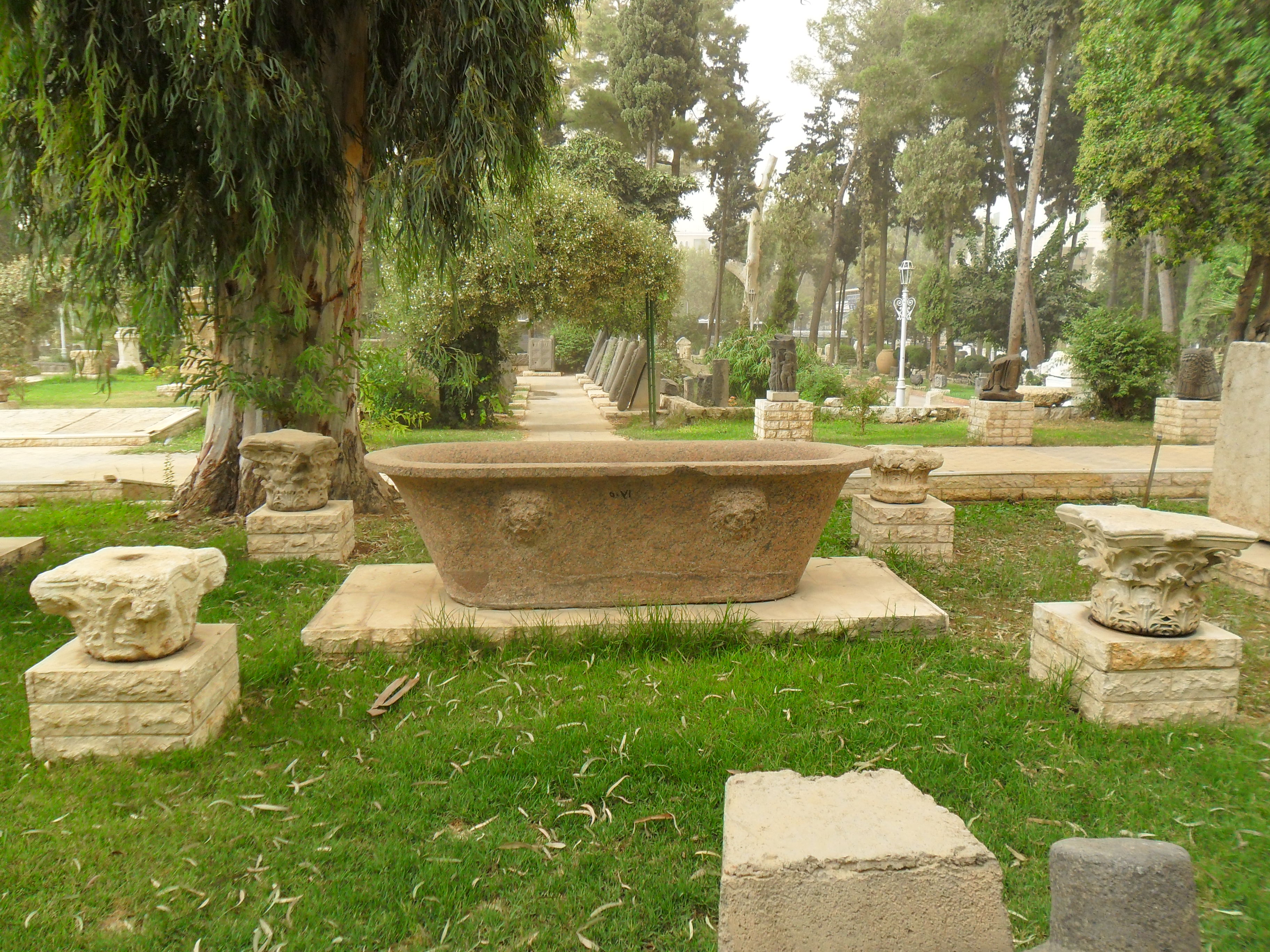
The museum's garden showcasing column capitals and an ancient tub

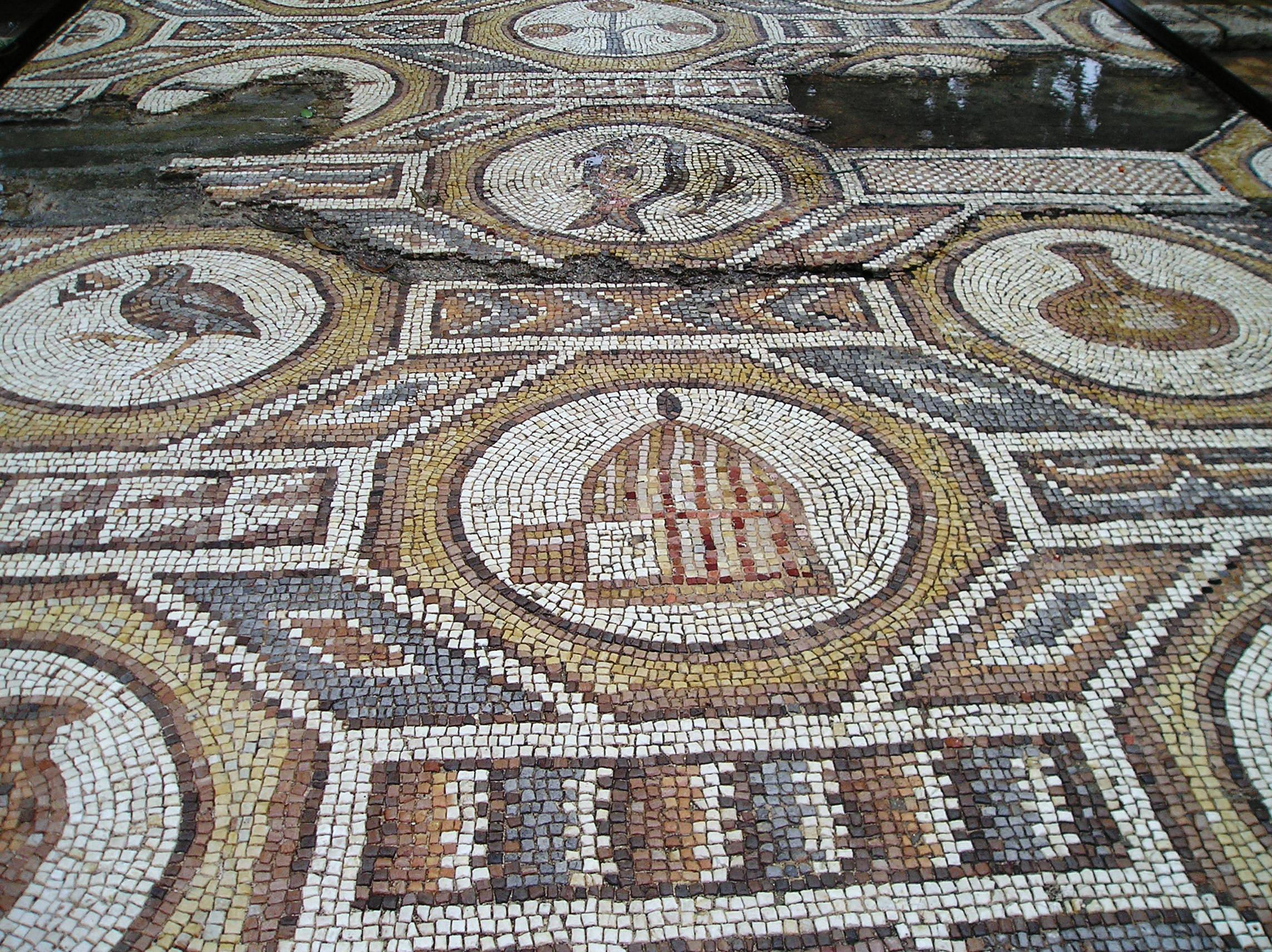
Detail of a Roman era mosaic

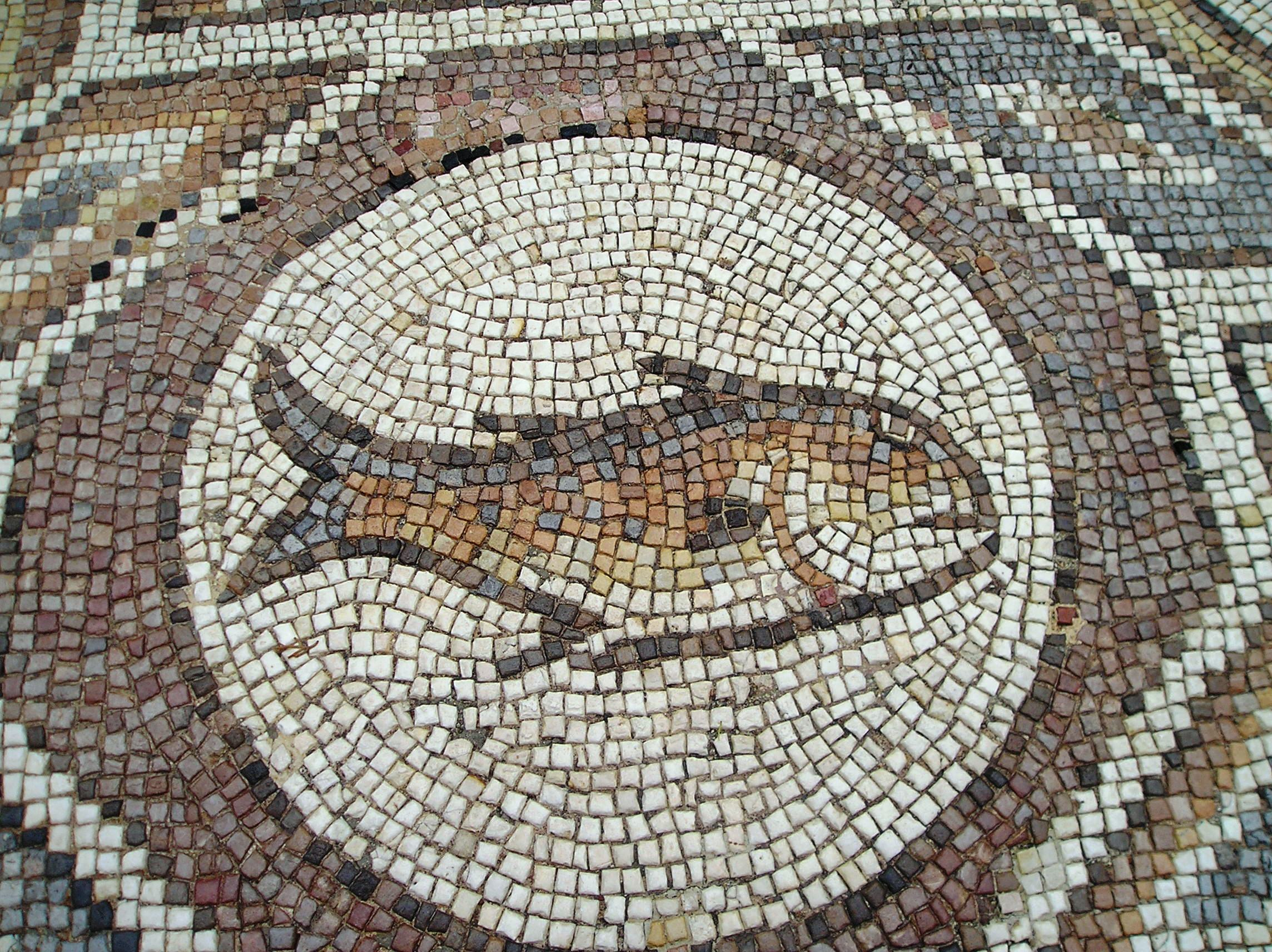
Detail of a Roman era mosaic

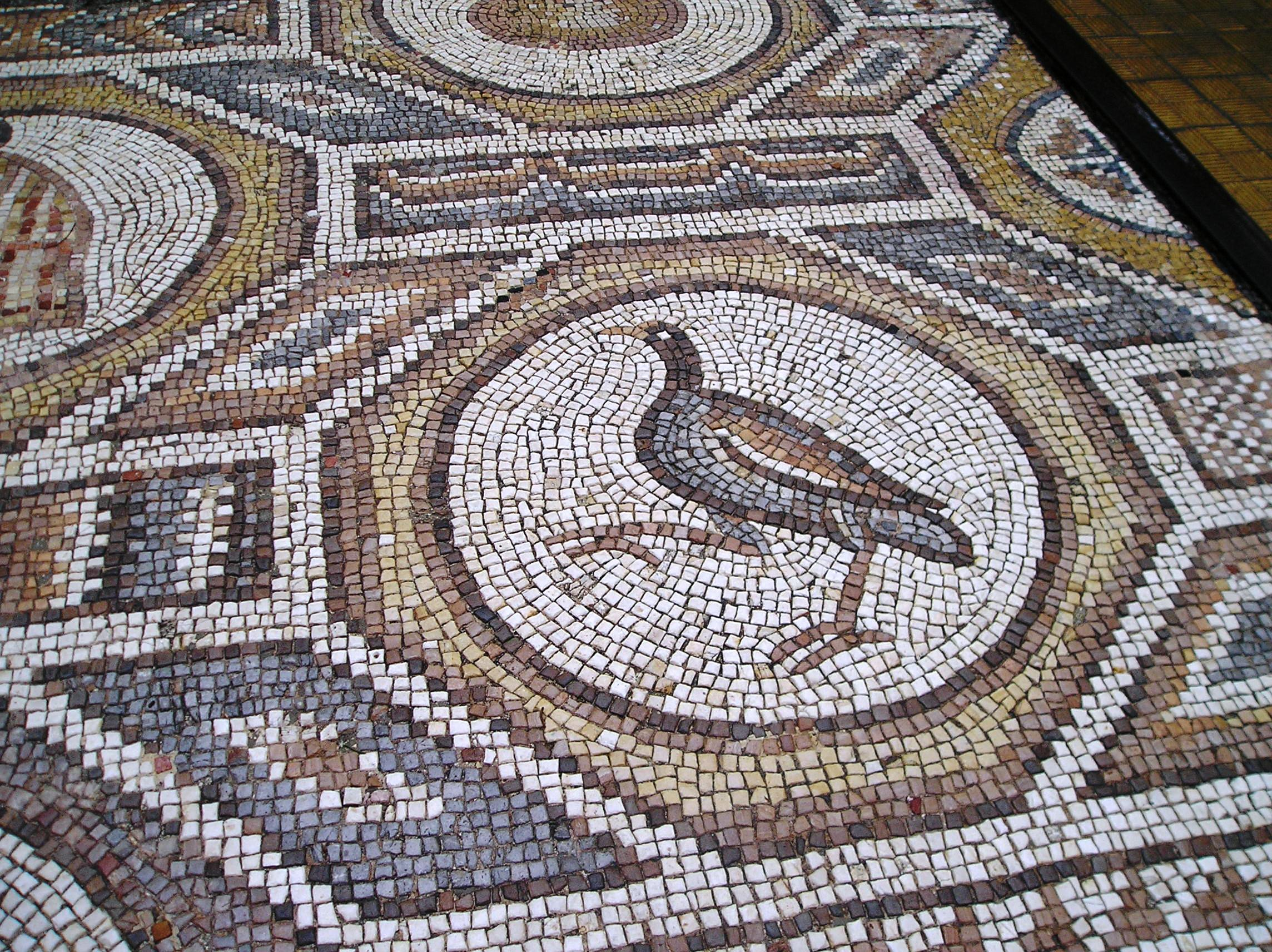
Detail of a Roman era mosaic

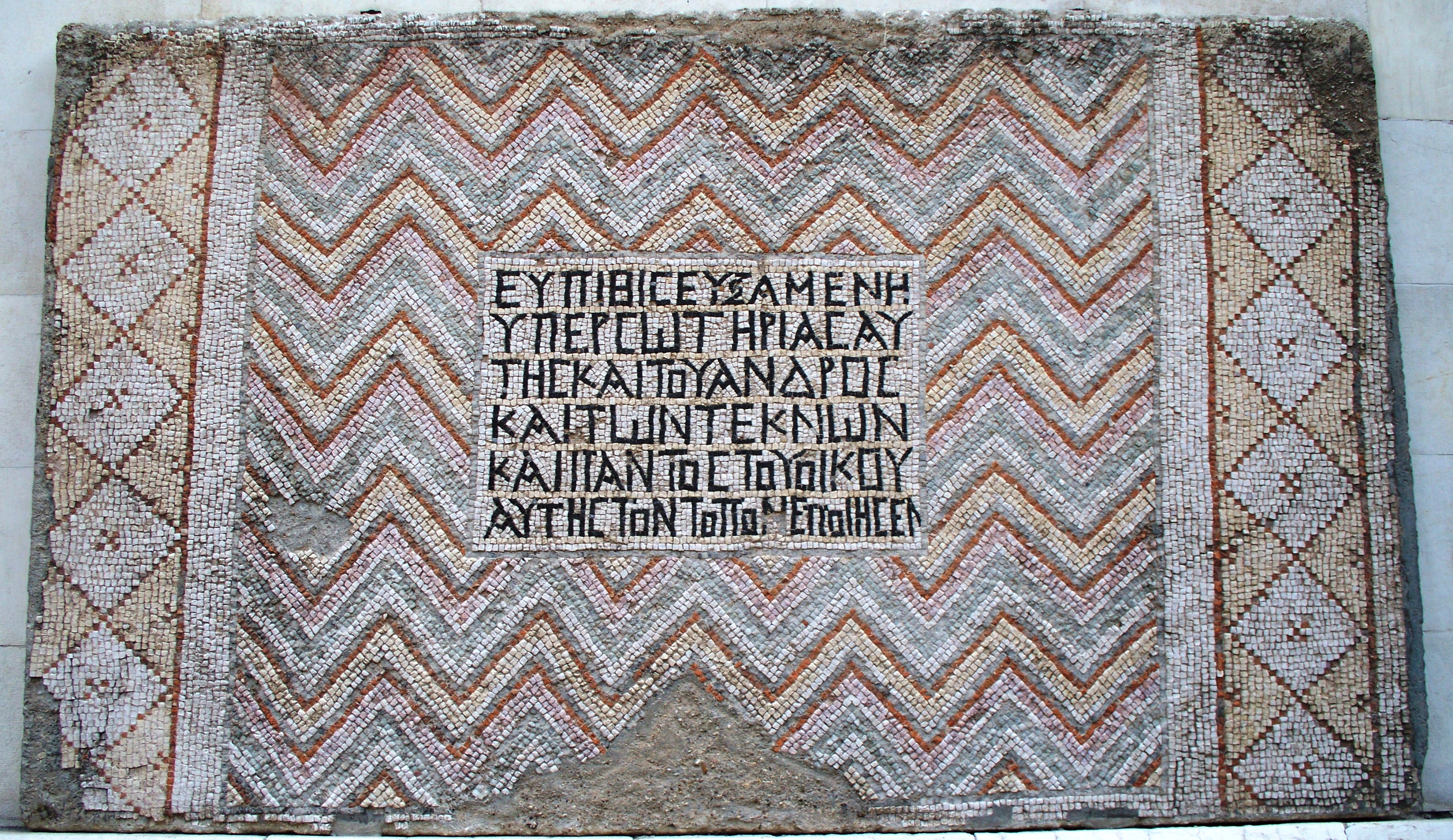
Inscription from a Greek era mosaic

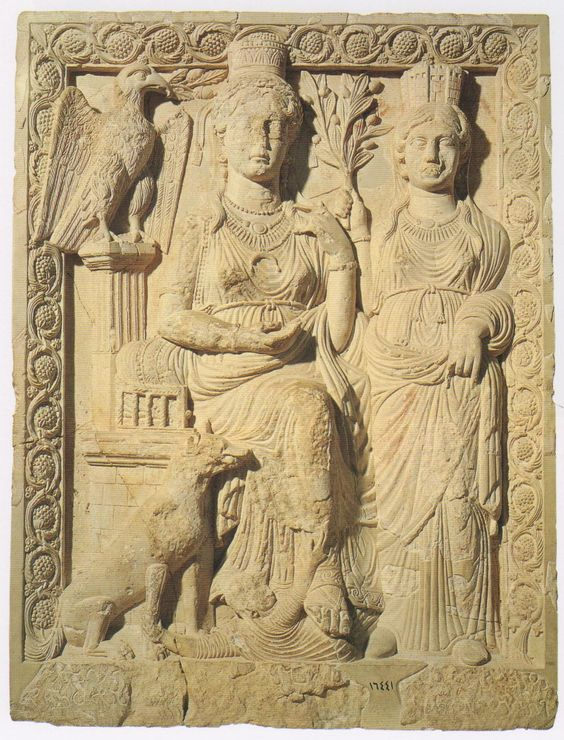
The Goddess Ishtar in a 3rd-century Palmyrene bas-relief

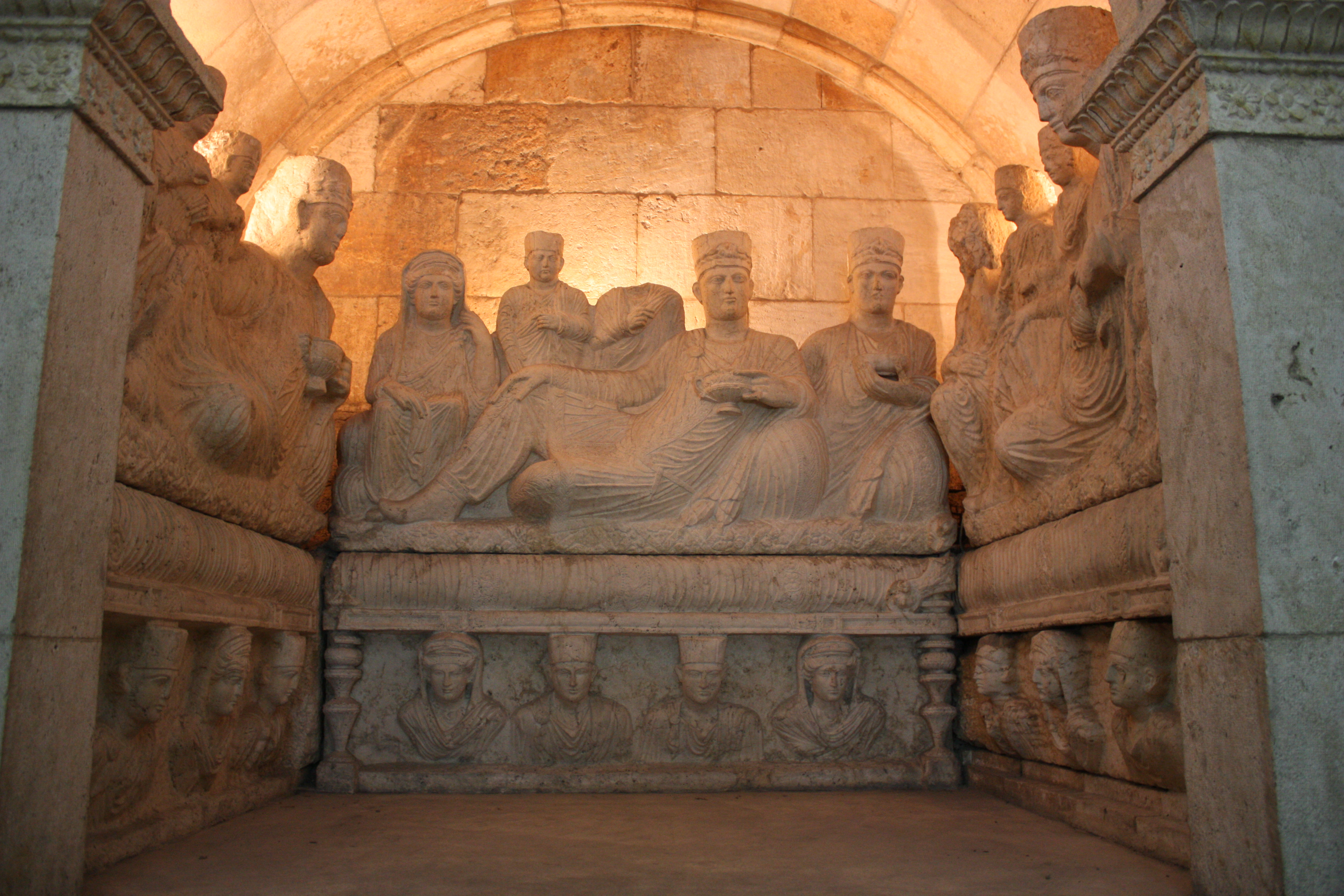
3rd century Palmyrene funerary sarcagrophi

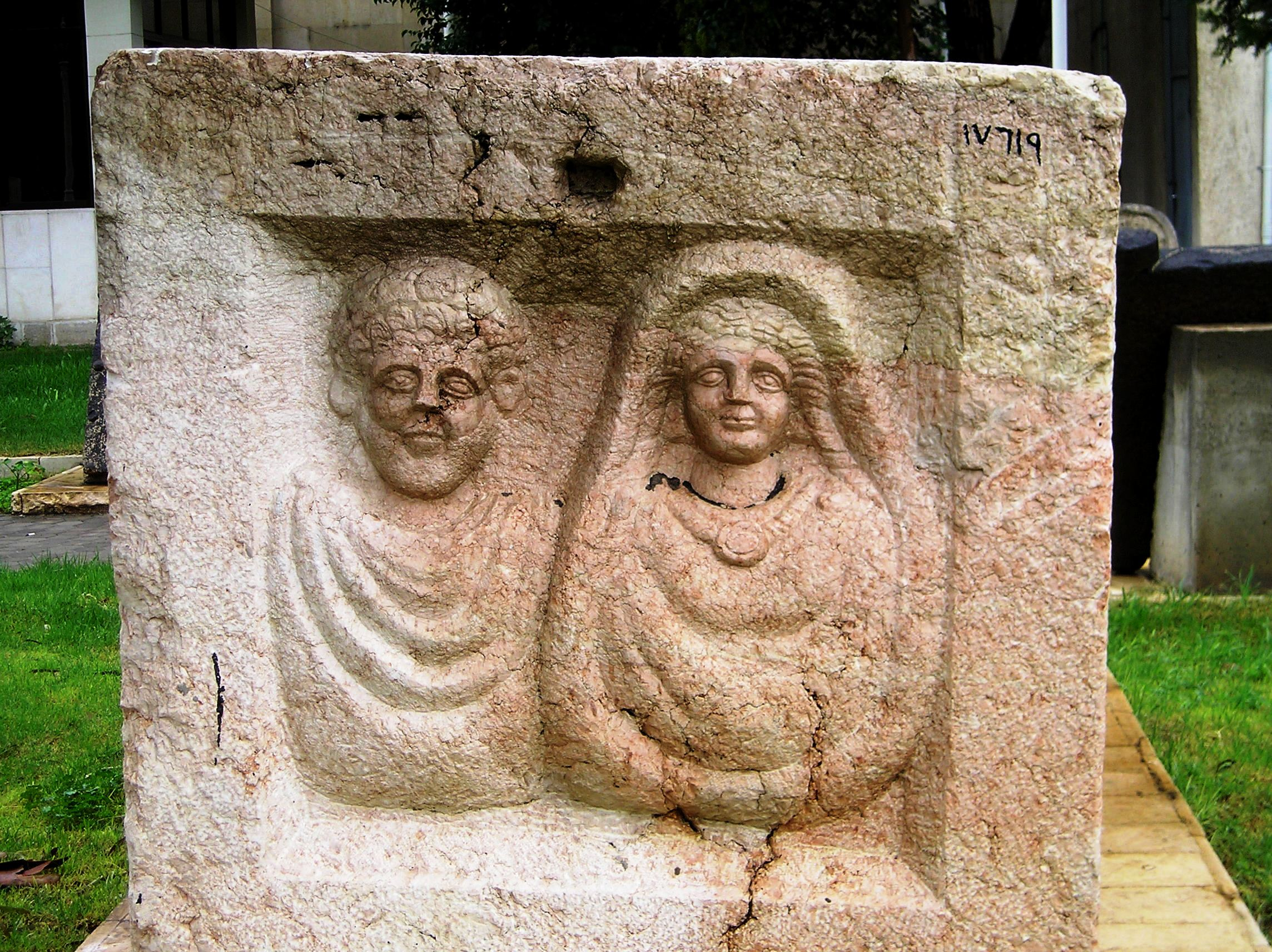
Roman era funerary relief of a couple

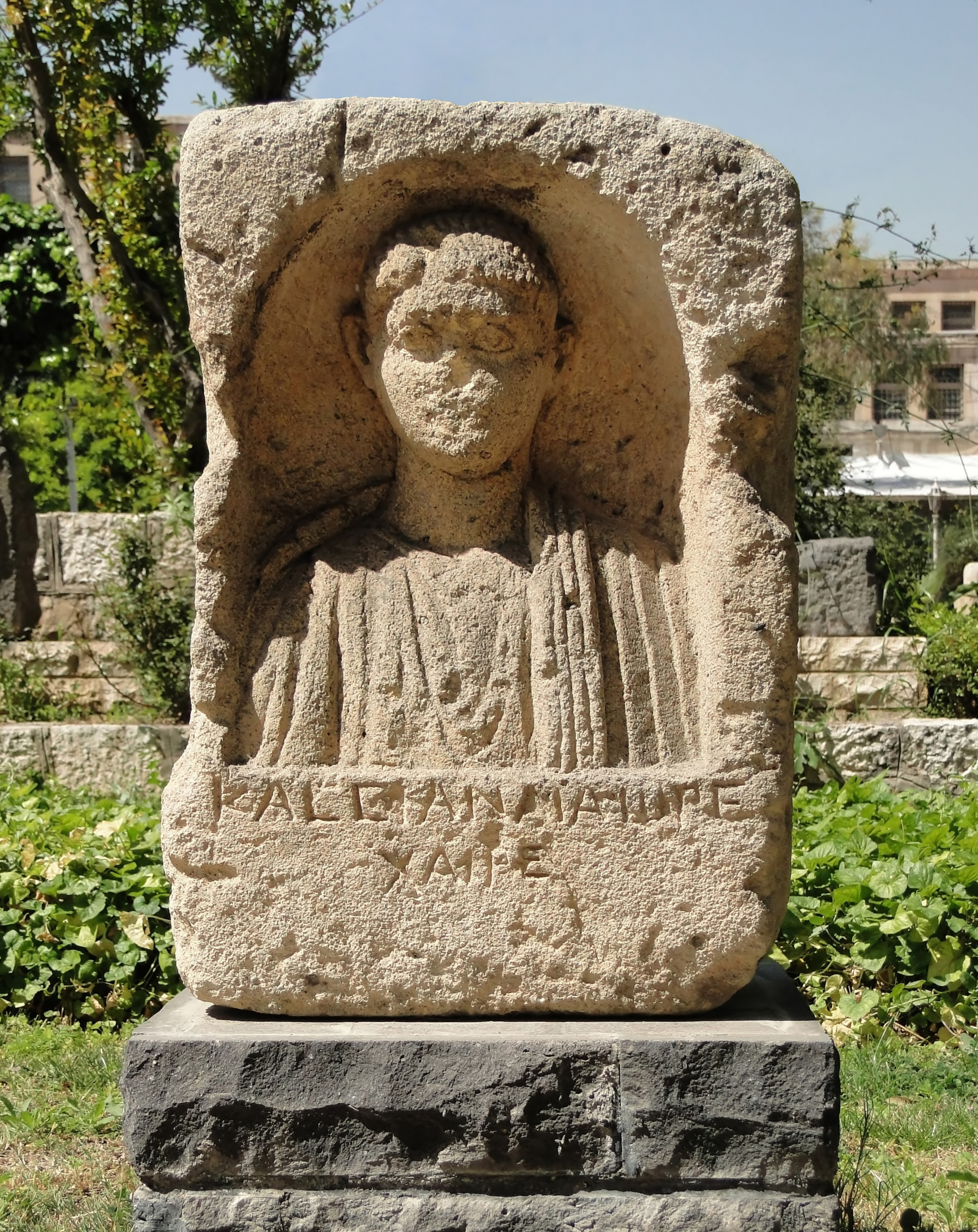
Roman era funerary relief of a man

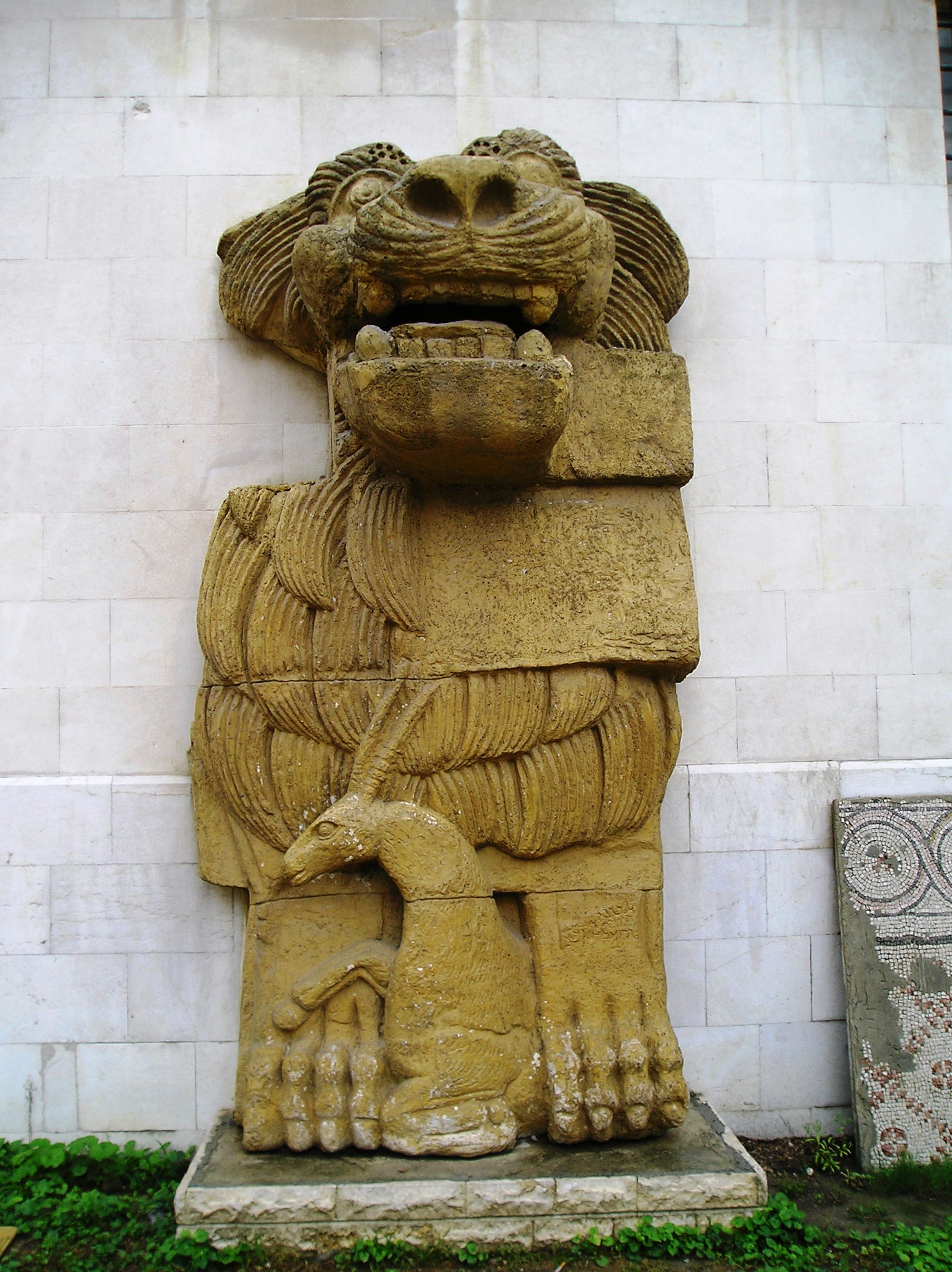
A Palmyrene Lion statue

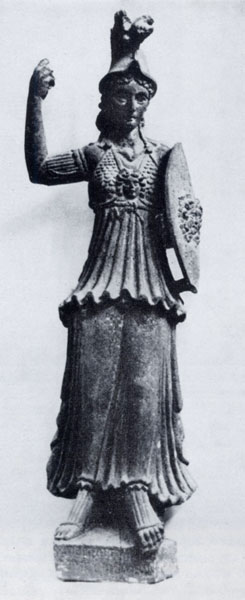
Basalt statue of the goddess Al-lāt-Minerva from As-Suwayda

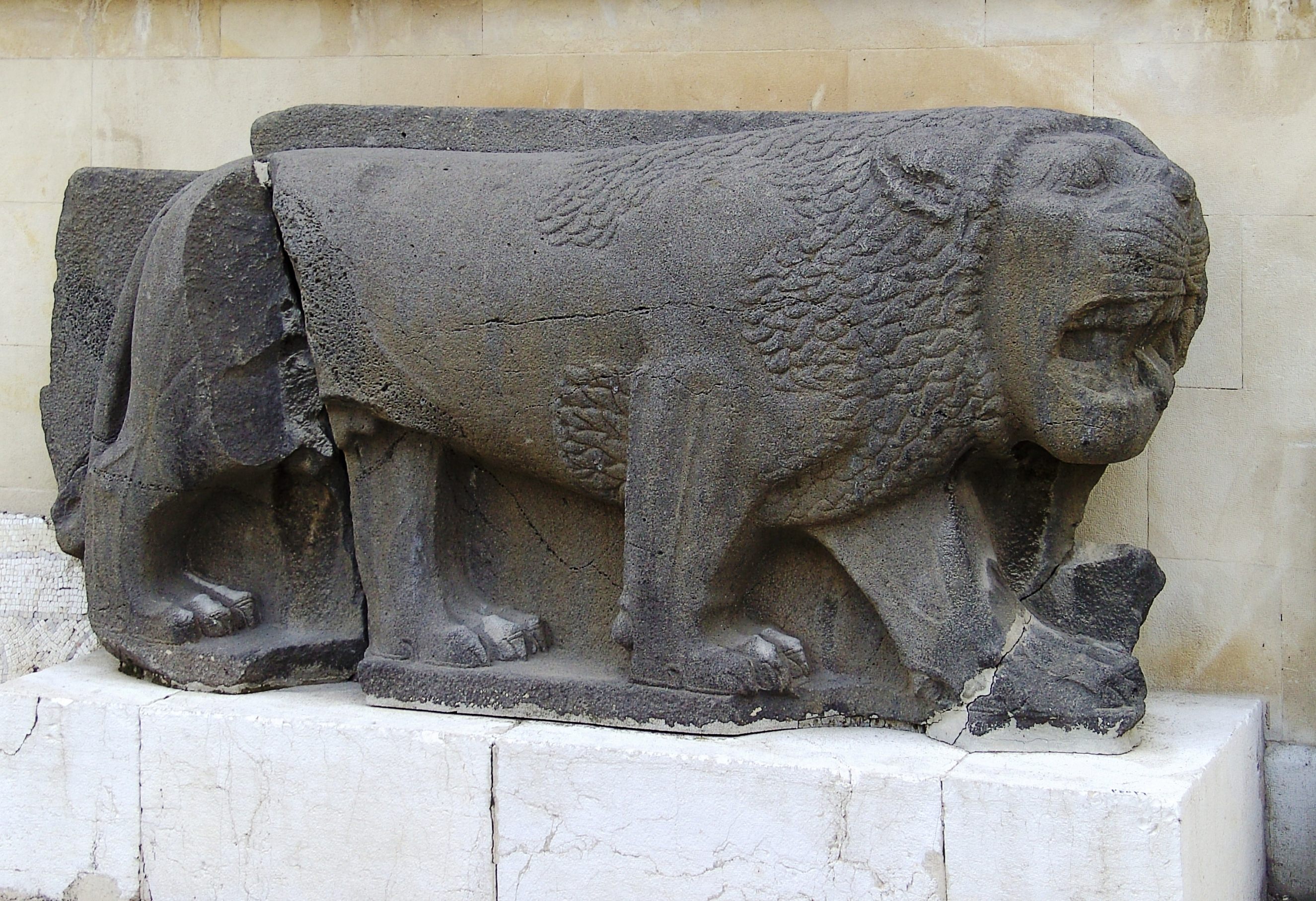
Hittite Lion statue

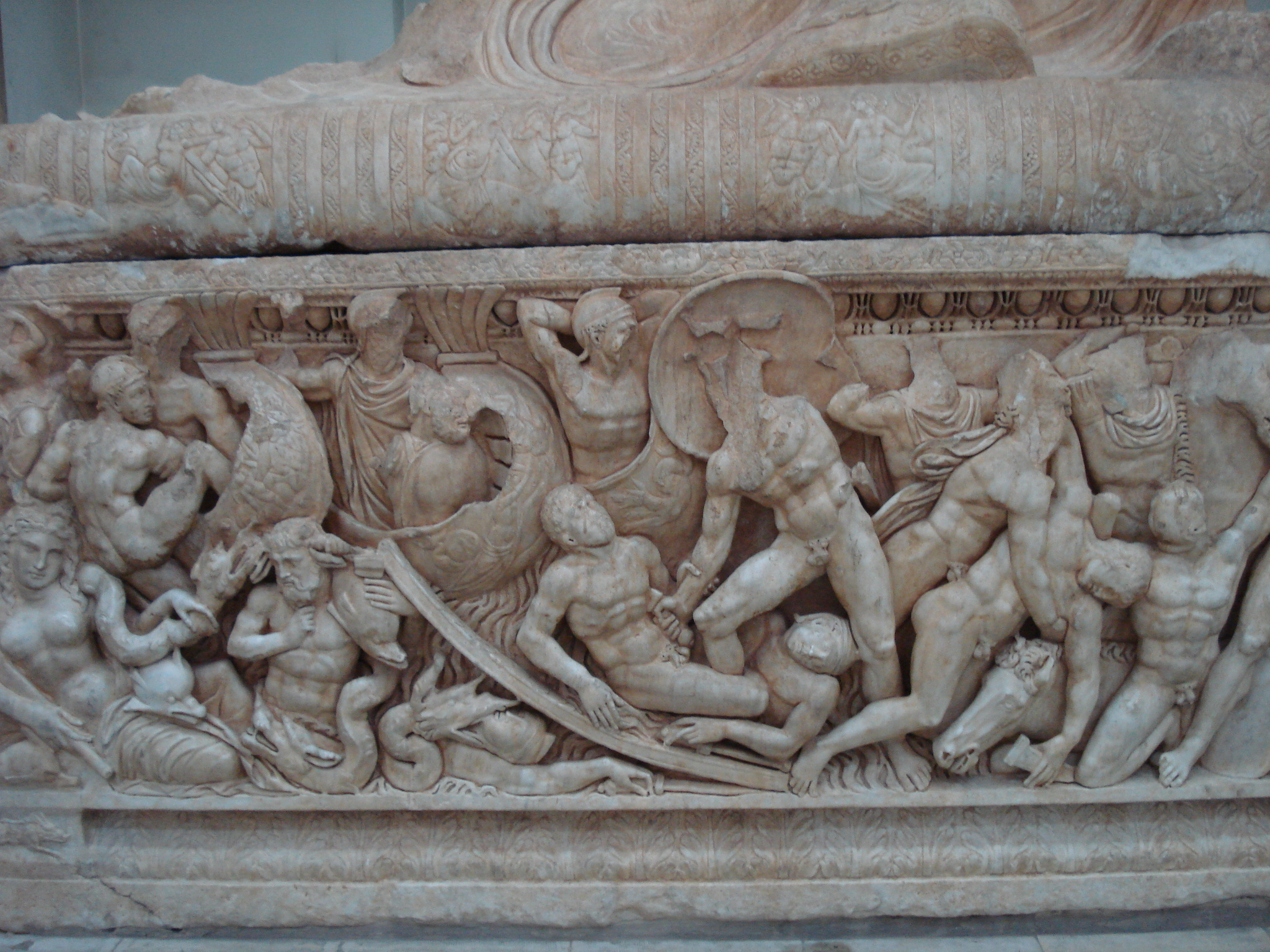
Roman sarcophagi with details of a battle

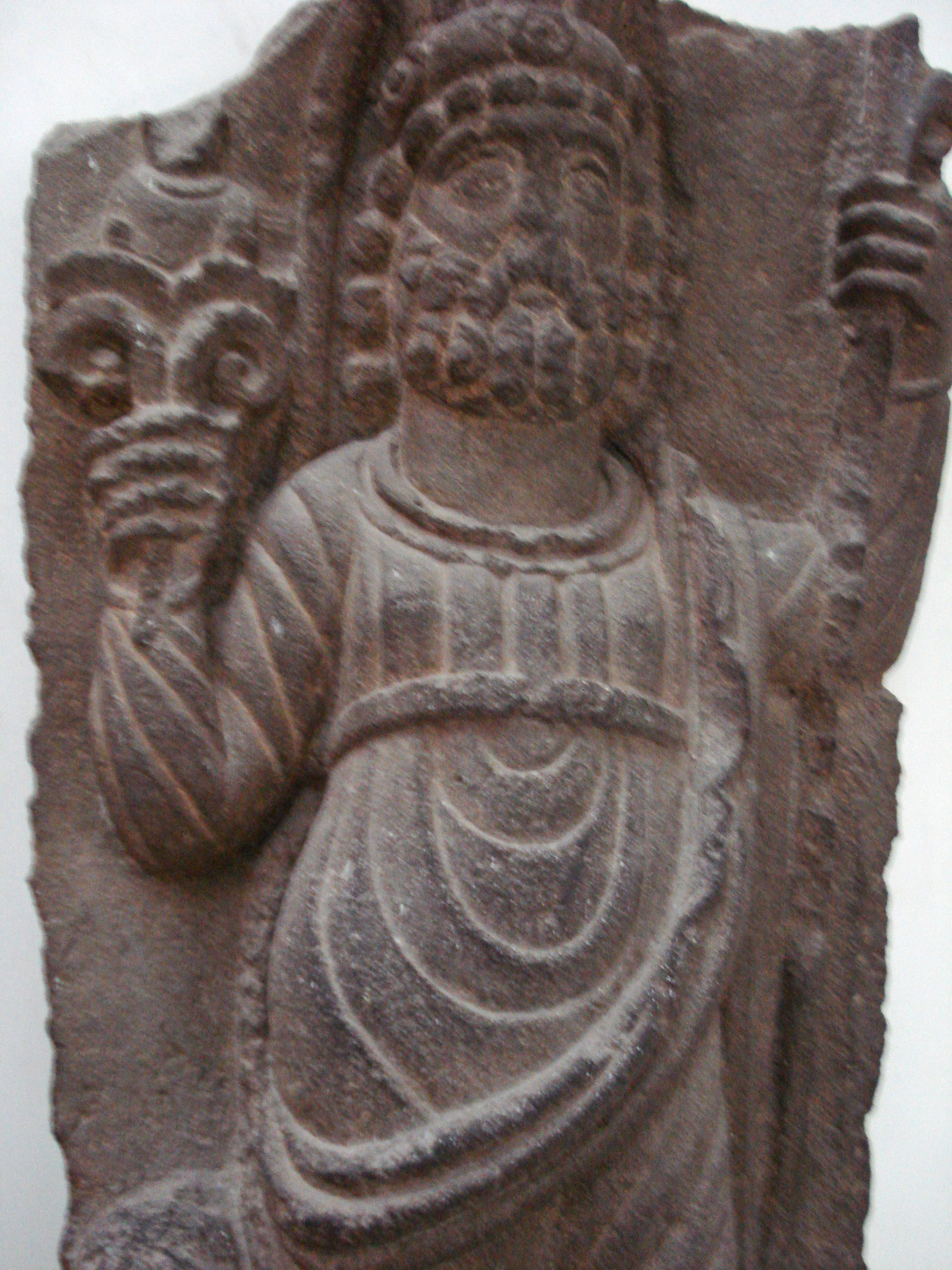
Statue of an ancient Nabatean god

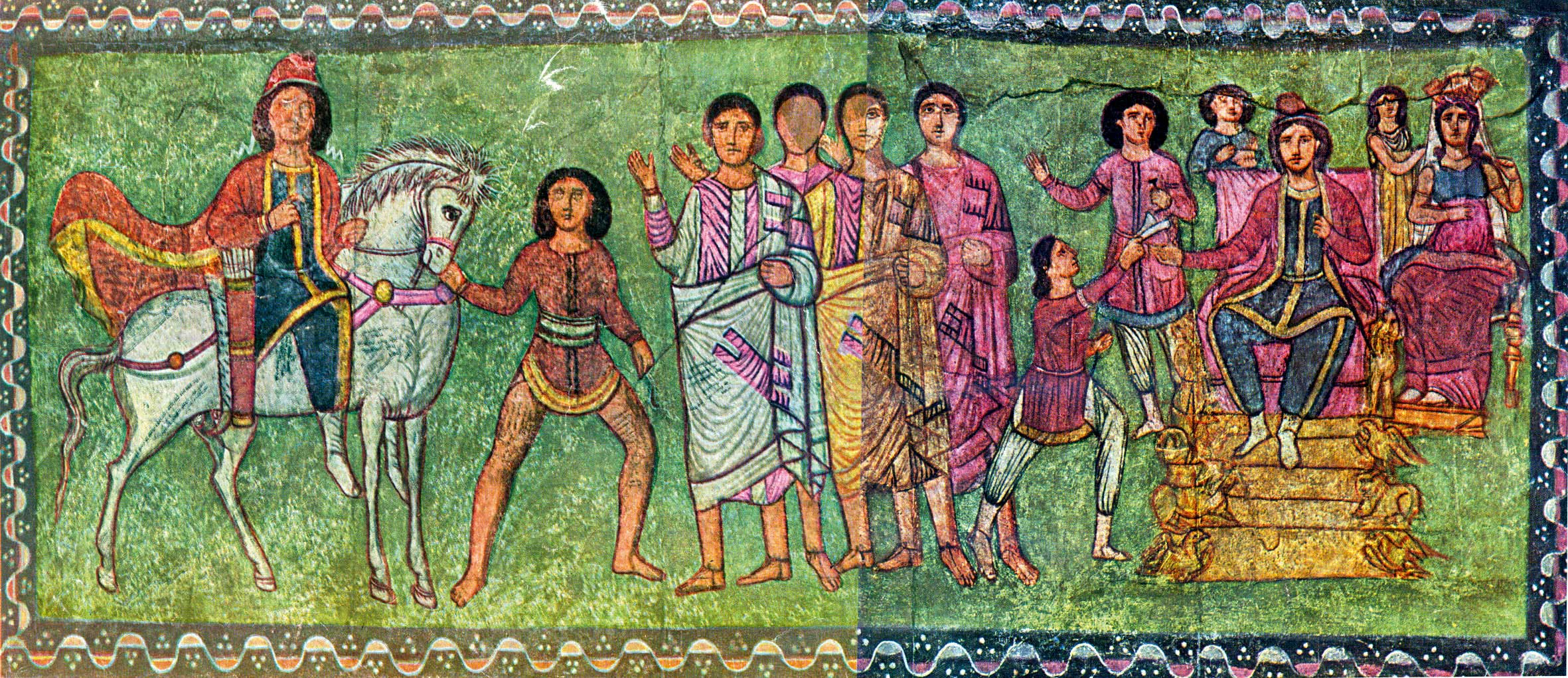
Wall painting from Dura Europos synagogue

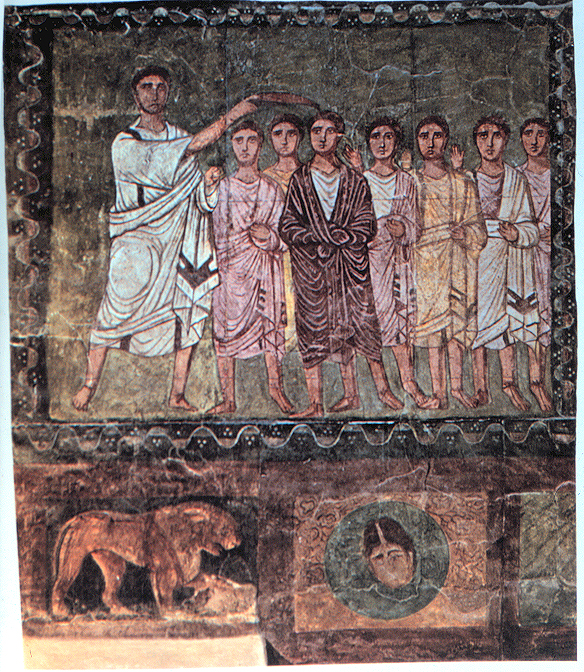
Wall painting from Dura Europos synagogue

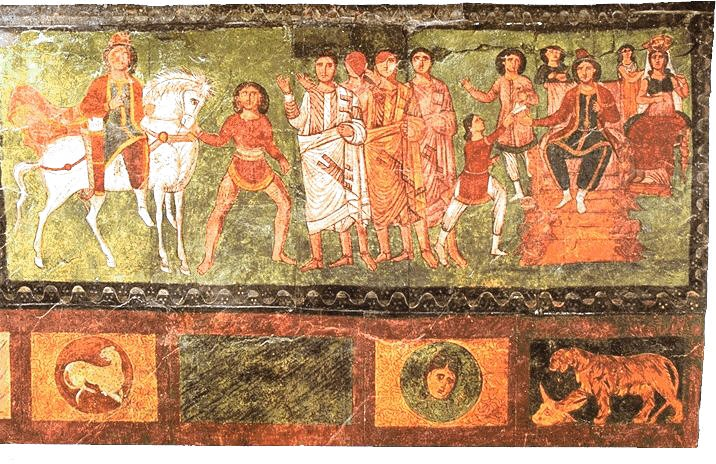
Wall painting from Dura Europos synagogue

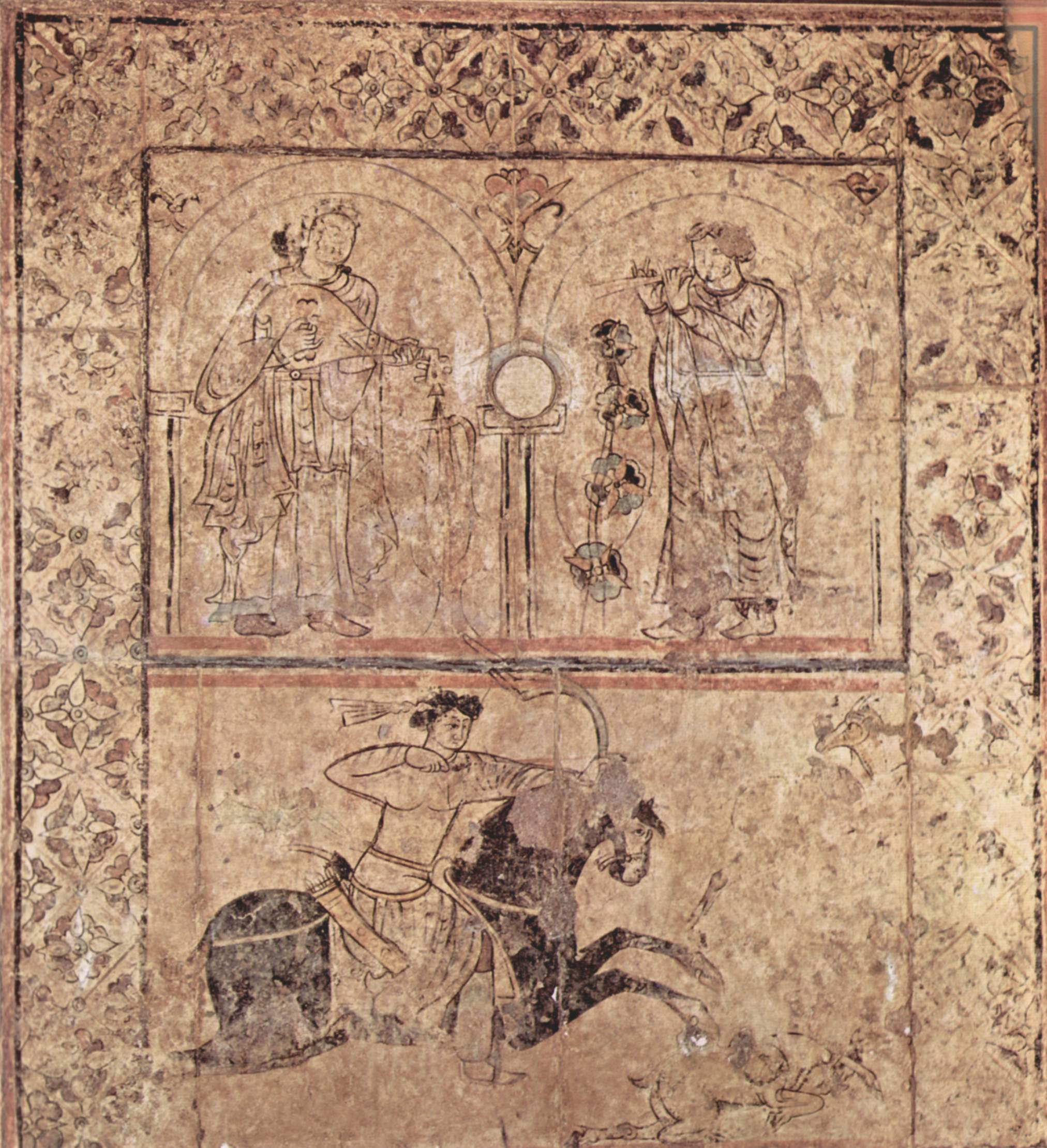
A fresco painting from the Umayyad era Qasr al-Hayr Al-Gharbi, 727 CE

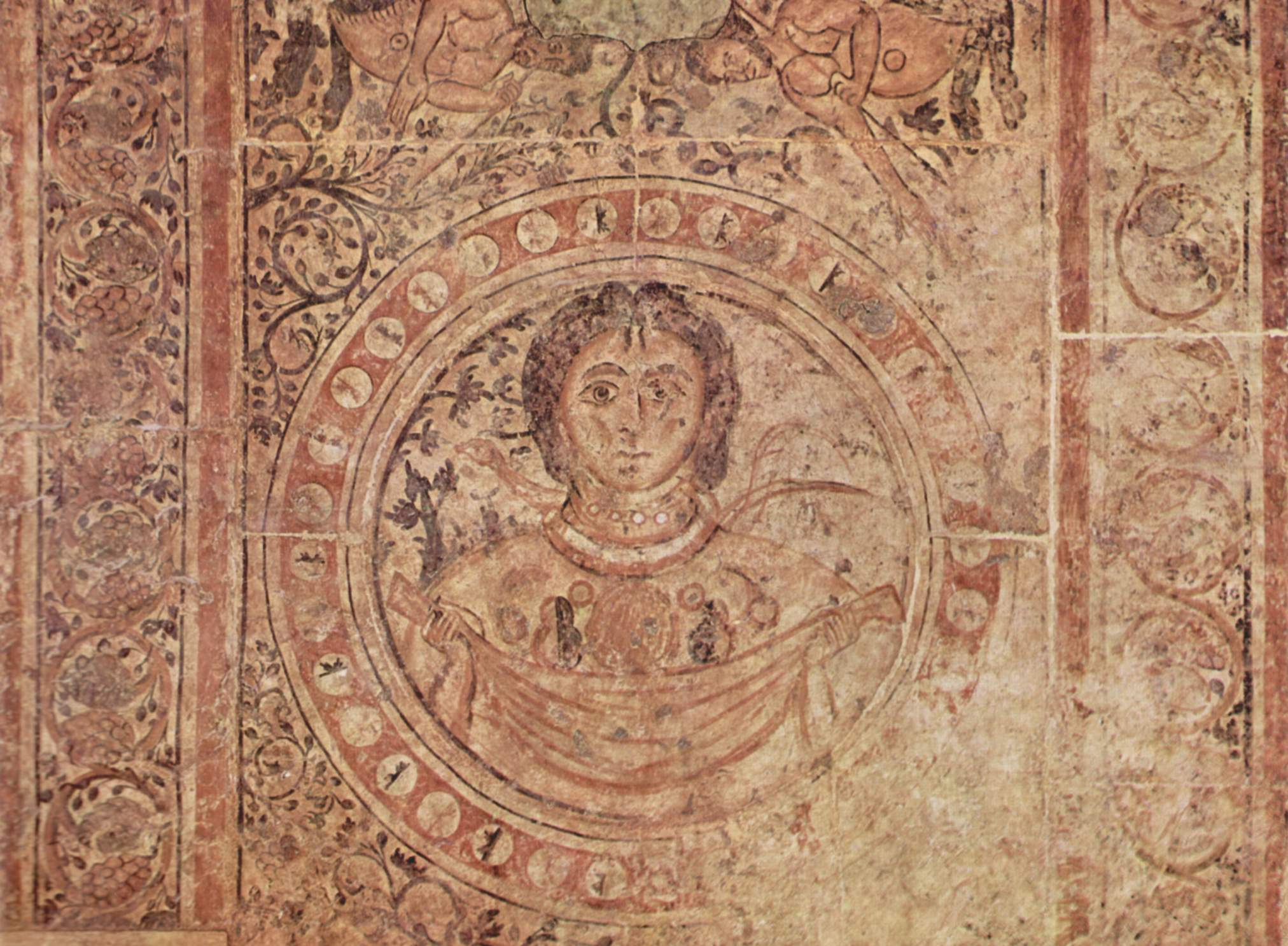
A fresco painting from the Umayyad era Qasr al-Hayr Al-Gharbi, 727 CE

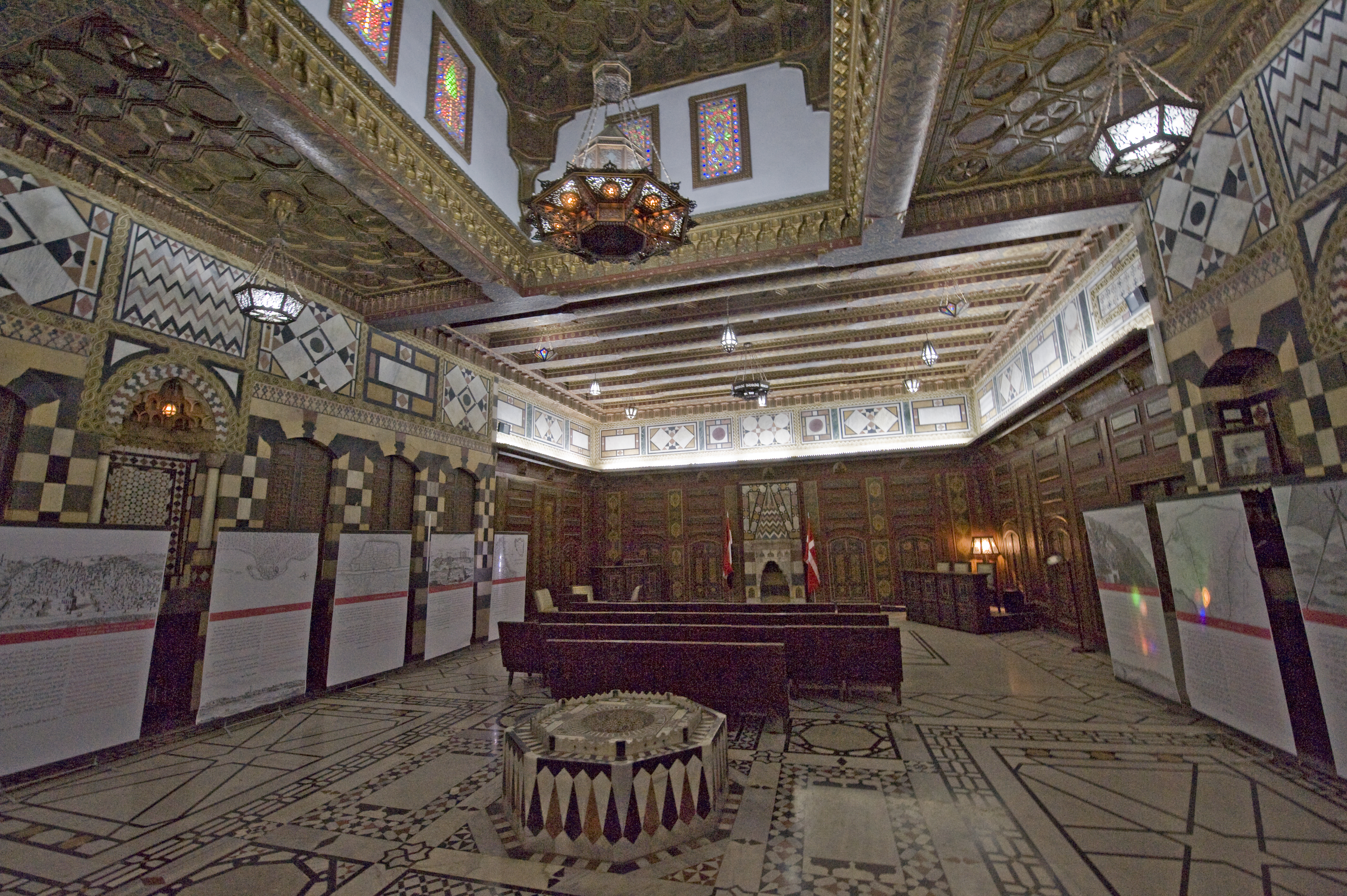
A Damascene 18th-century house that has been transferred to the museum

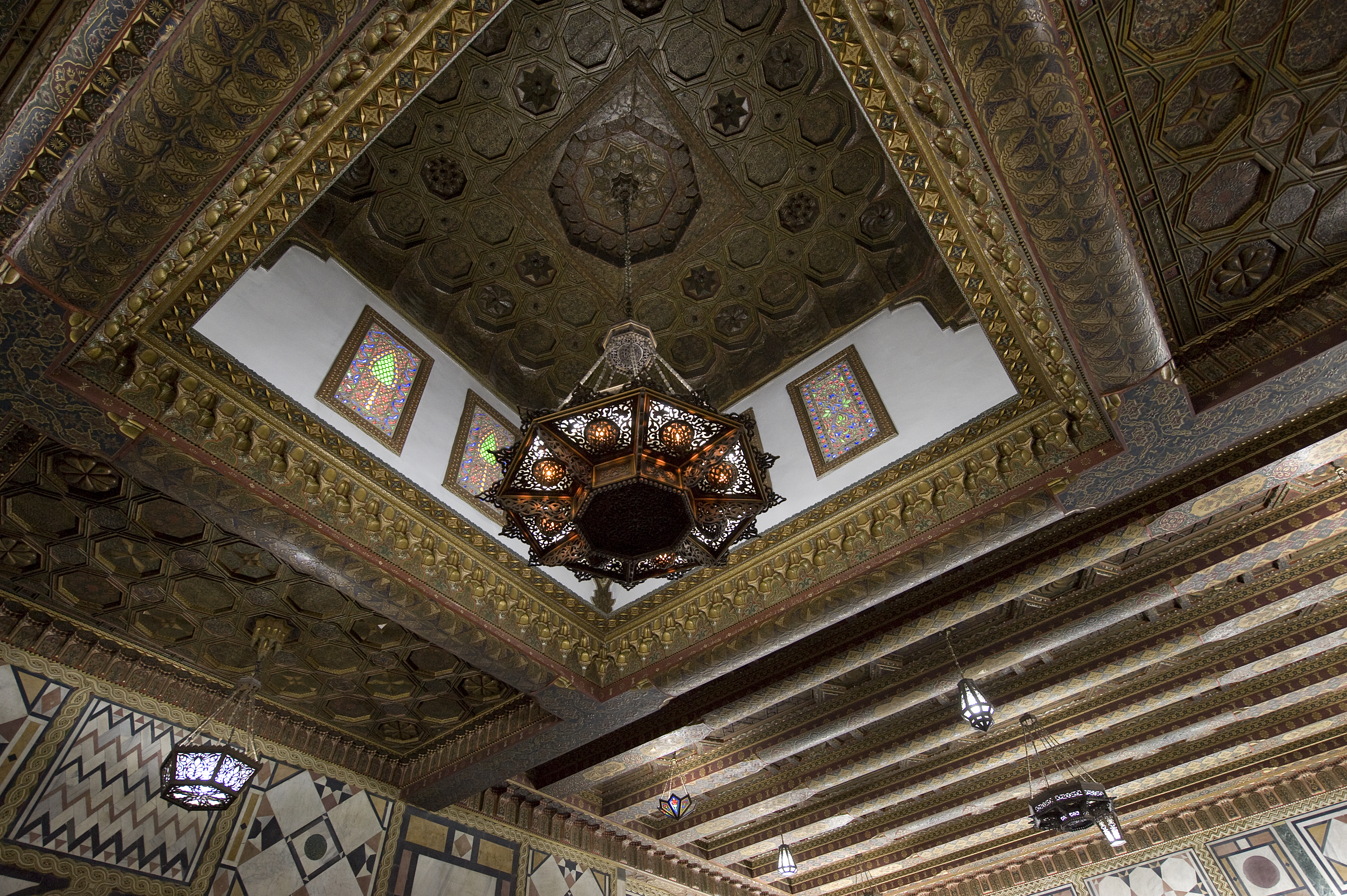
Roof of a Damascene house

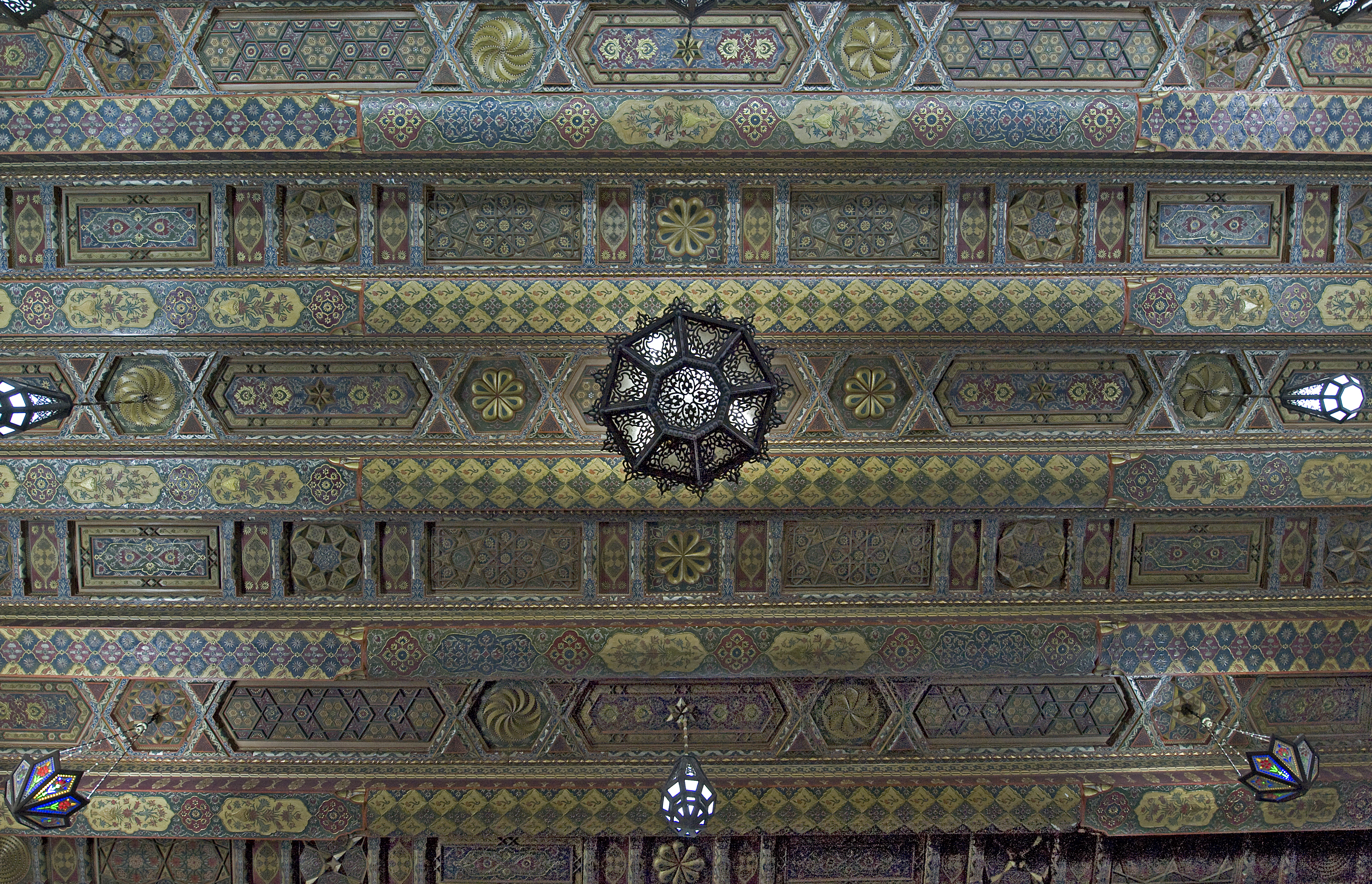
Roof of the Damascene house

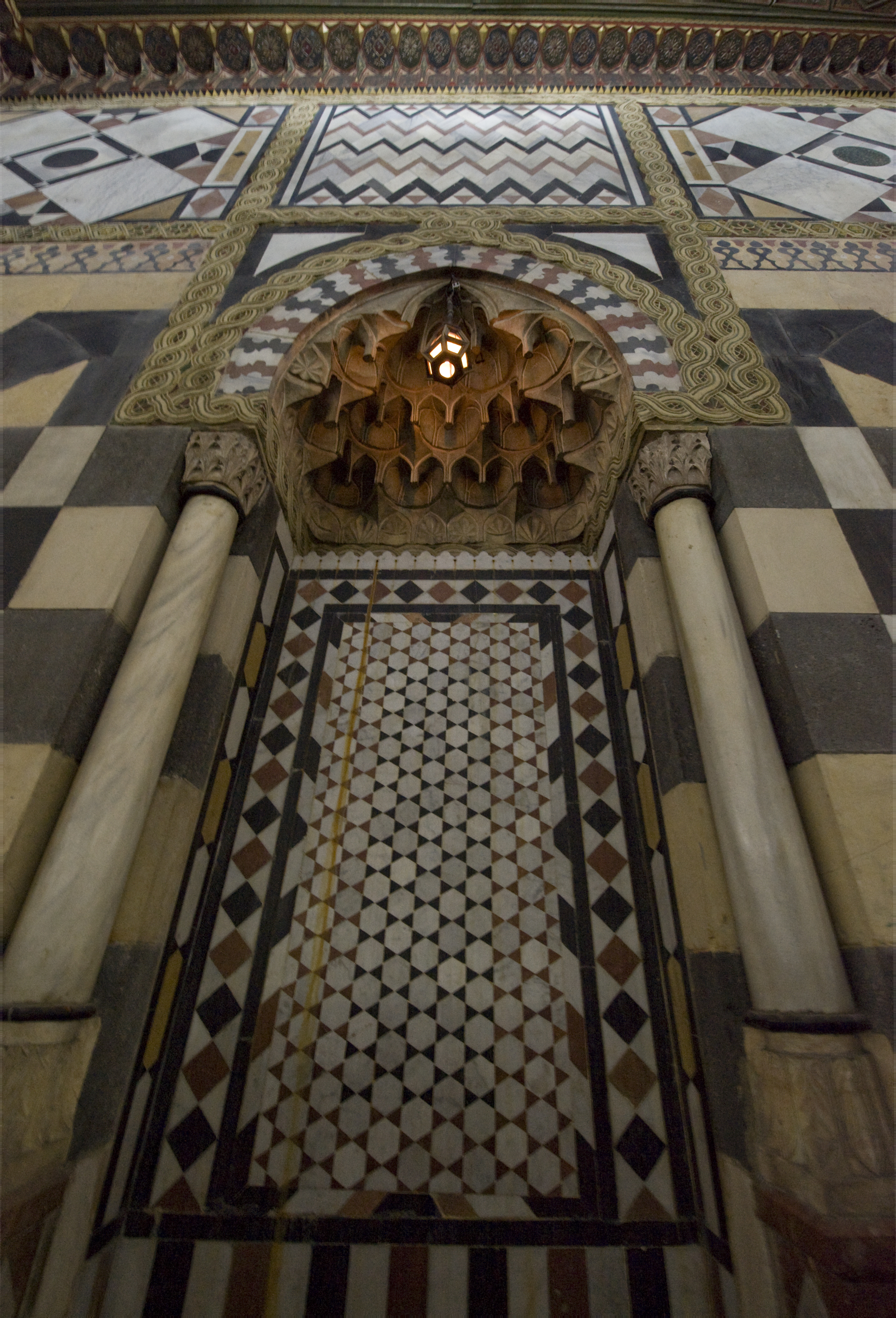
Mihrab from the Damascene house

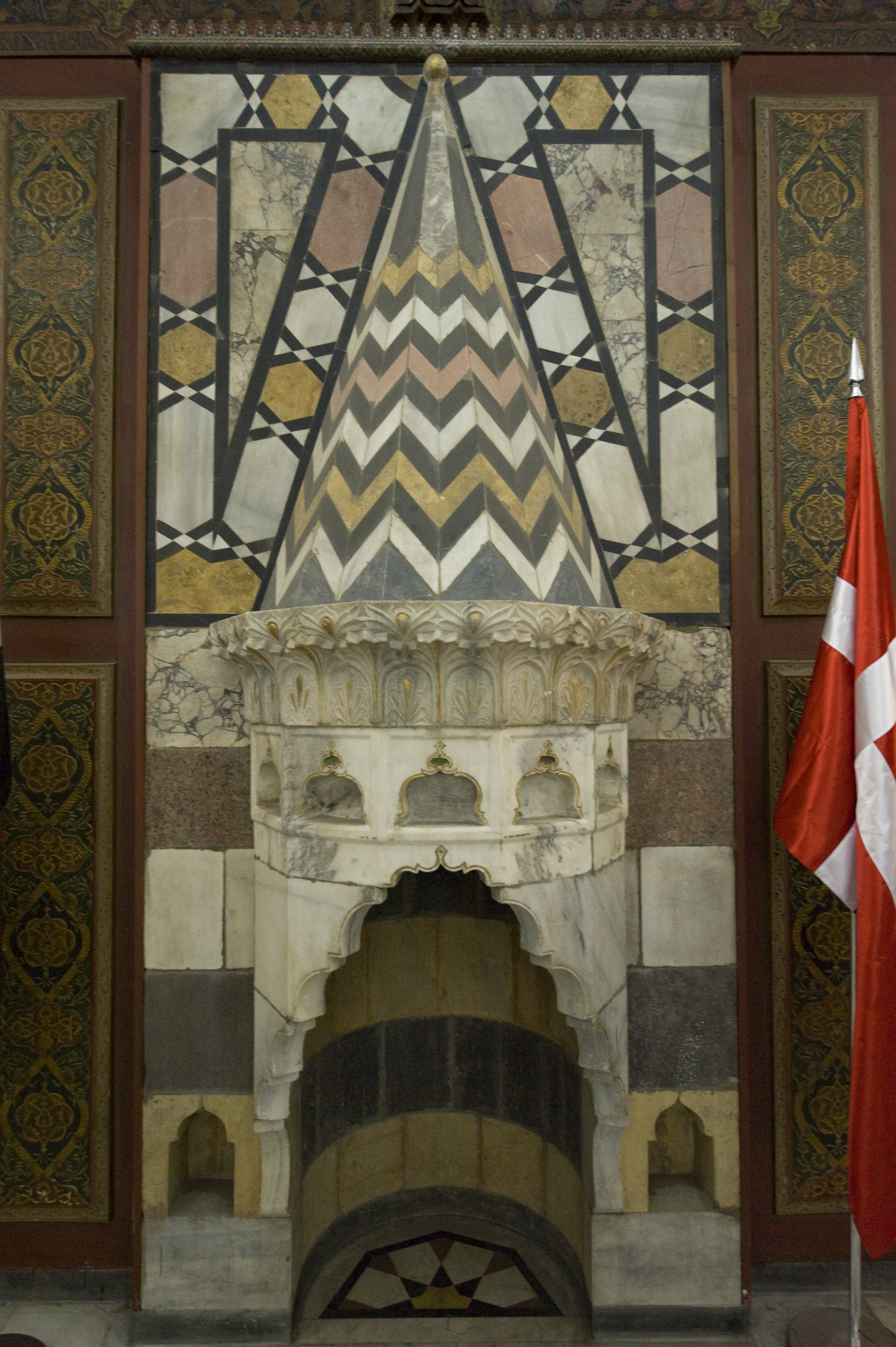
Fireplace of the Damascene house

== See also ==
- Deir ez-Zor Museum
- National Museum of Aleppo
- List of museums in Syria
