= Photography Biennale of the contemporary Arab world =

The Photography Biennale of the contemporary Arab world is a cultural event, established by the Arab World Institute and the Maison européenne de la photographie (European Photography Institute) whose aim is to develop a unique panorama of the contemporary photographers operating in – and on – the Arab world since the early 2000s.

== First edition ==
Curated by Gabriel Bauret, the first edition took place from 11 November 2016 to 17 January 2017 and aimed at showcasing a range of diverse images and points of view, between the Arab world and Europe.

The event took place in the 4th arrondissement of Paris, between the Arab World Institute and the Maison européenne de la photographie and six others places, such as the Cité internationale des arts in Paris, the city hall of the 4th arrondissement, Photo12 Galerie, Galerie Basia Embiricos, Galerie Boa and Graine de Photographe.

The next edition will be held in November 2017.

== Photographers represented ==
For this first edition, the Biennale presented works signed by about 50 artists.

Myriam Abdelaziz; Mohamed Abusal; Tamara Abdul Hadi; Jananne Al-Ani; Leila Alaoui; Farah Al Qasimi; Andrea & Magda; Zineb Andress Arraki; Daoud Aoulad-Syad; Maher Attar; Mustapha Azeroual	George Awde; Fayçal Baghriche; Bruno Barbey; Massimo Berruti; Pauline Beugniès; Nabil Boutros; Ihsane Chetuan; Christian Courrèges; Stéphane Couturier; Amélie Debray; Anne-Marie Filaire	Hicham Gardaf; Lamya Gargash; Samuel Gratacap; Tanya Habjouqa; Emy Kat; Joe Kesrouani; Yazan Khalili; Amine Landoulsi; Mohamed Lazare Djeddaoui; Diana Matar; Safaa Mazirh	Medhi Medacci; Amr Nabil; Malik Nejmi; Khalil Nemmaoui; Giulio Rimondi; Steve Sabella; Mouna Saboni; Wafaa Samir; Caroline Tabet

== Bibliography ==
- Première Biennale des photographes du monde arabe contemporain. Paris: Snoeck. 2015. ISBN 978-94-6161-262-5.
