= Awde =

Awde is a surname. Notable people with the surname include:

- Daniel Awde (born 1988), British runner and former decathlete
- George Awde (born 1980), American visual artist
- Nick Awde (born 1961), British writer, artist, singer-songwriter, and critic
