= Institut du monde arabe =

Cultural organization

Arab World Institute
- Institut du monde arabe معهد العالم العربي
- Established: 30 November 1987
- Location: 1 Rue des Fossés Saint-Bernard, 75005 Paris, France
- Coordinates: 48.8489°N 2.3572°E
- Type: foreign cultural institute
- Collections: Islamic Art
- Visitors: 411,715 (2017)
- Director: Anne-Claire Legendre
- President: Anne-Claire Legendre
- Public transit access: Jussieu; Cardinal Lemoine
- Website: imarabe.org

The Institut du monde arabe (French: [ɛ̃stity dy mɔ̃d aʁab], Arab World Institute; abbr. IMA) is an organisation founded in Paris in 1980 by France with 18 Arab countries to research and disseminate information about the Arab world and its cultural and spiritual values. The Institute was established as a result of a perceived lack of representation for the Arab world in France, and seeks to provide a secular location for the promotion of Arab civilisation, art, knowledge, and aesthetics. The building houses a museum, library, auditorium, restaurant, offices and meeting rooms.

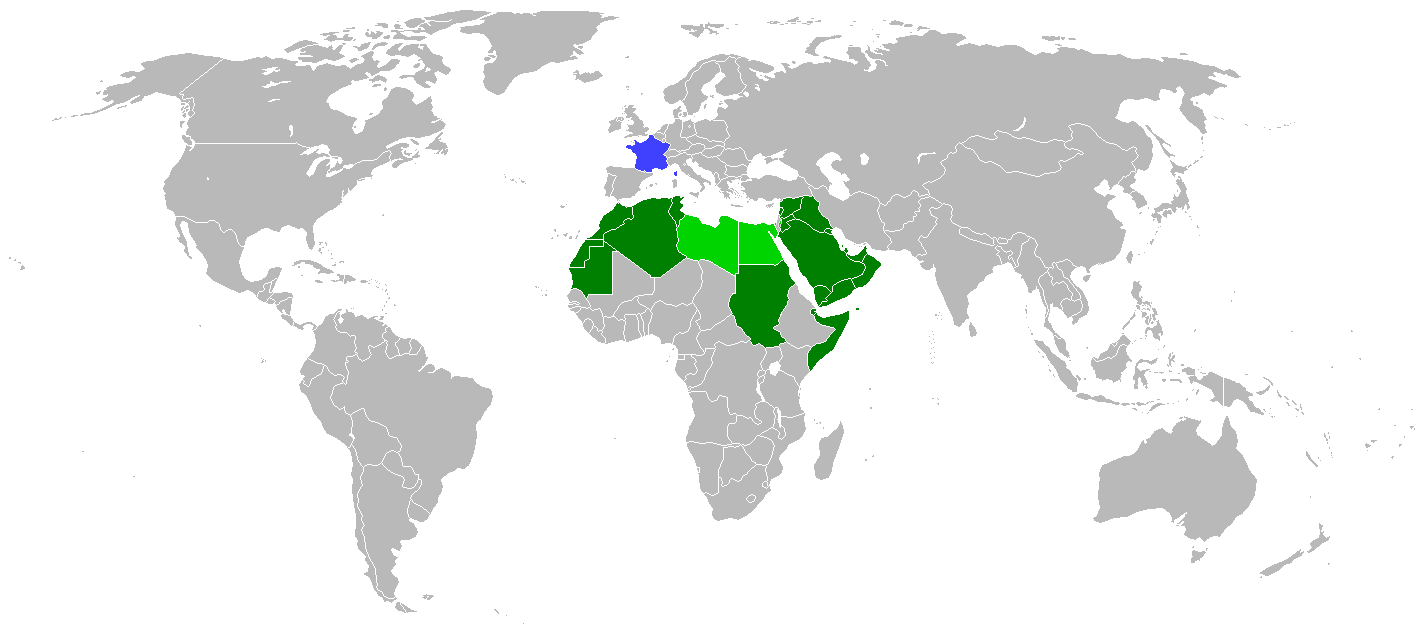
The members of the Arab World Institute

== History ==
The IMA is located in a building known as the Institut du Monde Arabe, the same name as the institute, on Rue des Fossés Saint Bernard in the 5th arrondissement of Paris, France. Originally, the project was conceived in 1973 by President Valéry Giscard d'Estaing. The museum was constructed between 1981 and 1987 under the presidency of François Mitterrand as part of his urban development series known as the Grands Projets. The Institute promotes cooperation and exchanges between France and the Arab nations, particularly in the areas of science and technology, contributing to the understanding between the Arab world and Europe. Libya joined the institute in 1984. The IMA was inaugurated on 30 November 1987 by President Mitterrand.

The IMA is a member of the Forum of Foreign Cultural Institutes in Paris and Exchanges and Radio Productions (EPRA). It is sometimes nicknamed the "Arab Beaubourg", in reference to the Georges Pompidou National Centre for Culture and Art, known as the Beaubourg Centre. The building was renovated between 2014 and 2017; during this time the library was closed, and it reopened to the public in March 2017.

In 2016, the IMA opened a branch in Tourcoing.

The director of the institute is French-Iraqi poet Chawki Abdelamir. French politician Jack Lang was president of the institute from 2013 until his resignation in 2026, after allegations of his financial ties to Jeffrey Epstein were reported. He was replaced by Anne-Claire Legendre, the first female president of the IMA.

== Architecture ==
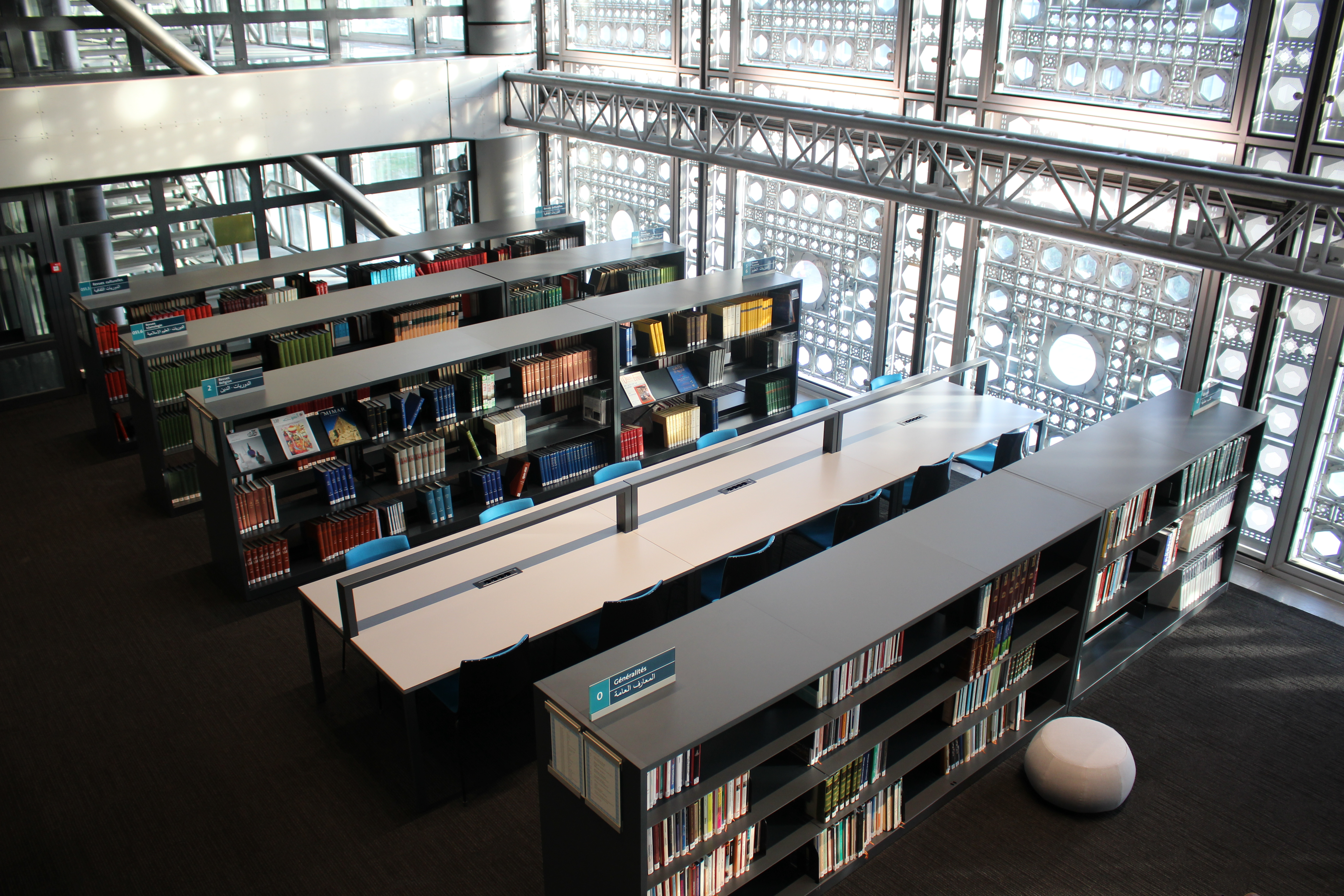
Impression of the metallic brise soleil seen from the inside out

The building was constructed from 1981 to 1987 and has floor space of 181,850 square feet (16,894 m^{2}). The Architecture-Studio together with Jean Nouvel, won the 1981 design competition. This project is a result of funds from both the League of Arab States and the French government, with the cost of the building totalling around €230,000,000. The building acts as a buffer zone between the Jussieu Campus of Pierre and Marie Curie University (Paris VI), built in large rationalist urban blocks, and the Seine. The river façade follows the curve of the waterway, reducing the hardness of a rectangular grid and offering an inviting view from the Sully Bridge. At the same time the building appears to fold itself back in the direction of the Saint-Germain-des-Prés district.

In contrast to the curved surface on the river side, the southwest façade is an uncompromisingly rectangular glass-clad curtain wall. It faces a large square public space that opens in the direction of the Île de la Cité and Notre Dame. Visible behind the glass wall, a metallic screen unfolds with moving geometric motifs. The motifs are actually 240 photo-sensitive motor-controlled apertures, or shutters, which act as a sophisticated brise soleil that automatically opens and closes to control the amount of light and heat entering the building from the sun. The mechanism creates interior spaces with filtered light — an effect often used in Islamic architecture with its climate-oriented strategies. The innovative use of technology and success of the building's design catapulted Nouvel to fame and is one of the cultural reference points of Paris.

The building was the recipient of the 1989 Aga Khan Award for Architectural Excellence. Jury members included historian Oleg Grabar.

== Presidents ==
- Jean Basdevant (1979–1980)
- Philippe Ardant (1980–1985)
- Pierre Guidoni (1985–1986)
- Paul Carton (1986–1988)
- Edgard Pisani (1988–1995)
- Camille Cabana (1995–2002)
- Denis Bauchard (2002–2004)
- Yves Guéna (2004–2007)
- Dominique Baudis (2007–2009)
- Dominique Baudis and Bruno Levallois (2009–2011)
- Renaud Muselier and Bruno Levallois (2011–2013)
- Jack Lang (2013–2026)
- Anne-Claire Legendre (2026–present)

== Museum ==
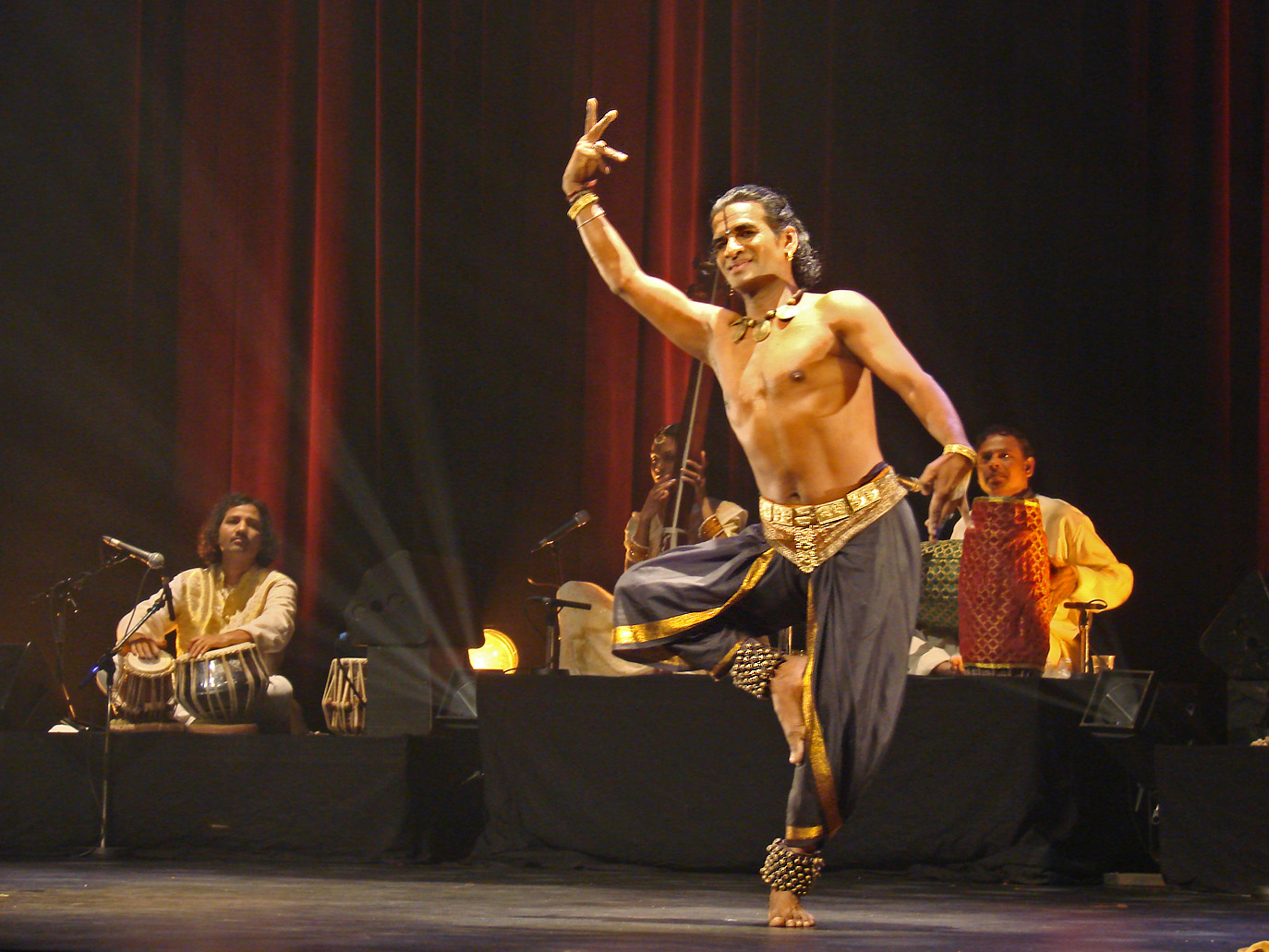
Raghunath Manet performing at the IMA in 2008

Within the museum are objects from the Arab world ranging from before Islam through into the twentieth century. One of the main initiatives within the museum is the inclusion of special exhibitions.

=== Special exhibitions ===
- 1991 Fahrelnissa Zeid as part of the Trois Femmes Peintres exhibition.

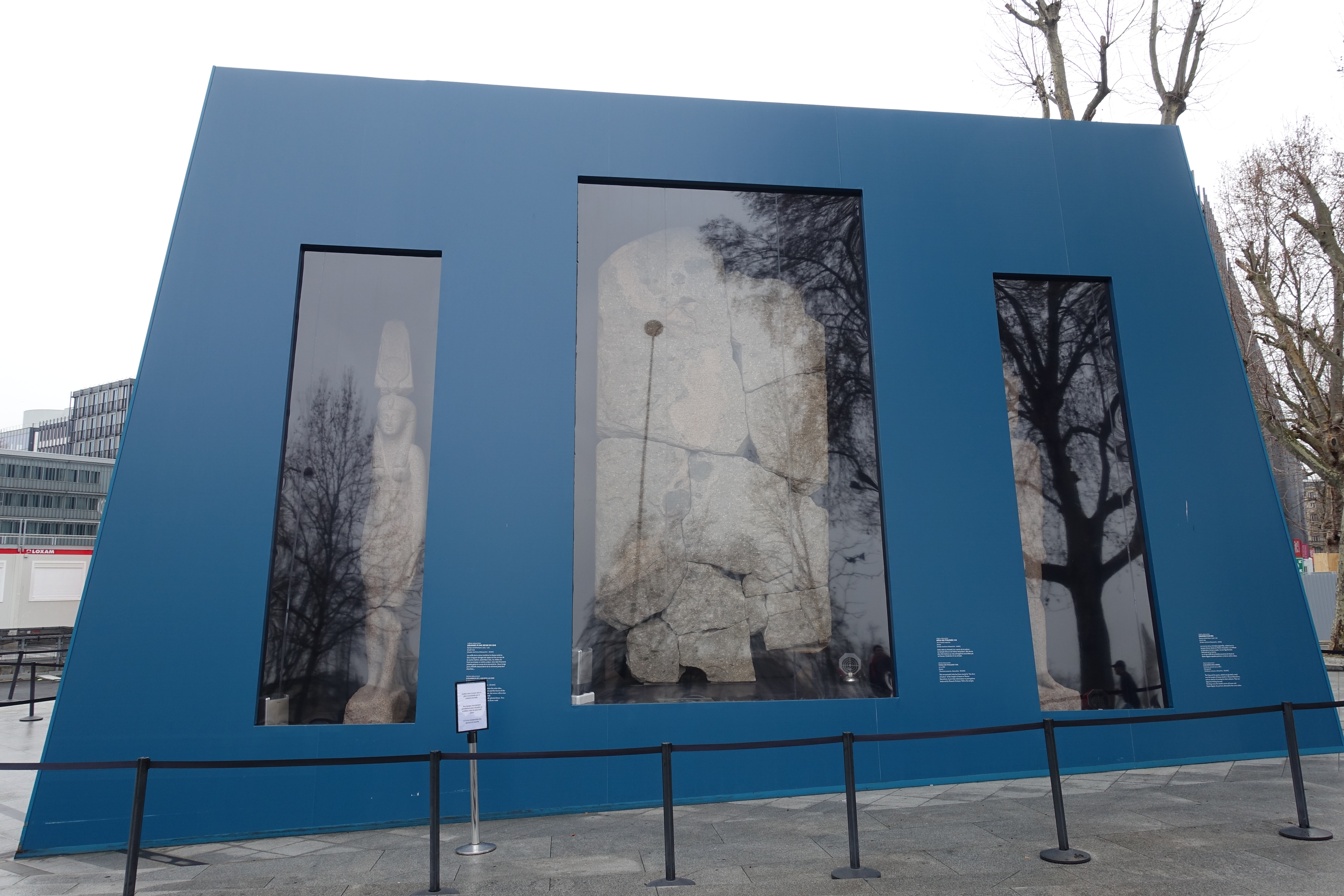
View of special exhibition, Osiris: the submerged mysteries of Egypt. Fall/2015 - Spring/2016

- 2016
  - Osiris: The Submerged Mysteries of Egypt
  - Voices of animals: the fables of Kalila and Dimna
  - Nomadic Sculpture by Rodolphe Hammadi
  - First Photography Biennale of the contemporary Arab world
  - CoeXist
- 2017
  - 'Masterpieces of Modern and Contemporary Arab Art' by the Barjeel Art Foundation
- 2025
  - Saved Treasures of Gaza: 5000 Years of History

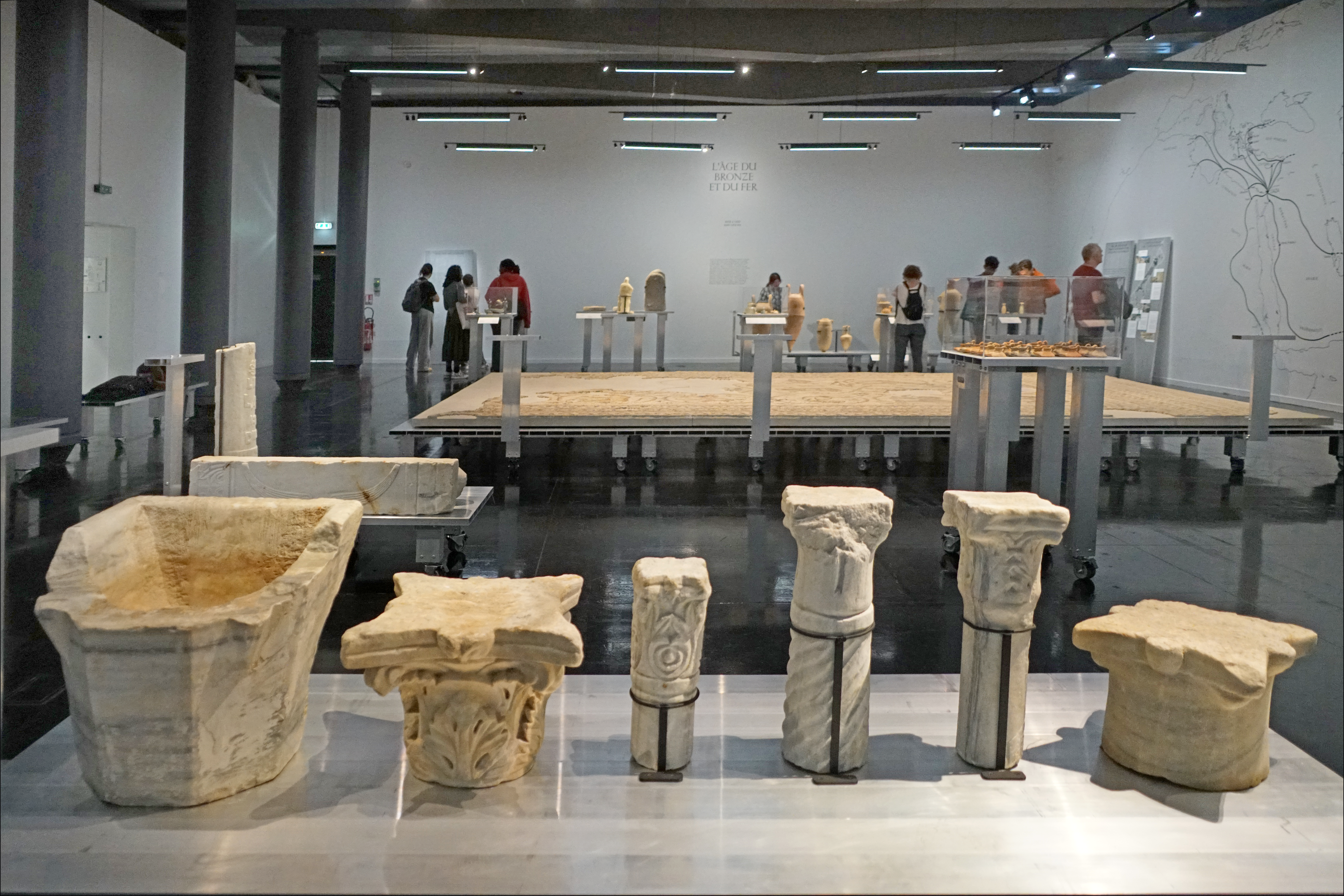
The first room of the 2025 exhibition Saved Treasures of Gaza: 5000 Years of History

- 2026
  - Byblos, Millennia-old City of Lebanon

The Institut's library is the largest collection of works on the Arab world in France, with over 100,000 documents.

== In popular culture ==
Michel Houellebecq sets a pivotal scene in his novel Submission at a reception held in the Institute's rooftop restaurant and terrace.

== Awards ==
In 2018, the IMA won the Cultural Personality of the Year from the Sheikh Zayed Book Award.

== See also ==
- List of museums in Paris
- List of foreign cultural institutes in Paris
- Grand Projets
- Quai Branly
- Louvre Abu Dhabi
