= Ahmad Madoun =

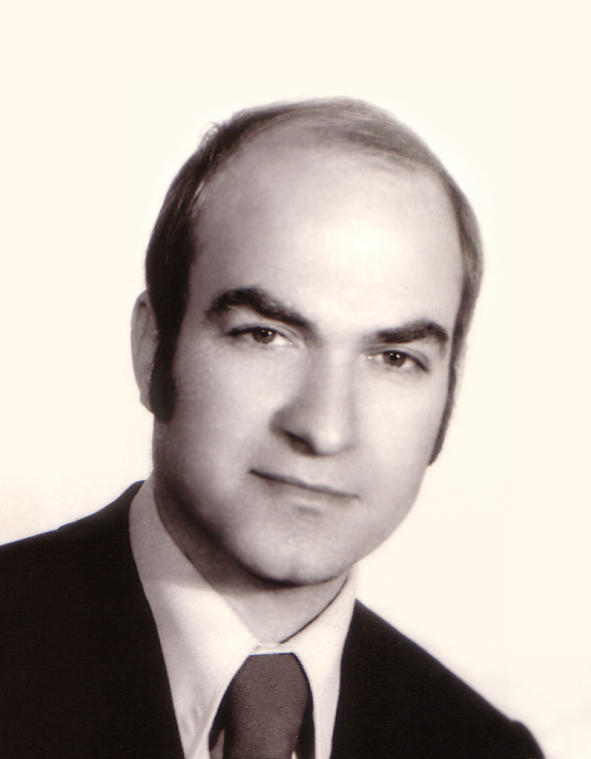
- Born: 1941; Palmyra, Syria
- Died: 1983 (aged 41–42)
- Occupation: Painter

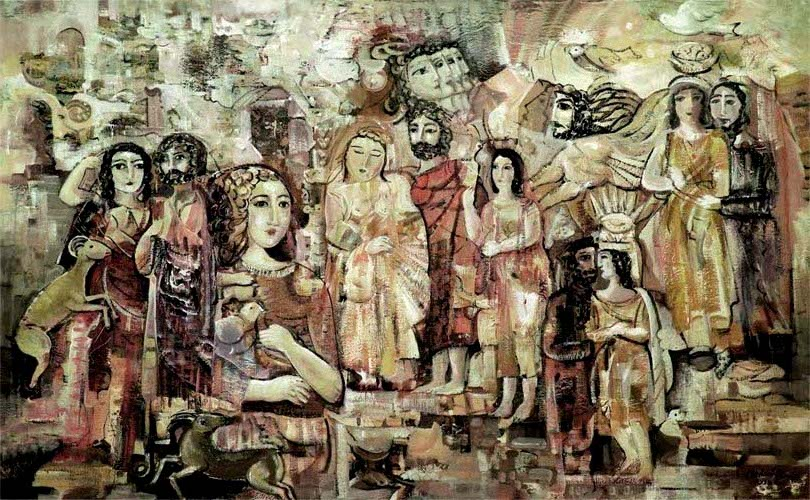
Celebration by Ahmad Madoun

Ahmad Madoun (1941–1983) was a Syrian painter. Born in Palmyra, he was associated with modern Syrian plastic arts and produced figurative works influenced by the cultural heritage and ancient ruins of his native city.

Madoun studied art privately and later studied in Egypt before returning to Syria, where he worked in fine arts institutions. He began exhibiting his work in 1976. His paintings often combined contemporary village life with imagery from Palmyra's archaeological and artistic heritage.

Madoun died in a car crash in 1983. His works are held in the modern art collection of the National Museum of Damascus, as well as in private collections in Syria and abroad.
