= Kamel Madoun =

Algerian handball player and coach (c.1960–2020)

Personal information
- Nationality: Algerian
- Born: c. 1960
- Died: 27 November 2020

Sport
- Sport: Handball

Senior clubs
- Years: Team
- ?–?: NA Hussein Dey
National team
- Years: Team
- ?–?: Algeria

Teams managed
- ?–?: NA Hussein Dey
- ?–?: Baath sportif de Béni Khiar
- 1997–1998: SC Moknine
- 1998–1999: CO Médenine
- 1999–2000: JS Kairouan
- 2000–2006: NA Hussein Dey
- 2006–2007: Nadi Madhar
- 2007–2008: Al-Noor SC
- 2008: Chabab Riadi Baladiat Baraki
- 2008–2009: Muscat Club
- 2009–2010: Nadi Madhar
- 2012–2013: Al-Shamal SC
- 2013–2014: Nadi Madhar
- 2014–2015: Al-Wasi F. C.
- 2015–2016: Al-Arabi SC
- 2018–2019: Oman Club

Kamel Madoun (c. 1960 – 27 November 2020) was an Algerian handball player and coach. After spending his playing career with NA Hussein Dey and the Algerian national team, he became a coach, leading several teams in Algeria and abroad.

== Awards ==
=== Player ===
- Bronze Medal in the African Men's Junior Handball Championship (1980)

=== Coach ===
- Finalist in the Algerian Handball Cup (2008)
- Winner of the Oman Handball Championship (2009, 2019)
- Winner of the Saudi Arabian Handball Championship (2010)
- Finalist in the Arab Handball Championship of Champions (2013)
- Finalist in the Oman Handball Super Cup (2018)
