= George Awde =

American visual artist

George Awde is a visual artist currently based in Doha, Qatar. Awde’s photographs explore contemporary masculinity, ideas of state, the formation of kinship, and the self, through photographs of young men in the Middle East.

== Early life and education ==
Awde was born in 1980 in Boston, Massachusetts and raised by Lebanese immigrants. He received his BFA in Painting from the Massachusetts College of Art in 2004 and his MFA in Photography from Yale University in 2009. The events of the September 11 attacks and the aftermath of anti-Middle Eastern sentiment in the United States pushed Awde to explore his Lebanese and Arab roots in his practice.

== Art ==
After struggling with a class assignment that required him to translate his feelings about 9/11 into art, Awde made the decision to fly to the Middle East to reconnect with his identity. His first solo exhibition in 2004 at the Deluxe Gallery in Boston, Massachusetts showed work from his explorations of Yemen.

George Awde's current work explores masculinity and youth through image-making. He mostly photographs men and boys, with his subjects including Syrian immigrants in Beirut. LightWork Gallery's press release for Awde's solo exhibition Scale Without Measure stated that "His pictures explore the way that people interact with one another, and in them one senses a longing to belong." He becomes close with his subjects before photographing an intimate look at their everyday lives and relationships.

Awde is the co-founder and co-director of marra.tein, a residency and research initiative in Beirut. Founded in 2012, marra.tein serves as a space for hosting researchers and artists for residencies, projects, dialogue, partnerships with local institutions, and furthering engagements and practices in Lebanon.

He is a professor at VCUArts Qatar and a member of the Arab Image Foundation board.

== Solo exhibitions ==
- 2017 Scale Without Measure: Kathleen O. Ellis Gallery, Light Work. Syracuse
- 2016 Still Departures: Sultan Gallery. Kuwait
- 2016 Imagined Measures: Gallery 39K. Lahore
- 2015 Fragile States: East Wing. Dubai
- 2014 His Passing Cover: 15th FotoFest Biennial. O'Kane Gallery, U of Houston Downtown
- 2011 Quiet Crossings: Korn Gallery, Drew University. Madison
- 2005 Six Months in Sana’a: UNESCO Palace. Beirut

== Awards ==
- 2014 FOAM: Paul Huf Award, Nominee
- 2013 FOAM: Paul Huf Award, Nominee
- 2013 MACK: First Book Award, Nominee
- 2012 Aaron Siskind Foundation: Individual Photographer’s Fellowship
- 2012 CENTER: Choice Awards, Gallerist’s Choice (2nd Place)
- 2012 FOAM: Paul Huf Award, Nominee
- 2011 CENTER: Santa Fe Prize, Nominee
- 2011 Magenta Foundation: Flash Forward, Emerging Photographers
