= Hypogeum of the Volumnius family =

Etruscan tomb

Coordinates: 43.0893°N 12.4244°E

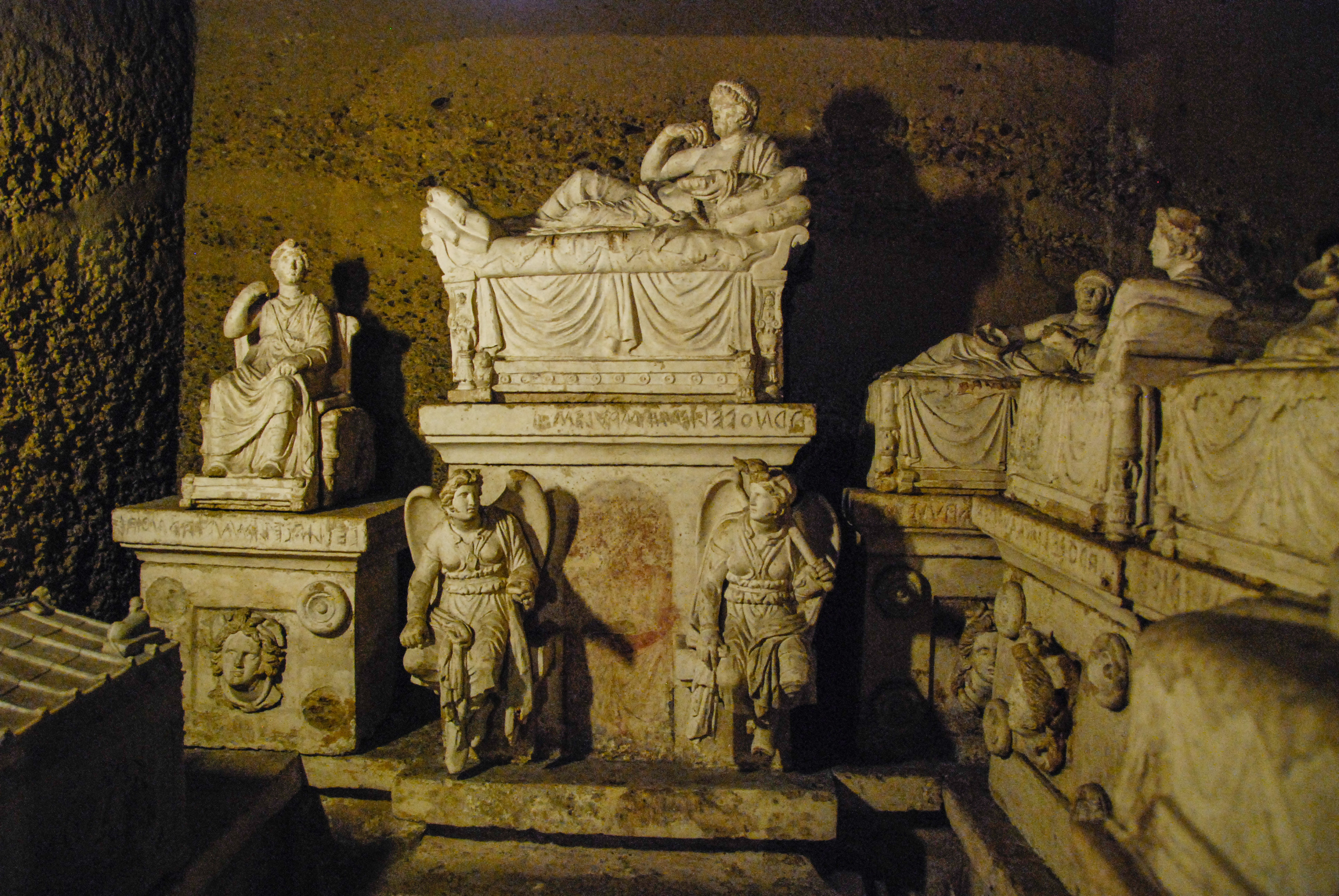
Interior of the tomb

The Hypogeum of the Volumnus family (Italian: Ipogeo dei Volumni) is an Etruscan tomb in Ponte San Giovanni, a suburb of Perugia, Umbria, central Italy. Its dating is uncertain, although it is generally assigned to the 3rd century BC.

The hypogeum was the Roman-Etruscan tomb of Arnth Velimna Aules. It is part of the larger Palazzone necropolis, a burial ground dating to the 6th–5th century BC, with numerous subterranean tombs. Visitors can see and enter some of the tombs found along paths in the site's grounds. A museum building displays funerary urns and other artifacts found in the excavations of the area. More urns are displayed in the separate building covering the Volumnus tomb. The Volumnus tomb itself is accessed by a staircase which leads several metres under the surface to the portal leading inside to a vestibule. This in turn opens into four small side chambers and three larger central ones, the middle of which housed the remains of the family's main members. Only this chamber now displays burial urns and artifacts. Arnth's urn is made of travertine, and is surmounted by a representation of the deceased lying on a triclinium.

The tomb was used until the 1st century BC. It was rediscovered on 5 February 1840.

== See also ==
- Etruscan architecture
- Etruscan civilization
- Etruscan art
