= Hypogeum =

Underground temple or tomb

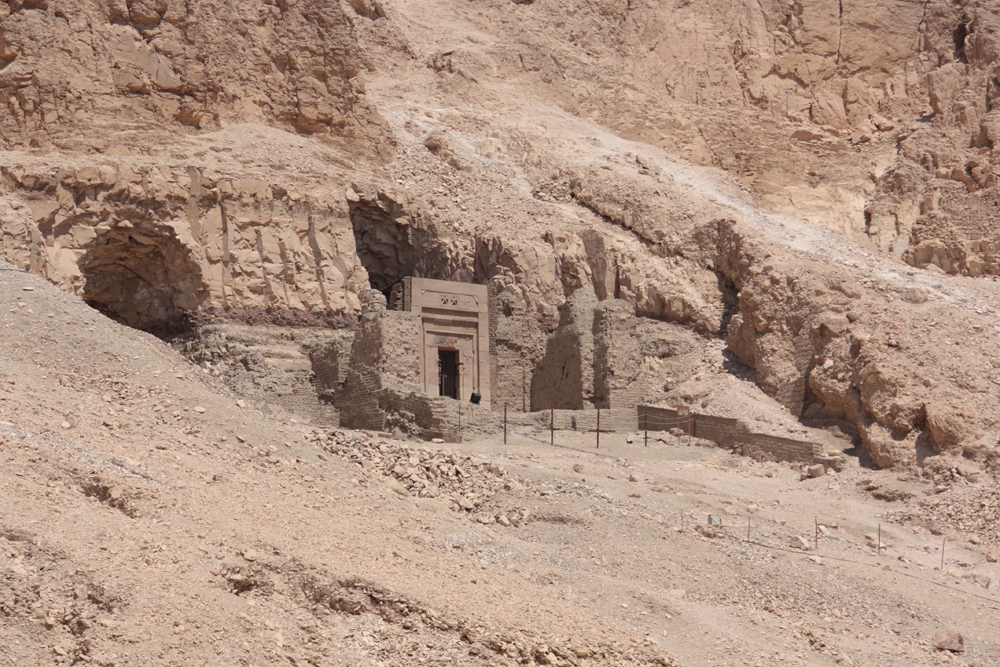
The entrance of a tomb at the Theban Necropolis—TT 353. The entrance was built by the order of Sen-en-Mut, 97.36m long and 41.93m deep

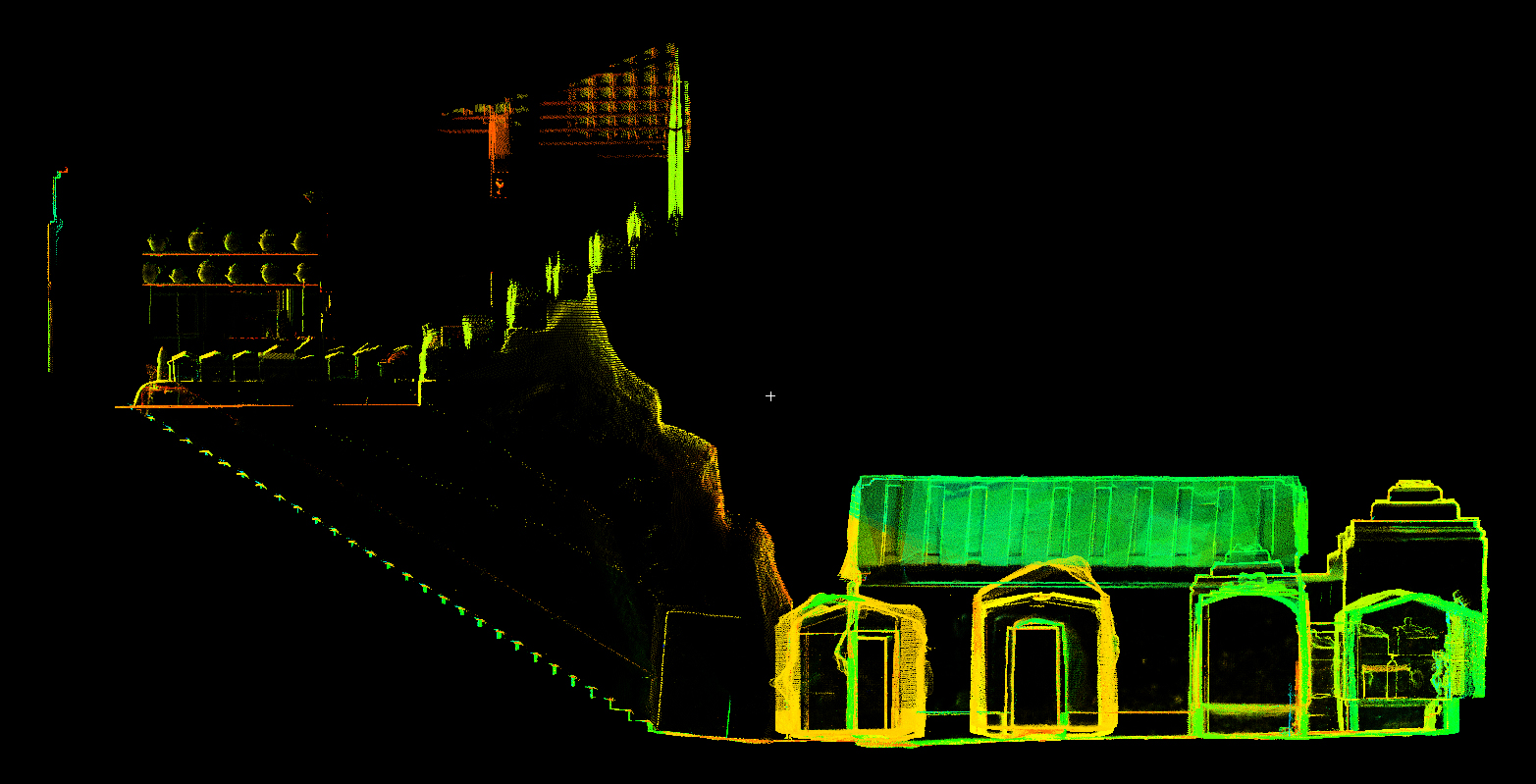
3D laser scan profile of the Hypogeum of the Volumnus family

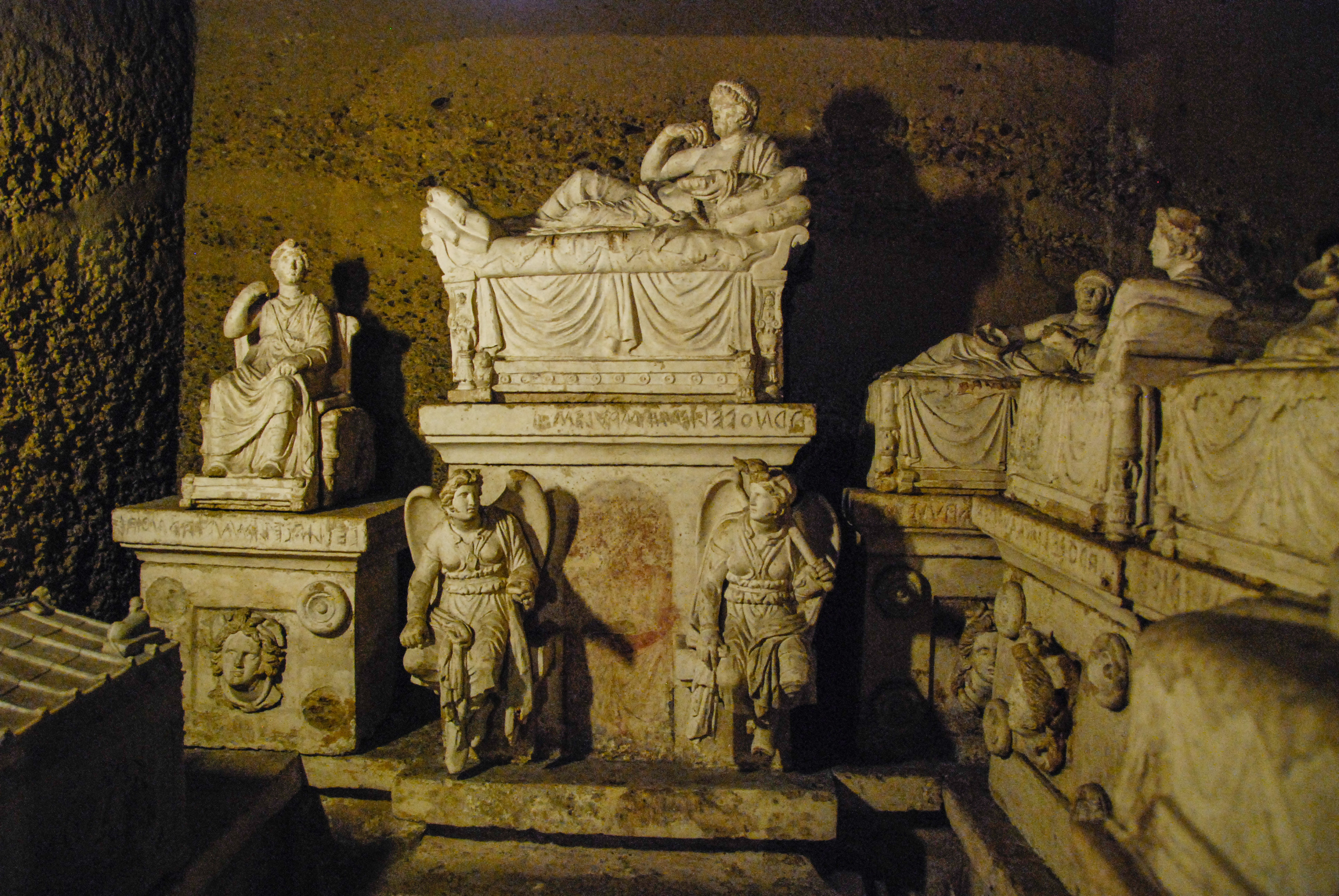
Tablinum inside Hypogeum of the Volumni, in the northern end of the crypt

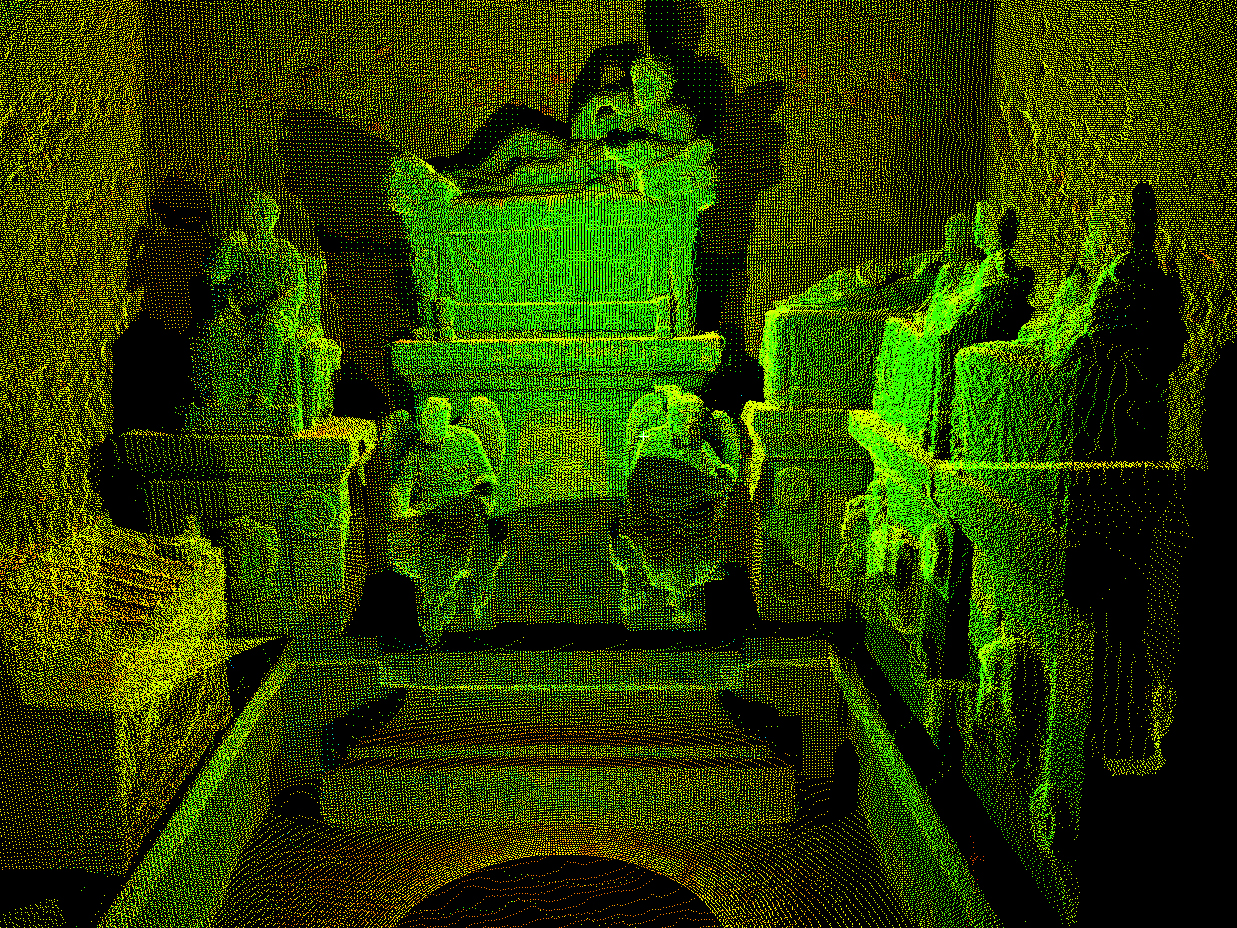
3D image of Tablinum inside Hypogeum of the Volumni, cut from a laser scan

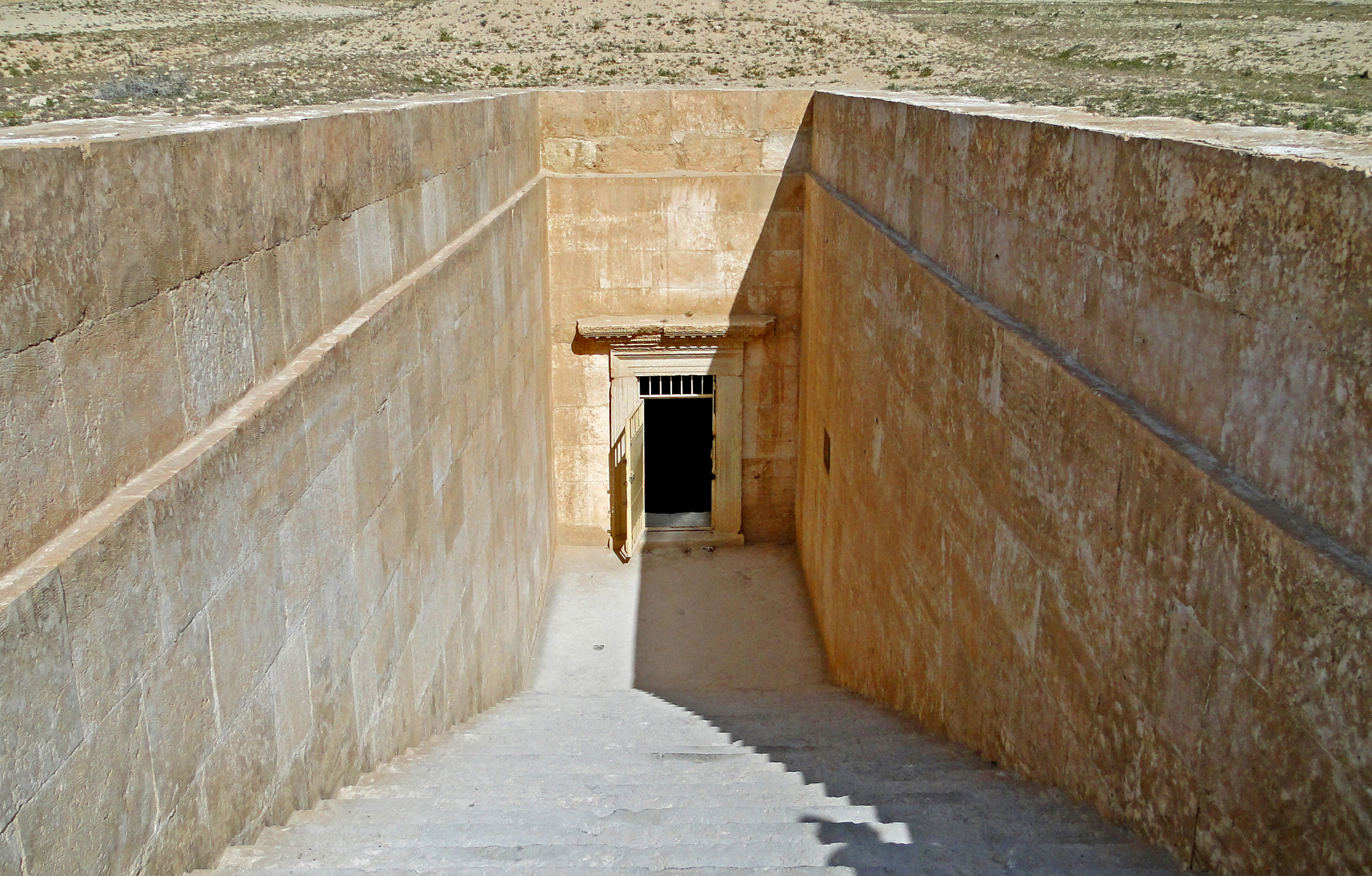
Entrance of the Three Brothers' hypogeum in Palmyra, Syria

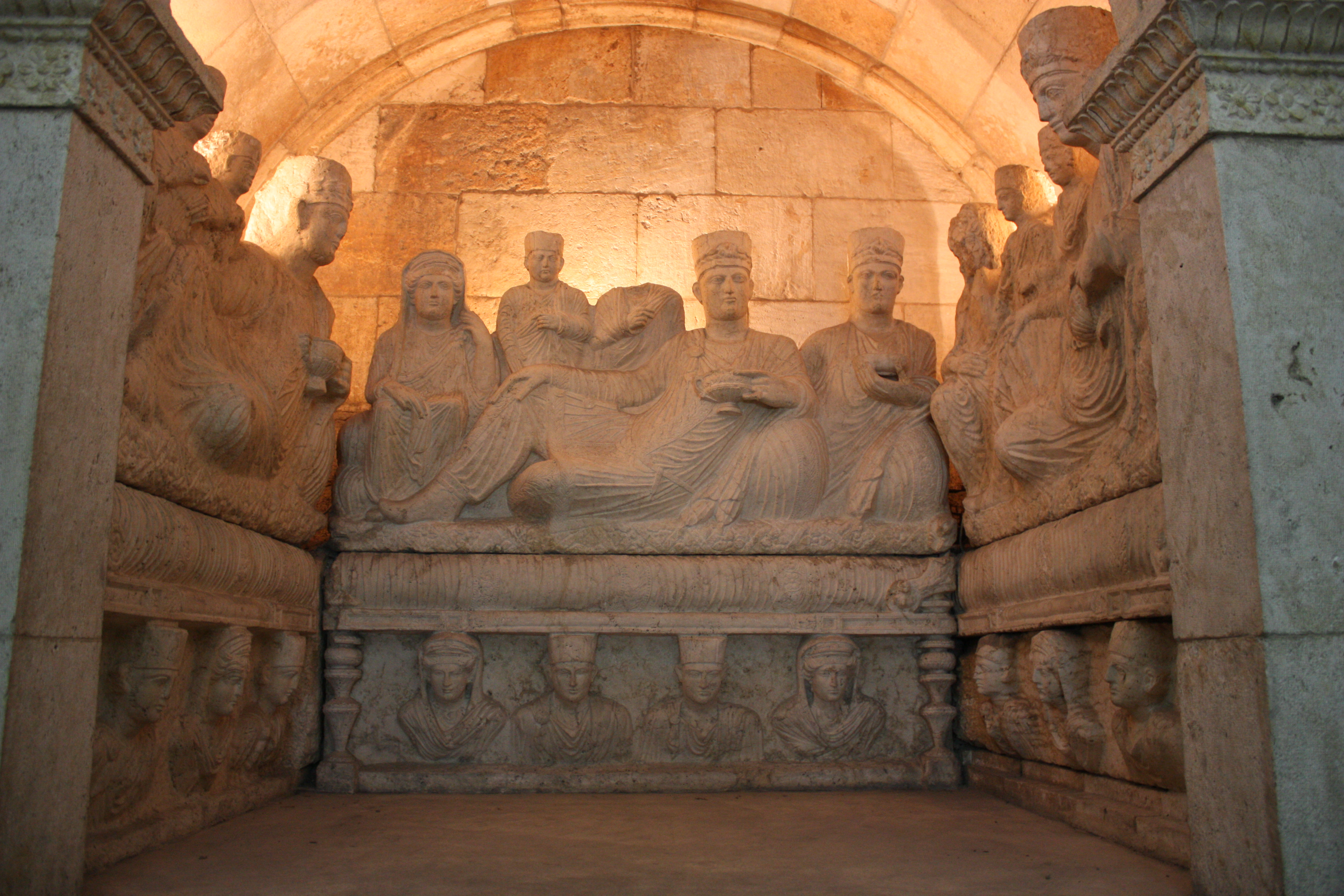
Hypogeum of Yarhai, Damascus, Syria

A hypogeum or hypogaeum (/ˌhaɪpəˈdʒiːəm/ HY-pə-JEE-əm; plural hypogea or hypogaea; literally meaning "underground") (Note: From Greek ὑπόγειον (hypógeion), from ὑπό (hypó, 'under') and γῆ (gê, 'earth').) is an underground temple or tomb.

Hypogea will often contain niches for cremated human remains or loculi for buried remains. Occasionally tombs of this type are referred to as built tombs.

The term hypogeum can also refer to any antique building or part of building built below ground such as the series of tunnels under the Colosseum which held slaves (particularly enemy captives) and animals while keeping them ready to fight in the gladiatorial games. The animals and slaves could be let up through trapdoors under the sand-covered arena at any time during a fight.

== Examples ==
An early example of a hypogeum is found at the Minoan Bronze Age site of Knossos on Crete. Hogan notes this underground vault was of a beehive shape and cut into the soft rock. The Ħal Saflieni Hypogeum in Paola, Malta, is the oldest example of a prehistoric hypogeum, the earliest phase dating to 3600–3300 BC. It is a complex of underground chambers, halls and passages covering approximately 500 m^{2} (5,400 sq ft) on three levels, partly carved to imitate temple architecture and containing extensive prehistoric art. In Larnaka, Cyprus, the Lefkaritis Tomb was discovered in 1999.

Hypogea were also found in Dynastic Egypt, such as at the Northern Mazghuna pyramid, Southern Mazghuna pyramid and Southern South Saqqara pyramid. The hypogea in ancient Palmyra contained loculi closed with slabs bearing sculptured portrait reliefs, and sarcophagi with sculptured family banqueting scenes on their lids.

The later Christians built similar underground shrines, crypts and tombs, which they called catacombs. But this was only a difference in name, rather than purpose and rituals, and archaeological and historical research shows they were effectively the same. Werner Jacobsen wrote:

Like other ambitious Romans, the bishop-saints of the third and fourth centuries were usually buried in hypogea in the cemeteries outside the walls of their cities; often it was only miracles at their tombs that caused their successors to adopt more up-to-date designs. In Dijon the saint and bishop Benignus (d. c. 274) was buried in a large sarcophagus in a chamber tomb in the Roman cemetery. By the sixth century the tomb had long since fallen into disrepair and was regarded as pagan, even by Bishop Gregory of Langres.

Hypogea were constructed across the pre-Columbian New World during the first millennium AD. Some of these tombs were over 10 meters in diameter and contained two or three free-standing columns, ornamental pilasters, and side chambers. The largest concentration of these hypogea are found in the National Archeological Park of Tierradentro, a UNESCO World Heritage Site in southwest Colombia.

== Other subterranean constructions ==
Other excavated structures, not used for ritual purposes, include the Greco-Roman cryptoporticus. Other cultures also have constructed underground structures, including the dugout, souterrain, yaodong, fogou, erdstall, and kiva.

== Sources ==
- Curl, James Stevens (2006). A Dictionary of Architecture and Landscape Architecture (Paperback) (2nd ed.). Oxford University Press. p. 880. ISBN 0-19-860678-8.
