= Loculus (architecture) =

Burial niche

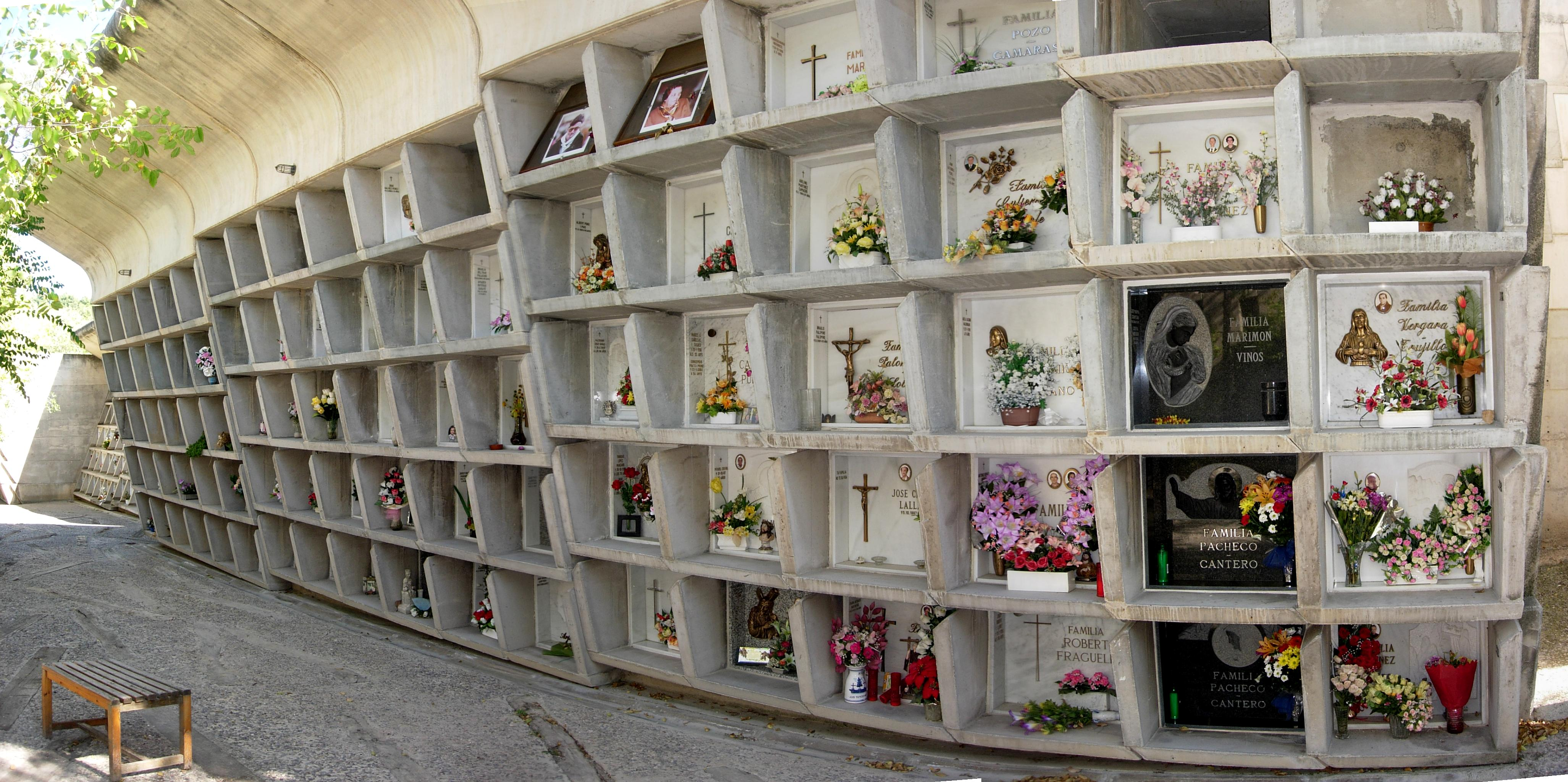
Concrete loculi at Igualada Cemetery, Spain

Loculus (Latin, "little place"), plural loculi, is an architectural compartment or niche that houses a body, as in a catacomb, hypogeum, mausoleum or other place of entombment. In classical antiquity, the mouth of the loculus might be closed with a slab, plain, as in the Catacombs of Rome, or sculptural, as in the family tombs of ancient Palmyra.

== See also ==
- Kokh (tomb): sometimes translated as "loculus"
- Arcosolium: another niche-like tomb
- Glossary of architecture

== Sources ==
- Curl, James Stevens (2006). A Dictionary of Architecture and Landscape Architecture (Paperback) (2nd ed.). Oxford University Press. p. 880 pages. ISBN 0-19-860678-8.
