= Palmyrene funerary reliefs =

Busts first produced in ancient city in central Syria

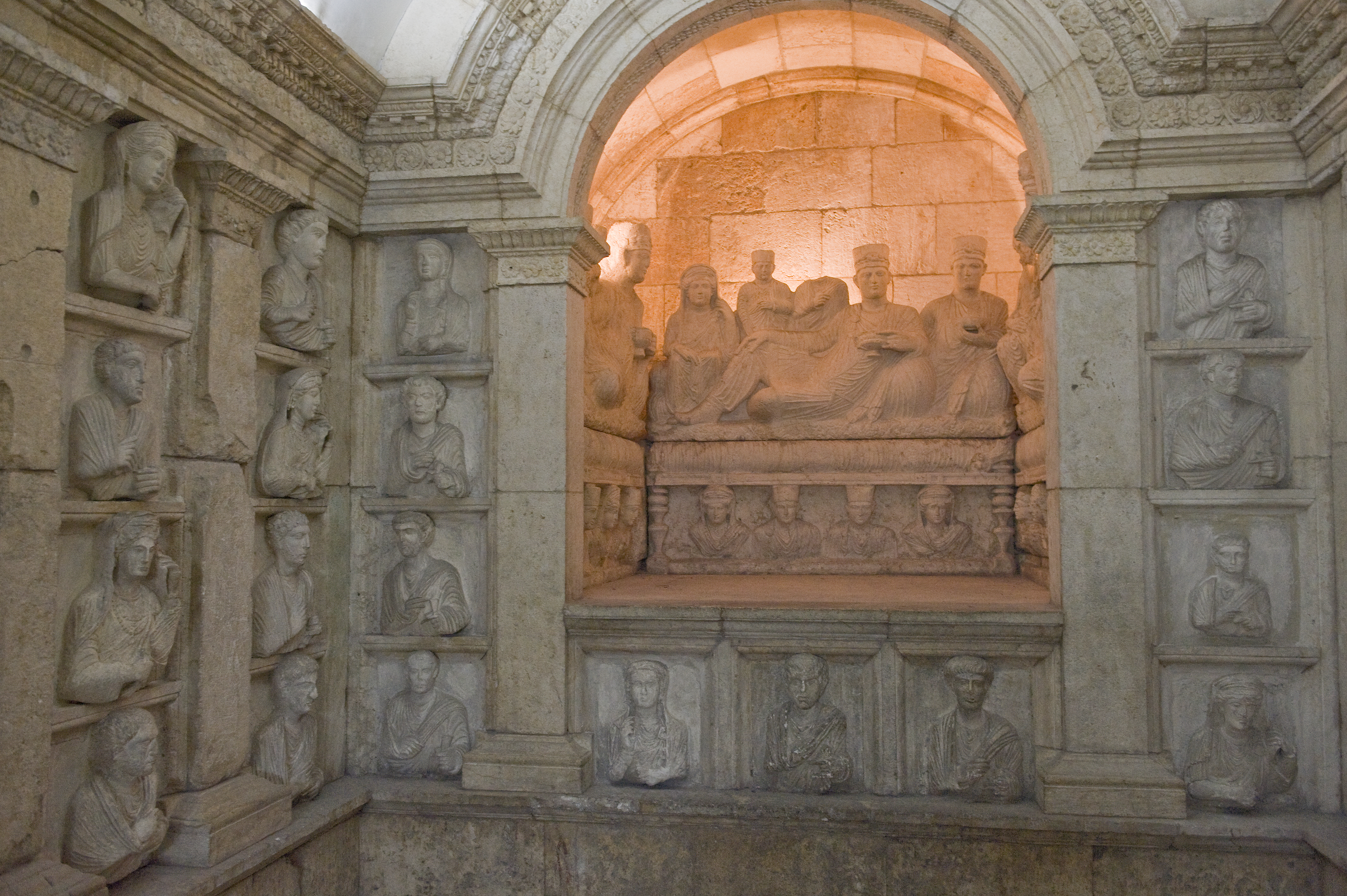
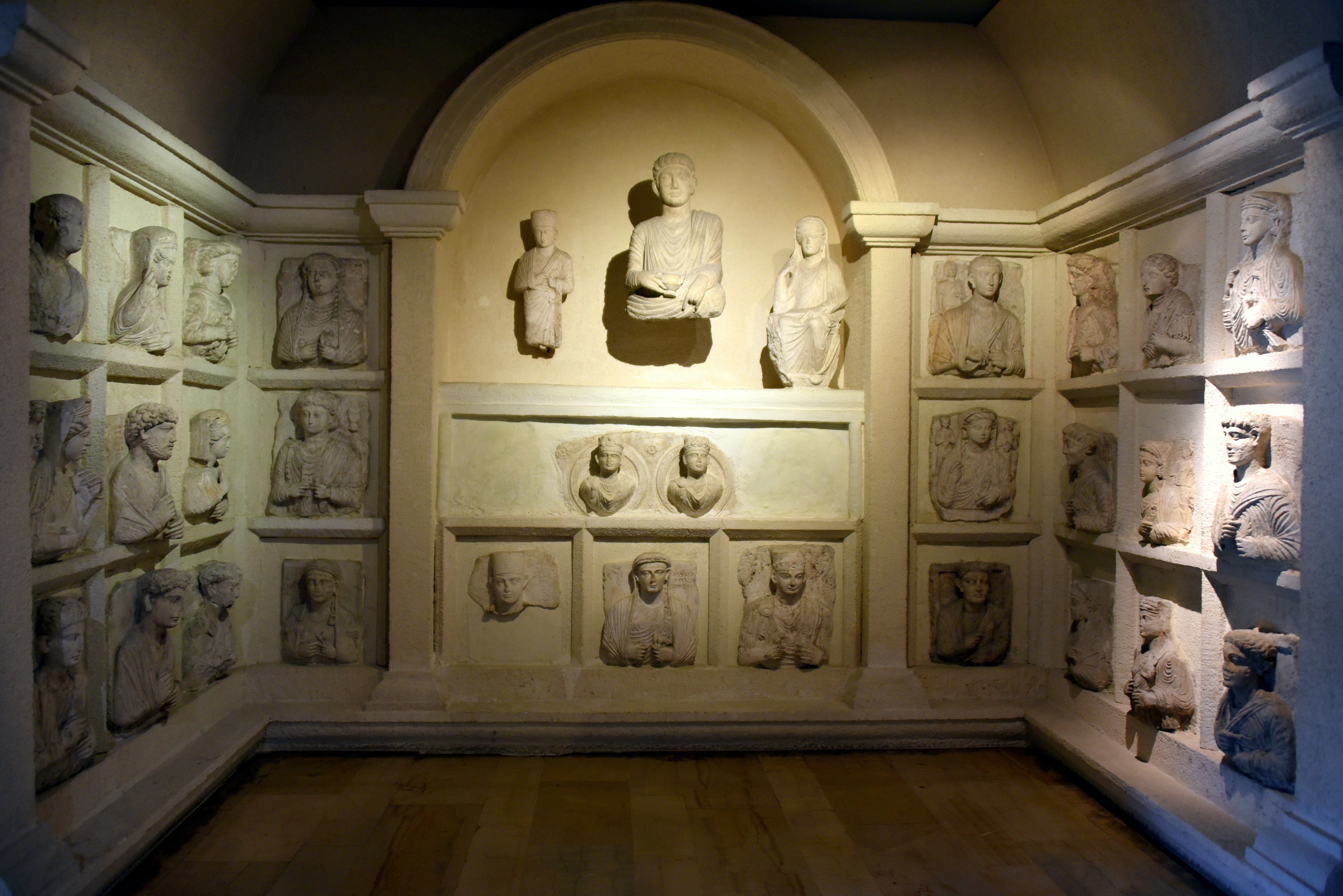
Palmyrene funerary reliefs on display at the National Museum of Damascus and Istanbul Archaeology Museums

Palmyrene funerary reliefs are almost 4000 busts on decorative slabs closing burial niches inside underground tombs, produced in Palmyra over three centuries from the middle of the first century BC. It is the largest corpus of portrait sculpture in the Roman world outside Rome and the largest collection of funerary representations from one place in the classical world.

The reliefs were carved into square pieces of limestone and depicted figures in a direct frontal pose cut off at mid-torso. Arms and hands were portrayed in various gestures and poses. Most busts display a solitary figure, however some sculptures incorporate multiple figures of family members. The names and lineage of the deceased are engraved with Palmyrene inscriptions in Palmyrene Aramaic above the shoulders, and in some cases, with Koine Greek or Syriac.

Palmyrene funerary reliefs ceased to be produced after the city's sack by the Roman Empire in 273, which marked an end to its growth, development, wealth, and to its civilization altogether.

Aarhus University's Palmyra Portrait Project, led by Professor Rubina Raja, has digitised over 3,700 of the reliefs. The largest collection are in Syria (e.g. the National Museum of Damascus and the National Museum of Aleppo) and the Istanbul Archaeology Museums. The Ny Carlsberg Glyptotek has the third largest collection and other large collections are held by the Louvre, Yale University Art Gallery, the Metropolitan Museum of Art, the Ashmolean Museum, the National Museum of Denmark, the Fitzwilliam Museum and the British Museum.

== Description ==
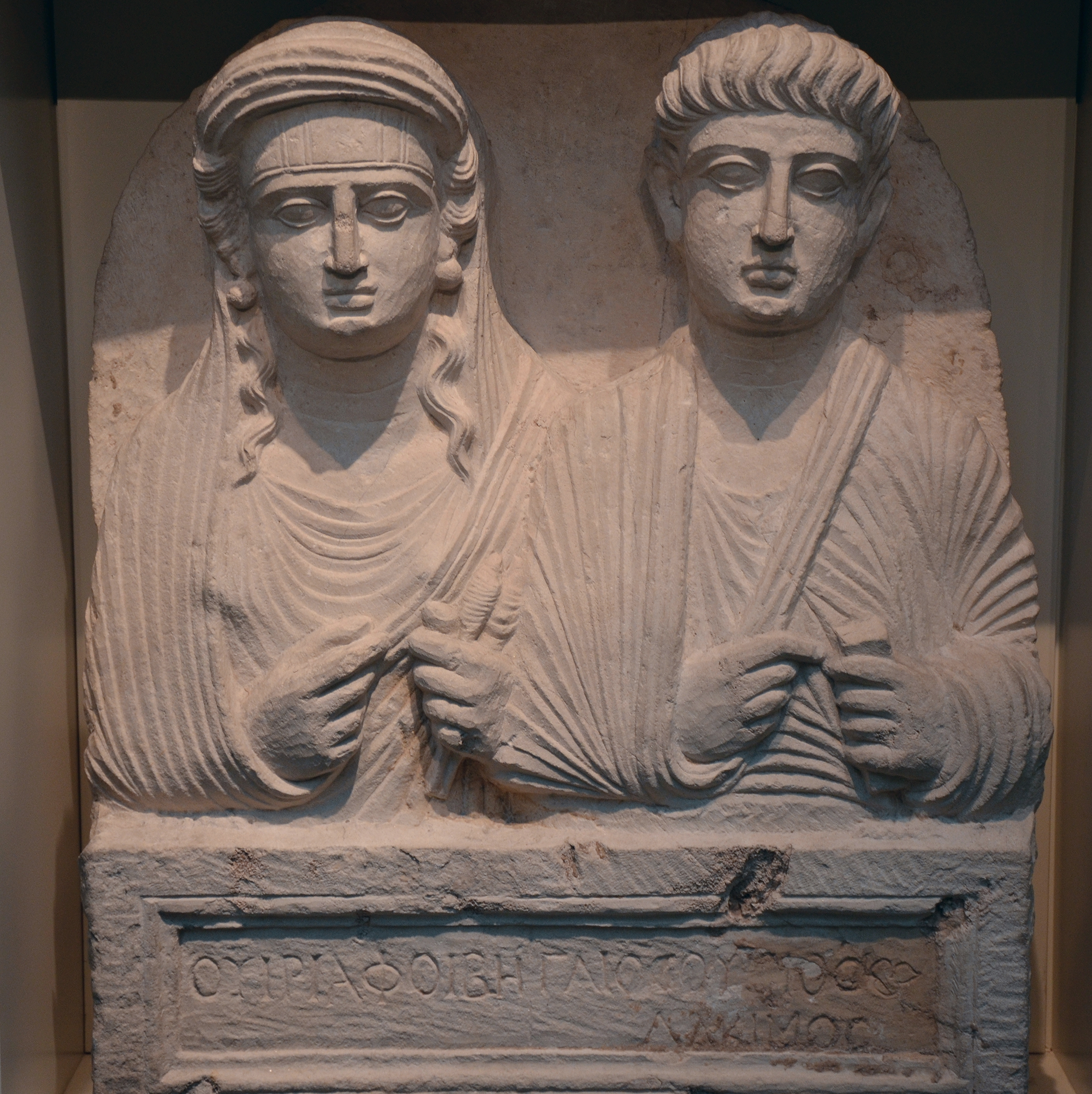
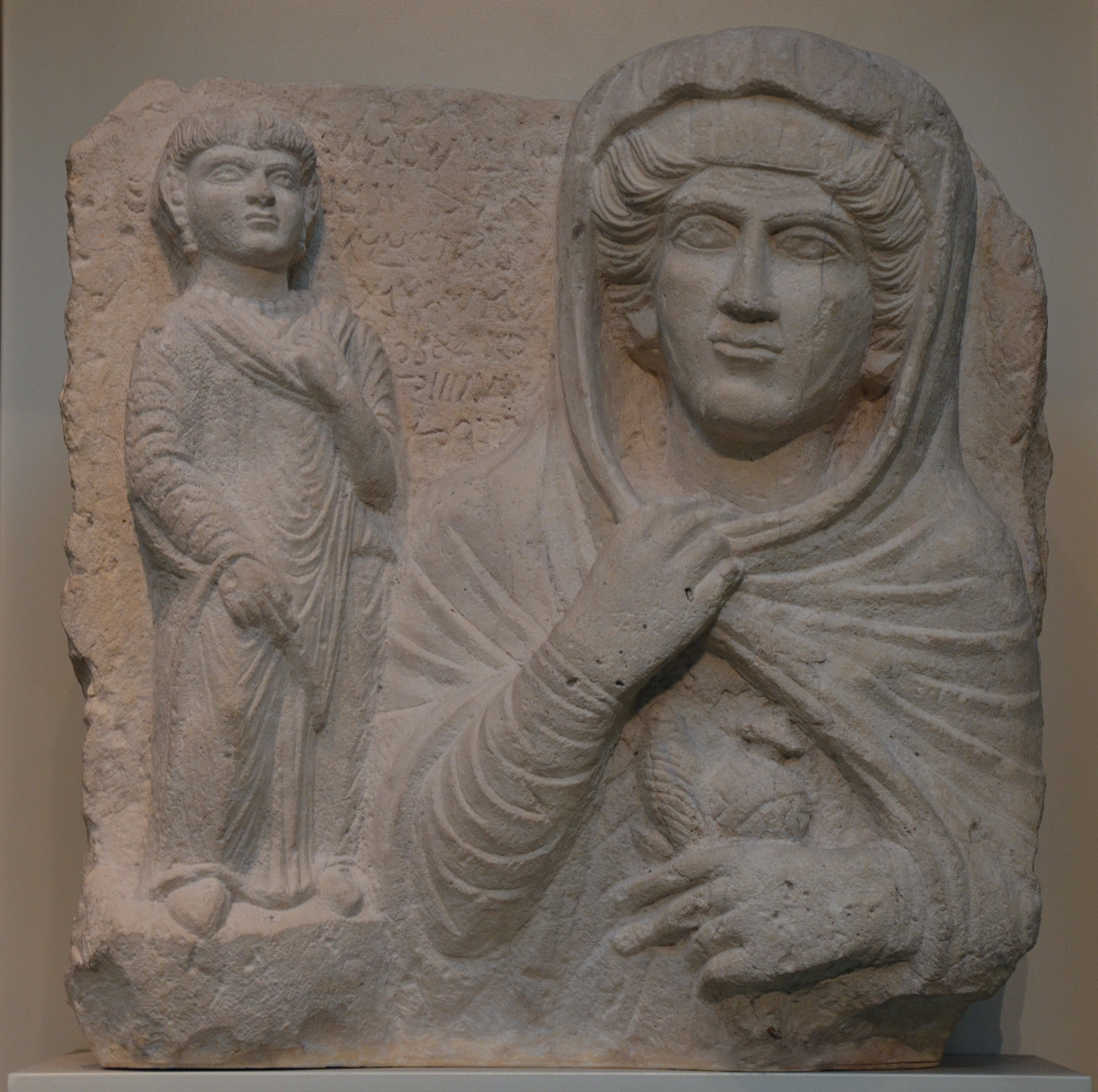
Funerary reliefs depicting husband and wife, and parents and their children were also common. Inscription in Aramaic reads: Viria Phoebe and Gaius Vurus (left) and Alas! Shalmat her mother. Alas! Shalmat daughter of Shamshigeram in the month Elul in the year 495 [AD 184] Hairan her son. (right) London, England

It is believed that Palmyrene funerary busts were created as symbolic decoration rather than portrayals of physical likeness. There is little individualization in the representation of figures, and like most ancient portraits the facial features are idealized. Male figures are depicted wearing a himation and chiton. The right arm is often wrapped in the himation with the hand placed on the chest. The left hand sometimes holds an attribute, often a scroll or leaf. Female busts are depicted wearing a tunic, cloak and veil. The right hand is often raised to the chin or cheek, sometimes holding the veil. Some female figures are depicted with the left hand holding an attribute conveying domesticity, such as a spindle or distaff. There are also instances where some female figures are portrayed holding a looped fold of the cloak.

Female busts were sometimes shown with an outward palm. This is believed to be a gesture to ward off evil or related to involvement in religious rituals. Small-scale depictions of children are sometimes shown behind the parent.

Palmyrene funerary reliefs display a fusion of eastern and western influences. The busts mimic and display many features similar to Roman funerary reliefs. The static, frontal view of most busts is reminiscent of the frontality seen in ancient Egyptian Ka statues. This connection to Egypt is further found in the methods of mummification used in Palmyrene funerary rituals. The figures are depicted in Greek himations and chitons. Male figures are often depicted with their right arm wrapped in the himation and their hand placed on their chest. This gesture is derived from Greek models. Persian and eastern influences are found in the large scaled eyes with two concentric circles to mark the pupils. These influences are also found in the ornate jewelry.

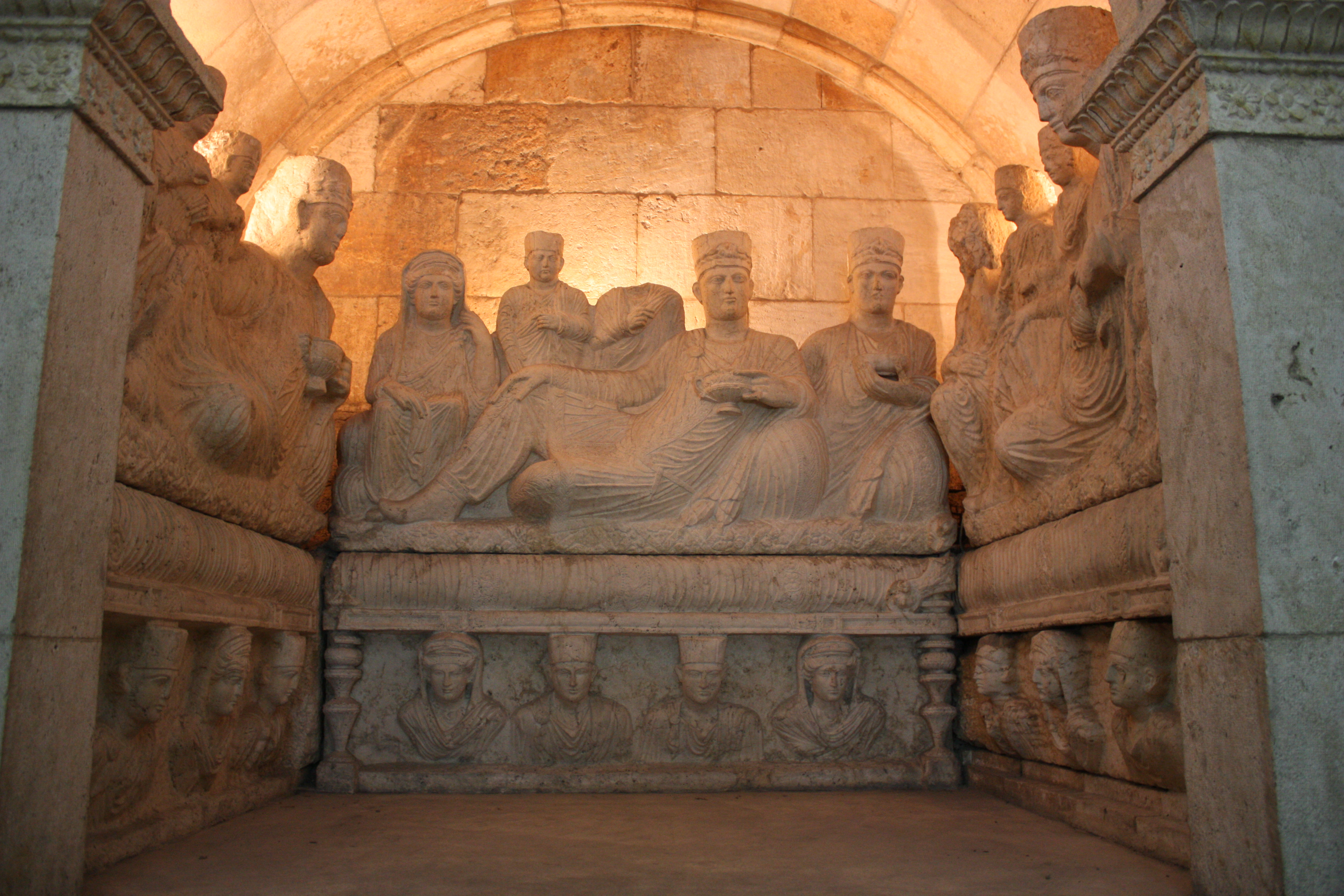
The Hypogeum of Yarhai. Damascus, Syria

Some variation in gestures and attributes allude to the individual's profession, wealth, or family roles. Male figures with a scroll or leaf are common and convey very little about individual identity. However, rare depictions portray a sword or whip indicating a caravan trader. Priests are identified by their modius, a cylinder shaped cap, and are usually portrayed holding objects such as a jug or vessel. Double portrait busts are sometimes depicted with one figure's arm around the shoulder of the other alluding to family ties and affection between figures. Several known double portrait busts depict a female figure with long hair, an exposed breast, and an arm over the shoulder of a male figure. These busts are believed to convey a wife mourning her deceased husband.

Another common theme was depicting favored objects and/or events that brought joy to the deceased during their lifetime. Such as a funerary relief depicting a merchant alongside his camel, which shows that he had a very close tie with the animal whom he probably frequently travelled with, that he chose to be depicted and remembered with this animal in death. Other examples of this are the funerary reliefs that depict certain family events favored by the deceased such as a meal or domestic settings portraying the family seated in their house reclining on a couch.

== Concordance ==
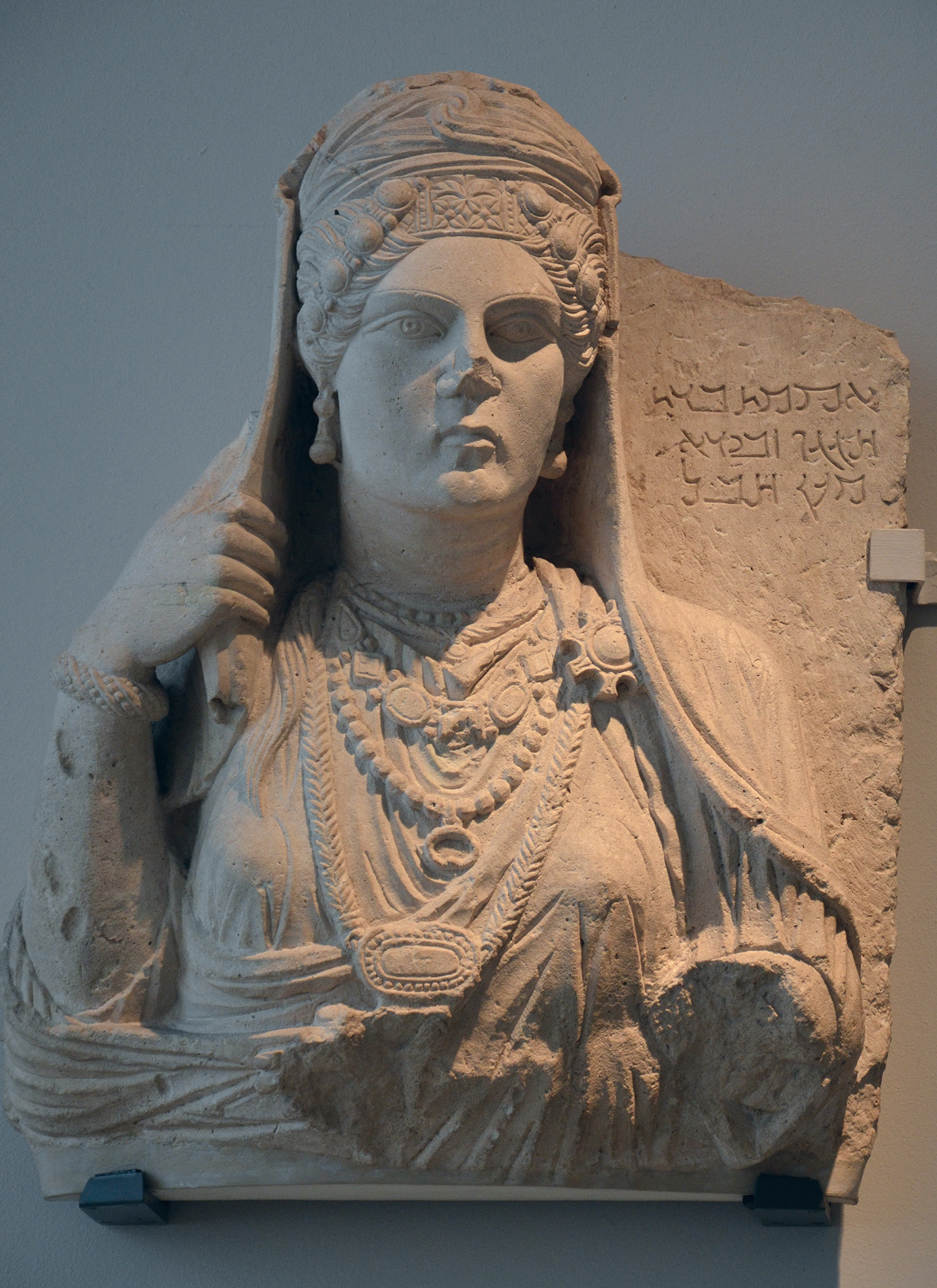
Funerary relief of "Aqmat" a fashionable, bejewled Palmyrene woman. The Aramic inscription read "Aqmat, daughter of Hagagu, descendant of Zebida, descendant of Ma'an. Alas!". London, England.

While there was continuity in the overall model and structure of the funerary busts, stylistic changes occurred over time. The busts can be places into three groups based on Dr. Harald Ingholt's 1928 chronological classifications: Group I (50-150 AD) Group II (150-200 AD), and Group III (200-273 AD).

=== Group I (50-150 AD) ===
Early Palmyrene funerary busts are less naturalistic than later styles. The drapery is stylized and often includes patterns. Eyes are large and wide open with two concentric circles representing pupils. Male figures are beardless. Female figures wear austere clothing with little to no jewelry. They are often shown holding a domestic object, such as a spindle or distaff.

=== Group II (150-200 AD) ===
Male figures began to be portrayed with beards, a trend brought into fashion by the Emperor Hadrian. Roman influences are also depicted in the rendering of the hair, which becomes thicker and longer. A more naturalistic style emerges in the depictions of eyes and wrinkles on brows. Pupils are sometimes marked by drilled holes. Drapery becomes softer and looser. Backgrounds emerge depicting camels and horses in busts of desert men. Female figures are depicted with more exposed arms that are raised to touch the face or veil. More female figures begin wearing earrings, necklaces, rings, and bracelets. Symbols of domesticity decline, likely related to an increase in wealth during this time.

=== Group III (200-273 AD) ===
Funerary sculpture becomes more naturalistic in style, beards continue to be shown on depictions of men and are raised slightly from the face. Curves and folds in clothing are depicted much more smoothly than previous categories and regular curves are broken up. Female figures are no longer shown with attributes of domesticity. It is common for their hands to hold their veils to display an increased emphasis on drapery.

== Gallery ==
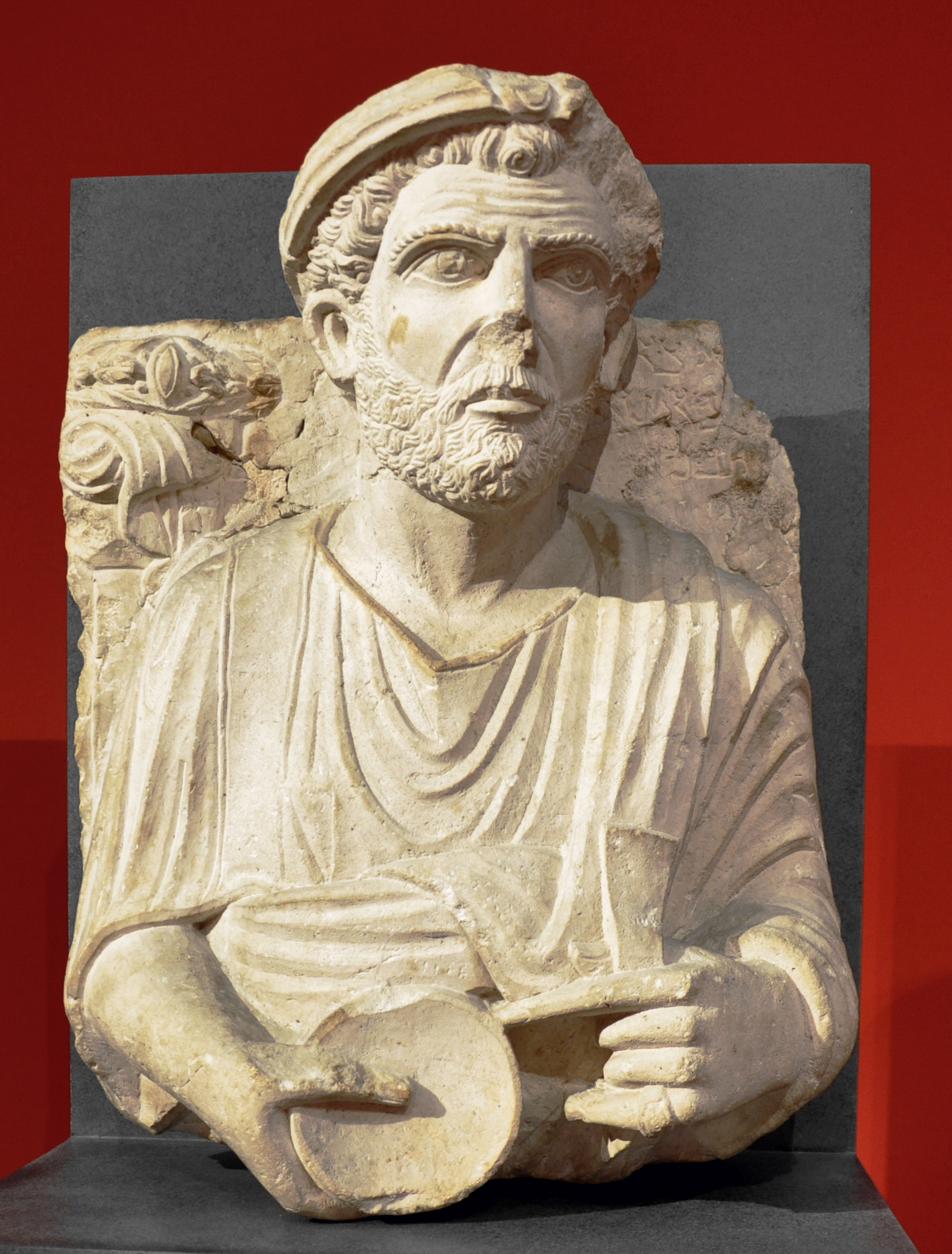
Bust of a 2nd-century Palmyrene man holding a sacrificial bowl. Frankfurt, Germany

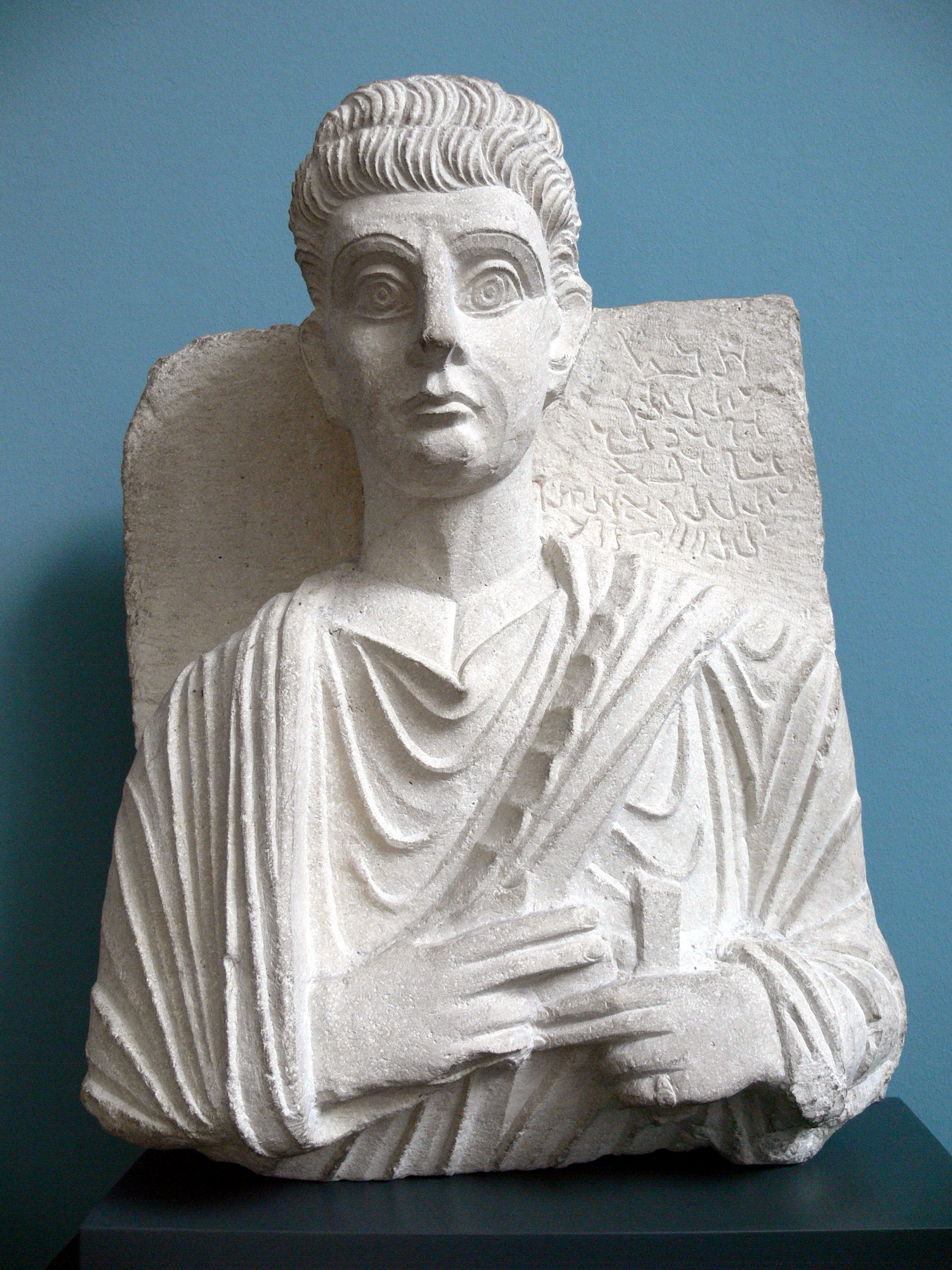
Relief of a man from the 2nd century AD. Copenhagen, Denmark

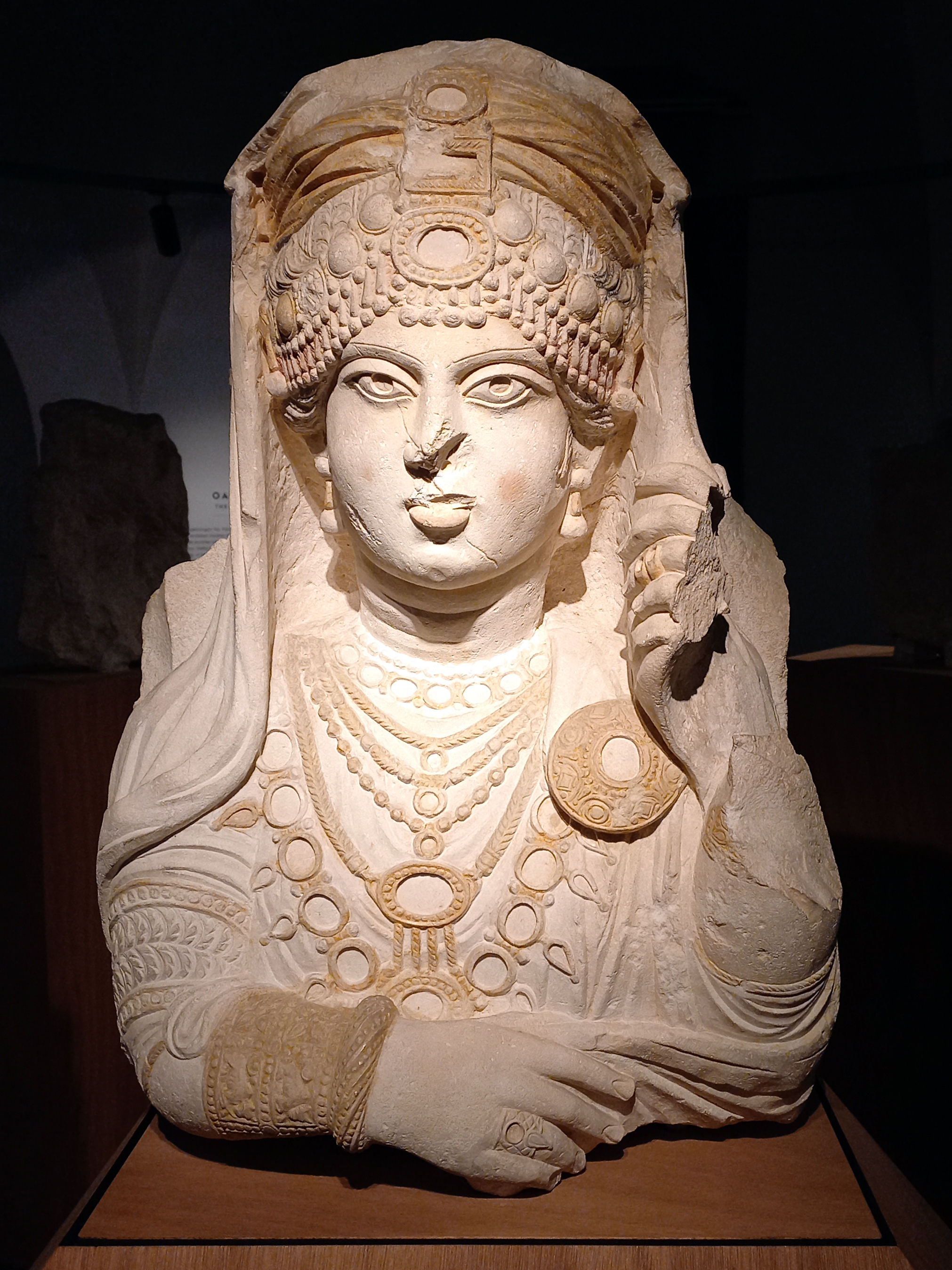
Relief of a woman from the 2nd century AD. Copenhagen, Denmark

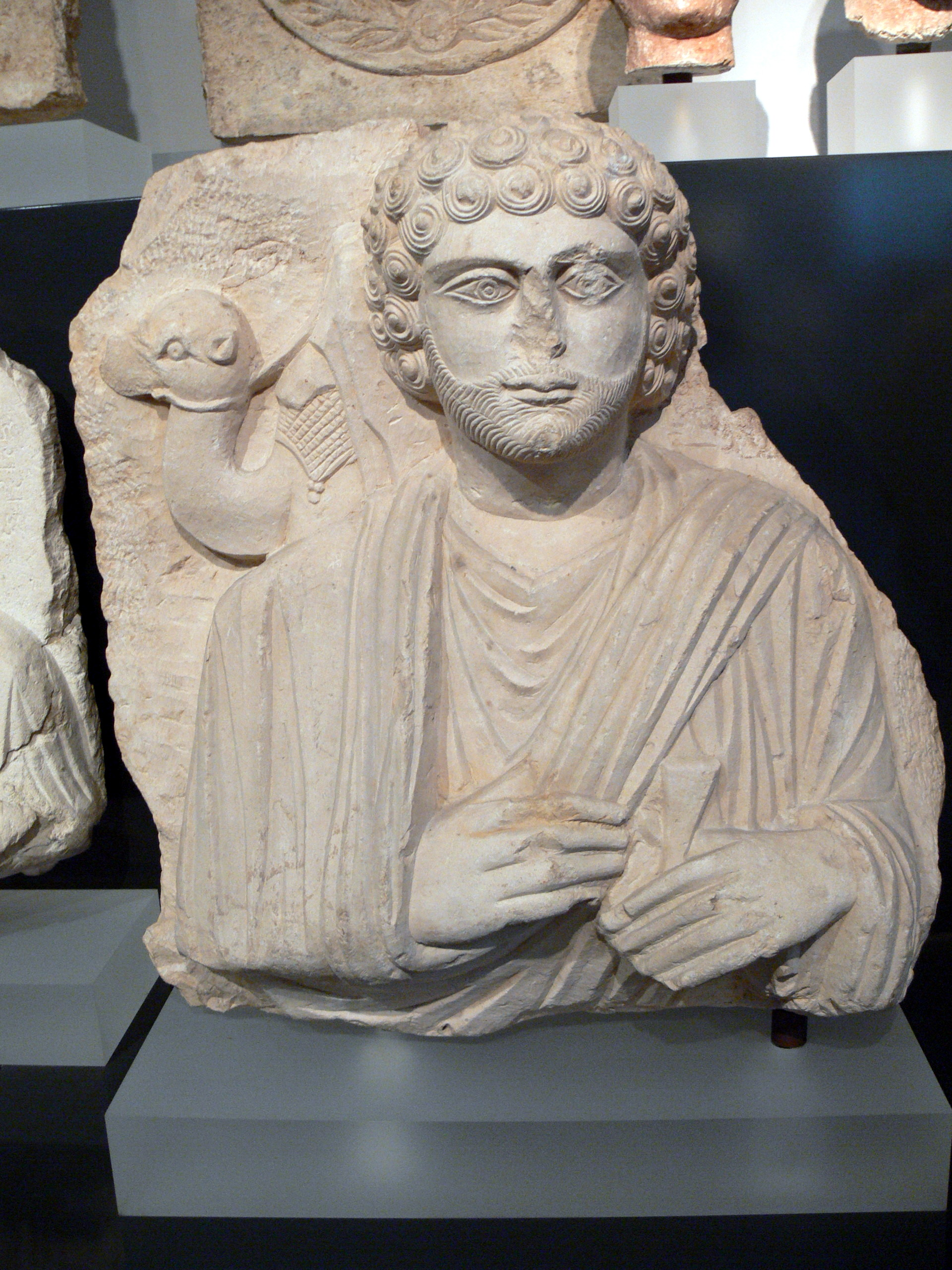
Relief of a merchant depicted with his camel from the 2nd century AD. Copenhagen, Denmark

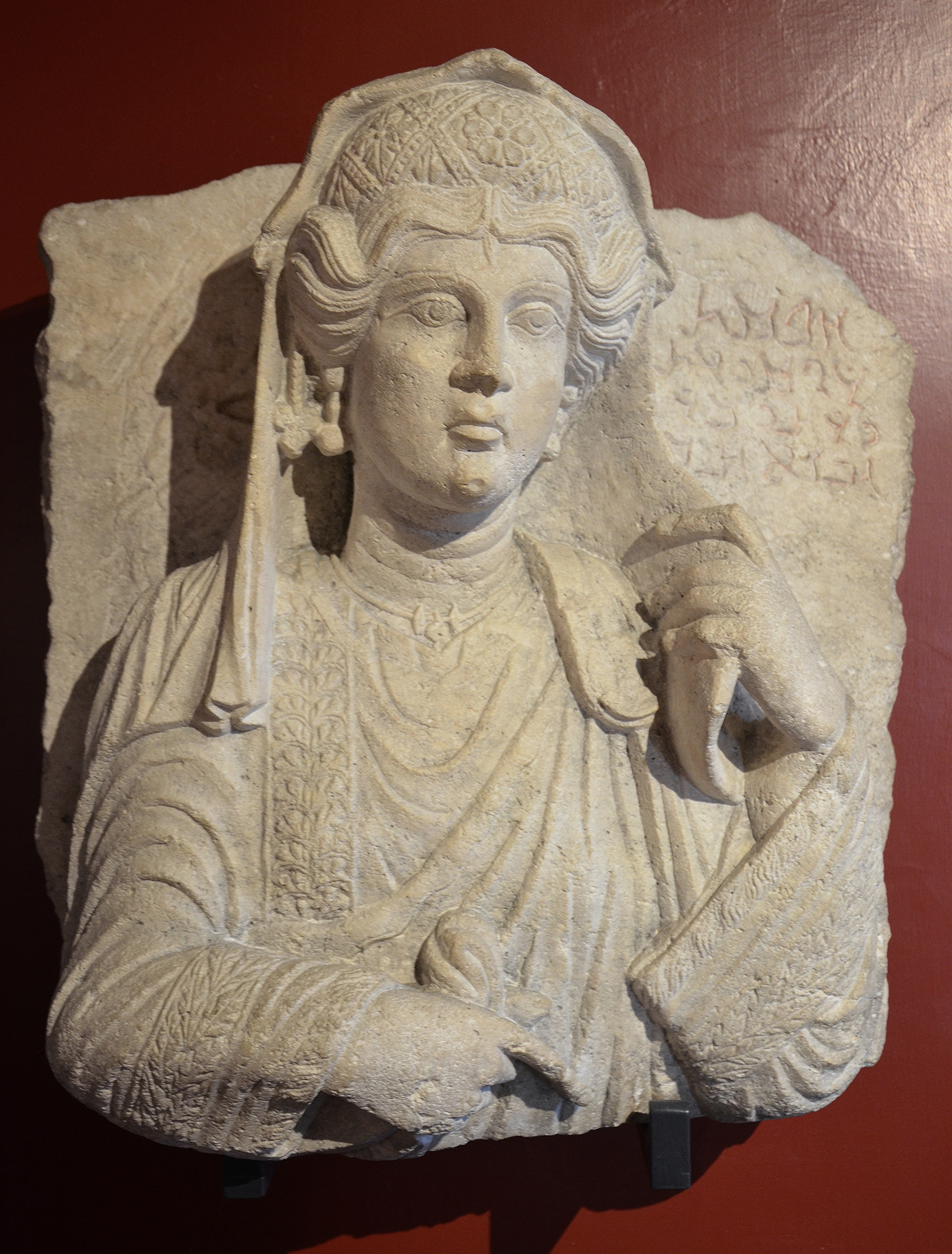
Bust of a veiled, bejeweled woman from the 3rd century AD. Rome, Italy

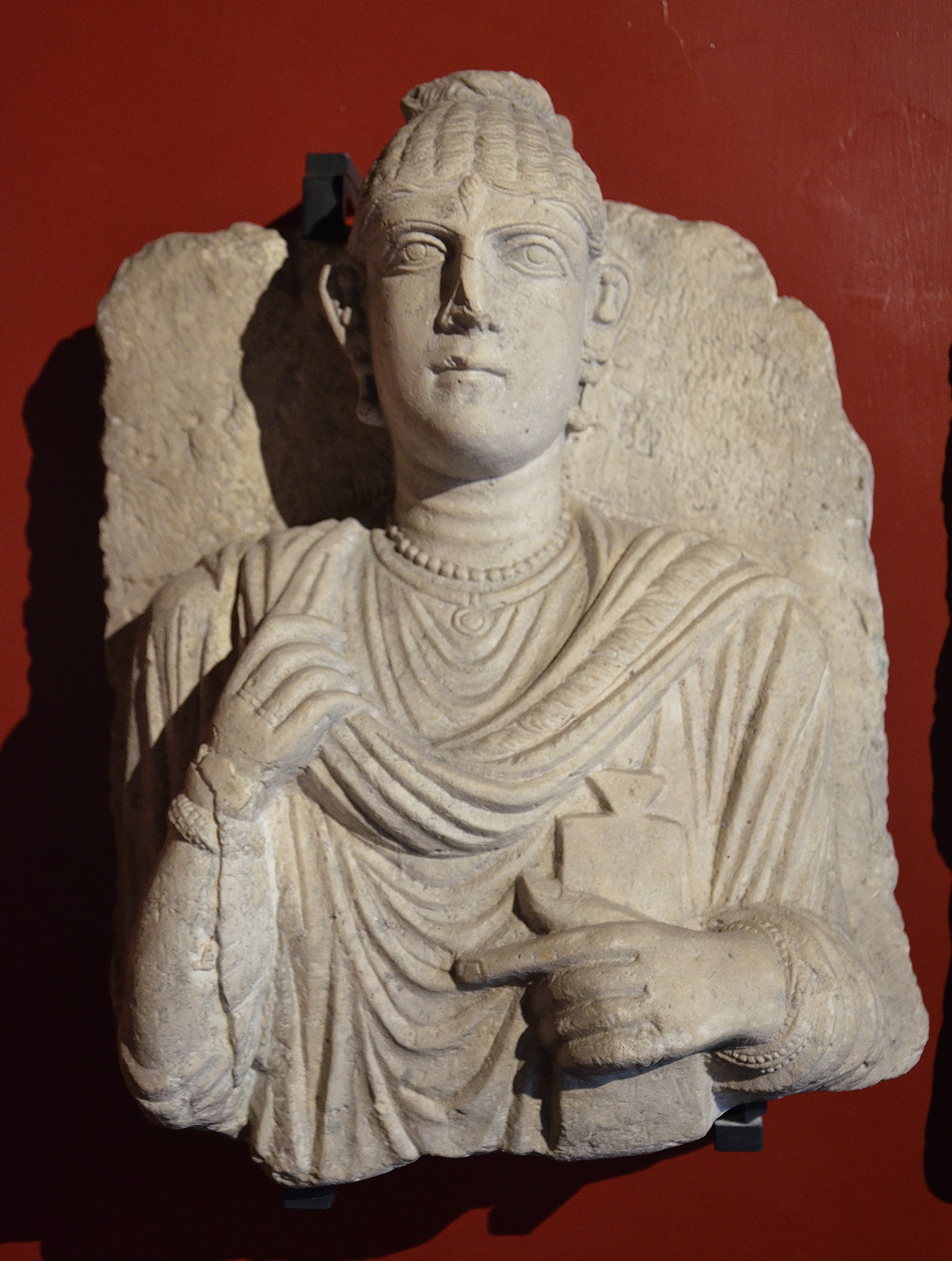
Bust from the 3rd century AD showing a fashionable woman holding a writing tablet in her hand. Rome, Italy

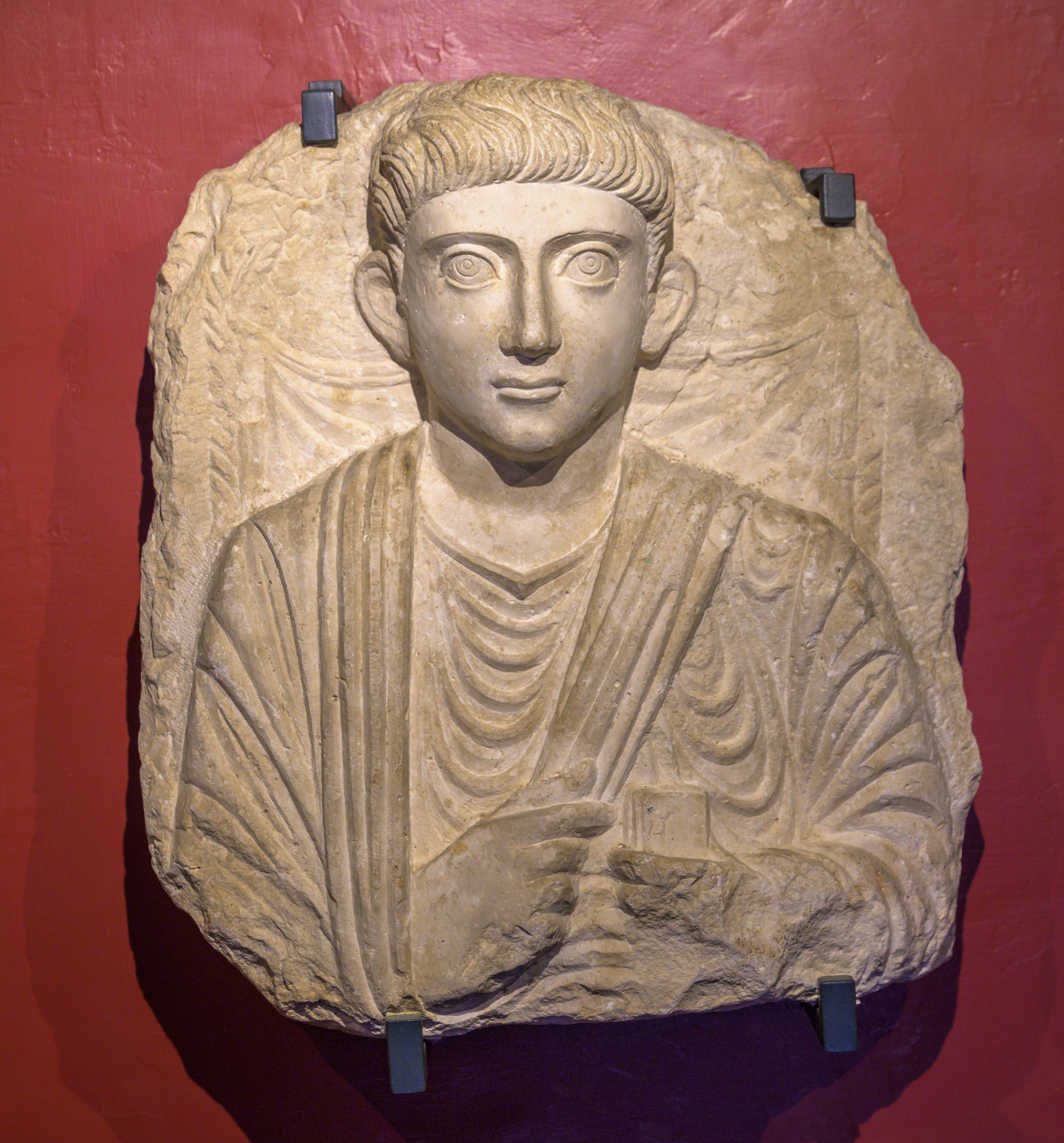
A Palmyrene man from the 2nd century AD. Rome, Italy

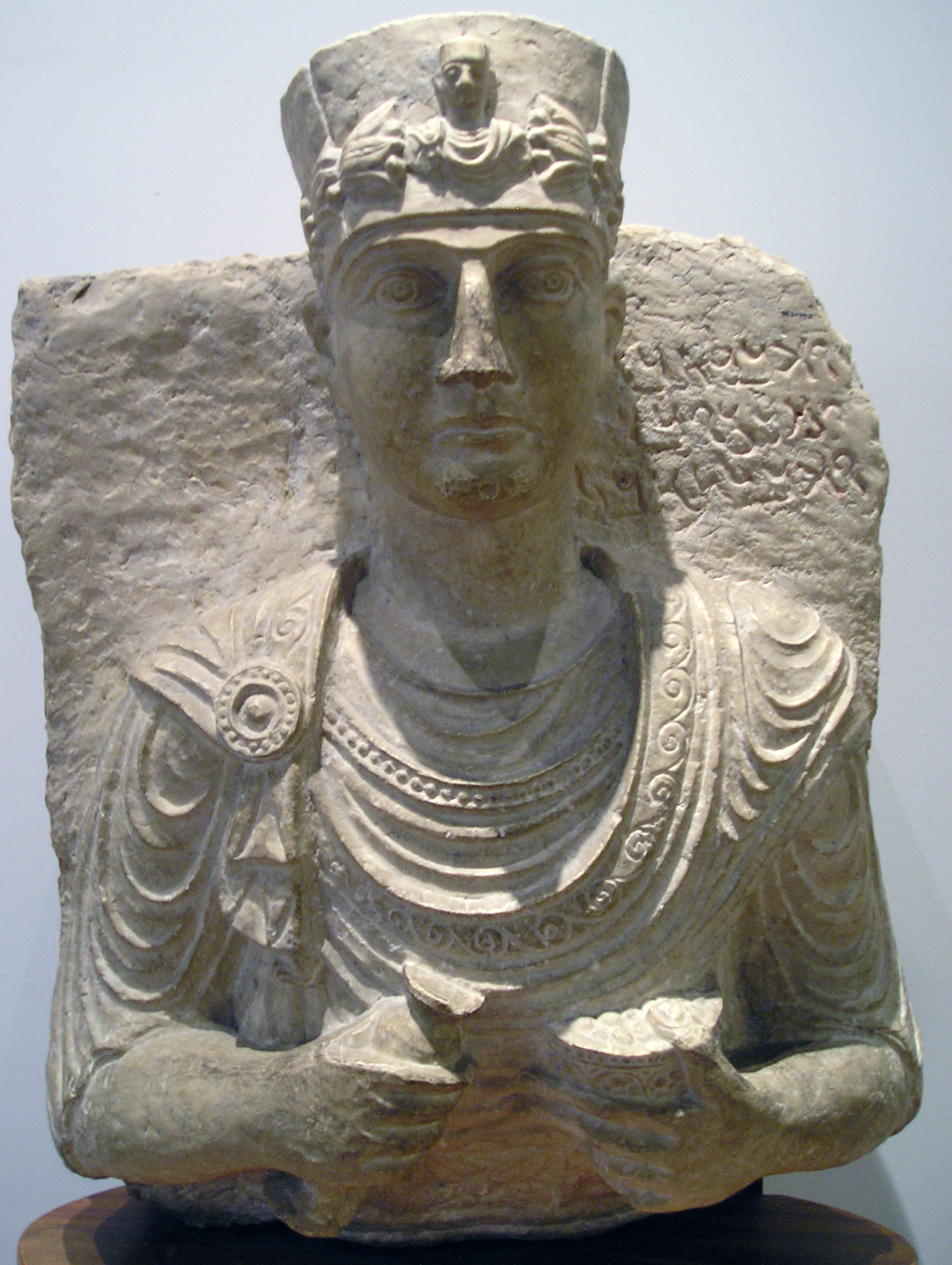
Relief of a priest from the 2nd century AD. Ontario, Canada

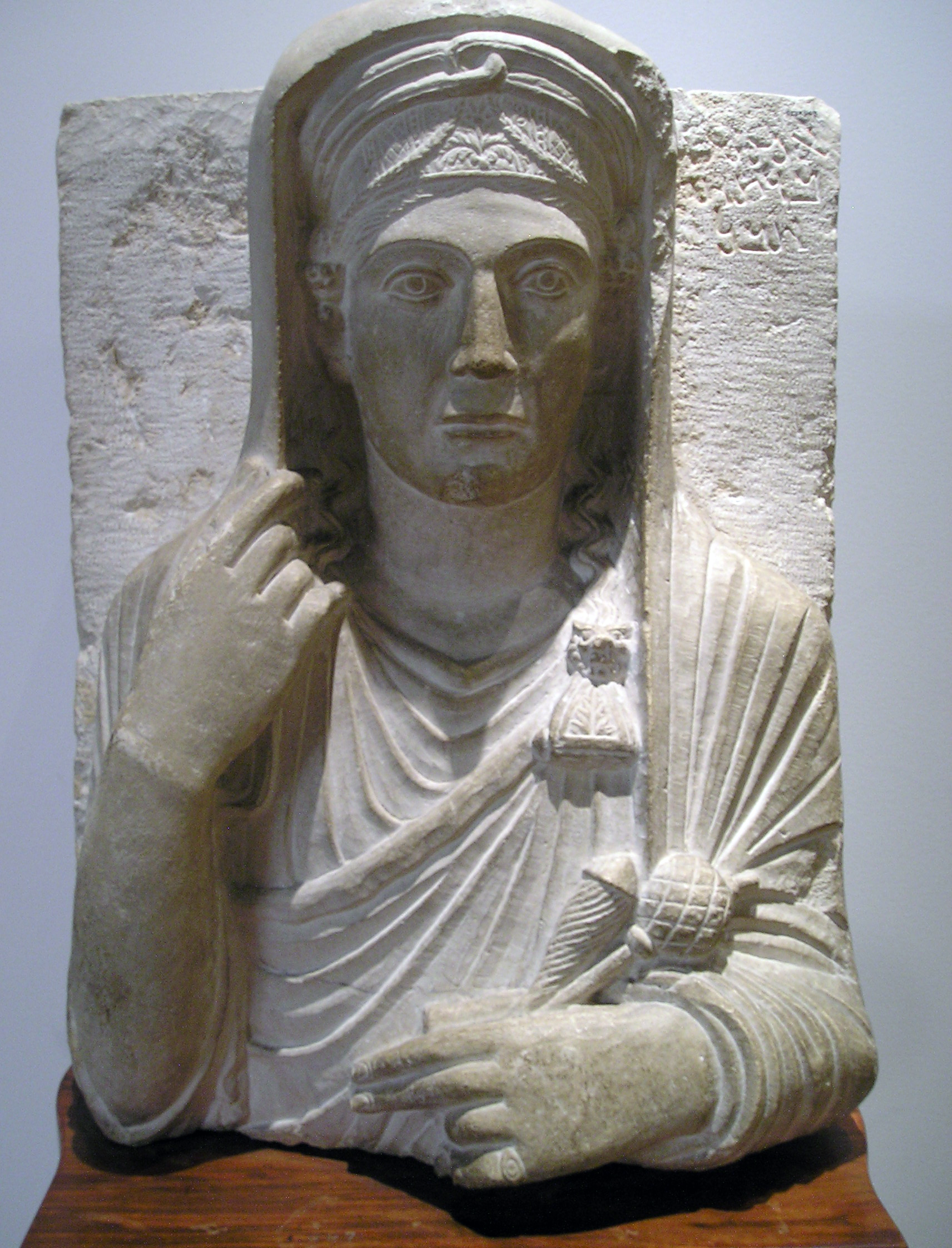
Relief of a veiled woman from the 2nd century AD. Ontario, Canada

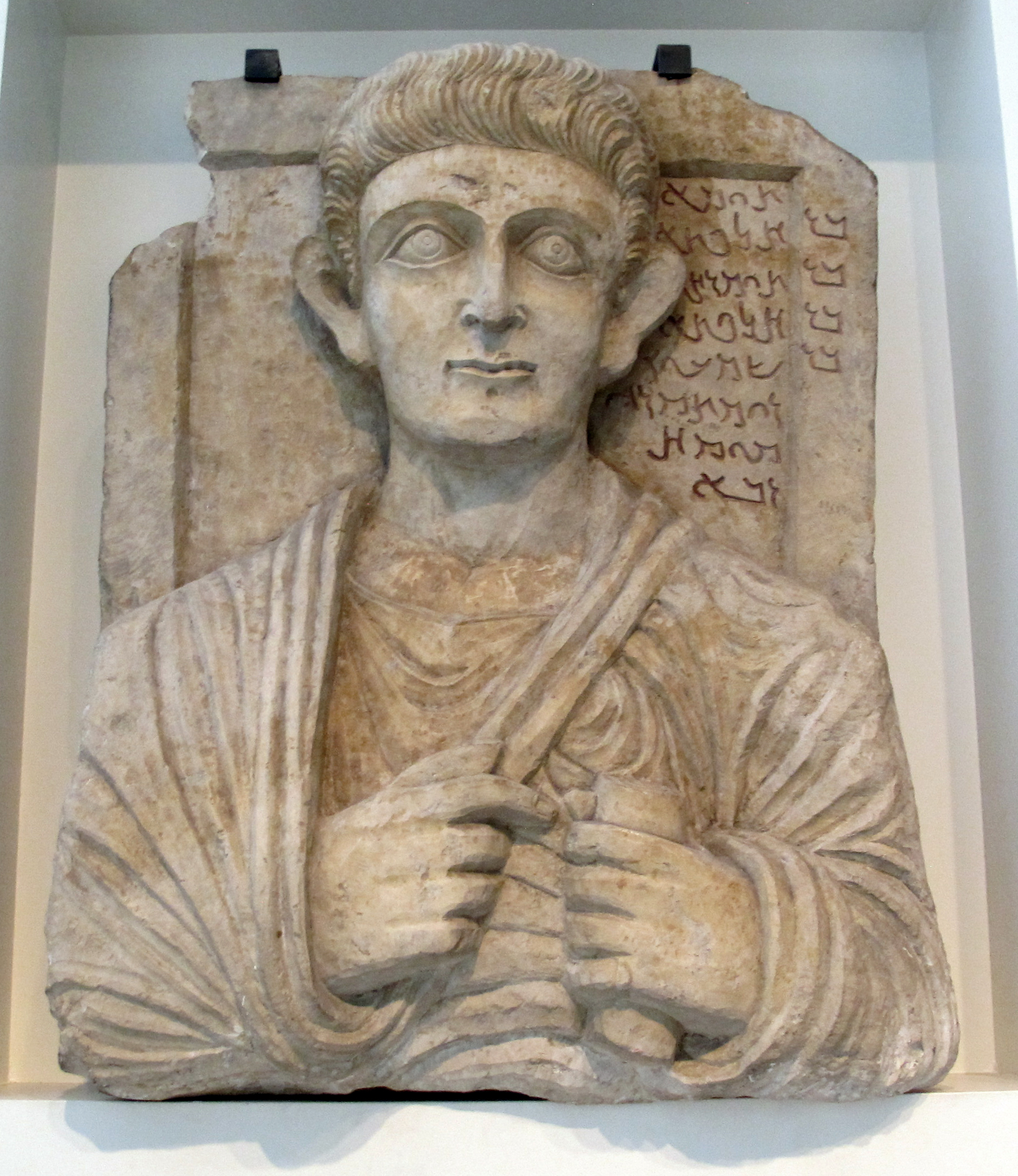
Relief of a man from the 2nd century AD. Geneve, Switzerland

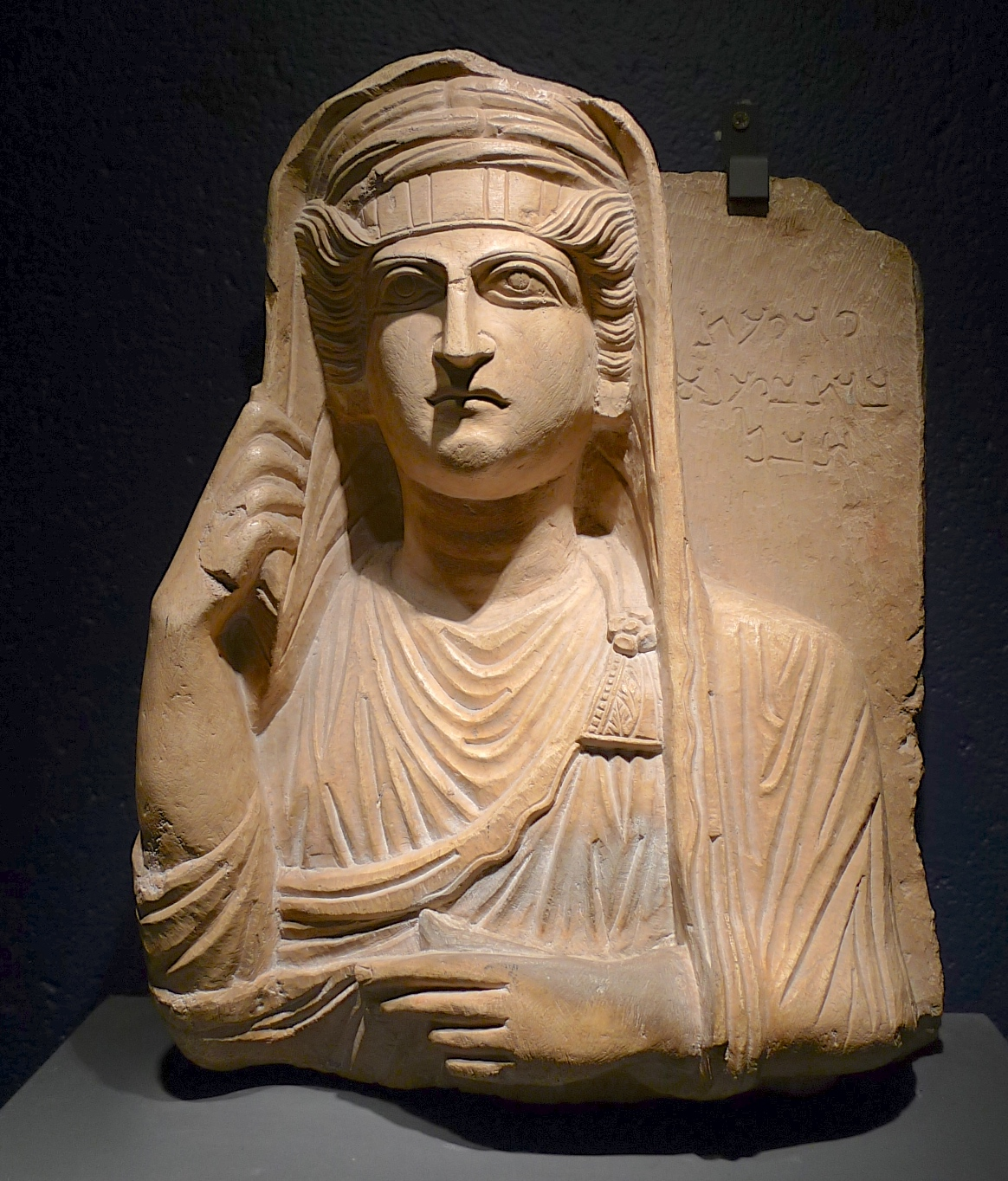
Funerary relief of a woman from the 2nd century AD. Brussels, Belgium

== Bibliography ==
- Ingholt, Harald [in Danish] (1928). Studier over palmyrensk skulptur. Udgivelsen bekostet af Ny Carlsbergfondet (in Norwegian). C.A. Reitzel.
- Bobou, Olympia; Vestergaard Jensen, Jesper; Breintoft Kristensen, Nathalia; Raja, Rubina; Randeris Thomsen, Rikke (2021). Studies on Palmyrene Sculpture: A Translation of Harald Ingholt’s Studier over Palmyrensk Skulptur, Edited and with Commentary. Turnhout, Belgium: Brepols Publishers. doi:10.1484/m.spah-eb.5.124226. ISBN 978-2-503-59124-7.
- Colledge, M.A.R. (1976). The Art of Palmyra. Studies in ancient art and archaeology. Westview Press. ISBN 978-0-89158-617-3.

== See also ==
- Palmyrene inscriptions
