= Hypogeum of Yarhai =

Underground tomb from Palmyra, Syria

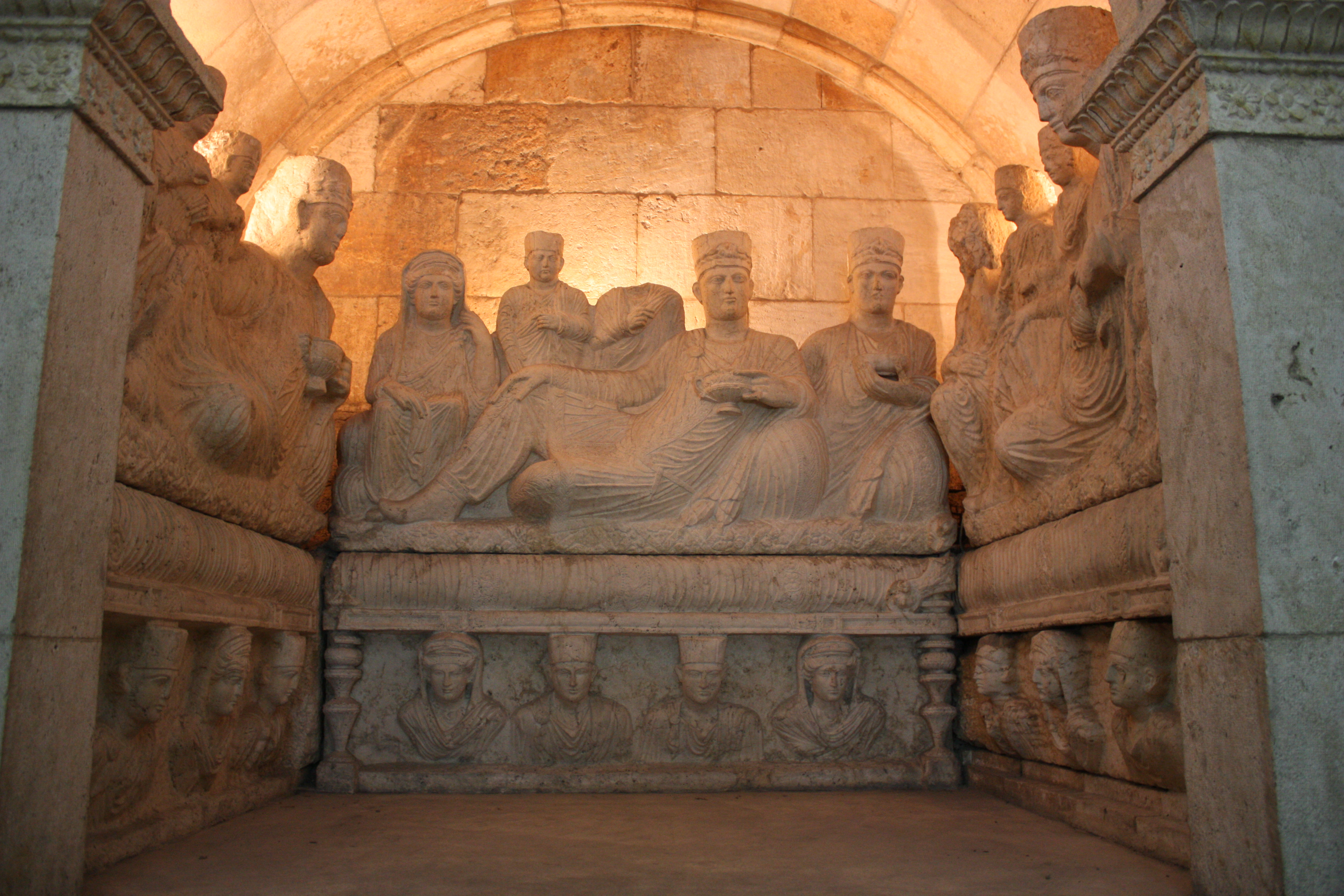
Detail from the hypogeum

The Hypogeum of Yarhai is a hypogeum (underground tomb) from the ancient Syrian city of Palmyra which flourished in the second and third centuries AD. It is considered one of the finest examples of Palmyrene funerary art. It is a mass grave which was built to contain the remains of the Yarhai family who commissioned it to be built in 108 AD.

The hypogeum was originally located in Palmyra's Valley of the Tombs before being excavated and restored. It was then moved to Damascus in 1935 and was later placed in its national museum.

Characteristic of most Palmyrene monuments, the ornate hypogeum is made of pale yellow limestone, and is sealed by two monolithic doors. At its center is a depiction of the deceased presiding over a funerary banquet to sustain them in their afterlife, while surrounding them, the walls display a set of funerary reliefs, characteristic of the city of Palmyra, depicting the members of the Yarhai family, with its women partly veiled to represent death, to seal the compartment shelves which contained their bodies.

== See also ==
- Palmyrene funerary reliefs
- Lion of Al-lāt
