= List of 2024 films based on actual events =

This is a list of films and miniseries released in 2024 that are based on actual events. All films on this list are from American production unless indicated otherwise.

== 2024 ==
- The 47 (Spanish: El 47) (2024) – Spanish drama film about Manolo Vital, a bus driver who challenged the authorities in 1978 Barcelona in a struggle for the dignity of a working-class neighborhood
- A Complete Unknown (2024) – biographical drama film about the controversy surrounding the switch to electrically amplified instrumentation by Bob Dylan
- A Very Royal Scandal (2024) – British thriller drama miniseries retelling Emily Maitlis' professional and personal journey leading up to the 2019 BBC television interview of Prince Andrew by Maitlis for BBC Two news and current affairs programme Newsnight
- Accident or Conspiracy: Godhra (Hindi: गोधरा) (2024) – Indian Hindi-language drama film based on the events surrounding the 2002 Godhra train fire in Gujarat, India, which later led to the 2002 Gujarat riots
- Ae Watan Mere Watan (Hindi: ऐ वतन मेरे वतन) (2024) – Indian Hindi-language historical biographical film based on the life of Usha Mehta, a brave young girl who starts an underground radio station to spread the message of unity, setting off a thrilling chase with the British authorities during the Quit India movement
- Amar Singh Chamkila (Hindi: अमर सिंह चमकिला) (2024) – Indian Hindi-language biographical drama film based on the life of musician Amar Singh Chamkila
- Amaran (Tamil: அமரன்) (2024) – Indian Tamil-language biographical action war film based on the life of Major Mukund Varadarajan, an Indian Army officer who was posthumously awarded the Ashoka Chakra, India's highest peacetime gallantry award, for his bravery in a counter-terrorism operation in Jammu and Kashmir in 2014
- The Apprentice (2024) – biographical drama film that examines Donald Trump's career as a real estate businessman in New York City in the 1970s and 1980s, as well as his relationship with attorney Roy Cohn
- Arthur the King (2024) – adventure film the captain of an adventure racing team befriends a wounded stray dog named Arthur, who accompanies the team on a grueling 435-mile (700-km) endurance race through the Dominican Republic
- Aserb: The Squadron (Arabic: السرب) (2024) – Egyptian action film based on true events of the Egyptian National Security Agency's response to the 2015 kidnapping and beheading of Copts in Libya
- The Asunta Case (Spanish: El caso Asunta) (2024) – Spanish crime thriller miniseries based on the murder of Asunta Basterra
- Atatürk II 1881 – 1919 (2024) – Turkish epic historical drama film following the life of the founding father of the Republic of Turkey, Mustafa Kemal Atatürk from 1881 – 1919
- Baby Reindeer (2024) – British thriller drama miniseries following the writer and performer Richard Gadd's warped relationship with his female stalker and the impact it has on him as he is ultimately forced to face a deep, dark buried trauma
- Back to Black (2024) – British biographical musical drama film based on the life of British singer-songwriter Amy Winehouse
- Bardejov (2024) – historical war film telling the true story of small town Jewish leader Rafuel Lowy, who found an ingenious way to save Bardejov's Jewish population from being sent to Auschwitz during World War Two
- Bau: Artist at War (2024) – biographical romantic drama film chronicling Holocaust survivor Joseph Bau's imprisonment in the Kraków-Płaszów concentration camp during World War II, and his subsequent relationship and wedding with Rebecca
- Beautiful Rebel (Italian: Sei nell'anima) (2024) – Italian biographical film about the life and career of Gianna Nannini
- Becoming Karl Lagerfeld (2024) – French biographical drama miniseries following the rise of Karl Lagerfeld through the world of haute couture in 1970s Paris, telling the story of both his career in high fashion and personal relationships
- Being Maria (French: Maria) (2024) – French biographical drama film dramatizing actress Maria Schneider's experiences working on Bernardo Bertolucci's feature film Last Tango in Paris
- Better Man (2024) – biographical drama film about the British pop singer Robbie Williams
- The Big Cigar (2024) – biographical thriller miniseries following the events of the Black Panther Party in the 1970s, the series is about party founder Huey P. Newton escaping from the Federal Bureau of Investigation (FBI) to Cuba with the help of Bert Schneider for an elaborate plan
- The Blood Brothers (2024) – Philippine biographical thriller film telling of Philippine history before Islam being told from the perspective of two indigenous brothers in Mindanao and how the education of the other drove a wedge between them and served as a catalyst to their cultural differences
- Blood'less' Revolution (Portuguese: Revolução sem sangue) (2024) – Portuguese historical drama film portraying events surrounding the Carnation Revolution of 1974
- Bob Marley: One Love (2024) – biographical musical drama film based on the life Jamaican reggae singer and songwriter Bob Marley, from his rise to fame up until his death in the early 1980s
- Boléro (2024) – French-Belgian biographical film about the life of musical composer Maurice Ravel during his preparation of Boléro, as commissioned by Ida Rubinstein
- Boneyard (2024) – crime thriller film based on the West Mesa murders
- Bonhoeffer (2024) – historical thriller drama film about the German theologian and anti-Nazi dissident Dietrich Bonhoeffer
- Bosco (2024) – biographical drama film based on the true story of Quawntay "Bosco" Adams who was sentenced to 35 years in 2004 for possession of marijuana
- Cabrini (2024) – biographical drama film depicting the life of Catholic missionary Francesca Cabrini as she encounters resistance to her charity and business efforts in New York City
- Chabuca (2024) – Peruvian biographical drama film based on the life of Peruvian actor and drag queen Ernesto Pimentel 'Chola Chabuca'
- Chandu Champion (Hindi: चंदू चैम्पियन) (2024) – Indian Hindi-language biographical sports drama film about India's first Paralympics gold medallist Murlikant Petkar
- Clipped (2024) – sports drama miniseries it focuses on the downfall of Los Angeles Clippers owner Donald Sterling, amid the team's drive to win a championship under coach Doc Rivers
- The Correspondent (2024) – Australian biographical legal thriller film about journalist Peter Greste during the detention of Al Jazeera journalists in Egypt
- Cristóbal Balenciaga (2024) – Spanish biographical miniseries about Spanish fashion designer Cristóbal Balenciaga
- Daughter of the Nation (Czech: Dcera národa) (2024) – Czech romantic historical miniseries telling the story of Zdeňka Havlíčková, daughter of Karel Havlíček Borovský
- The Deliverance (2024) – supernatural horror thriller film is based on the Latoya Ammons family possession
- The Devil's Bath (German: Des Teufels Bad) (2024) – German-Austrian historical horror film based on historical records and a real, unknown story of European (women's) history, the film is a deep portrait of a person who is hopeful, desperate, seeking and finally runs away from her inner prison
- Dharmaveer 2 (Marathi: धर्मवीर २) (2024) – Indian Marathi-language biographical political drama film delving into the life of Anand Dighe
- Disco, Ibiza, Locomía (2024) – Spanish-Mexican biographical musical drama film based on the musical ensemble Locomía
- Don't Let's Go to the Dogs Tonight (2024) – South African drama film based on the experiences of Alexandra Fuller's White Zimbabwean family following the Rhodesian Bush War
- Escape from Germany (2024) – historical drama film based on the true story of 79 American missionaries from the Church of Jesus Christ of Latter-Day Saints get stranded inside Nazi Germany on the eve of outbreak of WWII
- The Featherweight (2024) – biographical sports drama film about professional boxer Willie Pep
- Feud: Capote vs. The Swans (2024) – drama miniseries about writer Truman Capote and his ruined relationship with the Swans, a socialite group of New York City high society when Capote revealed intimate and scandalous secrets about his friends in an Esquire article
- Fight Night: The Million Dollar Heist (2024) – crime drama miniseries fictionalizing an actual armed robbery at an Atlanta party on the night of Muhammad Ali's October 1970 comeback fight, after being stripped of his boxing license in 1967 for being a conscientious objector to fighting in the Vietnam War
- Firefighters (2024) – South Korean drama film based on the Hongje-dong arson incident in 2001
- The Fire Inside (2024) – biographical sports film about American professional boxer Claressa "T-Rex" Shields training for the 2012 Summer Olympics
- The Firing Squad (2024) – adventure drama film inspired by the story of Andrew Chan and Myuran Sukumaran, members of the Bali Nine
- The Flood (French: Le Déluge) (2024) – French historical drama film about Louis XVI and Marie Antoinette at the end of their reign
- Franklin (2024) – biographical historical drama miniseries about the United States Founding Father Benjamin Franklin
- From Hilde, with Love (German: In Liebe, Eure Hilde) (2024) – German biographical drama film about Hilde Coppi, who along with her husband Hans Coppi belonged to Red Orchestra, a German resistance group to Nazism
- The Girl with the Needle (Danish: Pigen med nålen) (2024) – Danish historical psychological horror film loosely based on the true story of Danish serial killer Dagmar Overbye, who manipulated impoverished mothers into leaving their unwanted children in her care, as adoptees, and subsequently murdered them
- The Goat Life (Malayalam: ആടുജീവിതം) (2024) – Indian Malayalam-language survival drama film based on the real-life story of Najeeb, a Malayali immigrant laborer, one among thousands of Indians who were forced into slavery in Saudi Arabia as goatherds on secluded farms in the deserts by the native Arabs
- Gold (2024) – Malaysian biographical sports drama film based on Cheah Liek Hou's journey on winning gold medal in 2020 Paralympic Games in badminton (category SU5)
- The Good Teacher (French: Pas de Vagues) (2024) – French drama film about a high school teacher who is wrongfully accused of sexual harassment by one of his students, a teenage girl, and must fight to prove his innocence inspired by a true story that happened to Teddy Lussi-Modeste in 2020
- The Great Ambition (Italian: Berlinguer. La grande ambiente) (2024) – Italian biographical drama film about politician Enrico Berlinguer, who led the Italian Communist Party from 1972 to 1984
- The Great Lillian Hall (2024) – drama television film loosely inspired by American stage actress Marian Seldes
- Griselda (2024) – biographical crime miniseries about Griselda Blanco, the notorious Colombian drug lord
- Harbin (Korean: 하얼빈) (2024) – South Korean biographical historical drama film about Ahn Jung-geun, a Korean independence activist who assassinated Itō Hirobumi, the first Prime Minister of Japan, in 1909
- Hijacking (2024) – South Korean disaster film based on the hijack attempt of a Korean Air F27 airliner in 1971
- Holy Mother (Spanish: La abadesa) (2024) – Spanish historical drama film inspired by the life of Emma of Barcelona
- House of Ga'a (2024) – Nigerian historical drama film delving into the tumultuous ascent to power of a ruthless Prime Minister (Bashorun Ga'a) consumed by vengeance who stops at nothing to eclipse the kings he once served
- I'm Nevenka (Spanish: Soy Nevenka) (2024) – Spanish drama film about the sexual harassment of young municipal councillor Nevenka Fernández by her boss, the Ponferrada Mayor Ismael Álvarez
- I'm Still Here (Portuguese: Ainda Estou Aqui ) (2024) – Brazilian political biographical drama film about Eunice Paiva, a mother and activist coping with the forced disappearance of her husband, the dissident politician Rubens Paiva, during the military dictatorship in Brazil
- IC 814: The Kandahar Hijack (2024) – Indian Hindi-language crime thriller miniseries about the hijacking of Indian Airlines Flight 814 in 1999
- In Her Place (Spanish: El lugar de la otra) (2024) – Chilean historical crime drama film based on the true story of writer María Carolina Geel, who in 1955 killed her lover at the Crillón Hotel
- The Inheritance of Flora (Spanish: La herencia de Flora) (2024) – Peruvian biographical historical drama film telling the story of Flora Tristan
- Intoxicated by Love (Persian: مست عشق; Turkish: Mevlana Mest-i Aşk) (2024) – Iranian-Turkish historical romantic drama film depicting the life and career of the 13th-century Persian poet Mawlana and his relationship with Shams Tabrizi
- Joan (2024) – British biographical drama miniseries about real-life character Joan Hannington, a figure known as "the Godmother" by certain aspects of the British criminal underworld
- Joy (2024) – British biographical drama film depicting the true story of the world's first in vitro fertilisation baby Louise Brown
- Kasoombo (Gujarati: કાસૂમ્બો) (2024) – Indian Gujarati-language historical drama film about Alauddin Khilji's invasion of Gujarat
- Kidnapped: The Chloe Ayling Story (2024) – British biographical crime miniseries based on the true life kidnapping of British model Chloe Ayling
- Kneecap (2024) – British-Irish comedy drama film depicting the rise of Belfast-based hip-hop trio, Kneecap
- Komandir (Russian: Командир) (2024) – Russian biographical action film depiciting events surrounding the 1988 Ordzhonikidze bus hijacking
- The Legend of the Last Inca (Spanish: Los indomables) (2024) – Peruvian historical drama film following the rebellion of the Amaru-Kataristas Aymara organized by Sapa Inca and Gregoria Apaza against the Spanish conquerors for the liberation of the indigenous population
- Limonov: The Ballad (2024) – French-Italian-Spanish biographical drama film about the Russian dissident writer and politician Eduard Limonov, who founded the National Bolshevik Party
- Lisabi: The Uprising (2024) – Nigerian historical drama film loosely based on the historic 18th-century Lisabi Rebellion of Abeokuta
- Maharaj (Hindi: महाराज) (2024) – Indian Hindi-language historical crime drama film based on the Maharaj Libel Case of 1862
- Maidaan (Hindi: मैदान) (2024) – Indian Hindi-language biographical sport drama film telling the story of Syed Abdul Rahim, a pioneering football coach in India between 1952 and 1962
- Majnoon (Persian: مجنون) (2024) – Iranian biographical telling the story of the life of Mehdi Zeinoddin
- Main Atal Hoon (Hindi: मैं अटल हूं) (2024) – Indian Hindi-language biographical drama film following the life and political career of India's leader Atal Bihari Vajpayee
- Manhunt (2024) – historical drama miniseries following Edwin Stanton's search for John Wilkes Booth in the aftermath of Abraham Lincoln's assassination
- Manyam Dheerudu (Telugu: మన్యం ధీరుడు) (2024) – Indian Telugu-language biographical film on the life of the famous Telugu freedom fighter Alluri Sitarama Raju
- Marco, the Invented Truth (Spanish: Marco, la verdad inventada) (2024) – Spanish biographical thriller film following the life of CNT secretary general and imposter Enric Marco, who built himself a fake past as a Nazi concentration camp survivor, gaining public recognition and sympathy
- Maria (2024) – biographical psychological drama film about opera singer Maria Callas
- Mary & George (2024) – British historical drama miniseries exploring the complex relationship between James VI and I and George Villiers, 1st Duke of Buckingham
- Masters of the Air (2024) – war drama miniseries following the actions of the 100th Bomb Group, a B-17 Flying Fortress unit in the Eighth Air Force during World War II; the unit was nicknamed the "Bloody Hundredth" due to the heavy losses it suffered in combat missions
- Meeting with Pol Pot (French: Rendez-vous avec Pol Pot) (2024) – French-Cambodian drama film about three French journalists travel to Cambodia in 1978 after receiving an invitation from the Khmer Rouge regime, embarking on a perilous adventure, based on true events
- Midas Man (2024) – British biographical drama film about the life of music entrepreneur Brian Epstein, who managed the Beatles
- The Ministry of Ungentlemanly Warfare (2024) – British-American spy action comedy film portraying a heavily fictionalised version of Operation Postmaster
- Modì, Three Days on the Wing of Madness (Italian: Modì – Tre giorni sulle ali della follia) (2024) – biographical drama film based on the life of Italian artist Amedeo Modigliani
- Monsieur Aznavour (2024) – French-Belgian musical biographical drama film about the life of French singer Charles Aznavour, from his beginning as the son of Armenian immgants to the rise of his career as a singer and actor which cemented his status as a beloved figure in France
- Monsters: The Lyle and Erik Menendez Story (2024) – biographical crime drama miniseries centring on the 1989 murders of José and Kitty Menendez, who were killed by their sons, Lyle and Erik
- Mr Bates vs The Post Office (2024) – British biographical drama miniseries depicting a re-telling of the British Post Office scandal
- My Penguin Friend (2024) – American-Brazilian family adventure film based on the true story of fisherman João Pereira de Souza and Dindim the penguin, which went viral in 2016
- Nahir (2024) – Argentine crime drama film based on the Nahir Galarza case, the 19-year-old Argentine girl sentenced to life imprisonment for the crime of her boyfriend Fernando Pastorizzo's murder
- Never Alone (Finnish: Ei koskaan yksin) (2024) – Finnish historical drama film about Finnish-Jewish businessman Abraham Stiller who tried to use all his means to save Jews from being captured by the Gestapo
- Nickel Boys (2024) – historical drama film inspired by the historic reform school in Florida called the Dozier School for Boys, which was notorious for abusive treatment of students
- The Night They Came Home (2024) – Western thriller about a US Marshall who partners with Native Americans to hunt down the Rufus Buck Gang in the Indian Territory, inspired by true events
- Niki (2024) – French biographical film following Niki de Saint Phalle from her early days as a young mother and aspiring model in the United States during the time of McCarthyism and her escape to France, where she is haunted by memories of the past
- Number 24 (2024) – Norwegian biographical drama film about the Norwegian resistance fighter Gunnar Sønsteby
- Oh Country, My Country (Hindi: ऐ वतन मेरे वतन) (2024) – Indian Hindi-language historical biographical film about India's struggle for freedom in 1942, based on the life of Usha Mehta, a brave young girl who starts an underground radio station to spread the message of unity, setting off a thrilling chase with the British authorities during the Quit India movement
- The Order (2024) – action thriller film revolves around an FBI agent who goes after a white supremacist terrorist group known as the Order that was active in the United States in the 1980s
- Ordinary Angels (2024) – drama film based on true events that transpired during the 1994 North American cold wave
- Padatik (Bengali: পদাতিক) (2024) – Indian Bengali-language biographical drama film focusing on Mrinal Sen's active lifetime and his contribution in the Bengali Cinema
- The Partisan (2024) – Polish-French-British biographical spy thriller film about a Polish agent of the British Special Operations Executive during the Second World War, Krystyna Skarbek
- The Prosecutor (2024) – Hong Kong-Chinese action thriller film adapted from a Hong Kong 2016 drug-trafficking miscarriage of justice where the defense lawyer and legal executive misled their client, Ma Ka-Kin, to exonerate the second defendant.
- Putin (2024) – Polish biographical drama film about the life of Russian president Vladímir Putin from the age of ten, through sixty years of many events in his real life
- Queer (2024) – period romantic drama film set in 1940s Mexico City, it follows William Lee who, after fleeing from a drug bust in New Orleans, wanders around the city's clubs and becomes infatuated with drug user Allerton, a discharged American Navy serviceman
- Quisling: The Final Days (Norwegian: Quislings siste dager) (2024) – Norwegian historical drama film following the final days of Vidkun Quisling before his execution in October 1945
- Race for Glory: Audi vs. Lancia (2024) – British-Italian sport thriller film depicting the rivalry between Roland Gumpert's team driving the Audi Quattro and the team of Cesare Fiorio in the Lancia 037 rally car at the 1983 World Rally Championship
- Razakar (Telugu: రజాకార్) (2024) – Indian Telugu-language epic historical action film based on the events leading to Annexation of Hyderabad in the erstwhile Princely state of Hyderabad
- Reagan (2024) – biographical historical drama film follows Ronald Reagan's life from his childhood to his years as president of the United States, told by a former KGB agent
- The Red Virgin (Spanish: La virgen roja) (2024) – Spanish drama film about the relationship between Aurora Rodríguez and her daughter Hildegart
- Rob Peace (2024) – biographical drama film about an intellectually brilliant young African-American man, Robert DeShaun Peace, who left Newark, New Jersey to attend Yale University, but fell back into the streets when he returned to Newark and was murdered, aged 30, "face down, knees bent", in a drug-related shooting – based on the biography The Short and Tragic Life of Robert Peace by Jeff Hobbs
- Saturday Night (2024) – biographical comedy-drama film about the night of the 1975 premiere of NBC's Saturday Night, later known as Saturday Night Live
- Saturn Return (Spanish: Segundo premio) (2024) – French-Spanish musical drama film based on the troubled years for indie pop band Los Planetas in the 1990s
- Satyashodhak (Marathi: सत्यशोधक) (2024) – Indian Marathi-language biographical film depicting the life of Mahatma Jyotirao Phule
- Say Nothing (2024) – historical drama miniseries following the lives of people growing up in Belfast in the 1970s, 80s and 90s during the Troubles, as well as their involvement in the Provisional Irish Republican Army, and inquiries into the Disappeared and particularly the murder of Jean McConville
- Scoop (2024) – British biographical drama film depicting a dramatic retelling of the process of securing the 2019 BBC television interview of Prince Andrew by presenter and journalist Emily Maitlis and the production team at BBC Two news and current affairs programme Newsnight
- See You in Another Life (Spanish: Nos vemos en otra vida) (2024) – Spanish crime drama miniseries set against the backdrop of the procurement of explosives for the 11M train bombings
- Senna (2024) – Brazilian biographical drama miniseries based on the life of Formula One racing driver Ayrton Senna from the beginning of his racing career in Formula Ford to the 1994 San Marino Grand Prix
- September 5 (2024) – historical drama film recounts the Munich massacre from the perspective of the ABC Sports crew and their coverage of the events
- Shirley (2024) – biographical drama film it depicts the failed 1972 presidential run of Shirley Chisholm, who was already the first Black woman to be elected to the United States Congress
- Shivrayancha Chhava (Marathi: शिवरायांचा छावा) (2024) – Indian Marathi-language historical drama film about Chhatrapati Sambhaji Maharaj, the second Chhatrapati of the Maratha Empire, who ruled from 1681 to 1689
- Simona Kossak (2024) – Polish biographical drama film about scientist and ecologist, Simona Kossak
- The Six Triple Eight (2024) – war drama film based on the 2019 WWII History magazine article, "Fighting a Two-Front War", by Kevin M. Hymel on the contributions of the 6888th Central Postal Directory Battalion, an all-Black and all-female battalion, in World War II
- Sleeping with a Tiger (German: Mit einem Tiger schlafen) (2024) – Austrian biographical film telling the story about the artist Maria Lassnig
- So Long, Marianne (2024) – biographical drama miniseries of the romantic relationship between Marianne Ihlen and Leonard Cohen
- Sound of Hope: The Story of Possum Trot (2024) – drama film follows Donna & Reverend Maryin as they ignite a fire in the hearts of their rural church to embrace kids in foster care that no one else would take in, based on a true story
- Srikanth (Hindi: श्री) (2024) – Indian Hindi-language biographical film on the life of Srikanth Bolla, a visually-impaired industrialist and the founder of Bollant Industries
- Swatantra Veer Savarkar (Hindi: स्वतंत्र वीर सावरकर) (2024) – Indian Hindi-language biographical film on the life of Vinayak Damodar Savarkar
- Thelma (2024) – comedy drama film inspired by the experience of director Josh Margolin's grandmother, Thelma Post, who was the victim of a phone scam
- Those About to Die (2024) – American-German-Italian epic sword-and-sandal miniseries chronicling the world of gladiators in Ancient Rome
- Toofan (2024) – Bangladeshi period crime action film inspired from the life of a gangster in Bangladesh in the 1990s
- Trap (2024) – psychological thriller film inspired in part by Operation Flagship
- Under the Bridge (2024) – crime thriller miniseries dramatizing the death of 14-year-old Reena Virk and the investigation that followed
- Undercover (Spanish: La infiltrada) (2024) – Spanish thriller film based on the true story of an undercover agent who infiltrated ETA under the name 'Aranzazu Berradre Marín' and managed to dismantle the 'Donosti' cell
- Unfrosted (2024) – comedy film loosely based on the true story of the creation of Pop-Tarts toaster pastries
- Unsinkable (2024) – historical drama film about the enquiries in the aftermath of the sinking of the RMS Titanic
- Unsung Hero (2024) – Christian drama film following Rebecca, Joel, and Luke Smallbone of For King & Country, and their life journey to become Christian recording artists
- Until I Kill You (2024) – British crime drama miniseries telling the harrowing true story of Delia Balmer, who survived a relationship with John Sweeney
- VC 571 (2024) – Indian Hindi-language biographical war film about VC Rifleman Gabar Singh Negi, a member of the Garhwal Rifles during World War I
- Vina: Before 7 Days (Indonesian: Vina: Sebelum 7 Hari) (2024) – Indonesian horror thriller film based on the true story of the murder of Muhamad Rizky Rudiana and Vina Dewi Arsita
- Vindication Swim (2024) – British biographical drama film about swimmer Mercedes Gleitze, who in 1927 became the first British woman to swim the English Channel
- Waltzing with Brando (2024) - biographical drama film about Marlon Brando creating a tropical getaway in Tahiti between the late 1960s and mid-1970s
- Waves (Czech: Vlny) (2024) – Czech-Slovak historical thriller film set during the Prague Spring and subsequent Warsaw Pact invasion of Czechoslovakia
- We Were the Lucky Ones (2024) – historical drama miniseries depicting the Holocaust from the perspective of the Kurc family, Polish Jews based on the 2017 book of the same name by Georgia Hunter, inspired by the story of her own family
- Whiskey on the Rocks (2024) – Swedish war comedy miniseries based on a real-life incident in which Soviet submarine S-363 became beached on Swedish soil during the Cold War
- William Tell (2024) – British-Italian-Swiss historical drama film focusing on the legendary Swiss marksman William Tell as part of the greater Swiss struggle for independence from the Habsburg Empire in the early 14th century
- Winner (2024) – American-Canadian black comedy film based on the life of Reality Winner who leaked an intelligence report about Russian interference in the 2016 United States elections
- Yatra 2 (Telugu: యాత్ర 2) (2024) – Indian Telugu-language biographical political drama film based on the padayatra of Jagan from 6 November 2017, to 9 January 2019, representing the YSR Congress Party for the 2019 Andhra Pradesh Legislative Assembly election
- Young Woman and the Sea (2024) – biographical sports film about Gertrude Ederle, an American competitive swimmer who became the first woman to swim across the English Channel
