= Esme Wren =

British broadcast journalist

Esme Wren is a British broadcast journalist who has worked for BBC News, Sky News and Channel 4 News. In 2021 she was appointed editor of Channel 4 News. Between 2018 and 2022, Wren was editor of BBC Newsnight, and oversaw Emily Maitlis's interview with the Duke of York in a special episode: Prince Andrew & the Epstein Scandal.

== Early life and education ==
Wren grew up in a Catholic family in Portsmouth with three sisters and two brothers. Wren attended Portsmouth Grammar School. She initially intended to go into dentistry, but switched her discipline, graduating from the University of Bristol in 1998 with a Bachelor of Science (BSc) in Politics. During her final year at Bristol, she won a Fulbright scholarship to study abroad at UCLA. She then completed a postgraduate degree in broadcast journalism at City, University of London in 1999.

== Career ==
Wren began her journalism career as a producer at Newsnight in the 1990s. She joined Sky News in 2005. She oversaw Sky News's coverage of the 2017 general election as its Head of Politics, Specialist and Business Journalism.

In 2018, Wren was appointed as editor of Newsnight, taking over from Ian Katz. In 2022, she became editor of Channel 4 News.

=== Interview with Prince Andrew ===
Wren led the Newsnight team as they negotiated, filmed and broadcast Prince Andrew's interview with Emily Maitlis in 2019. Wren was portrayed by two different actors in dramatic recreations of the events surrounding the interview: by Romola Garai in film Scoop, and by Lydia Leonard in the series A Very Royal Scandal.

Media offices
Preceded by Ian Katz	Editor: Newsnight; 2018–2022	Succeeded by Stewart Maclean
