= Thirsk (disambiguation) =

Thirsk may refer to:

- Thirsk, a town in North Yorkshire, England
  - Thirsk (UK Parliament constituency), a former constituency
- Thirsk (surname), people with the surname
- Thirsk Mead Hall, a location in The Elder Scrolls III: Bloodmoon and The Elder Scrolls V: Skyrim – Dragonborn
