= Einstein and Eddington =

2008 television film directed by Philip Martin

- BBC DVD cover, featuring Andy Serkis as Einstein (top) and David Tennant as Eddington (bottom)
- Written by: Peter Moffat
- Directed by: Philip Martin
- Starring: Andy Serkis; David Tennant; Lucy Cohu; Jim Broadbent; Rebecca Hall
- Theme music composer: Nicholas Hooper
- Country of origin: United Kingdom
- Original language: English

Production
- Producer: Mark Pybus
- Running time: 89 minutes
- Production company: Company Pictures

Original release
- Network: BBC Two
- Release: 22 November 2008

Einstein and Eddington is a British single drama produced by Company Pictures and the BBC, in association with HBO. It featured David Tennant as British scientist Sir Arthur Stanley Eddington, and Andy Serkis as Albert Einstein. It tells the story of Einstein's general theory of relativity, his relationship with Eddington and the introduction of this theory to the world, against the backdrop of the Great War and Eddington's eclipse observations.

It was first broadcast on BBC Two on 22 November 2008.

== Plot ==
In 1914, at the outbreak of the First World War, Eddington is appointed chief astronomer at Cambridge by Sir Oliver Lodge and instructed to research Einstein's work and defend the Newtonian status quo. Meanwhile, Einstein is lured back from Zürich to the Prussian Academy of Sciences in Berlin in an attempt to aid the war effort by embarrassing Britain by disproving the work of its great scientist Isaac Newton.

A Quaker and therefore unable to go to war, Eddington sets out to bid farewell to his love interest William Marston, as the latter goes off to war as an officer, but just misses Marston's train. He then presents his lecture to his fellow astronomers at the university—defending Newton, but still thinking Einstein might be right—and takes the German Müller family into his home after saving them from a violent anti-German mob. When Einstein's wife arrives in Berlin, she discovers Einstein's affair with his cousin Elsa and leaves him, whilst Eddington faces down protesters who despise his status as a conscientious objector. Einstein arrives late at a demonstration of Fritz Haber's poison gas and is so disgusted by this application of science to murder that he rejects an offer to convert his citizenship back from Swiss to German and refuses to sign the "Manifesto to the Civilized World", a list of prominent German scientists, artists and academics supporting the war.

Eddington finds his research into Einstein's work obstructed by a British ban on the circulation of German scientific literature. Realising that Mercury's orbit is precessing slightly more than it should be according to Newton's laws, he writes to Einstein despite the ban to inquire into his view on the problem. On receiving Eddington's letter, Einstein starts work on this new avenue with Max Planck, whilst consoling colleague Planck on the loss of his son in the war despite Einstein's lack of belief in a human-like God or an afterlife. They find that Einstein's work agrees with Mercury's orbit where Newton's does not, and send this reply back to Eddington.

Meanwhile, Eddington grieves over Marston, among the 15,000 killed by German use of chlorine gas at the Second Battle of Ypres, causing doubts in his faith, but leading him to fight all the more loudly against an expulsion of German scientists from the Royal Society. The expulsion has been initiated by Lodge, whose son was also among the killed and who clings to Newton as a consolation of "order in the universe", but Eddington cannot admit to Lodge that he too is grieving for a loved one.

News of the gas attack also leads Einstein to an outburst against his fellow scientists, which leads to his being cut off from the university, and—overworking—he falls sick and Elsa leaves him. Even so, he completes his work on general relativity and on how starlight bends and gets this result through to Eddington via Planck. Eddington realises he can prove that space and light are being bent by observing the solar eclipse of 29 May 1919 on the west African island of Príncipe, and with Dyson as an ally, gains funding for his expedition, despite Lodge's initial opposition. As the war ends, Eddington's sister and housekeeper, Winifred, sets off to help the Quaker relief effort in war-shattered Germany despite her fears as to Eddington's waning faith.

In 1919, Eddington's expedition in Príncipe is delayed by bad weather until the last moment, while Einstein briefly returns to his ex-wife and children. Bringing back two photographs from the eclipse to compare to photographs of the night sky in normal conditions, Eddington compares them in public, with Lodge and Winifred in attendance, and not only proves Einstein right but also finds this confirmation reaffirming his faith—as he states, "I can hear God, thinking". News of his vindication reaches Einstein, and crowds of press arrive at his door just as Elsa returns to him. A year later, Einstein visits Cambridge and meets Eddington.

== Cast ==
=== Germany ===
- Andy Serkis as Albert Einstein
- Lucy Cohu as Mileva Einstein
- Jodhi May as Elsa Einstein
- Donald Sumpter as Max Planck
- Callum Williams as Hans Einstein
- Jacob Théato as Eduard Einstein
- Anton Lesser as Fritz Haber
- John Bowe as Leopold Koppel
- Kika Markham as Aunt Fanny
- Philip Whitchurch as Uncle Rudolf

=== Britain ===
- David Tennant as Arthur Eddington
- Jim Broadbent as Sir Oliver Lodge
- Rebecca Hall as Winnifred Eddington, Arthur's Sister
- Richard McCabe as Frank Watson Dyson
- Lucy Briers as The Librarian
- Paul Brooke as H.H. Turner
- Oliver Hall as Boy Throwing Stones
- Patrick Kennedy as William Marston
- Christopher Campbell as Herr Muller
- Caroline Gruber as Frau Muller
- Eleanor Tomlinson as Agnes Muller
- Ben Uttley as First Tennis Player
- Richard Graham as Man With White Feather

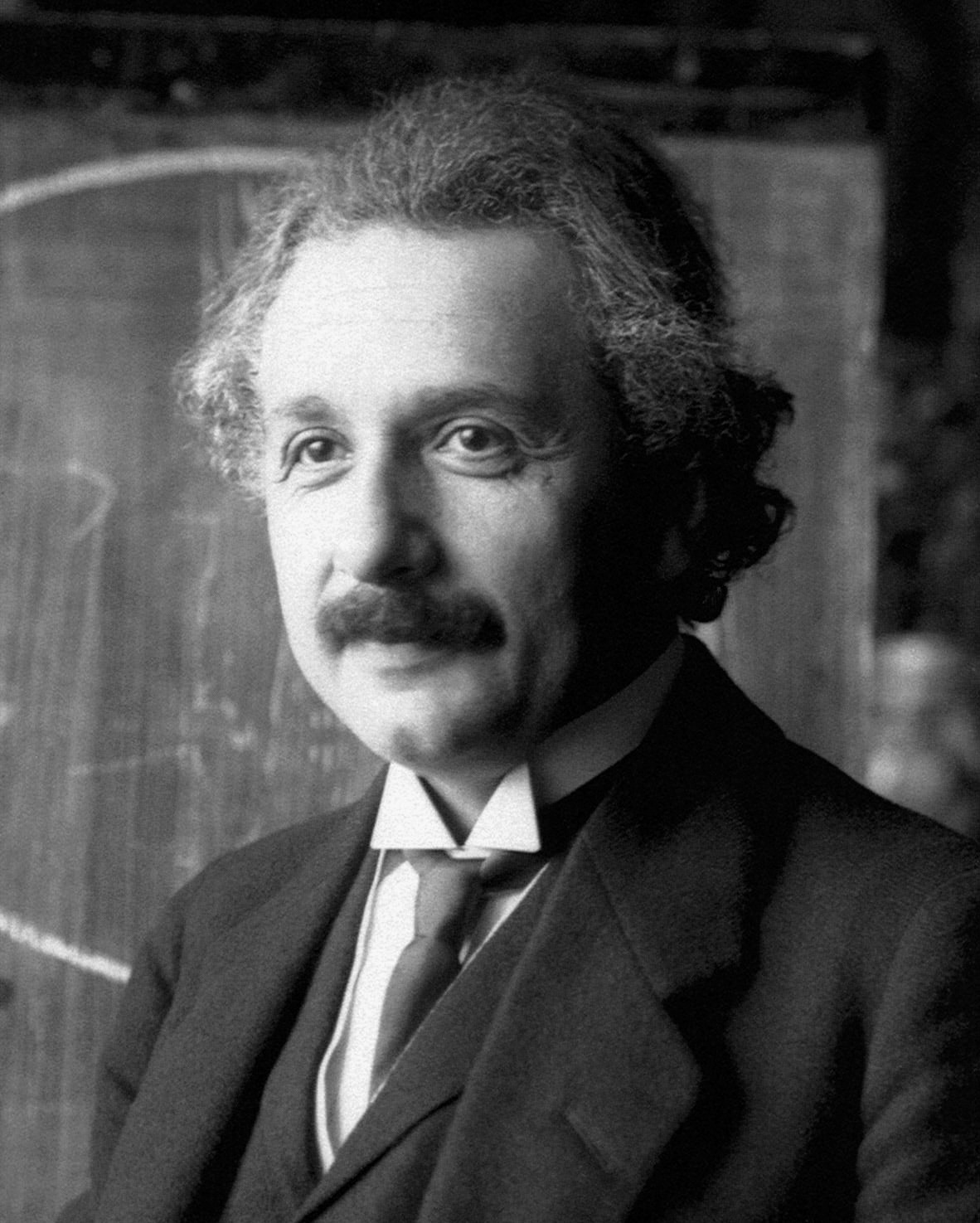
Albert Einstein (1879–1955)

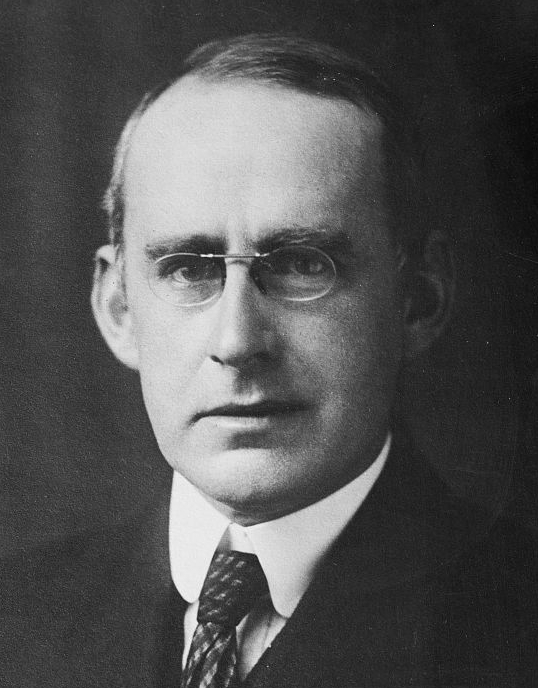
Arthur Stanley Eddington (1882–1944)

== Production ==
Einstein And Eddington is written by Peter Moffat and directed by Philip Martin, who both collaborated for the production of Hawking, a BBC biopic about the physicist. It is produced by Company Pictures and the BBC, with HBO and Pioneer Pictures, Hungary.

Location filming occurred at the Hungarian Academy of Sciences, St John's College, Cambridge, and on the Adriatic Coast of Croatia. Walter Isaacson acted as consultant (with Francisco Diego as eclipse advisor).
