= CSFC =

CSFC may refer to:

- Connacht Senior Football Championship, a Gaelic football competition in Ireland

In association football:

- Cheltenham Saracens F.C.
- Chemelil Sugar F.C.
- Civil Service F.C.
- Cobham Sports F.C.
- Continental Star F.C.
- Coventry Sphinx F.C.
- Cowes Sports F.C.
- Crane Sports F.C.
- Crumlin Star F.C.

In education:

- Cadbury Sixth Form College
- Colchester Sixth Form College
- Coulsdon Sixth Form College
