= Thirsk (surname) =

Thirsk is a surname. Notable people with the surname include:

- Amanda Thirsk (born 1965), British courtier
- Jason Thirsk (1967–1996), American musician
- Joan Thirsk (1922–2013), British historian
- Kristy Thirsk (fl. 1995–2015), Canadian singer-songwriter
- Robert Thirsk (born 1953), Canadian engineer and astronaut
- Simon Thirsk (born 1977), South African swimmer
