= Undercover (2016 TV series) =

- Written by: Peter Moffat
- Directed by: James Hawes
- Starring: Sophie Okonedo; Adrian Lester; Dennis Haysbert; Derek Riddell; Vincent Regan
- Theme music composer: Vince Pope
- Composer: Vince Pope
- Country of origin: United Kingdom
- Original language: English
- No. of series: 1
- No. of episodes: 6

Production
- Executive producers: Hilary Salmon; Peter Moffat
- Producer: Richard Stokes
- Cinematography: Chris Seager
- Running time: 60 minutes

Original release
- Network: BBC One; BBC One HD
- Release: 3 April – 15 May 2016

Related
- Undercover (South Korea)

Undercover is a six-part BBC television drama series co-produced with BBC America which was first broadcast beginning 3 April 2016. The series premiered in the United States as a six-hour miniseries on 16 and 17 November 2016 on BBC America; it began its run on the CBC in Canada in August (it has aired Mondays at 9pm/9:30 NT, premiering 22 August 2016) and on Canal + in France since January 2017.

For her performance in the series, Sophie Okonedo won the Royal Television Society Award for Actor: Female in 2017.

== Plot ==
Undercover follows the lives and family of Maya Cobbina, a British lawyer conducting a long-term legal fight to prove the innocence of US death row inmate Rudy Jones, and her husband Nick Johnson. After Cobbina is head-hunted for the position of Director of Public Prosecutions, her husband's past – and the circumstances under which the couple first met twenty years earlier – comes back to haunt him.

== Cast ==
Characters include:

- Maya Cobbina QC (Sophie Okonedo), a criminal law and human rights barrister, later Director of Public Prosecutions
- Nick Johnson (Adrian Lester), a former undercover Detective Sergeant with the Metropolitan Police
- Rudy Jones (Dennis Haysbert), an American prisoner on death row in Louisiana
- Paul Brightman (Derek Riddell), a security service officer and former undercover policeman
- Dominic Carter (Vincent Regan), Nick's handler during his days as an undercover officer
- Robert Greenlaw (Alistair Petrie), the Minister of State for Justice
- Clemency 'Clem' Johnson (Tamara Lawrance), Maya and Nick's 19-year-old daughter
- Dan Johnson (Daniel Ezra), Maya and Nick's 18-year-old son, who has a learning disability
- Ella Johnson (Shannon Hayes), Maya and Nick's youngest child
- Abigail Strickland (Leanne Best), a former undercover Metropolitan Police officer
- John Halliday (Mark Bonnar), the Crown Prosecution Service Chief Executive and Maya's deputy
- Michael Antwi (Sope Dirisu), an anti-racism campaigner
- Julia Redhead (Angel Coulby), a tabloid reporter for the Daily Metro and Maya's best friend
- Jimmy (Phil Davis), an employee in Maya's chambers
- Dr Francis (John Schwab)

== Production ==
The series was written by Peter Moffat, directed by James Hawes and produced by Richard Stokes. Moffat took inspiration for the fictional drama from real-life revelations about British police officers who had formed long-term relationships with activists they were investigating while undercover, as well as from the London Metropolitan Police Service's secret surveillance of the family of murdered teenager Stephen Lawrence.

== Episodes ==
No.	Title	Directed by	Written by	Original release date	UK viewers (millions)
1	"Episode One"	James Hawes	Peter Moffat	3 April 2016	7.22
British lawyer Maya Cobbina is anxiously awaiting the outcome of a last-minute appeal in a Louisiana prison with death row inmate Rudy Jones, whom she has defended for twenty years following his false imprisonment for murder. The appeal is lost, and he tells her to "Go big" in her campaigning against legal injustices. On her way to the airport she learns that the lethal injection has not killed Jones, who has instead been left critically ill. She arrives home in London to find that she is being encouraged to apply for the senior role of director of public prosecutions (DPP), despite having always acted as a defence lawyer. Initially reluctant, she is persuaded to put herself forward on learning that a fresh witness has come forward in relation to the death in 1996 of her friend Michael Antwi, an anti-racism campaigner, and by her recollection of Jones' last words to her. Her husband, Nick Johnson, a writer and househusband caring for their children, is approached by someone from his past who is ostensibly returning the family's missing dog, Rocco. He threatens to reveal a devastating secret about Nick if he does not cooperate with them.
2	"Episode Two"	James Hawes	Peter Moffat	10 April 2016	6.11
The prospect of Maya becoming DPP worries senior figures in the British establishment, who are concerned about what she might uncover in the Michael Antwi case. In a flashback to 1996, her husband Nick is revealed to have been an undercover police officer tasked with infiltrating an anti-racist organisation. Using his undercover identity, he befriends the younger Maya, seeing her as a useful tool in achieving the objectives of his secret assignment. He speaks out against police racism at public meetings to win her trust and they begin an intimate relationship. Both are present at an anti-racism march led by Antwi when it is attacked by racist thugs. During the upheaval, Antwi is arrested; Maya sees him inside the police station and he tells her he is fine. Later, he is brutally attacked by a violent racist who has been inappropriately placed in the same cell by the police.
3	"Episode Three"	James Hawes	Peter Moffat	17 April 2016	6.03
Maya is appointed DPP and is contacted by the new mystery witness in the Antwi case, whom the establishment are desperately trying to identify. Maya has to leave for the US to make a sudden intervention on behalf of death row prisoner Rudy Jones, but agrees to meet the witness on her return. In a flashback to 1996, a journalist who is a close friend of Maya's has her investigation into Antwi’s death undermined by the British establishment. In the present, Nick is approached by Abigail Strickland, an old colleague from his undercover days who became a drug addict as a result of her assignments infiltrating gangs dealing narcotics. She urges him to tell Maya the truth about his past. He realises that Strickland is the new Antwi witness, and later passes on her identity to the authorities in return for a verbal promise that they will leave him alone in future and that his undercover past will be kept hidden. Strickland is intercepted by establishment agents and injected with a fatal overdose moments before her meeting with Maya. Nick discovers that the deal he made with the authorities is not going to be honoured, and vows to tell Maya the truth about his past. At home, he tries to tell her but she has a seizure before he can properly begin.
4	"Episode Four"	James Hawes	Peter Moffat	24 April 2016	5.74
On recovering from her seizure, Maya immediately accuses Nick of having an affair. Caught off-guard, he instinctively and truthfully protests his innocence. When it later becomes clear to him that Maya's friend Julia saw him with Abigail Strickland, instead of telling Maya the truth about his past he lies, saying that he met an old friend from his days in a children's home but without naming her. Maya is diagnosed with epilepsy but refuses medication because it may affect her clarity of thinking. At work, she continues to try to trace the mystery witness who failed to meet her. Meanwhile, Julia has seen reports of Strickland's death in the news and realises that she is the woman she saw Nick with. Intrigued, she tries to investigate but can find no official records of her existence. Nick's handler, Dominic Carter, persuades him to confess to Maya that he had been having an affair, and Nick tells Carter that it was Julia who saw him with Strickland. Various members of the establishment then collude to have Julia appointed as her newspaper's royal correspondent, a position which will prevent her from investigating Strickland's death. Julia tells Maya the identity of the woman she saw Nick with and that she is dead; using subterfuge, Maya checks with Nick's supposed former children's home and finds that Strickland had never lived there. Meanwhile, Maya decides to contact former police officer Aiden Rose, hoping that having retired he will be more willing to provide information about Antwi's death. Unaware that Maya did not meet the mystery witness, or even know their identity, Rose is frank with her; as she leaves he tells her "Whatever they try and say now, I tell you one thing – Abigail Strickland was a good police officer". Nick contrives to have Maya overhear him on the phone apparently breaking off his affair. Knowing Strickland's police background and that she is dead, Maya sees through the deceit and instead investigates Nick's own past. Accompanied by her oldest daughter, she returns to Louisiana for Rudy Jones' latest appeal hearing. While there, she learns that the real Nick Johnson died at the age of 8.
5	"Episode Five"	Jim O'Hanlon	Peter Moffat	1 May 2016	5.33
In Louisiana, Maya is losing the fight to save Jones' life. Outside court, she meets Vernon Early, the witness whose evidence convicted Jones. He says that his false testimony was coerced and agrees to be a witness in the current hearings; he also tells her he met Michael Antwi. While accompanied by Dr Ambrose, an expert witness called by her mother, Clem tells Maya and Nick's son Dan this news. Dan unwittingly passes it on to Nick's handler Carter; Early is arrested on charges of perjury before he can testify. Meanwhile Julia's colleague Alex Brady has photographed Nick meeting a man whose car registration is untraceable. In Whitehall, the Minister is told "We have taken out an insurance policy on the whole family." Shortly afterwards Dan meets a young woman, Lola, apparently by chance; they agree to meet the next day. Maya returns home and confronts Nick with the information she has about his false identity; he confesses, but says he stopped spying on her early in their relationship. Mackie, Antwi's violent racist cellmate, tells Maya the CIA ordered him to kill Antwi but he failed because he was stopped by a "big-shot coon". Nick tells Carter that Maya has become more cautious, and that he needs more information if he is to ask her the right questions. He is told to "hold his nerve". Maya revisits Rose, who says he has six months to live. He confirms that Antwi was alive after Mackie's attack, and names Trimble as the officer who put them in the cell together. Maya duly visits Trimble, who shows CCTV footage of him being told by "the Scotsman" to "take the hit" for putting the racist in Antwi's cell. He adds that he has tried unsuccessfully to trace the Scotsman ever since. Julia gives Maya the photo of Nick's secret rendezvous; Maya recognises the man as 'the Scotsman'. At home, Maya's daughter sees the photo and recognises the Scotsman as the man who returned their dog Rocco. Maya asks Nick the man's identity, saying "You tell them everything and you tell me nothing […] What kind of monster are you?" In reply, he shows her his father's ashes and talks of his own personal sacrifices. Maya tells Nick he will never touch her again but that they will stay together for their children. She receives a call telling her that Early has died in police custody.
6	"Episode Six"	Jim O'Hanlon	Peter Moffat	15 May 2016	5.28
The establishment is relieved when Maya announces that no police officers will be prosecuted for the death of Michael Antwi, but Nick secretly vows to find out what lies behind the cover-up. In the US, Maya's appeal to the Supreme Court fails until Rudy Jones makes an unexpected intervention that saves his life despite his refusal to name the person who did kill the mayor-elect of Baton Rouge. Jones later tells Maya that the victim deserved to die. In London, Nick deliberately breaks his wrist just before meeting the Scotsman to demand information about the past. Later, he uses a plaster cast to conceal equipment on which he records an admission of the government’s secret involvement in past events. However, Nick destroys the device after being told of the conspirators' 'Plan B' but tells Maya that it malfunctioned. He arranges a meeting in the woods with Brady, telling Dan in the knowledge that Dan's 'girlfriend' will pass the information to the establishment. At the rendezvous Nick calls the police to say that a murder is about to occur, shortly before the Scotsman comes to assassinate him; Brady is hidden with a camera to record the scene. Before Nick is fired on, Maya and her children rush to the woods; Dan is shot just as the police arrive and they arrest the Scotsman. In hospital, the Scotsman reappears and tells Maya to stop her investigation, telling her to ask Nick why. Nick tells her that Antwi had committed the murder that Jones was convicted of; Dan's life is saved and Maya declares that she is going to 'go bigger'. Nick prepares to tell his family his true identity.

== Critical reception ==
The opening episode was watched by 5.2 million viewers (a 24.1% share). Writing in British daily newspaper The Guardian, Chitra Ramaswamy admitted: "I came to Peter Moffat's excellent drama knowing nothing and was instantly confused, though gripped nonetheless. Why was it called Undercover when it's about a lawyer on the brink of becoming the first black director of public prosecutions? […] Turns out it's called Undercover because of what awaits Maya at home. […] As well as being the ideal husband, Nick is an ex-undercover cop who has been deceiving his wife for 20 years." She added: "Thankfully Moffat's writing is so good and the direction so assured I didn't mind not having a clue what was going on, even if at times it felt like at least three different dramas were playing out in tandem." Ramaswamy judged Okonedo "a brilliant and criminally underused actor in Britain; warm, honest, fierce yet vulnerable. It's wonderful to see her getting a role she deserves. It's also a testament to Lester that his Nick is so likable, a compassionate family man mired in a hell of his own making."

== Adaptations ==
A South Korean adaptation titled Undercover (produced by JTBC Studios and Story TV) started airing on JTBC since April 23, 2021.
