= A Very Royal Scandal =

2024 British television miniseries

- Promotional poster
- Genre: Historical drama
- Based on: Airhead: The Imperfect Art of Making News by Emily Maitlis
- Written by: Jeremy Brock
- Directed by: Julian Jarrold
- Starring: Michael Sheen; Ruth Wilson
- Country of origin: United Kingdom
- Original language: English
- No. of series: 1
- No. of episodes: 3

Production
- Executive producers: Emily Maitlis; Graham Broadbent; Karen Thrussell; Pete Czernin; Diarmuid McKeown; Jeremy Brock; Julian Jarrold
- Producer: Josh Hyams
- Running time: 59–61 minutes
- Production companies: Blueprint Television; Sony Pictures Television; Amazon MGM Studios

Original release
- Network: Amazon Prime Video
- Release: 19 September 2024

Related
- A Very English Scandal; A Very British Scandal

A Very Royal Scandal is a British three-part historical drama series from Amazon MGM Studios with Emily Maitlis as executive producer and starring Ruth Wilson as Maitlis and Michael Sheen as the then-Duke of York (later known as Andrew Mountbatten-Windsor). It is written by Jeremy Brock and directed by Julian Jarrold.

A Very Royal Scandal was released on 19 September 2024 on the streaming service Amazon Prime Video.

== Premise ==
The series is a dramatic retelling of Emily Maitlis' professional and personal journey leading up to the 2019 BBC television interview of Prince Andrew, Duke of York by Maitlis for BBC Two news and current affairs programme Newsnight regarding the Prince's ties to human trafficker Jeffrey Epstein.

== Plot ==
=== Episode 1 ===
In 2008, Jeffrey Epstein accepts a plea to state criminal charges in Florida in exchange for federal immunity. Later, in December 2010, Andrew's photo is taken in New York Central Park as he meets Epstein. The two had been meeting because Andrew was seeking financial advice from Epstein.

In spite of the Florida plea bargain with federal authorities, Epstein is re-arrested by SDNY federal authorities on revived federal charges in 2019. After Epstein's death in August 2019, Andrew agrees to a BBC interview "Prince Andrew & the Epstein Scandal" in November 2019.

The March 2001 photo of the 17-year-old (at the time) Virginia Giuffre and 41-year-old (at the time) Prince Andrew at a house on Kinnerton Street has been published in the lead-up to the interview.

In May 2015, Virginia Giuffre contacts the London Metropolitan Police with allegations against Andrew. The Met dismissed the case in 2016 because the activities were largely outside the United Kingdom. Maitlis considers this a "coverup".

In a practice session with her colleagues before the interview, a colleague playing the devil's advocate as Andrew retorts that even if he had sex with Virginia Giuffre in 2001 when she was 17, the age of consent in the United Kingdom was 16.

=== Episode 2 ===
A few days before Andrew's Newsnight interview, BBC Panorama interviewed Virginia Giuffre. Andrew denies having danced with Giuffre at the nightclub Tramp in 2001.

Andrew admits to having invited Ghislaine Maxwell to Windsor Castle and Sandringham House in 2000. Andrew claims that Epstein was Maxwell's 'plus one'.

Andrew says that he was a patron of NSPCC and did not see any child sexual abuse. He owns up to his long friendship with Maxwell. He was hosted at Maxwell's home at the affluent Belgravia neighbourhood of London.

=== Episode 3 ===
After the state of New York passes the Child Victims Act of 2019, Virginia Giuffre files a civil suit against Andrew claiming that she feared death after her 2001 sexual encounter with the Prince.

Emily Maitlis leaves the BBC at the end of 2021.

The civil case against the Prince is decided to be settled before the Platinum Jubilee of Elizabeth II; he is excluded from the Jubilee.

== Cast ==
- Ruth Wilson as Emily Maitlis
- Michael Sheen as Prince Andrew, Duke of York
- Alex Jennings as Sir Edward Young
- Joanna Scanlan as Amanda Thirsk
- Éanna Hardwicke as Stewart Maclean
- Lydia Leonard as Esme Wren
- Honor Swinton Byrne as Princess Beatrice of York
- Sofia Oxenham as Princess Eugenie of York
- Claire Rushbrook as Sarah, Duchess of York
- Clare Calbraith as Sam McAlister
- Robert Neumark Jones as Jason Stein
- John Hopkins as Jeffrey Epstein
- Nicholas Burns as Mark Gwynne
- Tom Arnold as Head Newsnight Cameraman

== Production ==
The series is produced for Amazon MGM Studios by Blueprint Pictures. Jeremy Brock is the screenwriter and Julian Jarrold the director. Emily Maitlis is executive producer on the series alongside Karen Thrussell, Graham Broadbent, Pete Czernin, Diarmuid McKeown, Brock and Jarrold.

The series is a spiritual successor to A Very English Scandal (2018), about the Thorpe affair, and A Very British Scandal (2021), about the Argyll divorce, both of which were also produced by Blueprint.

=== Casting ===
In November 2023, Ruth Wilson and Michael Sheen were set in the roles as Emily Maitlis and Andrew with Alex Jennings, Joanna Scanlan and Éanna Hardwicke also in the cast. The cast also includes Clare Calbraith as Sam McAlister and Lydia Leonard as Esme Wren from Newsnight, Honor Swinton Byrne and Sofia Oxenham as Princesses Beatrice and Eugenie, and Claire Rushbrook as Sarah Ferguson.

=== Filming ===
Amazon Studios started production on the series in the UK in November 2023.

== Reception ==
On the review aggregator website Rotten Tomatoes, 85% of 18 critics' reviews are positive, with an average rating of 6.3/10. Metacritic, which uses a weighted average, assigned a score of 66 out of 100 based on 17 critics, indicating "generally favorable" reviews.

Award	Date of ceremony	Category	Recipient	Result	Ref.
TV Choice Awards	10 February 2025	Best New Drama	A Very Royal Scandal	Nominated	
TV Choice Awards	10 February 2025	Best Drama Performance	Michael Sheen	Nominated	
National Television Awards	10 September 2025	Best New Drama	A Very Royal Scandal	Nominated	
National Television Awards	10 September 2025	Best Drama Performance	Ruth Wilson	Nominated	
National Television Awards	10 September 2025	Best Drama Performance	Michael Sheen	Nominated	

== See also ==
- Scoop – 2024 film produced for Netflix about the same interview, based on a book by former Newsnight editor Sam McAlister.
