= Lewis Goodall =

British journalist

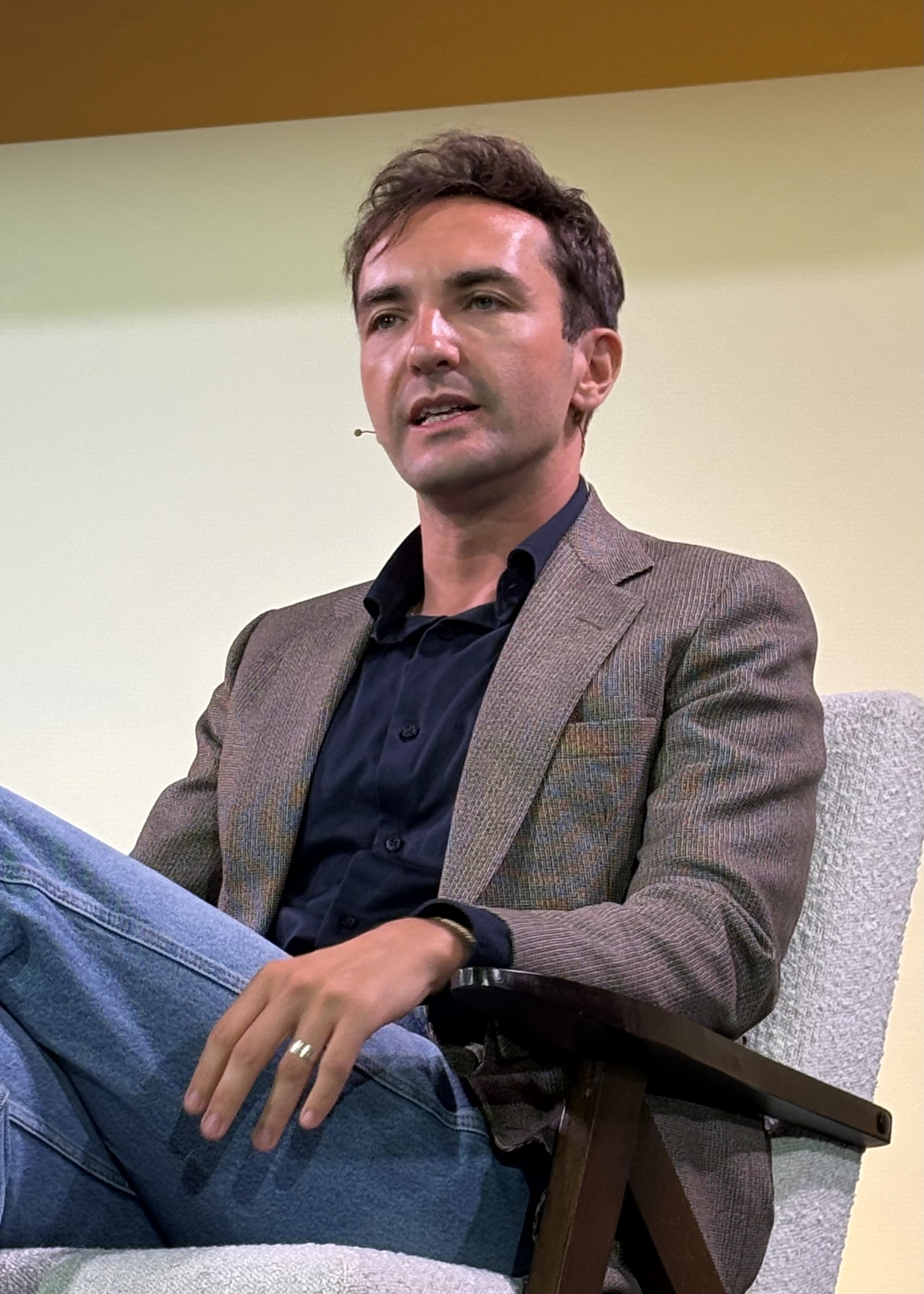
- Born: 1 July 1989 (age 37); Birmingham, England
- Education: St John's College, Oxford
- Occupations: Journalist, television reporter, author
- Employer(s): BBC; Sky News; LBC
- Spouse: Tone Langengen (m. 2023)

Lewis Alan Goodall (born 1 July 1989) is a British journalist, broadcaster and author. He worked as a researcher for Granada Studios before becoming a political correspondent for Sky News. He later became policy editor of the BBC's flagship current affairs programme, Newsnight.

In 2022, frustrated with their editorial policy, he quit the BBC alongside colleagues Emily Maitlis (Newsnight) and Jon Sopel (Politics Show) to launch The News Agents podcast. His first book, Left for Dead?: The Strange Death and Rebirth of the Labour Party, was published in September 2018.

== Early life ==
Goodall was born on 1 July 1989. His mother was 17 years old when he was born. His father was a welder at the nearby Rover Company factory. He was raised on a council estate in Longbridge; he attended Turves Green Boys' School and completed his A-levels at Cadbury Sixth Form College. Goodall was a member of the Labour Party while at school.

He studied at St John's College, Oxford, graduating in 2010 with a degree in history and politics. He was the first in his family to go to university. While at Oxford, he spent time in the United States as an intern to the Democrat House Representative Diana DeGette. He later became an Entente Cordiale scholar, spending time learning French in Paris and Mandarin Chinese at Beijing Normal University.

== Career ==
=== Granada and BBC Newsnight ===
After graduation, Goodall worked for Granada Studios as a question writer for the quiz show University Challenge. He then worked for the centre-left think tank the Institute for Public Policy Research (IPPR). At the IPPR, he was the main researcher for the "Northern Economic Futures Commission" think tank. He began his career in journalism as a producer and reporter at the BBC in 2012, where he was a producer on Daily Politics. He later became Economics and Business Analyst for BBC News.

In 2014, he joined Newsnight as a political researcher, briefing presenters for major interviews, before becoming an occasional reporter for the programme as well as wider BBC output, including Victoria Derbyshire and BBC Radio Four. In 2015, Goodall reported from both the Charlie Hebdo shooting and November 2015 Paris attacks. Also in 2015, Goodall profiled the famous theatre and clown professor Philippe Gaulier and his school, the École Philippe Gaulier, in France. Goodall conducted the last interview with Labour Party politician Denis Healey before the latter’s death in October 2015.

=== Sky News ===
Goodall left the BBC in 2016 to join Sky News as a political correspondent. He became known for his coverage of the Brexit crisis and the strife within the Labour Party, and in 2019 was named a MHP Communications "30 under 30" young journalists to watch. That year, he presented a documentary on the rise of Nigel Farage and the Brexit Party. He became known for his election and data analysis, and became a main presenter on Sky's election programmes in 2017 and 2019. His first book, an analysis of New Labour and Jeremy Corbyn titled Left for Dead?: The Strange Death and Rebirth of the Labour Party, was published in 2018.

=== Return to BBC Newsnight ===
He returned to the BBC in January 2020 as Newsnight's policy editor. He went on to become one of the most prominent faces of the BBC's reporting on the COVID-19 pandemic, especially its impact on schools, care homes and the death rate. In August 2020, he reported extensively on the A-level grading scandal, credited with changing government policy over which grades would be given to students in that year's exams, for which he was nominated for an Orwell Prize in 2021. In 2022, he reported from the western Ukrainian border on the outbreak of the Russo-Ukrainian War and the resultant refugee crisis in eastern Poland. That year, he presented a Radio Four documentary, "What is a Tory?", on the evolution of Conservative political thought. Goodall featured in the BBC's election night coverage and was called a "rising star" of the corporation.

Goodall later stated that the BBC had not protected his editorial freedom from criticism by former Conservative Party communications chief Robbie Gibb, who was appointed to the BBC board in May 2021 and should not have had direct editorial involvement. Editors had instead warned him to "be careful: Robbie is watching you". This in part led to his decision later to leave the BBC.

=== Post-BBC ===
In June 2022, Goodall announced he was leaving the BBC to join media company Global Media & Entertainment to make a daily podcast (The News Agents with Emily Maitlis and Jon Sopel). He stated on Twitter that he would be remaining at Newsnight for "a while yet". The News Agents was launched on 30 August 2022.

In July 2025, Goodall said he had been subject to a "constitutionally unprecedented" super-injunction by the UK government for 23 months, to prevent the reporting of a "catastrophic" data leak pertaining to Afghan asylum seekers. Goodall called the case "deeply disturbing for press freedom" in the UK.

Goodall writes for the New Statesman.

== Personal life ==
Goodall married Tone Langengen in August 2023. She is the Tony Blair Institute for Global Change's senior climate and energy policy adviser.
