= Ian Katz =

South-African born British journalist (born 1968)

- Born: 9 February 1968 (age 58); South Africa
- Education: University College School
- Alma mater: New College, Oxford
- Occupation: Journalist
- Employer: Channel 4
- Notable credit: Newsnight (BBC)

Ian Alexander Katz (born 9 February 1968) is a British journalist and broadcasting executive who is currently Chief Content Officer at Channel 4, overseeing all editorial decision making and commissioning across Channel 4's linear channels, streaming services and social media.

Katz originally followed a career in print journalism, and was a deputy editor of The Guardian until 2013. He then became the editor of the Newsnight current affairs programme on BBC Two, a role which he left in late 2017 to join Channel 4.

== Early life ==
Born into a Jewish family he spent the first ten years of his life in South Africa. At that point, Katz and his family moved to London.

Katz was educated at University College School, an independent school for boys in Hampstead in northwest London, followed by New College, Oxford, where he studied Philosophy, Politics and Economics.

== Early career in journalism ==
Katz joined the short-lived Sunday Correspondent as a graduate trainee in 1989 along with Jonathan Freedland, a future colleague. During the following year Katz moved to The Guardian remaining there until his BBC appointment in 2013, apart taking up a Laurence Stern fellowship at The Washington Post in 1993. During his period at The Guardian, he was successively a reporter, foreign correspondent (in New York 1994–97), edited the G2 supplement for eight years and was responsible for the Saturday (2006–08) and the weekday editions of the newspaper,

Katz was responsible for the new guardian.co.uk website in 1998. As features editor in January 2003, he ran an image commissioned from artist Gillian Wearing for the G2 front cover which consisted of the words: "Fuck Cilla Black". Intended to promote an article about the decline in the quality of British television, readers complained about the decline in the quality of newspaper journalism. Black's agent, her son Robert Willis, described it as a "cheap publicity stunt", and Wearing apologised for the offence caused.

In 2004, while editor of the G2 supplement, and having bought a list of voters, Katz oversaw the campaign for Guardian readers to pair with undecided voters in the marginal Clark County, Ohio to help swing the 2004 US presidential election against George W. Bush and in favour of John Kerry. The campaign did not have a successful outcome; it was dropped after a negative response and Bush won Clark County. In 2008, he became deputy editor, at the same time as Paul Johnson and Katharine Viner.

== Guardian deputy editor ==
As deputy editor, latterly overseeing News and Business coverage from Spring 2010, Katz supervised The Guardian's investigation by Nick Davies, and others, into the News International phone hacking scandal. Following the release in 2011 of the Palestine Papers by broadcaster Al Jazeera and The Guardian, Katz defended 'the newspaper against attacks from Ron Prosor, at the time the Israeli ambassador to the UK, who had seen it as demonstrating the newspaper's "affinity for Hamas". This assertion Katz wrote was "based on a highly tendentious reading of a single op-ed column [by Seumas Milne] and a single line of one of two editorials which the paper ran on the Palestine Papers".

Katz was also one of the newspaper's contacts with Julian Assange of WikiLeaks, whose material The Guardian initially published before the relationship between the two organisations turned sour. According to an article in The Australian, David Aaronovitch of The Times at a panel discussion at the Frontline Club accused Katz of "dirty dealing", while Katz defended himself against an accusation of a "betrayal" of Assange levelled by Aaronovitch in the decision by The Guardian to publish documents relating to the Swedish sexual allegations involving Assange.

Katz was on the final short list of two in 2015 to succeed Alan Rusbridger as editor-in-chief of The Guardian, but Katz's rival, Katharine Viner, was appointed instead. In the film The Fifth Estate (2013), Katz was portrayed by actor Dan Stevens.

== Newsnight editor ==
Katz joined the BBC in July 2013, and became editor of Newsnight at the beginning of September. Katz was the permanent successor to Peter Rippon, as editor of the programme following serious errors in editorial practice in recent years.

Shortly after becoming editor, Katz sent an unintended tweet late on 9 September. Katz typed, in what he thought was a private direct message, that the Labour MP Rachel Reeves was "boring snoring" while being interviewed by Jeremy Paxman on the programme. Katz deleted his tweet and apologised to both Reeves and the Labour Party.

A year later, Katz returned to the issue of the political interview in an article for the Financial Times. His mistake, he thought, had been to refer to Reeves when all political interviews had the "boring snoring" quality he had attributed to her appearance on Newsnight. He argued for a better understanding between the two sides in the "transaction", so that an interview is "a source of light as well as heat" becoming an opportunity to "explore and illuminate the dilemmas politicians face, to recognise that government is not a choice between good and bad policies but most often a search for the least worst option."

On 31 October 2017, it was announced that Katz was leaving the BBC, and his role as Newsnight editor, for Channel 4 where he became director of programmes in January 2018.

== Channel 4 ==
Katz was appointed as Channel 4's Director of Programmes in October 2017 by new Chief Executive Alex Mahon, effectively replacing outgoing Chief Creative Officer, Jay Hunt who had stepped down earlier in the year. His appointment was greeted with surprise within the television industry.

In his first major speech to the TV industry in May 2018, Katz affirmed his commitment to Channel 4's public service mission, saying the broadcaster's remit was "more important and relevant than ever". He pledged to "dial up the difference" not he channel, announcing new commissions including Brexit: The Uncivil War, The Big Narstie Show and This Way Up.

Katz commissioned Russell T Davies' drama about the AIDS pandemic, It's A Sin, described as a "poignant masterpiece" - with the drama breaking streaming records and driving a surge in people getting tested for HIV. Other shows commissioned under Katz include Jade: The Reality Star Who Changed Britain, The Dog House, Joe Lycett's Got Your Back, Help, Grayson's Art Club, We Are Lady Parts, The Circle and The Curse. Under Katz, Channel 4 also commissioned Black To Front, a day of programming which took place in September 2021 and featured only black talent in front of and behind the camera. The initiative was hailed as a "successful kick in the derriere for British television".

Katz at Channel 4 has secured a number of surprise deals to bring major sporting events to a 'free-to-air' audience. In July 2019, Channel 4 reached agreement with rights holders Sky to air live coverage of England's Cricket World Cup final against New Zealand with 4.5 million viewers watching England's victory.

Katz was promoted to Chief Content Officer in January 2020 and given editorial responsibility across Channel 4's linear channels, streaming service, and social media. Channel 4's annual results for 2020 reported growth in streaming on its All 4 service of 26% and a rise in digital revenues of 11% over the same year.

In November 2019, Channel 4 was accused of breaching impartiality rules by empty-chairing the UK Prime Minister Boris Johnson with a melting block of ice for its leadership debate on the climate change crisis - though it was subsequently cleared by regulator Ofcom of breaching any of its code on impartiality. Other controversies include a backlash over Gogglebox star, Scarlett Moffatt's family home being recreated in rural Namibia for factual entertainment show, The British Tribe Next Door.

Katz launched a review of historic content on the Channel 4 streaming service All 4, after which he announced that in general Channel 4 would seek not to remove or amend content from its archive but would instead include warnings on potentially offensive content. Katz has overseen the creation of Channel 4's cross-UK commissioning team, with network commissioners established in Leeds, Glasgow and Bristol.

Katz responded strongly to the possibility of Channel 4 being privatised. Speaking at the Edinburgh International Television Festival he said that he believed "what is special about the channel would be destroyed".

== Personal life ==
Katz married Justine Roberts not long before Roberts founded Mumsnet. They had four children and separated in 2019.

Media offices
Preceded by Peter Rippon	Editor: Newsnight; 2012–2017	Succeeded by Esme Wren
