= Birdsong (serial) =

British TV series

- Based on: Birdsong by Sebastian Faulks
- Written by: Abi Morgan
- Directed by: Philip Martin
- Starring: Clémence Poésy; Eddie Redmayne
- Composer: Nicholas Hooper
- Country of origin: United Kingdom
- Original language: English
- No. of series: 1
- No. of episodes: 2

Production
- Producer: Lynn Horsford
- Running time: Episode 1 – 84 minutes Episode 2 – 82 minutes
- Production company: Working Title Television

Original release
- Network: BBC One
- Release: 22 January – 29 January 2012

Birdsong is a two-part British 2012 television drama, based on the 1993 war novel Birdsong by Sebastian Faulks. It stars Eddie Redmayne as Stephen Wraysford and Clémence Poésy as Isabelle Azaire and was directed by Philip Martin based on a screenplay by Abi Morgan.

The adaptation was produced by Working Title Films for the BBC and PBS's Masterpiece. It premiered in January 2012 in the United Kingdom and in April 2012 in the United States.

== Plot ==
The television adaptation differs from the novel in many respects, completely omitting the section set in the 1970s.

The story is told in flashbacks, with Stephen Wraysford's experiences in World War I alternating with his memories of his affair with Isabelle Azaire, a young married woman whom he met before the war when he was staying in her husband's house to learn about business. Stephen and Isabelle run away together when their affair is discovered by her husband, but she leaves Stephen after a short time. Stephen recalls these events when he is badly wounded as a result of an encounter with German sappers when he and his own men accompany the British tunnellers of the Royal Engineers underground. Left for dead, he is discovered and saved by Jack Firebrace, a working-class man with whom Stephen has previously felt little empathy.

In 1916, Stephen is reunited with Isabelle as a result of a chance meeting with her sister Jeanne, shortly before his battalion goes "over the top" in the Battle of the Somme. Upset by the encounter, he takes his fellow-officer Weir to a prostitute, but neither man is able to obtain satisfaction. Weir plays a much smaller role than he does in the novel. During the battle, Stephen is again wounded and loses many of his men; Firebrace and Weir are among the survivors.

Two years later, with the war drawing to a close, Stephen's men are preparing another mining expedition. He meets Jeanne, who tells him that Isabelle has died, but he also discovers that he has a seven-year-old daughter, Françoise, whose existence Isabelle had concealed from him. He is also disheartened by the death of his friend Weir, shot dead by a sniper. German miners, digging close by, lay a charge and Weir's men are unable to get out of the tunnel in time. Stephen and Firebrace are the only ones left alive, but their way out is blocked. They talk and share their experiences, Firebrace grieving for his dead son while Stephen confides in him that he has a daughter (in the novel, Stephen is unaware of the child's existence at this stage). Stephen finds some explosives and Firebrace, himself close to death, tells him how to lay them in order to blast their way out of the tunnel. Before Stephen completes the task, Firebrace dies. The explosion successfully clears a way out for Stephen, and he stumbles out of the mine to be confronted by two German soldiers, who tell him that the war is over.

Unlike in the novel, Stephen meets Françoise before the war is over and Jeanne implores him to be a part of her life; after the war he is seen showing up at Jeanne's house to be with her and his daughter.

Whereas in the novel Stephen is terrified of birds, the television adaptation does not explore this, although birdsong is frequently heard.

== Cast ==
- Eddie Redmayne as Stephen Wraysford
- Clémence Poésy as Isabelle Azaire
- Laurent Lafitte as René Azaire
- Clara Grebot as Lisette Azaire
- Maxime Roussel as Gregoire Azaire
- Joseph Mawle as Jack Firebrace
- Matthew Goode as Captain Gray
- Richard Madden as Weir
- Anthony Andrews as Colonel Barclay
- Marie-Josée Croze as Jeanne Fourmentier
- Thomas Turgoose as Tipper
- George MacKay as Private Douglas
- Rory Keenan as Brennan
- Daniel Cerqueira as Shaw
- Sean McKenzie as Turner
- Matthew Aubrey as Byrne
- Abraham Belaga as Lebrun
- Océane Bersegeay-Holliday as Françoise

== Episodes ==
No.	Title	Directed by	Written by	Original release date	U.K. viewers (millions)
1	"Episode 1"	Philip Martin	Abi Morgan	22 January 2012	7.01
France, 1910, and Englishman Stephen Wraysford arrives to work at the textile factory of the Azaire family, only to fall desperately in love with his host's wife Isabelle. Before long, the pair begin an illicit and all-consuming affair, with huge consequences for them both.
2	"Episode 2"	Philip Martin	Abi Morgan	29 January 2012	6.16
As Stephen recovers from his injuries, he continues to be haunted by memories of his affair with Isabelle – and while he and his men prepare for a major offensive at the Somme, he unexpectedly meets his former lover again. However, she is unable to explain why she left him, throwing him into a state of turmoil before the battle.

== Production history ==
Working Title held the screen rights to the novel for many years, but were quoted as saying "there is something afoot" after Faulks' 2007 commission to write a new James Bond novel.

Shooting of war scenes took place near Gyúró, Hungary. Remains of the set can be seen on Google Maps.
