= The News Agents =

British news and current affairs podcast

- Genre: daily news podcast, podcast show, news commentary podcast, political podcast
- Language: English

Cast and voices
- Hosted by: Emily Maitlis; Jon Sopel; Lewis Goodall

Publication
- No. of episodes: 684
- Original release: 30 August 2022 – present

Reception
- Ratings: 4.4/5

Related
- Website: www.thenewsagents.co.uk

The News Agents is a British daily podcast produced by Global Media & Entertainment. It is presented by Emily Maitlis, Jon Sopel, and Lewis Goodall. It launched on 30 August 2022, with episodes released every weekday afternoon.

== History ==
Emily Maitlis and Jon Sopel, who had both previously worked for BBC News, announced in February 2022 that they would be leaving to join Global Media & Entertainment. Prior to her departure, Maitlis was the main presenter for the BBC current affairs programme Newsnight, while Sopel had been BBC North American Editor. They had previously worked together on the BBC podcast Americast. On 22 August 2022, Global announced that The News Agents would launch the following week. Hosted by Emily Maitlis, Jon Sopel, and Lewis Goodall, The News Agents presented itself as an alternative to mainstream media outlets, such as the BBC. The initial schedule was for Maitlis and Sopel to present daily shows on Mondays to Thursdays, with Goodall presenting on Fridays.

The podcast received extensive pre-launch publicity, which James Marriott, writing in The Times, described as a "weeks-long publicity blitz". It promised a "suave up-to-date show" that would stand out from the "staid, fuddy-duddy stuff on Olde-Worlde radio". In her 2022 MacTaggart Lecture at the Edinburgh Television Festival, Maitlis spoke of what she believed to be a threat posed to journalism by populist politicians, and suggested that The News Agents might counter this.

=== Sponsorship ===
On 27 June 2023, Global announced that HSBC would become lead sponsor of The News Agents. On 11 January 2024, HSBC and Global announced an extension of the sponsorship deal for a further 12 months.

== Notable episodes ==
The opening episode, titled Trump – Prison or President?, covered the FBI investigation into Donald Trump's handling of presidential documents and the subsequent raid on his Mar-a-Lago estate, with Anthony Scaramucci, the Trump critic and former White House Director of Communications, appearing as a guest.

In January 2023, the podcast obtained a leaked letter from Culture Secretary Michelle Donelan to the Prime Minister Rishi Sunak, in which she recommended the government reverse its plans to privatise Channel 4. In an episode released on 27 January 2023, which contained an interview with Nicola Sturgeon, the First Minister of Scotland, she accused some opponents of the Scottish Government's Gender Recognition Reform (Scotland) Bill of using women's rights as a "cloak of acceptability" for transphobia.

On 17 September 2024, it was announced that the podcast's presenters would host a live event at the Royal Albert Hall titled The News Agents Live On Stage on 1 December.

In July 2025, Goodall revealed on the podcast that he had been one of the journalists investigating the Ministry of Defence's 2022 data breach which exposed the identities of thousands of Afghans when he, through the podcast's owner Global Media, was served a High Court superinjunction which prevented him from discussing the breach for almost two years. Goodall called the proceedings, in which he and other journalists were threatened that they could face prison for revealing information protected by the superinjunction, "deeply disturbing" with the potential to set a "profoundly dangerous" precedent for freedom of the press.

== Spin-off podcasts ==
On 26 May 2023, it was announced that a weekly US version of the podcast would launch on 20th June. The News Agents USA is hosted by Maitlis and Sopel. On 29 September 2023, Global announced that a further spin-off podcast, The News Agents Investigates, would launch on 1 October with Goodall as the presenter. On 7 February 2024, Global announced plans to launch The Sports Agents, presented by Gabby Logan and Mark Chapman, which would be available on Tuesdays and Thursdays from the spring. The Sports Agents launched on 5 March 2024. On 26 April 2024, it was announced that Tesco had signed a deal to become headline sponsor of The Sports Agents.

== Audience ==
On 4 September 2022, The News Agents topped the Apple UK Podcast Chart. On 8 December, the Press Gazette reported that The News Agents had reached 10 million downloads. On 31 July 2024, the podcast reached 100 million downloads.

== Reception of first edition ==
The first edition received a mixed reception, with reviewers praising the quality of its content but expressing concern about the informal approach of its presenters. James Marriott of The Times described it as "slick but a little baffling" with "tantalising glimpses of the much better show" that would emerge from the "beautiful, uber-professional moving parts that are welded together so oddly in this first episode". Sean O'Grady of The Independent felt it was "balanced, informative and analytical" but was less impressed with the presenting style: "The thing I actively disliked about the podcast was the very thing that is supposed to make these exercises so refreshing and fun – that terrible forced chumminess and informality, supposed to be like three old friends gossiping in a bar".

Mark Lawson of The Guardian suggested the edition "most resembled the post-show Newsnight green room cool-down, with presenters and contributors speaking slightly more loosely", and that it was "bold of Global" to launch the podcast, but concluded "It remains to be seen, though, if the best use is being made of these latest big-money signings". Judith Woods of The Telegraph was critical of the episode for choosing to focus on an international story rather than focusing on UK news topics "on a day when the [British Medical Association] warned of a doctors' strike, a police investigation was reopened on an alleged child grooming gang in Hull and Goldman Sachs suggested inflation could top 22 per cent next year". The topic choice was also highlighted by Fiona Sturges of The Financial Times, particularly as the Mar-a-Lago raid was by then an old news story. She highlighted other problems as well: "a surfeit of interviews with commentators you've never heard of; phoney-sounding listener questions; and, Lord help us, the small talk" which "comes over as forced and unfunny".

Fiona Sturges suggested that its real rival is The Rest Is Politics, a political podcast presented by Alastair Campbell and Rory Stewart.
