= Prince Andrew & the Epstein Scandal =

2019 Newsnight television interview episode

- Newsnight episode
- Presented by: Emily Maitlis
- Original air date: 16 November 2019

"Prince Andrew & the Epstein Scandal" is an episode of the BBC's news and current affairs programme Newsnight broadcast on BBC Two on 16 November 2019. In the 58-minute programme, then-Prince Andrew, Duke of York (now known as Andrew Mountbatten-Windsor) was interviewed by Emily Maitlis about his relationship with Jeffrey Epstein, the American financier and child sex offender. Andrew's responses in the interview were panned by both the media and the public.

In May 2020, it was announced that Andrew would indefinitely withdraw from his public roles. In October 2025, amid continued controversy surrounding his association with Epstein, Andrew was stripped of his honours, styles, and royal titles, including his peerage title of "Duke of York" and his birth title of prince. In February 2026, he was arrested on suspicions of misconduct in public office in connection with his ties to Epstein.

== Background ==
In March 2011, BBC News reported that the friendship of Andrew with American financier and convicted sex offender Jeffrey Epstein was producing "a steady stream of criticism", with calls for him to step down from his role as trade envoy. Andrew was also criticised in the media after his ex-wife Sarah Ferguson disclosed that he helped arrange for Epstein to pay off £15,000 of her debts. After Epstein was released from prison, Andrew had been photographed in December 2010 strolling with him in Central Park during a visit to New York City. In July 2011, Andrew's role as trade envoy was terminated and he reportedly cut all ties with Epstein.

On 30 December 2014, a Florida court filing by lawyers Bradley J. Edwards and Paul G. Cassell alleged that Andrew was one of several prominent figures to have participated in sexual activities with a minor later identified as Virginia Giuffre, who was allegedly trafficked for sex by Epstein. Giuffre (then known by her maiden name Virginia Roberts) asserted that she was raped by Andrew on three occasions, including a trip to London in 2001 when she was 17, and later in New York and on Little Saint James, U.S. Virgin Islands. She alleged Epstein paid her $15,000 to have sex with Andrew in London. Flight logs show Andrew and Giuffre were in the places she alleges the sex happened.

Andrew and Giuffre were also photographed together with his arm round her waist, and an Epstein associate, Ghislaine Maxwell, standing in the background, Andrew's supporters have repeatedly claimed the photo is fake and edited. Giuffre stated that she was pressured to have sex with Andrew and "wouldn't have dared object" as Epstein, through contacts, could have her "killed or abducted". A civil case filed by Giuffre against Prince Andrew was later settled for an undisclosed sum in February 2022.

In August 2019, court documents associated with a defamation case between Giuffre and Maxwell revealed that a second girl, Johanna Sjoberg, gave evidence alleging that Andrew had placed his hand on her breast while in Epstein's mansion posing for a photo with his Spitting Image puppet. By the end of August 2019, The New Republic published an email exchange between John Brockman and Evgeny Morozov from September 2013 in which Brockman mentions seeing a British man nicknamed "Andy" receiving a foot massage from two Russian women at Epstein's New York residence in September 2010. He added that he realised "that the recipient of Irina's foot massage was His Royal Highness, Prince Andrew, the Duke of York".

== Content ==
In November 2019, the BBC's Newsnight arranged an interview between Andrew and Emily Maitlis in which he publicly recounted his dealings with Epstein for the first time. The interview was recorded in Buckingham Palace on 14 November and broadcast on 16 November.

Andrew said that he met Epstein in 1999 through Ghislaine Maxwell. This version contradicts the account given by Andrew's private secretary in 2011, who said the two met in "the early 1990s". Maxwell also contradicts this version of events, saying that "That is a flat untruth." in a 2025 interview with Todd Blanche. Maxwell also claims that Sarah Ferguson was the one that introduced him to Epstein. Andrew said he did not regret his friendship with Epstein, saying, "The people that I met and the opportunities that I was given to learn either by him or because of him were actually very useful".

Andrew denied having sex with Giuffre on 10 March 2001, as she had claimed, because he said that he had been at home with his daughters after attending a party at PizzaExpress in Woking with his elder daughter, Princess Beatrice. Andrew said that he had "no recollection of ever meeting" Giuffre, and that he had "absolutely no memory" of a photograph taken of him with Giuffre at Ghislaine Maxwell's residence in London. Andrew said he had investigations carried out to establish whether the photograph was faked, but they had been inconclusive. He also claimed that he had never been upstairs in Maxwell's house and questioned his attire, saying that the clothes he wore in the photograph were his "travelling clothes" that he did not wear while in the country.

Andrew also added that Giuffre's claims about dancing with him at Tramp while he was sweaty were false due to his having temporarily lost the ability to sweat after an "adrenaline overdose" during the Falklands War. "Several doctors" told The Times they did not believe this explanation, as adrenaline overdose typically causes excessive sweating in humans. It has been previously said that his mother Elizabeth II was never seen sweating in public, raising the possibility of inherited anhidrosis (although this was not the explanation given by Andrew).

Andrew admitted to staying in Epstein's mansion for three days in 2010, after Epstein's conviction for sex offences against a minor, describing the location as "a convenient place to stay". However, he said, "I kick myself on a daily basis" for the decision "because it was not something that was becoming of a member of the royal family", adding that he "let the side down". Andrew said that he met Epstein for the sole purpose of breaking off any future relationship with him, saying that it was "the honourable and right thing to do". He said of himself that he was "too honourable" a person. He also said that, if "push came to shove" (and after consultation with his legal teams), he would be willing to testify under oath regarding his associations with Epstein.

== Aftermath ==
Maitlis and Newsnight believed the interview was approved by Queen Elizabeth II, although "palace insiders" speaking to The Sunday Telegraph disputed this. One of Andrew's official advisors, who opposed the interview, resigned just before it took place. Although Andrew was pleased with the interview – reportedly giving Maitlis and the Newsnight team a tour of Buckingham Palace – it received negative reactions from both the media and the public, both in and outside the UK. The interview was described as a "car crash", "nuclear explosion level bad", and the worst public relations crisis for the royal family since the death of Diana, Princess of Wales.

Hannah Bardell, then the MP for Livingston, called the interview "sickening" and stated, "Prince Andrew literally has no remorse or regard for the women abused and clearly does not see the problem with being pals with Epstein ... The systematic abuse of power is unbelievable." The Guardian wrote, "It was an exchange that summed up a grotesque mismatch between the Duke of York's language and demeanour, and the gravity of the allegations which continue to surround him; between the obtuse self-absorption of a prince and what we know of the appalling sexual exploitation of teenage girls by his friend."

Within a week, a statement from Buckingham Palace announced that Andrew was suspending his public duties "for the foreseeable future". The decision, made with the consent of Elizabeth II, was accompanied by insistence that Andrew sympathised with Epstein's victims. In the days following the interview, Andrew relinquished his role as chancellor of the University of Huddersfield. The accountancy firm KPMG announced it would not be renewing its sponsorship of Andrew's entrepreneurial scheme Pitch@Palace, and Standard Chartered also withdrew its support. The palace later confirmed that Andrew was to step down from all 230 of his patronages.

On 28 January 2020, American attorney Geoffrey Berman stated that Andrew had provided "zero co-operation" with federal prosecutors and the Federal Bureau of Investigation (FBI) regarding the ongoing investigations into Epstein, despite his initial promise in the Newsnight interview when he said he was willing to help the authorities. In April 2020, it was reported that the Duke of York Young Champions Trophy would not be played any more, after all activities carried out by the Prince Andrew Charitable Trust were stopped. It was revealed in the next month that the trust was under investigation by the Charity Commission regarding some regulatory issues about £350,000 of payments to his former private secretary Amanda Thirsk.

According to The Times, senior personnel in the British Army and Royal Navy considered Andrew to be an embarrassment to the military and believed he should be stripped of his military roles. Newsweek reported that a majority of British citizens believed Andrew should be stripped of his titles and extradited to the United States.

In May 2020, it was announced that Andrew would permanently resign from all his public roles over his Epstein ties.

In 2021, Sigrid McCawley, one of Virginia Giuffre's lawyers, said that she believed the interview would strengthen the case against Andrew in legal action Giuffre was taking against him. McCawley stated that the interview would be part of the case against Andrew.

In January 2022, Queen Elizabeth II removed Andrew's military affiliations and royal patronages, and confirmed that he would no longer use the style "His Royal Highness" in any official capacity.

On 12 October 2025, British newspapers revealed that Andrew had sent an email to Epstein on 28 February 2011 – more than two months later than the date Andrew had told Emily Maitlis that he had severed all ties with Epstein — stating, "We are in this together and will have to rise above it." Later that month, Andrew announced that he would cease using his Duke of York title and honours. On 30 October, Buckingham Palace confirmed that King Charles III had initiated a formal process to remove all of Andrew's royal titles, honours, and styles — including the style "Prince" and "His Royal Highness". He would be known thereafter simply as Andrew Mountbatten-Windsor. On 2 November 2025, the Defence Secretary John Healey stated in a television interview on the BBC's Sunday with Laura Kuenssberg programme that the UK Government on advice of Charles III was also working to strip Andrew of his honorary military title of Vice-Admiral of Royal Navy.

On 19 February 2026, he was arrested on suspicions of misconduct in public office in connection with his ties to Epstein.

== Awards ==
Maitlis won the Network Presenter of the Year award at the RTS Television Journalism Awards in 2020, while the interview was awarded as the Interview of the Year and the Scoop of the Year.

The episode and production team were nominated in the news coverage category at the 2020 British Academy Television Awards.

== In popular culture ==
In 2022, the Kunts published a punk rock song titled "Prince Andrew Is a Sweaty Nonce", ridiculing Andrew's statement that he cannot sweat, and his statement that he was at Pizza Express Woking. It reached No. 20 in the UK singles chart.

Following the former Prince's arrest in 2026, a Reuters photograph by Phil Noble, showing a "shell-shocked, haunted" Andrew sitting in his car as he left the police station, earned international attention. The image was briefly hung at the Louvre by activists from Everyone Hates Elon under the title "He's Sweating Now", before being removed by museum staff after around 15 minutes. The caption referenced the former prince's comments in the Newsnight, in which he said accusations against him of sexual assault could not be believed because the person accusing him also described him as sweating, something he claimed was impossible for him to do.

== Adaptations ==
Sam McAlister, among the producers of Newsnight, published a memoir Scoops: Behind the Scenes of the BBC's Most Shocking Interviews (2022), about her role in getting the interview with Prince Andrew and related issues. In July 2022, it was announced that a film would be adapted from her book. Shooting started in early 2023. Titled Scoop, it was written by Peter Moffat and directed by Philip Martin. Starring Gillian Anderson and Rufus Sewell, it was released in 2024. The television miniseries A Very Royal Scandal was released later that year.

== See also ==
- Charles: The Private Man, the Public Role, 1994 documentary and interview with Charles, Prince of Wales
- "An Interview with HRH The Princess of Wales", 1995 interview with Diana, Princess of Wales
- Interviews with Prince Harry, Duke of Sussex
  - Oprah with Meghan and Harry, 2021 interview with Prince Harry and Meghan, Duchess of Sussex
  - Harry: The Interview, 2023 interview with Prince Harry only
