= Hawking (2004 film) =

2004 television film directed by Philip Martin

- DVD Cover
- Screenplay by: Peter Moffat
- Directed by: Philip Martin
- Starring: Benedict Cumberbatch; Michael Brandon; Tom Hodgkins; Lisa Dillon; Phoebe Nicholls; Adam Godley; Peter Firth; Tom Ward; John Sessions; Rohan Siva; Matthew Marsh; Anastasia Hille; Bertie Carvel; Christian Rubeck
- Music by: Murray Gold
- Country of origin: United Kingdom
- Original language: English

Production
- Executive producers: Laura Mackie; John Lynch
- Producer: Jessica Pope
- Cinematography: Julian Court
- Editor: Trevor Waite
- Running time: 90 minutes
- Production company: BBC Television

Original release
- Network: BBC Two
- Release: 13 April 2004

Hawking is a 2004 biographical drama television film directed by Philip Martin and written by Peter Moffat. Starring Benedict Cumberbatch, it chronicles Stephen Hawking's early years as a PhD student at the University of Cambridge, following his search for the beginning of time, and his struggle against motor neurone disease. It premiered in the UK in April 2004.

The film received positive reviews, with critics particularly lauding Cumberbatch's performance as Hawking. It received two British Academy Television Awards nominations: Best Single Drama and Best Actor (Cumberbatch). Cumberbatch won the Golden Nymph for Best Performance by an Actor in a TV Film or Miniseries.

Cumberbatch's portrayal of Hawking was the first portrayal of the physicist on screen not by himself. (Note: Hawking previously portrayed himself as a hologram in the Star Trek: The Next Generation episode "Descent", made regular guest appearances on the British comedy series TV Offal and multiple appearances voicing himself in The Simpsons.)

== Plot ==
At Stephen Hawking's 21st birthday party he meets a new friend, Jane Wilde. There is a strong attraction between the two and Jane is intrigued by Stephen's talk of stars and the universe, but realises that there is something very wrong with Stephen when he suddenly finds that he is unable to stand up. A stay in hospital results in a distressing diagnosis. Stephen has motor neurone disease and doctors don't expect him to survive for more than two years. Stephen returns to Cambridge where the new term has started without him. But he cannot hide from the reality of his condition through work because he can't find a subject for his PhD. While his colleagues throw themselves into academic and college life, Stephen's life seems to have been put on hold. He rejects the help of his supervisor Dennis Sciama and sinks into a depression. It is only Stephen's occasional meetings with Jane and her faith in him that seem to keep him afloat. The prevailing theory in cosmology at the time is Steady State, which argues that the universe had no beginning – it has always existed, and always will – and Steady State is dominated by Professor Fred Hoyle, a plain-speaking Yorkshireman, and one of the first science TV pundits.

Stephen gets an early glimpse of a paper by Hoyle that is to be presented at a Royal Society lecture. He works through the calculations, identifies a mistake, and publicly confronts Hoyle after he has finished speaking. The row causes a stir in the department but, more importantly, it seems to give Stephen the confidence to get started on his own work. At almost the same time Stephen is introduced to a new way of thinking about his subject by another physicist, Roger Penrose. Topology is an approach that uses concepts of shape rather than equations to think about the nature of the universe, and this proves to be the perfect tool for Stephen, who is starting to find it very difficult to write. Penrose's great passion is the fate of dying stars. When a star comes to the end of its life, it begins to collapse in on itself. His calculations suggest something extraordinary. The collapse of the dying star appears to continue indefinitely, until the star is infinitely dense, forming a black hole in space. And at the heart of this black hole, Penrose shows, is something scientists call a singularity. It is this which leads Stephen to his PhD subject. He has always had a niggling scepticism about Steady State Theory, and now he can begin to see a way of explaining the revolutionary and highly controversial idea that the universe might have had a beginning. Sciama is sceptical but supportive – glad to see his student fired up and ready to work. Meanwhile, Stephen's condition continues to decline, he writes and walks with difficulty and his speech is starting to slur. But he now has a focus for his energies and, with the support of Jane, enters a new phase. He also commits to his relationship with her, asking her to marry him and in doing so exhibiting a defiant determination to survive.

With his mind fired up, Stephen begins to work away at the implications of Penrose's discovery and starts to home in on the idea of a singularity. With remarkable insight – a real Eureka moment – he asks himself: what would happen if you ran Penrose's maths backwards? Instead of something collapsing into nothingness, what if nothingness exploded into something? And what if you applied this not to a star but to the whole universe? Answer: the universe really could have originated in a big bang. At last, Stephen enters a period of feverish academic work. He applies Penrose's theorems for collapsing stars to the universe itself. Justifying Sciama's faith in him, he produces a PhD of real brilliance and profound implications. In theory, at least, the big bang could have happened. Two years after his initial diagnosis, Stephen is not only still very much alive, but has played a part in a great scientific breakthrough which revolutionises the way people think about the universe. Today, the scientific consensus is that the universe started with a big bang: billions of years ago, a cosmic explosion brought space and time into existence.

A secondary, interwoven storyline follows a different but connected scientific quest. Unbeknownst to Hawking, just as he was being diagnosed in 1963, two American scientists were embarking on their own scientific mission. Their research was to produce hard evidence to support Hawking's theoretical work. Arno Allan Penzias and Robert Woodrow Wilson are encountered in a hotel room in Stockholm in 1978. They are being interviewed about their discovery on the eve of receiving the Nobel Prize for Physics. They describe how, in the hills above New Jersey, they scanned the skies with a radio-telescope, and began to pick up a strange radio signal from space. In time, the two scientists came to realise that they had detected the left-over heat of the first, ancient explosion that had created the universe. They had found the physical proof of the big bang.

== Cast ==
- Benedict Cumberbatch as Stephen Hawking
- Michael Brandon as Arno Allan Penzias
- Tom Hodgkins as Robert Woodrow Wilson
- Lisa Dillon as Jane Wilde
- Phoebe Nicholls as Isobel Hawking
- Adam Godley as Frank Hawking
- Peter Firth as Fred Hoyle
- Tom Ward as Roger Penrose
- John Sessions as Dennis Sciama
- Matthew Marsh as Dr. John Holloway
- Alice Eve as Martha Guthrie
- Rohan Siva as Jayant Narlikar

== Reception ==
=== Accolades ===
Hawking received two nominations at the 2005 British Academy Television Awards: Best Single Drama and Best Actor (Cumberbatch). At the Monte-Carlo Television Festival, Benedict Cumberbatch won the Golden Nymph for Best Performance by an Actor in a TV film or miniseries.
