= Philip Martin (director) =

British television director and screenwriter

Philip Martin is a British television director and screenwriter.

Martin directed the television drama Hawking (2004), which was nominated for the British Academy Television Award for Best Single Drama; the final installment of the ITV drama Prime Suspect (2006), which was nominated for the BAFTA for Best Drama Serial and won Martin the Primetime Emmy Award for Outstanding Directing for a Miniseries, Movie or Dramatic Special; and two episodes of the first series of Wallander (2008), which won the BAFTA for Best Drama Series and got him another Emmy nomination.

He also wrote and directed the BBC Films documentary Double Helix: The DNA Years (2004), and directed the BBC television drama Einstein and Eddington (2008). In 2009, he directed the Agatha Christie's Poirot adaptation of Murder on the Orient Express, which was first broadcast in the United States in July 2010.

== Filmography ==
- Richard Hillary: A Fighter Pilot's Story (2000)
- Double Helix: The DNA Years (2004) – documentary
- Hawking (2004)
- Bloodlines (2005)
- The Girls Who Came to Stay (2006)
- Prime Suspect: The Final Act (2006)
- Wallander (2008) – TV series: 2 episodes
- Einstein and Eddington (2008)
- Mo (2010)
- Agatha Christie's Poirot (2010) – TV series: Murder on the Orient Express
- Birdsong (2012) – TV serial: 2 episodes
- Japan in a Day (2012)
- The Forger (2014)
- The Crown (2016–17) – TV series: 7 episodes
- Catherine the Great (2019) – TV series: 4 episodes
- Night Sky (2022) – TV series: 3 episodes
- Scoop (2024)
- The Agency (2024) – TV series: 2 episodes
