= Dharmaveer 2 =

2024 biographical film by Pravin Tarde

- Theatrical release poster
- Directed by: Pravin Tarde
- Written by: Pravin Tarde
- Based on: Anand Dighe
- Produced by: Mangesh Desai & Umesh Bansal
- Starring: Prasad Oak; Kshitish Date
- Cinematography: Mahesh Limaye
- Edited by: Mayur Hardas
- Production companies: Zee Studios; Sahil Motion Arts
- Distributed by: Zee Studios
- Release date: 27 September 2024
- Running time: 160 minutes
- Country: India
- Language: Marathi
- Budget: ₹8 crore
- Box office: est.₹15.50 crore

Dharmaveer 2 is a 2024 Indian Marathi-language biographical political drama film written and directed by Pravin Tarde. It is produced by Umesh Bansal and Mangesh Desai under the banners of Zee Studios and Sahil Motion Arts. The film stars Prasad Oak and Kshitish Date in the lead roles. It is a sequel to the 2022 film Dharmaveer.

The film was originally scheduled to release in theatres on 9 August 2024. But due to heavy rains in Maharashtra, the release was postponed to 27 September 2024.

== Cast ==
- Prasad Oak as Anand Dighe
- Kshitish Date as Eknath Shinde
- Vijay Nikam as Mo. Da. Joshi
- Snehal Tarde as Anita Birje
- Makarand Padhye as Bal Thackeray
- Amit Jadhav as CBI Officer
- Anand Ingale as Shahajibapu Patil
- Abhijeet Khandkekar as Dadaji Bhuse
- Kedar Soman as Uday Samant
- Abhijit Thite as Shambhuraj Desai
- Uday Sabnis as Sandipanrao Bhumre
- Sachin Narkar as Pratap Sarnaik
- Suhas Lakhan as Ravindra Phatak
- Sunil Tawde as Bharatshet Gogawale
- Sham Mashalkar as Milind Narvekar
- Hrishikesh Joshi as Dnyanraj Chougule
- Sharad Ponkshe as himself
- Jagdish Chavan as Madan Kadam
- Pravin Tarde as Inspector Sahebrao Patkar
- Ramesh Pardeshi as Hemant Pawar
- Devendra Gaikwad as Aatmaram Thorat
- Jaywant Wadkar as Hawaldar
- Aniruddha Dindorkar as Prakash Gupte
- Digambar Naik
- Hardeek Joshi
- Eknath Shinde as himself (Cameo)

== Plot ==
Dharamveer 2 continues the saga by delving into the life of Anand Dighe. This dynamic and emotionally charged journey explores the untold aspects of the charismatic leader's life and his profound impact on ordinary people. The film offers a captivating perspective on present-day politics and its intriguing connections to the past.

== Production ==
In January 2023, the success of Dharmaveer, the producer Mangesh Desai later said that its story is incomplete, hence another part will be made. After this, in August 2023, officially announced the making of sequel. The shooting started in December 2023 in Thane.

== Soundtrack ==
No.	Title	Lyrics	Singer(s)	Length
1.	"Chal Karu Tayari"	Prasad Biware	Vishal Dadlani & Bela Shende	02:40
2.	"Asa Ha Dharmaveer"	Vishwajit Joshi	Sukhwinder Singh	4:41
3.	"chal karu Taiyari"	Avinash-Vishwajeet	Vishal Dadlani & Bela Shende	4:35
4.	"Aali Shivsena"	Mangesh kangane	Adarsh Shinde & Avinash-Vishwajeet	3:44
5.	"Jagel Anand Maza"	Mangesh kangane	Hariharan & Chinar-Mahesh	6:45
6.	"Jagel Anand Maza - Reprise"	Mangesh kangane	Hariharan & Chinar-Mahesh	6:45

== Release ==
=== Marketing ===
On 30 June 2024, an event was held in Mumbai where Maharashtra Chief Minister Eknath Shinde and Bobby Deol unveiled the poster.

The teaser was released on 9 July 2024. The trailer of the film was released on 20 July 2024.

The trailer launch event was attended by Maharashtra Chief Minister Eknath Shinde along with Bollywood actors Salman Khan, Govinda, Jeetendra, Jackky Bhagnani and his wife actress Rakul Preet Singh.

=== Theatrical ===
The film was scheduled to be released on 9 August 2024 in Marathi, along with a dubbed version in Hindi. However, due to rain, the release was postponed to 27 September 2024.

=== Home media ===
The streaming rights for the film were acquired by ZEE5 and it started streaming on the platform on 25 October 2024.

== Box office ==
Dharmaveer 2 earned ₹1.92 crore on its opening day. The film collected ₹7.65 crore in its opening weekend.

The film grossed ₹15.5–15.47 crore in its final theatrical run.
