= Peter Moffat =

British playwright and screenwriter

- Born: 2 June 1962 (age 64); Edinburgh, Scotland
- Occupations: Playwright; screenwriter
- Spouse: Leonora Klein
- Children: 2

Alexander Peter Moffat (born 2 June 1962) is a Scottish playwright and screenwriter. His best-known plays are Nabokov's Gloves and Iona Rain. A qualified barrister, he became known for writing three British television legal dramas: North Square, Criminal Justice, and Silk. Moffat also wrote the 2024 docudrama film Scoop based on Prince Andrew's 2019 interview with Newsnight.

== Early life ==
Peter Moffat was on 2 June 1962 in Edinburgh, Scotland, to John Laidlaw Moffat, who was in the Royal Military Police, and Norma Guthrie. His grandfather and great-grandfather were shepherds in Tweedsmuir. Their lives inspired his television series The Village. Moffat's father joined the Colonial Police Force in Tanganyika and later the Army, so the family, including young Peter, moved from country to country every two years, which inspired his series The Last Post.

== Career ==
=== Plays ===
Moffat's first play was Fine and Private Place and was broadcast on BBC Radio in 1997. His best-known plays are Nabokov's Gloves and Iona Rain.

=== Writing for screen ===
Moffat is a former barrister; one of his early commissions was for an episode of Kavanagh QC. He has since created three British television legal dramas: North Square, Criminal Justice and Silk. He also wrote the miniseries Cambridge Spies and the television film Einstein and Eddington, as well as a reinterpretation of William Shakespeare's Macbeth for the BBC's ShakespeaRe-Told series.

Moffat wrote the historical drama series The Village, depicting life in a Derbyshire village through the eyes of a central character, Bert Middleton. The first series, covering the years 1914 to 1920 in six episodes, premiered on BBC1 in 2013, and a second and final series, set in the 1920s, was made in 2014. Moffat envisioned more series, totalling up to 42 episodes that would continue the story through the 20th century. The proposed project was similar to the German film series Heimat, written and directed by Edgar Reitz, which told the story of a German family from 1919 to 2000.

The BBC broadcast Moffat's drama series Undercover in 2016. Moffat took inspiration for the fictional drama from real-life revelations about British police officers who had formed long-term relationships with activists they were investigating while undercover, as well as from the London Metropolitan Police Service's secret surveillance of the family of murdered teenager Stephen Lawrence.

His drama series Your Honor, starring Bryan Cranston as a conflicted New Orleans judge, began its run on Showtime on 6 December 2020.

Moffat wrote the 2024 film Scoop based on Prince Andrew's 2019 interview with Newsnight.

In February 2024, it was reported that Moffat was writing a drama series about the contaminated blood scandal for ITV. In January 2026, it was commissioned under the title Bad Blood, with filming set to commence in March.

== Awards ==
Moffat won the Writer's Award from the Broadcasting Press Guild for North Square, and was nominated for a BAFTA Award in 2004 for writing Hawking, a TV drama about the scientist Stephen Hawking. In 2009, he was awarded two BAFTAs for Criminal Justice, one for Best Television Drama Serial and one for Best Craft Writer.

== Personal life ==
Moffat married barrister and author Leonora Klein and they have two children. Moffat has lived in London since around 1993 and by 2013 considered himself a Londoner

== See also ==
- List of British playwrights since 1950
- List of people from Edinburgh
- List of Scottish writers
