= Cadbury Sixth Form College =

Location
- Downland Close; Birmingham, West Midlands, B38 8QT; England

Information
- Established: 1983
- Local authority: Birmingham
- Specialist: Sixth form college
- Department for Education URN: 130469 Tables
- Ofsted: Reports
- Principal: Julia Stevens
- Gender: Mixed
- Age: 16 to 19
- Enrolment: 800
- Website: http://www.cadcol.ac.uk

Cadbury Sixth Form College is a sixth form college in Kings Norton, Birmingham, United Kingdom. It takes students from over 100 schools in the West Midlands. The College's Principal is Julia Stevens who was appointed in 2019.

Founded in 1983, the College building was the former Kings Norton Mixed School. The College was established alongside Josiah Mason College and Joseph Chamberlain Sixth Form College, each named after a figure in Birmingham's history—John Cadbury, Josiah Mason, and Joseph Chamberlain.

The college's curriculum is mostly at Level 3 with some at Level 2. It offers over 50 subjects at Advanced and BTEC level.

== Merge with Sandwell College ==
In November 2018, the College merged with Sandwell College.

== Alumni ==
- Eniola Aluko
- Lauren Crace
- Lewis Goodall
