= VC 571 =

- Directed by: Avinash Dhyani
- Screenplay by: Avinash Dhyani
- Story by: Avinash Dhyani
- Produced by: Manish Kumar; Capt. Manoj Kumar Singh; Avinash Dhyani; Mohit Tyagi
- Starring: Avinash Dhyani; Aarti Shah; Virendra Saxena; Rashmi Nautiyal; Rahul Mishra
- Cinematography: Ramesh Samant
- Edited by: Dhananjay Dhyani
- Music by: Mudit Baunthiyal; Akhil Maurya; Jayant Rawat; Khushi Gahtiyari
- Production companies: Padma Siddhi Films; Dream Sky Creations; Alaska Motion Pictures
- Release date: 26 May 2024
- Country: India
- Language: Hindi

VC 571 is an upcoming Indian war film about VC Rifleman Gabar Singh Negi, a member of the Garhwal Rifles during World War I.

== Cast ==
- Avinash Dhyani as Gabar Singh Negi
- Virendra Saxena as Bisan Dutt
- Aarti Shah as Satoori Devi
- Rashmi Nautiyal as Gabar’s mother
- Rahul Mishra as Dr. Rautela character
- Manish Kumar as Jeetu
- Manoj Kumar singh as Jatan Singh
- Reza Khan as Abdullah
- Abhishek Maindola as Diwakar
