= Scoop (2024 film) =

Film by Philip Martin

- Release poster
- Directed by: Philip Martin
- Written by: Peter Moffat; Geoff Bussetil
- Based on: Scoops by Sam McAlister
- Produced by: Radford Neville; Hilary Salmon
- Starring: Gillian Anderson; Keeley Hawes; Billie Piper; Rufus Sewell
- Cinematography: Nanu Segal
- Edited by: Kristina Hetherington
- Music by: Anne Nikitin; Hannah Peel
- Production companies: The Lighthouse Film and Television; Voltage TV
- Distributed by: Netflix
- Release date: 5 April 2024
- Running time: 103 minutes
- Country: United Kingdom
- Language: English

Scoop is a 2024 British biographical drama film directed by Philip Martin, starring Gillian Anderson, Keeley Hawes, Billie Piper, and Rufus Sewell. It is a dramatic retelling of the process of securing and filming the 2019 BBC television interview of the then Prince Andrew, Duke of York (later Andrew Mountbatten-Windsor) by presenter and journalist Emily Maitlis and the production team at the BBC Two news and current affairs programme Newsnight. The screenplay by Peter Moffat and Geoff Bussetil is adapted from the 2022 book Scoops by former Newsnight editor Sam McAlister.

The film is a behind-the-scenes story of the women who negotiated with the Buckingham Palace establishment to secure the "scoop of the decade.” Their televised interview, which focused on Prince Andrew's relationship with convicted sex offender Jeffrey Epstein and allegations of Andrew's sexual assault of a minor, was the public catalyst for the downfall of the Duke of York. The interview was later described as less a car crash than "a plane crashing into an oil tanker, causing a tsunami, triggering a nuclear explosion."

The film was released on 5 April 2024 on Netflix.

== Plot ==
In 2010, New York City paparazzo Jae Donnelly stakes out the private Manhattan home of Jeffrey Epstein for an exclusive shot. After a chase through Central Park, he gets photographs of Prince Andrew walking with Epstein.

Nine years later, directly after major staffing cuts are announced, BBC Newsnight producer Sam McAlister comes across the photo in an article amid the resurfacing of sexual assault allegations against Epstein. Sam reaches out to Jae for more information about the circumstances surrounding the photo, and contacts Prince Andrew's press team about the possibility of arranging an interview.

Meanwhile, PR representative Jason Stein encourages Prince Andrew's private secretary, Amanda Thirsk, to reach out to "friendly" reporters to conduct one-on-one interviews to improve Andrew's image. Amanda agrees to meet with Sam and negotiate terms for an interview, ostensibly discussing his charity work.

Jae gets back to Sam, sharing photos of young girls going in and out of Epstein's Manhattan home. He insists that Epstein has been trafficking girls for years and his reputation as a predator is an open secret in his circles.

The next day, Amanda invites Sam to have tea at Buckingham Palace. Amanda reveals herself to be unusually close with Andrew. Sam convinces Amanda to leave the palace grounds for a drink. While Sam makes an impression by promising honesty from Newsnight, no deal is made.

Later that night, Sam receives a call from Jae to let her know that Epstein is about to be taken into custody by the FBI for child sex trafficking. After informing programme editor Esme Wren of the situation, Sam rushes to Amanda's house to convince her to give Newsnight a TV interview when the story breaks. Amanda holds off, but after the story blows up in the press and Epstein is found dead in his jail cell, rumours circulate about the nature of Andrew's friendship with Epstein.

Sam secures a negotiation meeting in Buckingham Palace and brings Newsnight host Emily Maitlis to meet with Amanda, Andrew, and his daughter Beatrice. Sam tells Andrew that the old method of staying silent in the wake of scandal is no longer effective, and that an exclusive with them will be an opportunity for him to tell his side of things. Jason encourages Amanda to turn down the interview as they have made no conditions about its release, but Amanda is convinced that Andrew's charisma will win over viewers. Jason quits in frustration and Newsnight secures the interview. Feeling that they are sitting on the "scoop of the decade," Emily, Esme, and the segment producers begin preparations, making plans to use a combative approach with their questions, and confront him with facts.

On 14 November 2019, the Newsnight crew go to the Palace for the interview. With Sam's encouragement, Emily decides to use a less confrontational approach with her interview questions, letting Andrew talk and feel comfortable instead. Andrew, Amanda, and the Palace staff are thrilled with the results, and the televised interview is broadcast on 16 November 2019. In it, Emily's questions focus on Andrew's relationship with Ghislaine Maxwell and convicted sex offender Epstein, and allegations of Andrew's sexual assault of a minor named Virginia Giuffre, which Andrew denies.

The interview is a disaster for Andrew: his apparent lack of remorse and accountability on-screen – along with erratic statements about visiting a PizzaExpress in Woking and an apparent inability to sweat – are poorly received and widely ridiculed. The interview goes viral and turns into a PR crisis for the Royal Family. Soon afterwards, Amanda is fired and an announcement is made that Andrew has chosen to step down from his royal duties. The Newsnight team, meanwhile, receives acclaim for their efforts, and Sam is praised by Emily and Esme for her time and hard work putting the story together.

An epilogue states that the interview was Newsnight's most watched segment ever recorded, winning multiple awards. Andrew was later stripped of his royal titles, and, despite not admitting guilt, in 2022 he settled out of court for £12 million for Virginia Giuffre's civil lawsuit for alleged sexual assault. Sam McAlister left the BBC in 2021 to teach negotiation at the London School of Economics.

== Cast ==
- Gillian Anderson as Emily Maitlis
- Keeley Hawes as Amanda Thirsk
- Billie Piper as Sam McAlister
- Rufus Sewell as Prince Andrew, Duke of York
- Romola Garai as Esme Wren
- Richard Goulding as Stewart Maclean
- Amanda Redman as Netta McAlister
- Connor Swindells as Jae Donnelly
- Lia Williams as Fran Unsworth
- Colin Wells as Jeffrey Epstein
- Aoife Hinds as Rebecca
- Paul Popplewell as an editor
- Jordan Kouamé as Freddy
- Andrew MacBean as Tony Hall
- Charity Wakefield as Princess Beatrice of York
- Zach Colton as Lucas McAlister

== Production ==
An adaptation of former Newsnight producer Sam McAlister's 2022 book Scoops: Behind the Scenes of the BBC's Most Shocking Interviews by Peter Moffat for The Lighthouse Film & Television and Voltage TV was announced in July 2022. Moffat said the adaptation was concentrating on "how the BBC's Newsnight team got the scoop...[and]...Why did he agree to do it?" It would be directed by Philip Martin and produced by Hilary Salmon and Radford Neville for The Lighthouse and Sanjay Singhal for Voltage TV. Anderson, Sewell, Hawes and Piper were announced as part of the cast in February 2023. McAlister, who was in part responsible for negotiating and booking the Prince, said it was "a pinch myself moment" to be played by Piper. Hawes was cast to play Prince Andrew's former Private Secretary Amanda Thirsk.

=== Filming ===
Principal photography commenced in early 2023. Shots of Anderson in costume as Maitlis on set were revealed online in late February 2023.

== Release ==
The film was released on 5 April 2024 on Netflix.

== Reception ==
On the review aggregator website Rotten Tomatoes, 76% of 84 critics' reviews are positive, with an average rating of 6.7/10. The website's consensus reads: "Scoop wrings riveting drama out of its real-life story, even if the actual interview footage remains an arguably superior watch." Metacritic, which uses a weighted average, assigned the film a score of 63 out of 100, based on 19 critics, indicating "generally favorable" reviews.

=== Accolades ===
It was nominated for the 2025 Broadcast Awards in the Best Single Drama category. In March 2025, Billie Piper was nominated for Leading Actress at the 2025 British Academy Television Awards.

== See also ==
- A Very Royal Scandal – 2024 miniseries produced for Amazon Prime Video about the same interview, with Maitlis's participation
