= Anand Dighe =

Indian politician

Dharmaveer Anand Dighe

Thane Unit Chief of Shiv Sena
- In office 1984 - 2001
- Preceded by: Moreshwar Damodar Joshi alias Mo.Da. Joshi
- Succeeded by: Eknath Shinde

Personal details
- Born: Anand Chintamani Dighe; 27 January 1951 Apta, Bombay State, India
- Died: 26 August 2001 (aged 50) Thane, Maharashtra, India
- Citizenship: Indian
- Party: Shiv Sena
- Occupation: Politician and social worker
- Nickname(s): Dharmaveer; Anand Dighe Saheb

Anand Chintamani Dighe (27 January 1951 – 26 August 2001), popularly known as Dharmaveer was an Indian right-wing politician and social worker. He was a prominent public figure in Thane district and the unit chief of the Shiv Sena political party. He mentored many young politicians from the Thane region including Naresh Mhaske, Rajan Vichare, Ravindra Phatak and Eknath Shinde.

== Career ==
Dighe was born to a Chandraseniya Kayastha Prabhu family and joined politics at a young age. He became president of Shiv Sena's Thane unit in 1984. Dighe was a grassroots leader with a large support base and was popularly known as Dharmaveer. He was considered a powerful muscleman in Thane. He would hold a daily Durbar at his Tembhi Naka residence to hear out/resolve issues faced by Thane citizens along with Shiv Sena party workers.

Dighe was accused of the murder of Shiv Sena party member Sridhar Khopkar, who had allegedly voted for INC in 1989. Dighe was arrested under Terrorist and Disruptive Activities (Prevention) Act, 1987 and was released on bail. The investigation continued until his death.

== Death and legacy ==
Dighe was hospitalised in August 2001 after a car accident, suffering from minor injuries to his leg. During his treatment, hospital management announced that Dighe died of a heart attack. His followers believed that he died because of medical negligence, leading to riots that culminated with the destruction of Sunitidevi Singhania Hospital in Thane. Some followers believed that he was killed due to his popularity and there are many conspiracy theories related to Anand Dighe's death.

Eknath Shinde, Dighe's former mentee and future Chief Minister of Maharashtra, has asserted that he knows information about his death that would cause a "political earthquake" if he were to reveal it. Former Lok Sabha MP Nilesh Narayan Rane made a similar hint.

The Dharmaveer Anand Dighe Natyamandir, a modern theater with an auditorium built in Ambernath is named in his honour.

== Popular culture ==
The 2022 Marathi biopic Dharmaveer was based on Dighe's life. Prasad Oak played the role of Dighe in the movie. A sequel, Dharmaveer 2, was released in 2024.
