= Nahir Galarza case =

2017 murder in Argentina

Murder of Fernando Pastorizzo
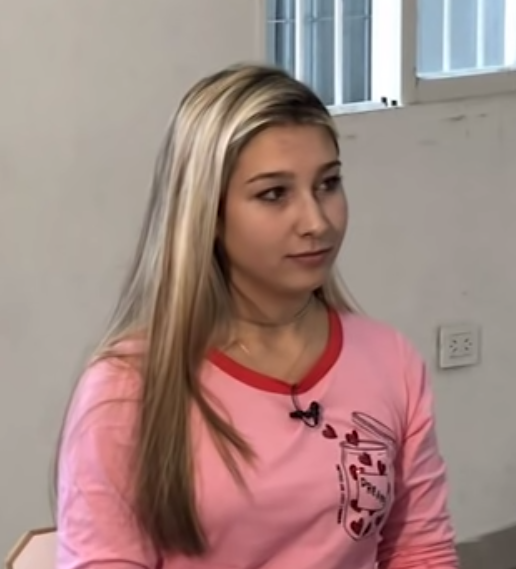
- Nahir Galarza being interviewed in prison, 2019
- Location: Gualeguaychú, Entre Ríos, Argentina
- Date: 29 December 2017; 8 years ago c. 05:22 a.m. (UTC−03:00)
- Attack type: Murder by shooting
- Weapon: 9 mm pistol
- Victim: Fernando Pastorizzo
- Perpetrator: Nahir Galarza
- Convictions: Aggravated homicide
- Sentence: Life imprisonment with possibility of parole after 35 years

The Nahir Galarza case (officially Galarza, Nahir Mariana s/homicidio doblemente agravado) was an Argentine judicial process in which 19-year-old Nahir Mariana Galarza (born 11 September 1998) was convicted of murdering her 20-year-old boyfriend Fernando Pastorizzo (born 3 January 1997) at dawn on 29 December 2017, in the city of Gualeguaychú, Entre Ríos, Argentina, where both lived. The case was widely covered by both national and international media.

Galarza was sentenced to life imprisonment for homicide, which was aggravated by the fact that she and Pastorizzo had been in a stable romantic relationship.

== Perpetrator ==
Nahir Galarza was born on 11 September 1998 to Yamila Kroh and Marcelo Galarza, an officer of the provincial police. At the time of the crime, Galarza was a law student at Universidad de Concepción del Uruguay and played field hockey.

When she was sixteen, there was a kidnapping report after she went missing for one day, but it was soon discovered that the kidnapping was false.

== Background ==
Both Galarza and the victim, Fernando Gabriel Pastorizzo, lived in Gualeguaychú, a city with a population of around 100,000 inhabitants located 25 km (15.5 mi) west of the border with Uruguay. Around 2012 they started a relationship whose nature was one of the main objects of discussion in the case. While Galarza's defenders supported the thesis that the couple only had casual sexual encounters, the prosecution upheld the version that they constituted a couple, even though they did not live together. The latter version was the one accepted by the court. In January 2018, investigators confirmed, through text messages and some photographs of Pastorizzo and Galarza together with her family, that they travelled to Brazil in the summer of 2016, which strongly supported the couple thesis in addition to confirming that Galarza's family knew Pastorizzo, which they initially denied.

Another theme regarding the case was the circumstances under which the couple's relationship developed. Pieces of evidence such as text messages, Twitter posts, testimonies and others suggest that it was full of violence, fights, and temporary reconciliations. To Galarza's family, she was the one suffering violence from Pastorizzo. Her mother, Yamina Kroh, said that her defenders and prosecutors maintained opposite stances; while the former claimed that the aggressor was the victim, Pastorizzo, the latter claimed it was the accused, Galarza. However, the court dismissed that Galarza suffered physical violence from Pastorizzo. The Superior Justice Court of Entre Ríos asserted that "Nahir Galarza's defense wanted to demonize the victim". Regarding this matter there was also much commentary, with numerous opinions and declarations—some from friends and family of both Galarza and Pastorizzo—that were published on social media.

== Crime ==
Fernando Pastorizzo was murdered on 26 December 2017, at the Tomás de Rocamora neighbourhood in Gualeguaychú, by two firearm shots. His body was found lying on the ground, beside his motorcycle, without signs of robbery. Shortly before the murder, he was driving Galarza on his motorcycle. The girl then walked about twenty blocks back to her home.

After Pastorizzo's corpse was found in the morning, Galarza published a photograph of her and Pastorizzo on social media with the following description:

5 years together, fighting, going forward and coming back, but always with the same love. I love you forever, my angel.

— Nahir Galarza, December 2017.

Galarza acknowledged her authorship of the crime first to her parents and then to authorities. She asserted that she shot with her father's gun, a 9 mm she had taken with her, and then returned it to where she had found it without her father noticing. She also explained that she first shot him in his back and then in his chest.

In footage obtained by police from a private security camera, a person physically similar to Galarza is seen walking around 5:22 a.m. some six blocks away from the location of Pastorizzo's murder. According to the prosecution, this footage was pivotal in situating Galarza in the crime scene, even though her family denied that the person filmed was her.

Galarza was prosecuted for "bond-aggravated homicide" and she was arrested under preventive detention, a condition under which she remained until her conviction.

== Conviction ==
On 3 July 2018, Nahir Galarza was declared guilty of aggravated murder (which means her crime was considered more serious because she was in a stable relationship with the victim) and condemned to life imprisonment. Even though the court rejected aggravations for firearm usage and cheating that were proposed by the prosecution, this sentence means that Galarza would effectively have to serve at least 35 years in prison.

To date, she is the youngest woman in Argentina to have been sentenced to life imprisonment (she was 19 years, 7 months and 21 days old at the time). However, she is not the youngest woman to have committed the act punishable with that sentence. In 2016, also in Entre Ríos, Paula Araceli Benítez received the same sentence for the murder of her mother when she was 18 in April 2015, but at the moment of her conviction she was only 19 years, 8 months and 1 day old, a few days older than Galarza.

Evidence that Galarza and Pastorizzo had a stable union was obtained from testimonies and documents such as photographs, text and internet messages, etc., while forensic analysis rejected the thesis that the shots were accidental (according to an expert, the first of the two shots had a 50% percent of being accidental, but the second was clearly intentional, 50 centimeters from Pastorizzo). Finally, it was concluded that there was no evidence of aggression by Pastorizzo, rejecting this extenuating circumstance proposed by Galarza's defense.

On 4 September 2018, it was announced that Galarza would be transferred to a common women's penitentiary, Unidad Penal 6 de Paraná, after staying the longest time allowed by law under custody in a police station (eight months). Finally, on 10 September, Entre Ríos' penitentiary service transferred Nahir Galarza to the penitentiary, the only women's jail in Entre Ríos, where Galarza and other nine inmates reside.

In August 2019, an appellate court rejected an appeal by Galarza's defense, confirming her life imprisonment. In that same year, it was reported that Galarza, among other activities in prison, dedicated herself to the study of psychology.

In March 2020, the Supreme Justice Court of Entre Ríos rejected another appeal to revert Nahir Galarza's life imprisonment. In total, her defense made two appeals, and both were rejected.

In January 2022, with help from her mother Yanina Kroh, Galarza hired a different defender. They then reported Galarza's father and Kroh's husband, Marcelo Galarza, for aggression, but this accusation was rejected. Notwithstanding, there is a restraining order prohibiting Marcelo Galarza from getting close to either Kroh or the penitentiary where his daughter resides.

The National Court is the last and only means of appeal that Galarza's defense still has to revise her life imprisonment.

== Reception ==
The murder of young Pastorizzo was widely covered by both Argentine media and some international media. It made the headlines of several newspapers and was the focus of numerous news reports in radio and television. A few days after the event came to light, the Galarza family hired a public relations agent that provided the press with some photographs of Nahir Galarza when she was a baby.

The case was also the subject of diverging opinions on social media. The personal accounts of Galarza were filled with both support and condemnation messages. Her Instagram account was terminated after her imprisonment, but came back twelve days later on Tuesday, 10 January, with some changes such as blurred photos and some profiles unfollowed. It surpassed 30,000 followers in only twenty four hours. Shortly afterwards, however, the account was removed again. This was followed by numerous follower-made accounts posting pictures of Galarza.

On 2 January 2018, a demonstration took place in front of Gualeguaychú's courts, with hundreds of people holding signs and pictures of the victim, Fernando Pastorizzo, protesting against the supposedly privileged conditions under which Nahir Galarza found herself.

On 3 January 2018, the day in which Pastorizzo would turn 21, friends and family members published a supporting message and photographs of him with memories, asking for justice and repudiating Galarza's crime.

On 10 July 2018, a group called Todo preso es político ("Every prisoner is a political prisoner") promoted a demonstration in front of Casa de Entre Ríos in Buenos Aires to demand "immediate freedom" for Galarza, with slogans such as "A male's death is not just a metaphor; fear will change sides". This group speaks about "hetero-patriarchal violence" and "hegemonic feminism" and asserted that "in the last six months Nahir Galarza has suffered a true witch hunt led by communication means, the judiciary and the commonly called public opinion".

== List of media centered on the case ==
=== Literature ===
- 2018, Nahir, La historia desconocida ("Nahir, The Unknown Story") by Mauro Szeta (ISBN 9789500762274).
- 2021, El silencio de Nahir ("Nahir's Silence") by Jorge Zonzini (ISBN 9789504974154).

=== Television ===
- In January 2022, a television series called Nahir: la historia desconocida, based on the book with the same name by Mauro Szeta and Mauro Fulco, was announced on HBO Max. To date, the series has not premiered.
- In June 2024, a two-episode documentary titled Nahir, el secreto de un crimen ("Nahir, the Secret of a Crime") premiered on Prime Video. It covers the case from different points of view and includes testimonies from Galarza, her parents and friends and Pastorizzo's family.

=== Film ===
- In May 2024, the film Nahir, with actress Valentina Zenere in the role of Nahir Galarza, premiered on Prime Video.
