= Nahir (film) =

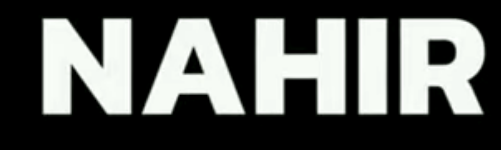
- logo movie
- Directed by: Hernán Guerschuny
- Written by: Sofia Wilhelmi
- Story by: Sofia Wilhelmi
- Based on: Nahir Galarza Case
- Starring: Valentina Zenere; Monica Antonopulos; Simón Hempe; Nacho Gadano; Felipe Canullan
- Cinematography: INCAA
- Production company: Zeppelin Studios
- Distributed by: Amazon Prime
- Release date: May 22, 2024
- Running time: 122 minutes
- Country: Argentina
- Language: Spanish

Nahir is an Argentine film belonging to the crime-drama genre fused with fiction and reality from 2024, starring Valentina Zenere, Monica Antonopulos, Simón Hempe, Nacho Gadano and Felipe Ganullan. The film is based on the Nahir Galarza case, the 19-year-old Argentine girl sentenced to life imprisonment for the crime of her boyfriend Fernando Pastorizzo. The film is directed by Hernan Guerschuny.

== Post production ==
The film begins its production stage in 2023, since in March of that same year, through the official Amazon Prime Video Instagram account, it published a mini teaser of the film with an estimated duration of 58 seconds, in which you can see Valentina Zenere playing Nahir Galarza saying ''I'm Nahir Galarza, they don't want to know what happened that night. Or is it?'' Staring and asking the viewer, when the title of the film was shown, it was confirmed that the film was already in the filming stage. The recordings were carried out in the city of Buenos Aires, Capital Federal, which meant they had to create sets to recreate the place of the events, since the film could not be recorded in gualeguaychú – Entre Ríos (place where the crime occurred) since The residents of the city opposed it, considering it a "lack of respect for Fernando's family." The film finished filming in July 2023 at 3:00 am (-UTC) and it was estimated that the film would be brought to the big screen at the end of March 2024.

== Premiere ==
The film had a premiere in 240 countries, in Argentina it hit movie theaters on May 22, 2024 as well as its premiere on Streaming platforms.

== Cast ==
- Valentina Zenere such as Nahir Galarza, a first-year law student at the University of Concepción del Uruguay, who was convicted of the murder of her partner, Fernando Pastorizzo, becoming the youngest woman to have been sentenced to life imprisonment in Argentina.
- Simon Hempé such as Fernando Pastorizzo, Nahir's boyfriend who was murdered in the early hours of December 29, 2017, after receiving two gunshot wounds.
- César Bordón como as Marcelo Galarza, police official and Nahir's Father.
- Mónica Antonópulos as Yamina Kroh, Nahir's Mother.
- Nacho Gadano as Jorge Zonzin, celebrity media manager whom Nahir's parents hired as their official spokesperson.
