= Amanda Thirsk =

Former private secretary of Prince Andrew

Amanda Thirsk LVO
- Born: 4 July 1965 (age 60)
- Education: St Paul's Girls' School
- Alma mater: Selwyn College, Cambridge
- Known for: Private secretary to Prince Andrew, Duke of York; Chief executive of Pitch@Palace

Amanda Jane Thirsk LVO (born 4 July 1965) is a British courtier and business executive who served as private secretary to Prince Andrew, Duke of York from 2012 to 2020. As of 2024, she works in business development at the Chinese e-commerce company JD.com.

== Early life ==
She was educated at St Paul's Girls' School and completed a law degree at Selwyn College, Cambridge in 1987.

== Royal Household ==
Thirsk joined the royal household in 2004, as Prince Andrew's office controller. In this role she was responsible for his public and private finances. She became his private secretary in 2012.

=== Newsnight interview ===
Thirsk was instrumental in organising Prince Andrew's infamous 2019 Newsnight interview, which received widespread negative reaction, and was described as "disastrous". Andrew withdrew from royal duties following the interview, and Thirsk was moved from the role of private secretary, to become chief executive of Pitch@Palace.

She was portrayed by Keeley Hawes in the 2024 film Scoop, and by Joanna Scanlan in the 2024 drama A Very Royal Scandal.

=== Pitch@Palace ===
The Pitch@Palace initiative was founded by Prince Andrew in 2014 to support entrepreneurs by amplifying and accelerating their business ideas. Pitch@Palace Global Limited was founded in February 2017, and held in the name of Thirsk. Thirsk became chief executive of Pitch@Palace in November 2019, following Andrew's withdrawal from royal duties. Thirsk resigned as chief executive of Pitch@Palace in April 2020, and by early 2021, ownership was transferred to Knox House Trustees (UK) Limited, a company ultimately owned by Doug Barrowman.

== Personal life ==
Her husband, Jeremy, was a banker who worked as chief financial officer of Enron in Asia, and died of a heart attack in 2007, aged 46.

== Honours ==
She was made a Lieutenant of the Royal Victorian Order in the 2013 Birthday Honours.
