= Sam McAlister =

English TV producer and author

Samantha McAlister is an English TV producer, criminal barrister and author. She is best known for securing an interview with Prince Andrew, Duke of York for BBC Newsnight's programme "Prince Andrew & the Epstein Scandal" (2019).

The interview gained worldwide attention and strong criticism of Prince Andrew. It led to him resigning from all public roles. However, the circumstances of the interview and work done in preparation for it are challenged by Andrew Lownie. His book on Sarah Ferguson and Andrew (Entitled) suggests that journalist Laura Burns, working for Panorama, provided and did the research that the interview used but was not credited in any way for her work.

McAlister wrote and published a memoir, titled Scoops (2021). Her account of the Prince Andrew interview was adapted as a feature film, Scoop (2024), in which McAlister was portrayed by Billie Piper.

== Early life and education ==
McAlister was born in Guildford, England. She was the first in her family to attend university, graduating from the University of Edinburgh, and undertaking a law conversion course at City University.

== Career ==
McAlister worked as a trained criminal defence barrister. She later worked for ten years as a Producer on the BBC Newsnight programme, before taking voluntary redundancy in 2021. She was particularly focused on investigating and arranging interviews, and is known for her role in gaining BBC's interview in 2019 with Prince Andrew. The episode of the Prince Andrew interview was nominated for an award in news coverage category at the 2020 British Academy Television Awards.

By 2024, McAlister was working as a Visiting Senior Fellow in the law school of the London School of Economics. She specialised in teaching negotiations.

== Personal life ==
McAlister is a single parent.
