= Emily Maitlis =

British journalist (born 1970)

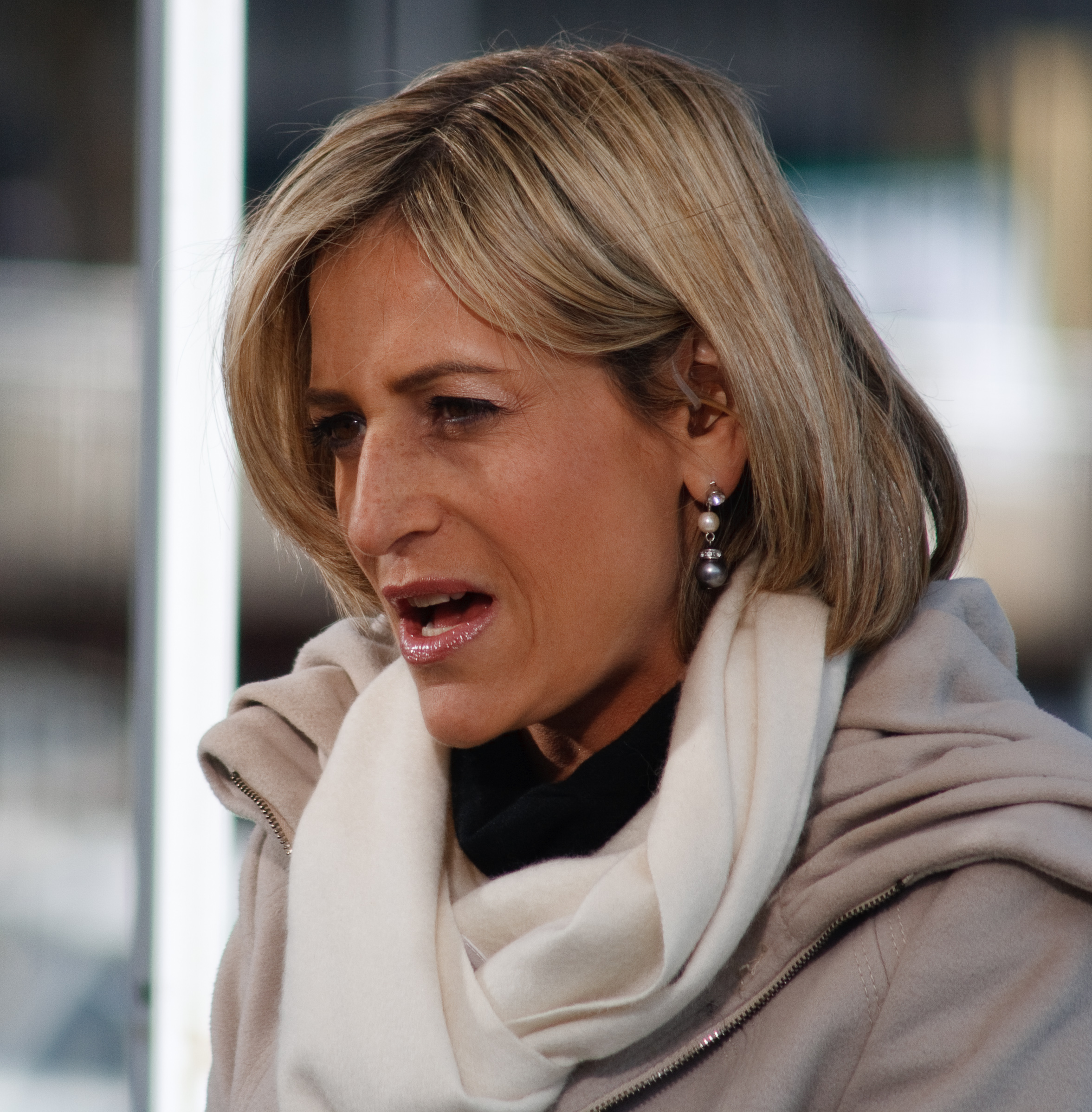
- Maitlis in 2010
- Born: 6 September 1970 (age 56); Hamilton, Ontario, Canada
- Citizenship: United Kingdom
- Education: Queens' College, Cambridge (BA)
- Occupations: Journalist; news presenter
- Employers: BBC (2005–2022); Global (2022–present)
- Notable credits: BBC News Channel; BBC London News; Newsnight; BBC News at One; BBC News at Five; BBC News at Six; BBC News at Ten; BBC Weekend News
- Spouse: Mark Gwynne (m. 2000)
- Children: 2
- Father: Peter Maitlis

Emily Maitlis (born 6 September 1970) is a British journalist and former newsreader for the BBC who was the lead anchor of the BBC Two news and current affairs programme Newsnight from 2018 until the end of 2021. Maitlis has since been a presenter of the daily podcast The News Agents on LBC Radio.

In November 2019, Maitlis carried out an hour-long interview with Andrew Mountbatten-Windsor (then Prince Andrew) for the BBC, in which she probed the then-prince's relationship with American convicted sex offender Jeffrey Epstein. The interview was awarded as the Interview of the Year and the Scoop of the Year, and Maitlis won the Network Presenter of the Year award at the RTS Television Journalism Awards in 2020.

== Early life and education ==
Maitlis was born in Hamilton, Ontario, Canada, to British Jewish parents; her paternal grandmother was a Jewish refugee who fled Nazi Germany. She is the daughter of Peter Maitlis, Emeritus Professor of Inorganic Chemistry at the University of Sheffield, and Marion Basco, a psychotherapist from Cambridge. Her mother studied French and Spanish at St Hugh's College, Oxford. In September 1958, her mother began teaching French at Cambridgeshire High School for Girls (since 1974 Long Road Sixth Form College).

Maitlis was brought up on Park Avenue in Sheffield, South Yorkshire, with her two elder sisters, Nicky and Sally. She was educated at King Edward VII School, Sheffield, and read English at Queens' College, Cambridge. At university she took part in The Marlowe Society, in productions such as Doctor Faustus, directed by Clare Venables, with Stuart Crossman, and Dominic Rowan. She gained a 2.1 degree.

== Career ==
=== Broadcasting work in East Asia ===
Maitlis initially wanted to work as a theatre director, prompted by her love of drama, but instead went into radio broadcasting. Before working in the news, she was a documentary maker in Cambodia and China. She worked for the NBC network and was based in Hong Kong. She spent six years in Hong Kong with TVB News and NBC Asia, initially as a business reporter creating documentaries and then as a presenter in Hong Kong covering the collapse of the tiger economies in 1997. She also covered the transfer of sovereignty over Hong Kong with Jon Snow for Channel 4. She moved to Sky News in the UK as a business correspondent and to BBC London News when the programme was relaunched in 2001.

=== BBC ===
During 2005, Maitlis appeared as the question-master on the game show The National Lottery: Come And Have A Go. She was a regular presenter on the BBC News Channel for a decade between 2006 and 2016, alongside Ben Brown and Jon Sopel. She also presented BBC Breakfast and, from May 2006 until July 2007, presented STORYFix on BBC News, a light-hearted look at the week's news set to upbeat music. In July 2007, she was appointed as a contributing editor to The Spectator magazine, an unpaid post. This had been approved by her immediate manager, the head of BBC Television News Peter Horrocks, but the decision was subsequently overturned by his superior, the BBC News director Helen Boaden. In 2012, Maitlis presented the US 2012 election coverage on BBC One and the BBC News Channel alongside David Dimbleby, when incumbent US President Barack Obama and Mitt Romney were fighting for the presidency of the US. In 2016, she presented a news discussion programme called This Week's World on BBC Two, late afternoon on Saturdays.

Maitlis was a leading presenter of Newsnight on BBC Two, alongside Kirsty Wark and Emma Barnett. She joined the programme as a relief presenter in 2006, working her way up to be the lead anchor of the programme following the departure of Evan Davis in 2018. After each show, before bed, she answered emails from viewers. In April 2019, she published Airhead: The Imperfect Art of Making News, a book describing how television news is produced. As of 2019, she was the only Newsnight presenter not to have attended a private school. In that year, Maitlis was among the highest-paid BBC news and current affairs staff, receiving a salary in the range £260,000-£264,999.

In November 2019, Maitlis interviewed Prince Andrew, Duke of York, about his relationship with American sex offender and paedophile Jeffrey Epstein, who had died in August while awaiting trial on sex trafficking charges. The interview was broadcast on the BBC's Newsnight programme on 16 November 2019. Due in part to the fallout from Prince Andrew's disastrous performance during this interview, he resigned from his royal duties. In February 2020, her interview with Prince Andrew won Interview of the Year and Scoop of the Year awards at the 2020 RTS Television Journalism Awards. Maitlis was an executive producer of A Very Royal Scandal (2024), a 3-part drama series about the interview. Also released that year was Scoop, adapted from a book of the same name by Sam McAlister, a former BBC producer.

From 2020, Maitlis presented the BBC podcast, Americast, with Jon Sopel, the BBC's North America editor. The podcasts originally focused on the 2020 election and contained analysis and various interviews from across the political scene. Americast received positive reviews and performed well, becoming one of the UK's most listened-to podcasts of any genre. Maitlis has described her journalism as leading to the closure of the UK's only youth gender identity clinic, the Tavistock Gender Identity Development Service, including a June 2020 Newsnight segment which accused GIDS of granting patients access to medical transition "too quickly" - despite the Care Quality Commission saying that patients often waited up to two years for a first appointment.

==== Censure for partiality ====
In a Newsnight discussion concerning Brexit on 15 July 2019, a viewer alleged that Maitlis had been "sneering and bullying" towards columnist Rod Liddle. Maitlis had accused Liddle of writing columns containing "consistent casual racism week after week" and asked Liddle if he would describe himself as a racist. The BBC Executive Complaints Unit upheld the complaint against her, agreeing that she had been "persistent and personal" in her criticism of Liddle, thus "leaving her open to the charge that she had failed to be even-handed" in the discussion between Brexit-supporting Liddle and his anti-Brexit opponent Tom Baldwin. The Complaints Unit did not find that Maitlis had failed to be even-handed. Conservative commentator Douglas Murray described the segment as "more of a drive-by shooting than an interview".

On 27 May 2020, the BBC said that Maitlis's introduction to Newsnight on the previous night, which had discussed the allegations that the Prime Minister's chief adviser, Dominic Cummings, had contravened lockdown restrictions, "did not meet our standards of due impartiality". The BBC said: "The BBC must uphold the highest standards of due impartiality in its news output. Ms Maitlis started the show by declaring that Mr Cummings had 'broken the rules'." She did not present Newsnight on that day, asking to take the night off. On 3 September 2020, a report by the BBC's Editorial Complaints Unit also ruled against Maitlis in the matter, stating Maitlis's comments "went beyond an attempt to set out the programme agenda" and that the "definitive and at times critical nature of the language" had "placed the presenter closer to one side of the debate" and thus "did not meet the required standards on accuracy or impartiality".

In February 2021, Maitlis was criticised for demonstrating overt partiality after sharing a tweet by Piers Morgan, which condemned the government. Conservative Party politician Andrew Bridgen said the BBC journalist ignored impartiality guidelines. In her August 2022 MacTaggart Lecture at the Edinburgh TV Festival, Maitlis reflected on the incident, claiming that BBC editors were initially supportive. In the lecture, Maitlis expressed disappointment over the promptness with which the BBC apologised. The following day, after receiving numerous complaints from other news outlets, and a specific complaint from the Prime Minister's office, the BBC apologised and removed the segment from its streaming service.

=== The News Agents ===
On 22 February 2022, Maitlis announced her resignation from the BBC after signing with Global, the parent of LBC. She launched a daily podcast and joint radio show again with ex-BBC journalist Jon Sopel. In an address at the 2022 Edinburgh TV Festival, Maitlis cautioned journalists about self-censorship in the name of being reluctant to take on populist critics. The News Agents, a daily podcast from Global Media presented by Maitlis, Jon Sopel, and Lewis Goodall, was launched on 30 August 2022. The opening edition, titled "Trump – Prison or President?", concerned the FBI investigation into Donald Trump's handling of presidential documents, with Anthony Scaramucci, the former White House Director of Communications, appearing as a guest.

=== Other work ===
In May 2023, Maitlis was featured in a two-part Channel 4 documentary called Andrew: The Problem Prince, which explores the events leading up to Prince Andrew's infamous Newsnight interview of 2019. In November 2023, Maitlis was named as an executive producer of A Very Royal Scandal, with Maitlis being played by Ruth Wilson and Michael Sheen as Prince Andrew. Maitlis hosted overnight coverage of both the 2024 United Kingdom general election and the 2024 United States elections for Channel 4 alongside Krishnan Guru-Murthy. In April 2026, Channel 4 commissioned The Epstein Files, an upcoming series presented by Maitlis.

== Personal life ==
In 2000, Maitlis married investment manager Mark Gwynne, who is Catholic and from Waters Upton, Shropshire. They met while working in Hong Kong. She proposed to her husband while on holiday in Mauritius. They have lived in Kensington, London, since 2005 and have two sons, born in 2004 and 2006.

Maitlis is a keen runner, and is also an ambassador for WellChild. She is fluent in French, Spanish and Italian. Maitlis presented the 2012 World Jewish Relief's annual dinner at Guildhall, London. While her parents were Jewish, she has said that she is "not very practising".

=== Being stalked ===
In 2002, it was reported that Maitlis had been stalked for more than a decade by Edward Vines, a former friend from her time at university, who would frequently appear at her place of work. He admitted to harassing Maitlis and was sentenced to four months' imprisonment but was released because of the time he had spent in detention on remand. A restraining order was imposed. In September 2016, Vines was sentenced to three years' imprisonment for breach of the restraining order in respect of Maitlis.

In January 2018, Vines was jailed for three years and nine months for breaching a restraining order forbidding him from contacting Maitlis. He admitted two charges of breaching the restraining order by sending two letters to Maitlis, as well as emails and letters to her mother in 2015. In September 2019, while a prisoner at HM Prison Ranby in Nottinghamshire, he pleaded not guilty to breaching an order restraining him from contacting Maitlis by writing a letter with the intention of having it sent to her. That led to his being sentenced, in February 2020, to a further three years' imprisonment. In July 2022, Vines was convicted of attempting to break a restraining order by writing letters to Maitlis and her mother while in prison, for which he subsequently received an eight-year prison sentence. In a BBC Radio 5 Live interview, Maitlis likened the long-term harassment to having a chronic illness.

== Awards and recognition ==
In 2012, Maitlis received an honorary doctorate from Sheffield Hallam University. She won Broadcast Journalist of the Year at the 2017 London Press Club Awards and the Network Presenter of the Year award at the RTS Television Journalism Awards in 2019 and 2020. She received the German Hanns Joachim Friedrichs Award in 2020.

== Published works ==
- Maitlis, Emily (2019). Airhead: The Imperfect Art of Making News. London: Michael Joseph. ISBN 978-0-241-36285-3. OCLC 1079207867.
