= Relationship of Prince Andrew and Jeffrey Epstein =

British royal scandal

The photograph of Prince Andrew, Virginia Giuffre and Ghislaine Maxwell, March 2001

The relationship of Andrew Mountbatten-Windsor (formerly Prince Andrew, Duke of York) with the American financier and convicted child sex offender Jeffrey Epstein has remained a source of sustained controversy with significant ramifications for the British royal family. According to Andrew, the pair were introduced in 1999 by Epstein's associate Ghislaine Maxwell (who was convicted of child sex crimes in 2021), and socialised in high-profile circles, with Epstein attending events at Windsor Castle and Sandringham House. Maxwell disputes this claim, claiming Sarah Ferguson introduced him to Epstein. Their association came under heightened scrutiny following Epstein's conviction in 2008 for procuring a minor for prostitution. Andrew nevertheless visited him in New York in 2010 after his release from prison.

The controversy intensified with serious allegations from Virginia Giuffre, who claimed she had been trafficked by Epstein and Maxwell and forced to have sexual relations with Andrew on three occasions in the early 2000s, beginning when she was 17. Andrew has consistently and categorically denied the allegations, stating in an interview in 2019 with Newsnight on the BBC that he had no recollection of ever meeting Giuffre. The interview was widely criticised and regarded as damaging to his credibility. The ensuing public backlash and mounting pressure led to Andrew stepping back from public royal duties in November 2019, and in January 2022 his mother, Queen Elizabeth II, removed his military affiliations and his use of the style "His Royal Highness". A civil lawsuit filed by Giuffre in the United States was settled out of court in February 2022 for an undisclosed sum, with Andrew making a payment to Giuffre without any admission of liability. Giuffre died by suicide in April 2025.

In October 2025, amid renewed scrutiny of his association with Epstein following the release of Giuffre's posthumous memoir Nobody's Girl, a formal process to remove Andrew's remaining styles, titles and honours was initiated by his brother King Charles III. Emails released in February 2026 as part of the Epstein files also appear to show that, between 2010 and 2011, Andrew may have shared confidential information with Epstein relating to his official work as trade envoy. Later that month, he was arrested on suspicion of misconduct in public office and released under investigation.

== Background ==
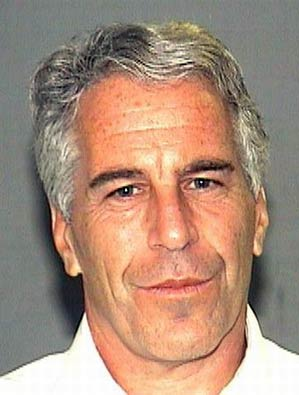
Epstein in 2006

Andrew was a friend of Jeffrey Epstein, an American financier who pleaded guilty in 2008 to soliciting prostitution from someone under the age of 18. Epstein, Ghislaine Maxwell, and Harvey Weinstein (the latter of whom would later also be exposed for sexual misconduct in 2017) had been hosted by Andrew at his residence, Royal Lodge, ahead of a masked ball at Windsor Castle for Princess Beatrice's 18th birthday celebrations in 2006. This was two months after a US arrest warrant had been issued for Epstein for the sexual assault of a minor. Epstein was arrested by police in Florida eight days after the event, though Andrew denied having any knowledge of the arrest warrant issued in the United States. BBC News reported in March 2011 that the friendship was producing "a steady stream of criticism", and there were calls for him to step down from his role as trade envoy. Andrew was also criticised in the media after his former wife, Sarah Ferguson, disclosed that he had helped arrange for Epstein to pay off £15,000 of her debts. Andrew had been photographed in December 2010 walking with Epstein in Central Park during a visit to New York City. In July 2011, Andrew's role as trade envoy was terminated because of escalating controversy over his associations, especially with Epstein.

On 30 December 2014 a court filing in Florida, United States, by the lawyers Bradley J. Edwards and Paul G. Cassell alleged that Andrew was one of several prominent figures, including the lawyer Alan Dershowitz and "a former prime minister", to have participated in sexual activities with a minor later identified as Virginia Giuffre (then known by her maiden name, Virginia Roberts), who was allegedly trafficked by Epstein. An affidavit from Giuffre was included in an earlier lawsuit from 2008 accusing the US Justice Department of violating the Crime Victims' Rights Act during Epstein's first criminal case by not allowing several of his victims to challenge his plea deal; Andrew was otherwise not a party to the lawsuit.

In January 2015 there was renewed media and public pressure for Buckingham Palace to explain Andrew's connection with Epstein. Buckingham Palace stated that "any suggestion of impropriety with underage minors is categorically untrue", and later repeated the denial. Requests from Giuffre's lawyers for a statement from Andrew about the allegations, under oath, were returned unanswered.

=== 2010 visit to New York and subsequent contacts ===
According to emails released by the US Department for Justice, Andrew's trip to New York had been planned months in advance, beginning in April 2010 while Epstein was still under house arrest. After the dates for Andrew's travel had been fixed for 29 November – 7 December, Epstein contacted his publicist asking "young fun people for andrew the week of the 29th?" He also emailed his associates Sultan Ahmed bin Sulayem and Tom Pritzker in an effort to secure business meetings using Andrew's presence as bait. He also booked Andrew in for a skin treatment at a New York spa club and allocated him a car and driver for the week. At the time, the pair were in negotiations to launch their own business together in China, which was to be known as The Witan Group. Email exchanges from May and July 2010 showed Epstein and Andrew heavily discussing business deals. Further emails released showed that during the trip to New York to meet with Epstein, Andrew was a guest at a gathering of celebrities at Epstein's multi-million Manhattan townhouse on 2 December, with fellow guests including Woody Allen and his wife Soon-Yi Previn, TV presenters Katie Couric and George Stephanopoulos, comedian Chelsea Handler and talk show host Charlie Rose. Andrew and Epstein were photographed together on 5 December while taking a walk in Central Park and, despite Andrew's claim in the Newsnight interview that he "never had any contact with him from that day forward", on 6 December Epstein invited a woman over for lunch with Andrew. After Andrew's departure, a female dance student messaged Epstein to state that she had recently "massaged [redacted] and andrew". At the end of August 2019, The New Republic published a September 2013 email exchange between John Brockman and Evgeny Morozov, in which Brockman mentioned seeing a British man nicknamed "Andy" receive a foot massage from two Russian women at Epstein's New York residence during his last visit to the mansion in 2010, and had realised "that the recipient of Irina's foot massage was His Royal Highness, Prince Andrew, the Duke of York".

Further documents showed Andrew had been in contact with Epstein via email on Christmas Day in 2010 to send a "homemade family message". Andrew wrote to Epstein again in February 2011 as he was about to go into his "annual retreat" to thank him for sorting out a problem for his ex-wife over unpaid wages. The Mail on Sunday and The Sun on Sunday published an email from Andrew to Epstein, sent in February 2011 shortly after the photograph of Andrew with Giuffre was made public. In it, Andrew wrote: "We are in this together and will have to rise above it. Otherwise keep in close touch and we'll play some more soon!!!!" The United States House Oversight Committee released further emails that showed Andrew had contacted both Epstein and Maxwell in March 2011, telling the latter "I can't take any more of this" following the allegations published in The Mail on Sunday. In another email, Andrew stated "Please make sure that every statement or legal letter states clearly that I am NOT involved and that I knew and know NOTHING about any of these allegations." Epstein also emailed a journalist to investigate "Andrew's accuser" and stated in a separate email discussing Giuffre "Yes she was on my plane, and yes she had her picture taken with Andrew, as many of my employees have." In February 2026, it emerged that Epstein had been in contact with Andrew's aide, David Stern, from at least 2009 to 2017. In October 2013, Epstein emailed Stern to say: "I have a very beautiful friend comoing [sic] to london on tues. ANdrew [sic] might want to have her for a dinner." In April 2017, Stern emailed Epstein regarding a "super" dinner at Windsor Castle for May that year, asking "who else" he ought to invite.

== Allegations and related developments ==
Giuffre said that she had sex with Andrew on three occasions, including a trip to London in 2001 when she was 17, and later in New York and on Little Saint James in the US Virgin Islands during an orgy. She alleged that Epstein paid her $15,000 after she had sex with Andrew in London. Flight logs show that Andrew and Giuffre were in the places she alleged their meetings took place. Andrew and Giuffre were also photographed together with his arm around her waist, with Epstein's associate Maxwell, in the background, though Andrew's supporters have repeatedly said that the photo is fake and edited. Giuffre stated that she had been pressured to have sex with Andrew and "wouldn't have dared object" as Epstein, through contacts, could have her "killed or abducted". An email sent by "G Maxwell" to Epstein in 2015, released as part of the Epstein files, appears to confirm that a photograph had been taken, reading: "In 2001 I was in London when [redacted] met a number of friends of mine including Prince Andrew. A photograph was taken as I imagine she wanted to show it to friends and family."

In January 2015, in an email exchange with the New York Times reporter Landon Thomas Jr, Epstein said his reputation had "taken a hit" after Giuffre claimed in Florida court filings that she was trafficked for sex with Andrew. Thomas Jr advised Epstein to "separate himself from Andrew" and added "I mean in the end he had consensual sex with VR [Virginia Roberts]. And VR worked for you. The rest is atmospherics. You have moved on!". On 7 April 2015, Judge Kenneth Marra ruled that the "sex allegations made against Andrew in court papers filed in Florida must be struck from the public record". Marra made no ruling as to whether Giuffre's claims were true or false, specifically stating that she may later give evidence when the case came to court. Juan "John" Alessi, who was Epstein's butler, stated in a deposition he gave for Giuffre's 2016 defamation case against Maxwell that Andrew's hitherto unremarked visits to Epstein's house in Palm Beach were more frequent than previously thought. He maintained that Andrew "spent weeks with us" and received "daily massages".

In August 2019, court documents associated with a defamation case between Giuffre and Maxwell revealed that a second girl, Johanna Sjoberg, had given evidence alleging that Andrew had placed his hand on her breast while in Epstein's mansion posing for a photo with his Spitting Image puppet. Later that month, Andrew released a statement saying: "At no stage during the limited time I spent with [Epstein] did I see, witness or suspect any behaviour of the sort that subsequently led to his arrest and conviction", though he expressed regret for meeting him in 2010 after Epstein had already pleaded guilty to sex crimes for the first time.

In July 2020, Caroline Kaufman, an alleged victim of Epstein, said in a federal lawsuit that she had seen Andrew at Epstein's New York mansion in December 2010. In November 2021, Lawrence Visoski, Epstein's pilot, testified in court during Maxwell's trial that Andrew had flown in Epstein's private plane along with other prominent individuals, including Bill Clinton, Donald Trump, and John Glenn. Visoski stated that he had not noticed any sexual activity or wrongdoing on the plane. Similarly, Andrew's name was recorded on 12 May 2001 by Epstein's pilot David Rodgers in his logbook, and he testified that Andrew had flown three times with Epstein and Giuffre in 2001. The following month, a picture of Epstein and Maxwell sitting at a cabin on Queen Elizabeth II's Balmoral estate, around 1999, at the invitation of Andrew, was shown to the jury to establish their status as partners.

On 5 January 2022, Giuffre's former boyfriend, Anthony Figueroa, said on Good Morning Britain that Giuffre had told him Epstein would take her to meet Andrew. He alleged that the meeting had taken place in London. In a court filing, Andrew's lawyers had previously referred to a statement by Figueroa's sister, Crystal Figueroa, who alleged that, in her bid to find victims for Epstein, Giuffre had asked her, "Do you know any girls who are kind of slutty?" The same month, Carolyn Andriano, who as a 14-year-old had been introduced by Giuffre to Maxwell and Epstein and was a prosecution witness in Maxwell's trial, said in an interview with the Daily Mail that then 17-year-old Giuffre had told her in 2001 that she had sex with Andrew. She stated, "And [Giuffre] said, 'I got to sleep with him'. She didn't seem upset about it. She thought it was pretty cool."

In an ITV documentary, a former royal protection officer, Paul Page, who had been convicted and given a six‑year sentence following a £3 million property investment scam in 2009, recounted Maxwell's frequent visits to Buckingham Palace and suggested that the two might have had an intimate relationship, while Lady Victoria Hervey added that Andrew was present at social occasions held by Maxwell. His name and contact numbers for Buckingham Palace, Sunninghill Park, Wood Farm, and Balmoral also appeared in Maxwell and Epstein's 'Little Black Book', a list of contacts of the duo's powerful and famous friends. In February 2022, The Daily Telegraph published a photograph of Andrew with Maxwell giving a tour of Buckingham Palace to his guests Bill Clinton and Kevin Spacey, with a member of the tour party describing Maxwell as "the one who led us into Buckingham Palace".

In October 2022, Maxwell was interviewed by a documentary filmmaker while serving her sentence in prison, and when asked about her relationship with Andrew, she stated that she felt "bad" for him but accepted their "friendship could not survive my conviction. He is paying such a price for the association. I consider him a dear friend. I care about him." She also stated that she now believed the photograph showing her together with Andrew and Giuffre was not "a true image", and added that in an email to her lawyer in 2015 she had been trying to confirm that she recognised her own house, but that the whole image could not be authentic as "the original has never been produced". In another interview from prison, she said the photo was "a fake ... there's never been an original and further there is no photograph. I've only ever seen a photocopy of it." Following these claims, The Mail on Sunday, which first published the photograph in 2011, was contacted by the photographer Michael Thomas, who had taken 39 copies of the image, both front and back. The back of the photo carried a time stamp showing it had been developed on 13 March 2001 – three days after Andrew allegedly engaged in sexual activity with Giuffre – and it had been printed at a one-hour photo lab at Walgreens in Florida, near Giuffre's former home.

Giuffre had said that on the first night she allegedly had sex with Andrew they got into the bath where "he started licking my toes, between my toes, the arches of my feet" before they went into the bedroom and had sex. She repeated this statement in a 2019 BBC interview. She described the bathroom in her unpublished memoir, stating: "It was a beige marble tiled floor with a porcelain Victorian-style bathtub in the middle of the room." In January 2023, Maxwell's brother Ian Maxwell disputed Giuffre's account by releasing photos showing his acquaintances sitting in the bathtub where the incident allegedly took place. The photos had originally been reserved as a defence for Maxwell's legal team if Giuffre were asked to testify. Ian Maxwell said the photos "show conclusively that the bath is too small for any sort of sex frolicking. There is no 'Victorian bath', as Giuffre had claimed, which is proved both by the attached plan of the bathroom and the photos themselves."

In January 2024, a series of documents related to Epstein were released by the United States District Court for the Southern District of New York, including a motion from 2015 by two women which described Andrew having sexual relations with one of them – speculated to be Giuffre – at Maxwell's flat in London, in New York, and on Epstein's private island in the US Virgin Islands "in an orgy with numerous other underaged girls". In a separate document, Maxwell recalled Andrew visiting Epstein's private island only once, adding that there were no girls or women there other than the staff. She also stated that she had "no recollection" as to whether she introduced Andrew to Giuffre. In another unsealed document, Juan Alessi, who worked at Epstein's Palm Beach residence, stated under oath that Andrew "spent weeks with us" and had "daily massages". Another deposition contained references to Johanna Sjoberg's statement that Andrew had groped her breast while she was sitting on his lap. The Metropolitan Police announced that they would not be launching an investigation into the allegations but would assess "new and relevant" information should any come to light.

In a 2025 interview with the US Department of Justice, Maxwell said she had not introduced Andrew to Epstein and described Giuffre's allegations as "rubbish". She further claimed that the photograph showing her with Andrew was "literally a fake". Maxwell stated that she had not been present at the time of the alleged incident and questioned the physical plausibility of the account. Her remarks were published in DOJ transcripts. In September that year, newly released documents turned over by the Epstein estate to the House Oversight Committee revealed that, on 12 May 2000, Andrew travelled with Epstein and Maxwell on a private jet from Teterboro, New Jersey, to West Palm Beach, Florida. He had officially flown on 11 May 2000 from London to New York to attend a reception for the National Society for the Prevention of Cruelty to Children before returning to the UK on 15 May. Between 12 and 15 May 2000, Andrew alongside Sarah Ferguson, visited Peter Nygård's home in Lyford Cay, Bahamas, according to a 25 May 2000 New York Times article about Lyford Cay, which stated that Andrew and Ferguson had visited 2 weeks earlier. In the documents, a client named Andrew also appeared to have received massages in February and May 2000, paid for with $200 cheques.

On 18 October 2025, it was alleged that Andrew had instructed one of his taxpayer-funded personal protection officers to investigate Giuffre – including obtaining her date of birth and US Social Security number – in an apparent attempt to "dig up dirt" on her, shortly before the widely circulated photograph of them together came to light. The Metropolitan Police later announced that they were assessing the alleged misuse of police resources and the claim that Andrew "pressured" the officer to "dig up dirt" on Giuffre, but subsequently confirmed that no further action would be taken, stating that a further assessment had revealed no additional evidence of criminal acts or misconduct.

Giuffre's posthumous memoir, Nobody's Girl, was published in October 2025 and described her alleged encounters with Andrew. In it, she claimed that, in addition to his attempts to avoid being served papers related to her civil case against him, Andrew's team had tried "to hire internet trolls to hassle me". Giuffre stated that her sexual encounter with him on 10 March 2001 was the first of three occasions on which she was forced to have sex with him. On 30 October 2025, upon announcement of the removal of Andrew's titles, Buckingham Palace stated: "These censures are deemed necessary, notwithstanding the fact that he continues to deny the allegations against him. Their Majesties wish to make clear that their thoughts and utmost sympathies have been, and will remain with, the victims and survivors of any and all forms of abuse."

In November 2025, the United States House Oversight Committee requested that Andrew testify to help them identify any of Epstein's co-conspirators and enablers, citing "well-documented allegations against you, along with your long-standing friendship with Mr. Epstein". He did not respond by 20 November deadline. When asked about Andrew, Prime Minister Keir Starmer told reporters that "as a general principle...anybody who has got relevant information" should provide it to investigators.

In December 2025, photos released by the US Justice Department showed Epstein and Maxwell hunting with Andrew at Balmoral and with him in the royal box at Ascot. Another photo showed Andrew reclining across the legs of five people as Maxwell looked down and smiled at him. In January 2026, documents released as part of the Epstein files included photographs that appeared to show Andrew on all fours over a fully clothed woman lying on the floor, with two images depicting him touching her stomach. Further exchanges from August 2010 showed Epstein proposing to introduce him to a 26‑year‑old Russian woman, describing her as "clevere [sic] beautiful, trustworthy", and messages in which Andrew replied that he "would be delighted to see her". In another email exchange from September 2010, Epstein, who was in London with another person, asked for a meeting with Andrew, to which he replied that "we could have dinner at Buckingham Palace and lots of privacy". A further allegation was reported in January 2026 from a second woman who said, through her lawyer, that Epstein had arranged for her to travel to the UK for a sexual encounter with Andrew at Royal Lodge in 2010. On 3 February 2026, the pressure group Republic reported Andrew to the police after alleging that he was involved in trafficking a woman to the UK for sexual exploitation in 2010, citing the Sexual Offences Act 2003.

In February 2026, the BBC reported on a 2011 legal letter contained within the Epstein files. The letter alleged that, in 2006, an unnamed exotic dancer had been hired for $10,000 to perform at Epstein's Florida home for him and Andrew, and that she was subsequently propositioned for a threesome. She stated that she ultimately received only $2,000.

Emails released as part of the Epstein files also appear to show that, between 2010 and 2011, Andrew may have knowingly shared confidential information with Epstein about his official work as trade envoy; trade envoys have a duty of confidentiality over sensitive, commercial, or political information about their official visits. Thames Valley Police subsequently said they were assessing the information. A Buckingham Palace spokesperson stated that the King had expressed "profound concern" about the allegations and would support police if approached. It is further alleged that in 2010, Andrew passed on an email exchange concerning the Royal Bank of Scotland and Aston Martin to Terence Allen and Stern.

In 2011, The Daily Telegraph reported that Epstein's private jet, the "Lolita Express", had once landed at the Royal Air Force station, RAF Marham in Norfolk. It has been alleged that Andrew "pulled strings" so that Epstein could use the RAF base.

== Newsnight interview ==
In November 2019, the BBC's Newsnight arranged an interview between Andrew and the presenter Emily Maitlis in which he recounted his friendship with Epstein for the first time. In the interview, Andrew said he had met Epstein in 1999 through Maxwell; this contradicted comments made by Andrew's private secretary in 2011, who said the two had met in "the early 1990s". Maxwell herself also disputes the claim that she introduced Andrew to Epstein, claiming in an interview with Todd Blanche that "That is a flat untruth.". She also claims that Ferguson was actually the one who introduced him to Epstein. He also said he did not regret his friendship with Epstein, stating: "The people that I met and the opportunities that I was given to learn either by him or because of him were actually very useful".

In the interview, Andrew denied having sex with Giuffre on 10 March 2001, as she had accused, because he had been at home with his daughters after attending a party at a PizzaExpress branch in Woking with his elder daughter, Beatrice. Andrew also added that Giuffre's claims about dancing with him at Tramp while he was sweaty were false due to him temporarily losing the ability to sweat after an "adrenaline overdose" during the Falklands War. According to physicians consulted by The Times, an adrenaline overdose typically causes excessive sweating in humans. He also said that he does not drink, despite Giuffre's account of him providing alcohol for them both. Accounts from other people have supported his statement that he does not drink.

Andrew said he had stayed in Epstein's mansion for three days in 2010, after Epstein's conviction for sex offences against a minor. He said his sole purpose was to end his relationship with Epstein and that the mansion was "a convenient place to stay". He said he would be willing to testify under oath regarding his associations with Epstein. Nonetheless, Andrew was in contact with Epstein on several occasions in 2010, as well as with Jes Staley, as shown by email snippets published in a civil case in 2023. Another series of emails published in court documents from a different civil case showed that in February 2011 Epstein was contacted by a "member of the British Royal Family", believed to be Andrew.

The interview was believed by Maitlis and Newsnight to have been approved by the Queen, although "palace insiders" speaking to The Sunday Telegraph disputed this. One of Andrew's official advisors resigned just prior to the interview being aired. Although Andrew was pleased with the outcome of the interview – reportedly giving Maitlis and the Newsnight team a tour of Buckingham Palace – it received negative reactions from both the media and the public, both in and outside of the UK. The interview was described as a "car crash", "nuclear explosion level bad", and the worst public relations crisis for the royal family since the death of Diana, Princess of Wales. Experts and those with ties to Buckingham Palace said that the interview, its fallout and the abrupt suspension of Andrew's royal duties were unprecedented.

== Lawsuit ==
In August 2021, Giuffre sued Andrew in the federal District Court for the Southern District of New York, accusing him of "sexual assault and intentional infliction of emotional distress". The lawsuit was filed under New York's Child Victims Act, legislation extending the statute of limitations where the plaintiff had been under 18 at the time, 17 in Giuffre's case. On 29 October 2021, Andrew's lawyers filed a response, stating that their client "unequivocally denies Giuffre's false allegations". On 12 January 2022, Judge Kaplan rejected Andrew's attempts to dismiss the case, allowing the sexual abuse lawsuit to proceed. In February, the case was settled out of court, with Andrew making a donation to Giuffre's charity for victims of abuse, without any admission of liability. The amount had not been disclosed as of 2025, but was widely reported to have been £12 million. Criminal proceedings in the United States over Giuffre's claims remained possible.

== Repercussions ==
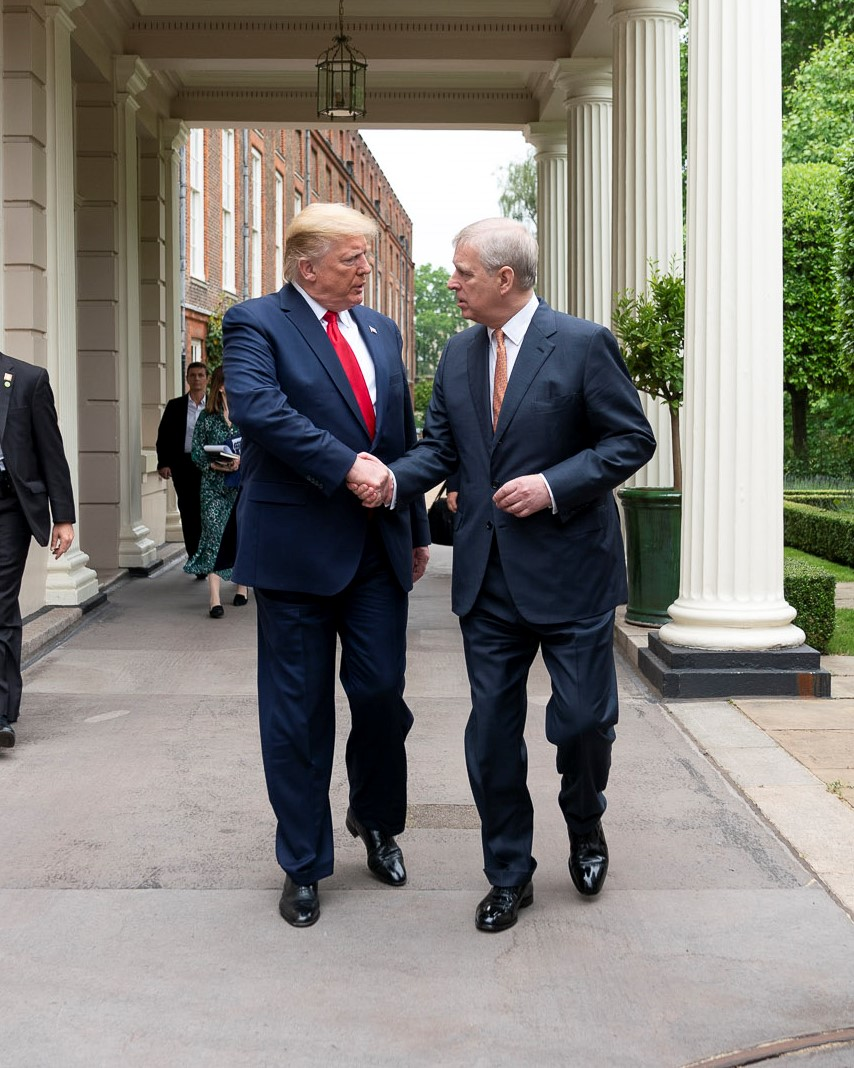
Trump's meeting with Andrew, which Epstein described as "funny", telling Bannon that the latter's accuser had come from Mar-a-Lago. Bannon replied that he was surprised that "nobody is making u the connective tissue".

After US President Donald Trump publicly met Andrew in June 2019, Epstein sent an email to Trump's political strategist Steve Bannon, stating: "Recall prince Andrew accuser came out of Mar-a-Lago. Prince Andrew and Trump today tooo funny." Bannon replied with: "Can't believe nobody is making u the connective tissue". According to Forbes, the accuser in question was likely Giuffre, who had worked at Mar-a-Lago before meeting Epstein through Maxwell. She has publicly accused Andrew, Maxwell, and Epstein of sexual misconduct. In December 2019, Trump claimed not to know Andrew, despite multiple sources and photographic evidence showing they have met on several occasions.

On 20 November 2019, Buckingham Palace announced that Andrew was suspending his public duties "for the foreseeable future". The decision, made with the consent of the Queen, was accompanied by the insistence that Andrew sympathise with Epstein's victims. Other working royals took over his commitments in the short term. On 24 November, the palace confirmed that Andrew was to step down from all 230 of his patronages, although he expressed a wish to have some sort of public role at some future time.

On 16 January 2020, it was reported that the Home Office was recommending "a major downgrade of security" for Andrew, which would put an end to "his round-the-clock armed police protection". On 28 January 2020, the American lawyer Geoffrey Berman stated that Andrew had provided "zero co-operation" with federal prosecutors and the Federal Bureau of Investigation regarding the ongoing investigations, despite his initial promise in the Newsnight interview when he said he was willing to help the authorities. Sources close to Andrew said that he "hasn't been approached" by US authorities and investigators, and his legal team announced that he had offered to be a witness "on at least three occasions" but had been refused by the Department of Justice. The US authorities responded to the claim and denied being approached by Andrew for an interview, and labelled his statements as a way "to falsely portray himself to the public as eager and willing to cooperate". Spencer Kuvin, who represented nine of Epstein's victims, said Andrew could be arrested if he ever returns to the United States.

In March 2020, Andrew hired Mark Gallagher, a crisis-management expert who had helped high-profile clients falsely accused by Operation Midland. In April 2020, it was reported that the Duke of York Young Champions Trophy would not be played any more, after all activities carried out by the Prince Andrew Charitable Trust were stopped. In May 2020, it was announced that Andrew would permanently resign from all public roles over his Epstein ties.

In June 2020, it became known that Andrew is a person of interest in a criminal investigation in the United States, and that US prosecutors had filed a mutual legal assistance request to British authorities, seeking to question Andrew. Following the arrest of Maxwell in July 2020, Andrew cancelled a planned trip to Spain, reportedly due to fears that he might be arrested and extradited to the United States. In the 2019 BBC interview, Andrew told Newsnight his association with Epstein derived from his long-standing friendship with Maxwell, who was later convicted of colluding in Epstein's sexual abuse. At least two trespassing incidents at his Windsor residence were reported in early 2021. In December, he was verbally abused by a woman as he was driving.

=== 2022–2024 ===
In January 2022, Andrew's social media accounts were deleted, his page on the royal family's website was rewritten in the past tense, and his military affiliations and patronages were removed to put an emphasis on his departure from public life. He also stopped using the style His Royal Highness (HRH), though it was not formally removed at the time. In the same month, York Racecourse announced that it would rename the Duke of York Stakes, and Prince Andrew High School in Nova Scotia, which had announced two years earlier that it was considering a name change, stated that it would have a new name at the next academic year; later confirmed as Woodlawn High School. In February 2022, Belfast City Council and the Northern Ireland Assembly decided not to fly a Union Flag for Andrew's birthday. In the same month, the Mid and East Antrim Borough Council announced that they would hold a debate in June 2022 regarding a motion to rename Prince Andrew Way in Carrickfergus. On 27 April 2022, York City Council unanimously voted to remove Andrew's Freedom of the City. Rachael Maskell, Labour MP for York Central, said Andrew was the "first to ever have their freedom removed". In June 2022, Maskell introduced a 'Removal of Titles' private members bill in the House of Commons. The bill would have enabled people considered unworthy to be stripped of aristocratic titles by the monarch or a committee of Parliament.

In March 2022, Andrew made his first official appearance in months, helping the Queen to walk into Westminster Abbey for a memorial service for his father, the Duke of Edinburgh. There was a mixed reaction by commentators to his presence, with some saying that it would send the wrong message to victims of sexual abuse "about how powerful men are able to absolve themselves from their conduct", and others arguing that his appearance was required as "a son, in memory of his father". In June 2022, Andrew took part in private aspects of the Garter Day ceremony, including lunch and investiture of new members, but was excluded from the public procession following an intervention by his brother Charles and his nephew William that banned him from appearing anywhere the public could see him.

Following the death of Queen Elizabeth II on 8 September 2022, Andrew appeared in civilian clothing at various ceremonial events. As he walked behind his mother's coffin in a funeral procession in Edinburgh on 12 September, a 22-year-old man shouted "Andrew, you're a sick old man"; the heckler was arrested and charged with committing a breach of the peace, but the procurator fiscal later dropped charges against the man after an unspecified alternative to prosecution was agreed to. Andrew wore military uniform for a 15-minute vigil by the Queen's coffin at Westminster Hall on 16 September.

In October 2022, it was reported that Andrew no longer received any government funding. The following month, it was reported that he was set to lose his police protection, as he was no longer expected to carry out public duties in accordance with King Charles's wishes. In December 2022, The Telegraph reported that Andrew had written to the Home Office and the Metropolitan Police to complain about the situation. His armed personal protection officers were expected to be replaced by private security guards, likely to be paid for by Charles, at an estimated cost of up to £3 million a year. In January 2023, it was reported that he could no longer use his suite of rooms at Buckingham Palace. In August 2024, The Telegraph reported that King Charles would be withdrawing funds for Andrew's security by the end of October, which would require him to pay for future security operations at his Royal Lodge home.

=== 2025 ===
On 2 November 2025, Defence Secretary John Healey confirmed that Andrew's honorary rank of vice-admiral – retained after he relinquished his other military titles in 2022 – would be removed following direction from Charles III, a process finalised by 13 December. He continues to hold the South Atlantic Medal with rosette, awarded to all who served in the Falklands War. On 3 November, letters patent were issued removing Andrew's style of "Royal Highness" and the title "prince"; without these honorifics, it was agreed that he would use the family surname Mountbatten-Windsor. His appointments to the Royal Victorian Order and Order of the Garter were also rescinded, and his banner was removed from St George's Chapel, Windsor Castle, the chapel of the Order of the Garter. Later that month, Andrew's life membership of the Savage Club was withdrawn, commemorative plaques bearing his name were removed from several locations in the Falkland Islands, and Mid and East Antrim Council agreed to rename Prince Andrew Way in Carrickfergus, County Antrim. On 19 November, Metropolitan Police firearms-licensing officers requested that Andrew voluntarily surrender his firearms and shotgun certificate, which he did.

=== 2026 ===
==== Arrest ====
On 19 February 2026, his 66th birthday, Andrew was arrested by Thames Valley Police on suspicion of misconduct in public office. The arrest followed a call two weeks earlier by the anti‑monarchy campaign group Republic for the force to investigate documents that allegedly indicated misconduct. Shortly after the arrest, King Charles issued a statement saying that "what now follows is the full, fair and proper process" to investigate the allegations. Andrew's homes on the Sandringham estate and at Windsor were also searched. He was released later that day from a Norfolk police station after undergoing 11 hours of questioning, and police searches of his properties have since concluded. Days afterwards, fellow Epstein associate Peter Mandelson was arrested, also on suspicion of misconduct in public office.

In October 2026, it was reported that Andrew had begun legal action against the chief constable of Thames Valley Police and the Central Criminal Court, lodging a judicial review that challenged the warrants obtained before his arrest. On 8 October, Thames Valley Police told the High Court that the warrants used to search his homes had been issued under the wrong legislation, saying they "must be legally quashed".

==== Balmoral Castle investigation ====
In October 2026, Police Scotland were announced to be carrying out active inquiries of activities of Andrew, Jeffrey Epstein and Ghislaine Maxwell at Balmoral Castle.

== See also ==
- Relationship of Donald Trump and Jeffrey Epstein
- Relationship of Bill Clinton and Jeffrey Epstein
- Relationship of Peter Mandelson and Jeffrey Epstein
- Relationship of Mette-Marit, Crown Princess of Norway, and Jeffrey Epstein
- Relationship of Les Wexner and Jeffrey Epstein
- List of people named in the Epstein files
