= Bradley J. Edwards =

American attorney

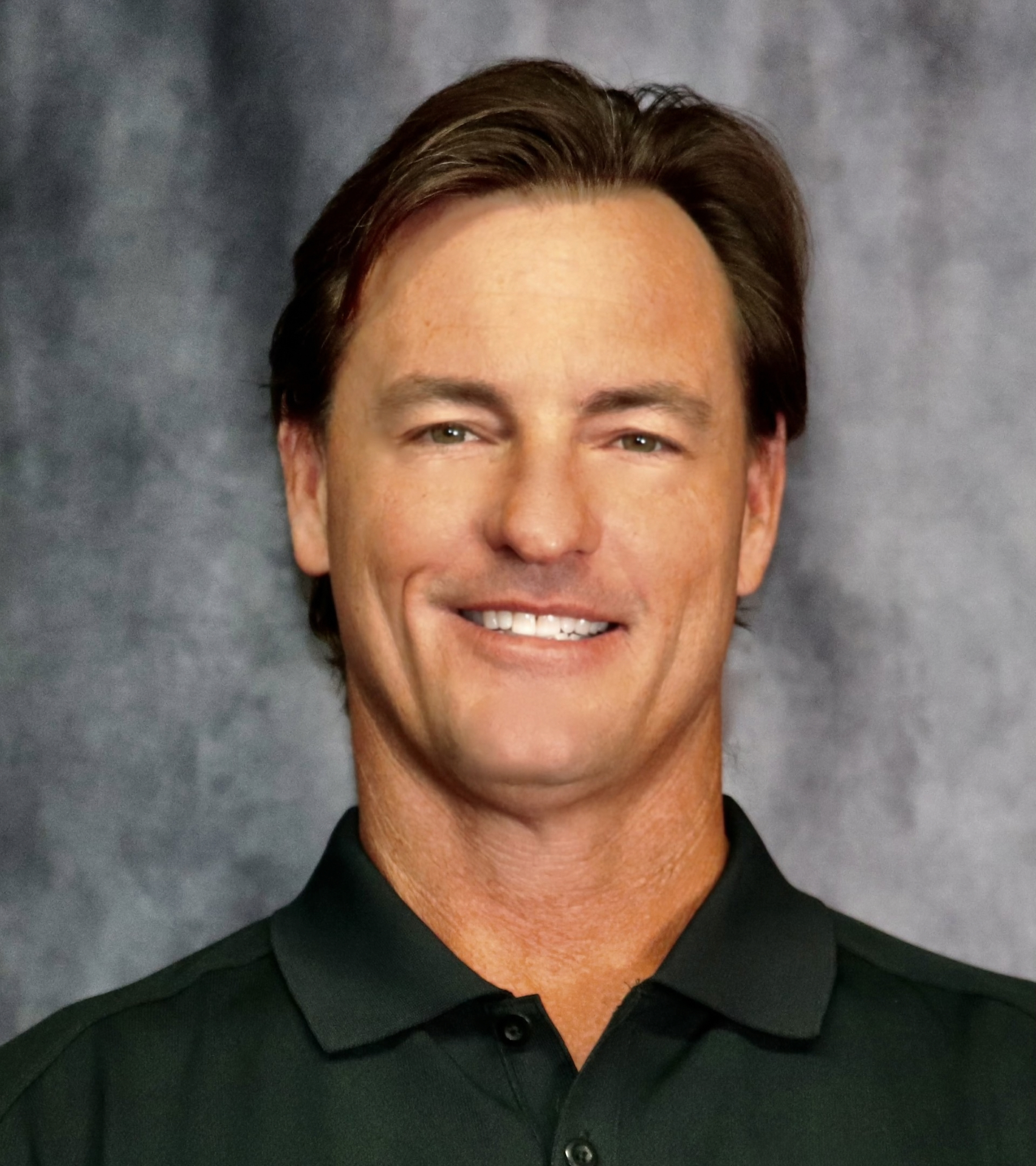
- Edwards in 2025
- Education: University of Florida; Florida State University College of Law
- Occupation: Attorney
- Employer: Edwards Henderson
- Known for: Representing victims of Jeffrey Epstein

Bradley James Edwards is an American attorney. He is best known for representing victims of financier and sex offender Jeffrey Epstein. He is the managing partner at Edwards Henderson, based in Fort Lauderdale, Florida.

== Early career and background ==
He graduated with honors from the University of Florida, where he played collegiate tennis, later attending Florida State University College of Law.

In 2008, he was hired to represent three young women who alleged they were molested by Jeffrey Epstein when they were teenagers. This marked the beginning of what would become a decade-long legal battle against Epstein and the federal prosecutors who granted him a controversial plea agreement.

== Cases involving Jeffrey Epstein ==
In 2008, Edwards filed a lawsuit under the federal Crime Victims' Rights Act (CVRA) on behalf of two victims, identified as Jane Doe No. 1 and Jane Doe No. 2, against the United States government. The lawsuit challenged the secret non-prosecution agreement that then-United States Attorney Alexander Acosta had negotiated with Epstein's legal team, which allowed Epstein to plead guilty to state prostitution charges and serve only 13 months in jail, despite evidence of systematic abuse of dozens of underage girls.

Edwards argued that Acosta and fellow prosecutors violated federal law by granting Epstein and his alleged accomplices immunity without notifying the 36 identified underage victims, as required by the Crime Victims' Rights Act. In February 2019, after more than a decade of litigation, a federal judge ruled that Acosta and his fellow prosecutors had broken federal law by keeping the agreement secret from Epstein's victims.

Edwards represented approximately 20 of Epstein's victims throughout his legal efforts. The CVRA case remained open with pending requests for remedies including financial recompense, written apologies from prosecutors, and the potential overturning of Epstein's plea deal.

=== Malicious prosecution countersuit ===
In response to Edwards' aggressive pursuit of civil cases against him, Epstein filed a lawsuit against Edwards in 2009, accusing him and Scott Rothstein (a former partner at Edwards' firm who was later convicted of running a Ponzi scheme) of civil racketeering and fraud. Epstein alleged that Edwards had fabricated allegations to extort money from him.

Edwards filed a counterclaim for malicious prosecution, asserting that Epstein's lawsuit was designed to intimidate him and his clients, inflict financial burden, and force him to abandon the cases against Epstein. The case was set for trial in December 2018, with at least seven alleged victims expected to testify.

On December 4, 2018, just as jury selection was to begin, Epstein and Edwards reached a settlement. As part of the settlement, Epstein issued a public apology to Edwards, stating:

While Mr. Edwards was representing clients against me, I filed a lawsuit against him in which I made allegations about him that the evidence conclusively proves were absolutely false. The truth was that his aggressive investigation and litigation style was highly effective and therefore troublesome for me. The lawsuit I filed was my unreasonable attempt to damage his business reputation and cause Mr. Edwards to stop pursuing cases against me. It did not work. Despite my efforts, he continued to do an excellent job for his clients and, through his relentless pursuit, held me responsible. I am now admitting that I was wrong and that the things I said to try to harm Mr. Edwards's reputation as a trial lawyer were false. I sincerely apologize for the false and hurtful allegations I made and hope some forgiveness for my acknowledgment of wrongdoing.

— Jeffrey Epstein

Edwards explained that he settled the malicious prosecution case because he wanted his clients' allegations to be heard in federal court regarding Acosta's plea deal, rather than in state court on the topic of malicious prosecution.

In 2021, Edwards was named Attorney of the Year by the Daily Business Review.

=== Litigation involving Alan Dershowitz ===
In sworn statements, one of Epstein's accusers, Virginia Giuffre, alleged that attorney Alan Dershowitz, who was part of Epstein's legal team, had sexually abused her when she was a minor. Dershowitz publicly accused Edwards of unethical conduct and demanded he be disbarred for spreading what Dershowitz characterized as false allegations. This prompted Edwards to sue Dershowitz for defamation, and Dershowitz countersued. They settled in 2016.

Edwards also filed a defamation suit on behalf of Giuffre against Ghislaine Maxwell, a woman Giuffre and others accused of recruiting and trafficking girls for Epstein. Maxwell had accused Giuffre of lying, which Edwards claimed was defamation. They settled in 2017.

In 2023, he led sex trafficking cases against JPMorgan Chase Bank and Deutsche Bank for facilitating Epstein's sex trafficking operations. Edwards, along with Brittany Henderson, David Boies, and Sigrid McCawley, obtained a $290 million settlement from JPMorgan Chase and a $75 million settlement from Deutsche Bank on behalf of the survivors of Jeffrey Epstein in the same year.

== Publication ==
Along with his partner Brittany Henderson, Edwards co-wrote Relentless Pursuit: My Fight for the Victims of Jeffrey Epstein, which was published in 2020.
