= Robin Russell =

Robin Russell may refer to:

- Robin Russell (musician) (1951–2021), American drummer, songwriter, and recording artist
- Robin Russell, 14th Duke of Bedford (1940–2003), British peer, stockbroker and animal conservationist

== See also ==
- Robin Russell-Jones, British medical doctor
