= Kinnerton Street =

Street in Belgravia, London

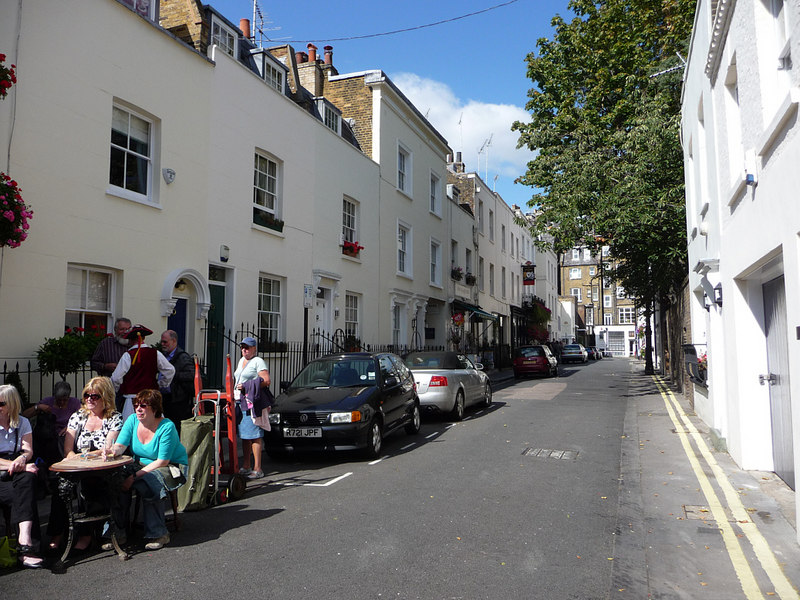

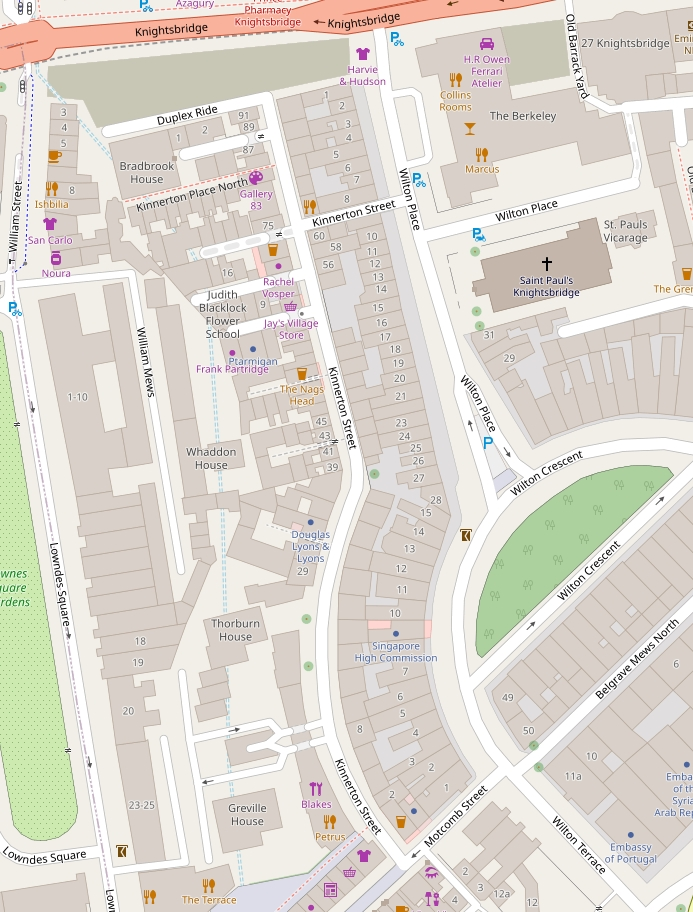
- Area: Belgravia
- Location: City of Westminster, London, England
- Postal code: SW1
- Coordinates: 51.50076°N 0.15670°W

Construction
- Completion: c. early 1800s

Other
- Known for: St George's Hospital medical school

Kinnerton Street is in the district of Belgravia, in the City of Westminster, London, England. It had modest origins as a service street for wealthy areas of the Grosvenor Estate and was originally occupied by the animals, servants, shopkeepers and tradesmen who served their richer neighbours. The small side streets on its west side end at the Ranelagh Sewer which was not covered over until 1844. The street was the site of a medical school where the dissecting was carried out for Gray's Anatomy. Later, the street was gentrified.

== Location ==
The street runs between Duplex Ride in the north and Motcomb Street in the south. It is also joined on its east side to Wilton Place and on its west side by Studio Place, Kinnerton Place, Frederic Mews, and Capeners Close.

== History ==
Kinnerton Street was originally built as a service street for the Grosvenor Estate's Wilton Crescent and Wilton Street. It was named after Lower Kinnerton in Cheshire associated with the Grosvenor family, but swiftly became a slum. The small side streets on its west side end at the Ranelagh Sewer which was not enclosed until 1844. In the mid-nineteenth century its inhabitants were the animals, servants, shopkeepers, and tradesmen who served the wealthy streets adjacent to Kinnerton. It was only gentrified much later.

== Buildings ==
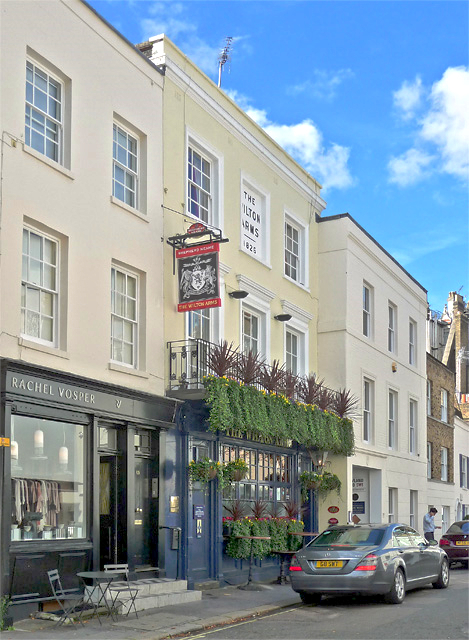
The Wilton Arms, Kinnerton Street

In the mid-1830s Sir Benjamin Brodie provided the capital to purchase a building at the northern end of Kinnerton Street to be the new medical school for the nearby St George's Hospital. Henry Gray probably began his studies of anatomy at Kinnerton Street and carried out the dissecting for Gray's Anatomy there. From 1836, St George's, then based nearby at Hyde Park Corner rented buildings for its School of Anatomy and Medicine. In 1868, the School moved to the main hospital buildings and formally became part of the St. George's Hospital Medical School.

The French restaurant Pétrus has been at number one since March 2010.

The Wilton Arms at no. 71 is a Grade II listed public house, built in 1825–26. The lease is owned by Inda Pubs, and it reopened in September 2021.

Maureen Doherty's shop Egg was at number 36, which was previously a dairy depot.

== Former residents ==
From 1940, Gerald Hamilton, who had served prison sentences for bankruptcy, theft, gross indecency and being a threat to national security, and his jazzband leader lover Ken "Snakehips" Johnson lived at 91 Kinnerton Street.

In the mid-1970s, the journalist and author Christopher Robbins lived with the film director Brian Desmond Hurst in his "grandly shabby Georgian house" called Bradbrook House accessed via Studio Place.

No. 44 was owned by Ghislaine Maxwell, and is where Prince Andrew is alleged to have spent the night with Virginia Giuffre. This is where the photograph of Prince Andrew, Virginia Giuffre and Ghislaine Maxwell was taken.
