= Nobody's Girl (memoir) =

Virginia Giuffre's memoir

Nobody's Girl: A Memoir of Surviving Abuse and Fighting for Justice
- Author: Virginia Roberts Giuffre
- Language: English
- Genre: Memoir
- Publisher: Alfred A. Knopf
- Publication date: 21 October 2025
- Publication place: United States
- Awards: 2026 Book of the Year by the British Book Awards
- ISBN: 9780593493120

Nobody's Girl: A Memoir of Surviving Abuse and Fighting for Justice is a memoir by the American and Australian advocate for survivors of sex trafficking Virginia Roberts Giuffre in which she describes and alleges abuse by Jeffrey Epstein, Ghislaine Maxwell, Andrew Mountbatten-Windsor and other influential men. The memoir was co-written with author Amy Wallace and was published posthumously by Alfred A. Knopf (a division of Penguin Random House) on 21 October 2025, after Giuffre died on 25 April 2025 at age 41. She had expressed an unequivocal wish for the book to be published regardless of her circumstances.

The book was released amid renewed public and media attention about Epstein, prominently his friendship with U.S. President Donald Trump and also his client list, and directly led to Andrew having princely style, titles, and honours removed after years of criticism surrounding his own friendship with Epstein and Giuffre's related accusations against him. As of 10 May 2026, Nobody's Girl had been featured on the New York Times' hardcover nonfiction best-seller list for 24 weeks.

== Background ==
Virginia Giuffre was a key figure in the cases against convicted sex offenders Jeffrey Epstein and Ghislaine Maxwell, as well as Andrew Mountbatten-Windsor (at the time Britain's Prince Andrew) whom she accused of sexual abuse when she was 17. Her decision to speak out publicly was instrumental in bringing their actions to light and bringing about legal consequences for the powerful men involved.

== Summary ==
In the book, Giuffre describes her period working for Donald Trump at Mar-a-Lago, where her father worked, and her grooming by Maxwell and Epstein. She writes of the abuse and of sadomasochistic sexual intercourse Epstein subjected her to. She also describes the three occasions she alleged that she had sex with then-prince Andrew Mountbatten-Windsor. According to Giuffre, Maxwell woke her one day in March 2001 to tell her she was to be like Cinderella that day as she would meet a "handsome prince". According to Giuffre, Mountbatten-Windsor correctly guessed that she was aged 17 on meeting her as she was slightly older than his two daughters. She also alleged that on one occasion of sexual intercourse with Andrew Mountbatten-Windsor, Epstein was involved, and that a second occasion involved eight other young women.

Some of the biggest allegations by Giuffre in Nobody's Girl are those of being raped by a "well-known prime minister", having her first of her three sex encounters with Mountbatten-Windsor on 10 March 2001, an ectopic pregnancy she may have had while being trafficked to many men in July 2001, and her accusation about Epstein and Maxwell attempting to use her as a surrogate mother for their planned baby. Giuffre also talks about her husband, Robert Giuffre, extensively. In the main body of the book, she generally portrays him in a positive light, describing him as a supportive partner and the person who "rescued her from Epstein and Maxwell's clutches". However, this positive portrayal became a point of contention after her death. In the weeks before her suicide in April 2025, Giuffre made public accusations that her husband had physically abused her during their 22-year marriage, and she expressed a desire to revise the book to reflect this. The book's co-author, Amy Wallace, addresses this conflict in a foreword, explaining the situation and the reasons why Giuffre might have initially chosen to remain silent about the domestic abuse in the manuscript itself. The published book therefore contains her original, more loving descriptions of her husband, alongside the foreword and other editorial notes that acknowledge the later abuse allegations.

== Awards ==
Nobody's Girl received the 2026 Book of the Year award from the British Book Awards. Giuffre was also awarded the British Book Awards prize for Nonfiction: Narrative Book of the Year, as well as the Freedom to Publish Award, which she shared with Sarah Wynn-Williams, author of Careless People: A Cautionary Tale of Power, Greed, and Lost Idealism. Speaking at the award ceremony, Wynn-Williams expressed that Giuffre had faced "coordinated suppression efforts, intimidation and litigation" and said that "Virginia understood who silence protected and realised that only truth can protect everyone else."

== See also ==
- Photograph of Prince Andrew, Virginia Giuffre and Ghislaine Maxwell – 2001 photo taken by Jeffrey Epstein
