= St George's House (Windsor Castle) =

British organisation founded in 1966

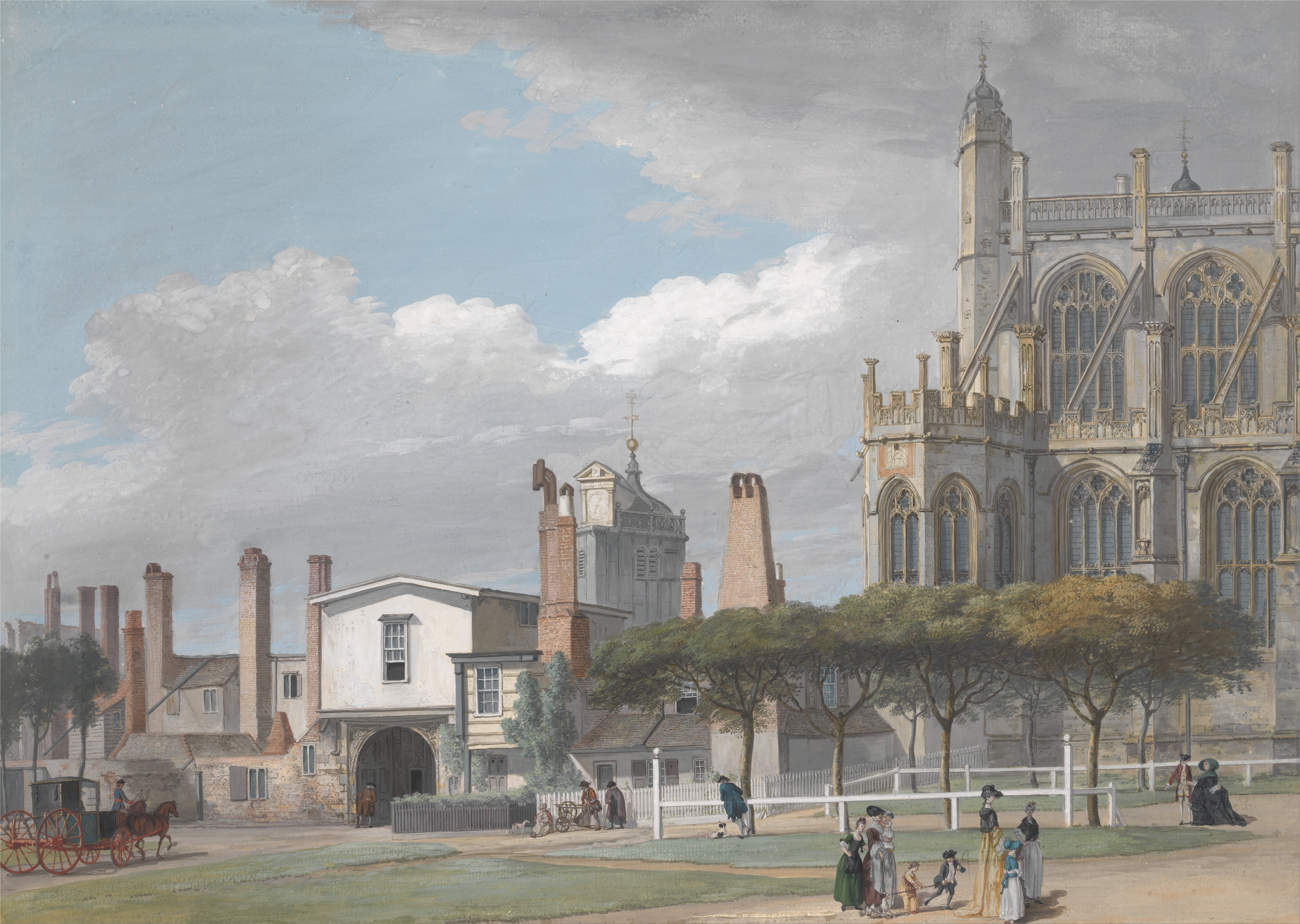
- St George's Chapel, Windsor Castle, and entrance to Cloister
- Formation: 1966; 60 years ago
- Headquarters: Windsor, United Kingdom
- Coordinates: 51°29′02″N 0°36′24″W
- Members: ~ Dean and Canons of Windsor; ~ Knights of the Most Noble Order of the Garter; - 10 Members
- Dean of Windsor: Christopher Cocksworth
- Website: www.stgeorgeshouse.org
- Remarks: Mission: effecting change for the better by nurturing wisdom through dialogue

St George's House, based in the grounds of Windsor Castle, is a British organisation committed to "effecting change for the better by nurturing wisdom through dialogue".

Founded in 1966 by Prince Philip, Duke of Edinburgh and Robin Woods, the then Dean of Windsor, it brings together people of business, government, society and the church to consult on contemporary issues of moment.

From 2016 to 2022 David Stern was a director of the organisation who communicated with and was the "go-between" for Jeffrey Epstein on behalf of Andrew Mountbatten-Windsor, before he was stripped of his titles.

== Name and mission ==
St George's House, the organisation, takes its name from the building of that name in close proximity to and associated with St George's Chapel within the perimeter of the Castle. It belongs to the College of Canons, founded in 1348 and is where participants are hosted for the duration of consultations on given topics. The organisation brings together thinkers from different disciplines and roles in British society with the purpose of investigating means of overcoming some of the major challenges in contemporary society through dialogue.

=== Association with Shakespeare ===
The Vicars' Hall is part of the premises used for consultations. Shakespeare's The Merry Wives of Windsor is claimed to have received its first ever performance in the Vicars' Hall, (built in 1415) in front of Queen Elizabeth I, in 1597, for the festival of the Order of the Garter, though specific evidence for this seems lacking.

== Council of St George's House ==
The Council of St George's House comprises the Representative Knights of the Most Noble Order of the Garter, Dean and Canons of Windsor and other members.

=== Representative Knights of the Most Noble Order of the Garter ===
- Anne, Princess Royal
- James Hamilton, 5th Duke of Abercorn

=== The Dean and Canons of Windsor ===
- Canon Hueston Finlay
- Canon Martin Poll
- Canon Mark Powell

=== Members ===
- Tessa Blackstone, Baroness Blackstone
- Donald Curry, Baron Curry of Kirkharle
- David Darsch
- Katie Ghose
- Christopher Jamison
- Lt Gen Phil Jones
- Dame Mary Marsh
- John Newbegin
- Lindsay Northover, Baroness Northover
- Maeve Sherlock, Baroness Sherlock
- Dame Caroline Spelman
- Graham Usher, Bishop of Norwich
- William Waldegrave, Baron Waldegrave of North Hill

== Events ==
=== Consultations ===
St George's House hosts around 60 events for leaders from across society each year. Previous consultations have taken place with Help Rescue The Planet (2012), the Airey Neave Trust on countering violent extremism (2014), and with the Corsham Institute and RAND Europe (2016).

=== St George's House Lectures ===
==== The Annual Lecture ====
The Annual Lecture was established in 1978 and is sponsored by the mining company Rio Tinto. The first lecture was given by Kingman Brewster Jr., then ambassador of the US in London. The 2016 Lecture was given by Rowan Williams, former Archbishop of Canterbury.

==== The Elson Ethics Lecture ====
The Elson Ethics Lecture is supported by ambassador Edward Elston to promote discussion and debate on issues of an ethical and moral nature. The 2016 Elson Ethics Lecture was given by the Baroness Eliza Manningham-Buller, former Director-General of MI5, the Security Service.

== Society of Leadership Fellows ==
The Society of Leadership Fellows was established in 2016 to recognise the 50th anniversary of the founding of St George's House

== In popular media ==
St George's House, the Dean of Windsor, and Prince Philip are prominently featured, albeit in a fictionalized series of events, in the seventh episode of the third series of the Netflix series The Crown, "Moondust".
