= Hueston Finlay =

Irish Anglican priest and academic

The Reverend Canon Doctor Hueston Edward Finlay
- Dean of King's College, Cambridge
- In office: 26 January 2026 - present
- Predecessor: Stephen Cherry

Orders
- Ordination: Deacon (1989); Priest (1990)

Personal details
- Born: Portlaoise
- Denomination: Anglicanism
- Education: Open University; King's College, London; Trinity College, Dublin

Hueston Finlay is an Irish Anglican priest and academic, specialising in systematic theology. Since January 2026, he serves as the Dean of King's College, Cambridge. He is also an Honorary Research Fellow at the University of Aberdeen.

Previously, he was Dean of Magdalene College Cambridge and subsequently Vice-Dean of St George's Chapel, Windsor Castle (2004–2025) and Warden of St George's House (2008–2025).

== Early life and education ==
Finlay was born and brought up in Portlaoise.

Finlay was educated at Wesley College Dublin and began his further education at Trinity College, Dublin, graduating with an Engineering degree (B.A.; B.A.I.) in 1985. His theological studies began with a Bachelor of Theology (BTh) degree in 1989 - also at Trinity College - followed by a Doctor of Philosophy (PhD) at King's College, London in 1998.

Most recently Finlay read Pure Mathematics through the Open University, graduating with a Master of Science (MSc) in 2016.

In the field of theology Finlay studies Schleiermacher and Barth with particular reference to the former. He is interested in Barth as a natural inheritor of Schleiermacher, rather than a direct opponent. He is also interested in the relationship between theology and other disciplines, especially the fields of mathematics, music, and literature.

== Ecclesiastical career ==
Finlay has held roles in Kilkenny, Cambridge and Windsor.

- Curate, St Canice's Cathedral, Kilkenny (1989–1992) - bishop's vicar, diocesan librarian and registrar, teaching theology and lecturing on ethics and doctrine for the diocesan adult education program.
- Curate, University Church, Cambridge and Chaplain, Girton College, Cambridge (1992–1995).
- Dean of Chapel and Director of Studies in Theology, Magdalene College, Cambridge (1995–2004).
- Canon (2004–2025) and Vice-Dean (2014–2025), St George's Chapel, Windsor Castle.
- Warden, St George's House (2008–2025).

== Selected works ==
- ‘Feeling of absolute dependence’ or ‘absolute feeling of dependence’? A question revisited (2005).
