= Giuffre v. Prince Andrew =

2021 US federal civil lawsuit

- Court: United States District Court for the Southern District of New York
- Full case name: Virginia L. Giuffre vs. Prince Andrew, Duke of York, a/k/a Andrew Albert Christian Edward, in his personal capacity
- Docket nos.: 1:21-cv-06702

Court membership
- Judge sitting: Lewis A. Kaplan

Giuffre v. Prince Andrew was a lawsuit filed in U.S. federal court in which Virginia Giuffre (née Roberts) sued Prince Andrew, Duke of York (now Andrew Mountbatten-Windsor), second son of Queen Elizabeth II, for sexual assault. Giuffre's lawsuit, filed under New York's Child Victims Act, alleged that she was forced to have several sexual encounters with Andrew in the early 2000s at the age of 17, after being sex trafficked by the American financier and convicted sex offender Jeffrey Epstein. Andrew denied Giuffre's claims. The lawsuit was filed in August 2021 in the U.S. District Court for the Southern District of New York, and was assigned to senior U.S. district judge Lewis A. Kaplan.

Giuffre and Andrew reached an out-of-court settlement in February 2022, and the case was dismissed by the parties' stipulation in March 2022 without going to trial.

== Background ==
In 2014, Virginia Giuffre alleged that, as a 17-year-old, she was sex trafficked to Andrew by convicted sex offenders Jeffrey Epstein and Ghislaine Maxwell. Andrew denied any wrongdoing. Following criticism for his association with Epstein and Maxwell, Andrew resigned from public roles in May 2020.

== Case ==
=== Filing and serving ===
In August 2021, Giuffre sued Andrew in the United States District Court for the Southern District of New York, accusing him of "sexual assault and intentional infliction of emotional distress". Giuffre's lawyers alleged Andrew caused her "emotional distress" which was "severe and lasting". The lawsuit sought unspecified damages, and was filed under New York's Child Victims Act, which provided a new opportunity for victims and claimants to pursue claims in cases that were either time-barred or had passed the statute of limitations.

An affidavit filed by Giuffre's lawyers with the US court stated that paperwork for Giuffre's lawsuit had been left with an office of the Metropolitan Police at Andrew's home at Royal Lodge, Windsor, on August 27, 2021. Andrew's legal team denied documents were legally served. The High Court of England and Wales agreed to act, if needed, to serve court documents on Andrew. The Hague Service Convention, a treaty that governs requests between countries for evidence in civil or commercial matters, allows Giuffre's legal team to ask the High Court to formally notify the prince about her civil action.

Lewis A. Kaplan, a New York federal judge, ruled that legal documents over the sexual assault case that Giuffre filed may be served to Andrew through his Los Angeles-based lawyers. The ruling came after Andrew was accused by Giuffre's lawyers of actively trying to evade service of legal documents. On September 21, 2021, lawyers for Giuffre stated in a filing that the papers had been served to and received by Andrew's attorney Andrew Brettler in Los Angeles via email and FedEx the day before, giving the Duke an extended time to file a response to a New York court by October 29, 2021 or face a default judgment. In late September 2021, it was reported that a clubber – who had claimed she had seen the Duke with Giuffre at Tramp nightclub in central London – had given a written statement to the FBI and would testify against him, though she stated she could "remember the year" but not "the exact date". Also in September 2021, it was reported that Queen Elizabeth II would use her income from the Duchy of Lancaster private estate to pay for her son's defence case, however, it was reported in the following months that she would not do so and the Duke was planning to use money from the sale of his Swiss chalet. On October 10, 2021, the Metropolitan Police announced that they had completed their review into documents related to the allegations and, after questioning Giuffre, had decided to drop their investigation. Despite this, US authorities may still prosecute Andrew and he may still be liable for extradition.

=== Attempts to have the case dismissed ===
On October 29, 2021, Andrew's lawyers filed a response, stating that their client "unequivocally denies Giuffre's false allegations". They accused Giuffre of profiting from her claims "at [Andrew's] expense and at the expense of those closest to him", and asked a US judge to dismiss the lawsuit according to a sealed settlement reached between Epstein and Giuffre in 2009 which could absolve Epstein, Andrew and numerous other people "from any and all liability". In October 2021, lawyers representing Andrew petitioned a New York judge to keep the 2009 legal arrangement between Giuffre and Epstein sealed. In December 2021, US district judge Loretta Preska said unless Epstein's estate made valid objection, the document should be published.

In late December 2021, Andrew's lawyer tried to get the case thrown out, arguing that Giuffre was resident in Australia rather than the United States. Giuffre's lawyers insisted she lives in Colorado, where her mother also lives, and pointed out she is registered to vote there. In a court filing, Giuffre's lawyers accused Prince Andrew's lawyers of trying to halt her lawsuit in a "transparent attempt to delay discovery into his own documents and testimony". Judge Kaplan rejected the claim that Giuffre no longer lives in the United States. Judge Kaplan noted Andrew's lawyers asked for vast numbers of documents from Giuffre's team including evidence where she has lived. In the same month, Andrew's lawyers filed another motion to dismiss the case, arguing that Giuffre was the age of consent at the time—which is 17 for New York—and describing her account on consenting as "highly subjective". On December 29, 2021, Ghislaine Maxwell's conviction enabled Giuffre's lawyers to maintain, in her case against Prince Andrew, that it is beyond reasonable doubt Maxwell helped Epstein's abuse.

The 2009 settlement between Giuffre and Epstein was published on January 3, 2022 and shows that Giuffre had received $500,000 (£371,000) in her lawsuit against Epstein; the settlement states that upon receipt of the sum, Giuffre agreed to

remise, release, acquit, satisfy and forever discharge the said second parties and any other person or entity who could have been included as a potential defendant ... from all, and all manner of, action and actions of Virginia Roberts [Giuffre's maiden name], including state or federal, cause and causes of action.

The legal term in the 2009 settlement is "with prejudice."

Giuffre's legal team argued that the terms of the settlement were irrelevant to her case against Andrew. On January 4, 2022 lawyers for both sides argued in court whether the case should go ahead. During the hearing, Judge Kaplan said "The use of the word 'potential' is the use of a word to which neither you nor I can find any meaning at all", adding that only Epstein himself would have been able to explain his view on the meaning of "potential defendants" mentioned in his settlement with Giuffre. On January 12 Judge Kaplan rejected Andrew's attempts to dismiss the case, allowing the sexual abuse lawsuit to proceed.

=== Discovery phase ===
Each side was expected to take between 8 and 12 depositions during the discovery phase. Judge Kaplan had previously announced that depositions – out-of-court testimony – for the case needed to be submitted by July 14, 2022. Andrew and Giuffre were both expected to make statements and face cross-examination under oath. The Duke was set to give evidence under oath in a two-day deposition conducted by Giuffre's lawyers, David Boies and Sigrid McCawley, beginning on March 10, 2022 in London. Other members of the royal family and police protection could have been asked to give legal evidence. Giuffre's lawyers had asked Andrew to give medical evidence that he cannot sweat and of his trip to a PizzaExpress in Woking, following his statements to that effect in his 2019 Newsnight interview. Her lawyers reportedly claimed up to six witnesses who linked Andrew to Giuffre. David Boies, Giuffre's lawyer, maintained there was a good chance of the case going to trial.

On January 14 Giuffre's lawyer David Boies requested to interview two people in the UK, and submitted a petition asking Judge Lewis Kaplan to request assistance from British authorities. Boies had already suggested he might question Sarah, Duchess of York and their daughters Princesses Beatrice and Eugenie. He sought witness testimony from the Duke's former assistant Robert Olney, and Shukri Walker who had claimed she had seen the Duke with Giuffre at Tramp nightclub in central London. On January 15 Sky News reported that Andrew's lawyers wanted to interview Giuffre's husband and her psychologist Dr. Judith Lightfoot after Andrew said that she "may suffer from false memories". Prince Andrew was accused by legal academics of "victim blaming" and "gaslighting" after his lawyers requested Virginia Giuffre's mental health records.

On January 26 Andrew's lawyers submitted a lengthy response to the allegations, in which they set out 12 defences and demanded a trial by jury. On February 1 Judge Kaplan asked for help from British and Australian authorities to get witness statements from residents in their nations. Later that month, Andrew's lawyers requested access to the original photograph from March 2001, which showed Andrew and Giuffre together with his arm round her waist. It was reported that the photograph was no longer in Giuffre's possession and at one stage she reportedly had given the original to the FBI in 2011.

=== Settlement ===
On February 15, 2022, it was announced in a joint statement that both parties had reached an out-of-court settlement, which included Andrew making a substantial donation to Giuffre's charity. Giuffre's lawyer David Boies said that the settlement "does not in any way insulate him from any criminal liability that would otherwise exist", and that Giuffre did not sign a non-disclosure agreement (NDA). A number of reports suggested that there must be an NDA, though it could only be in place until after the Queen's Platinum Jubilee. It later reported that both parties had signed an agreement to remain silent about the case and financial deal during the Queen's Platinum Jubilee, but the gagging clause reportedly expired in February 2023, meaning that Giuffre could have started talking about the alleged abuse. The specific terms of the agreement are not known.

The settlement placed a gagging order on Andrew: he could no longer deny he had raped Giuffre or repeat the claim that he had no memory of meeting her.

Even though the amount of money set to be given by Andrew to Giuffre has not been officially disclosed, The Daily Telegraph estimated that it could be as high as £12 million ($16.3 million), with the Queen partly funding it by giving £2 million to Giuffre's sex trafficking charity. The Prince of Wales – now King Charles III – was reported to have agreed to lending the bulk of money to Andrew, which he was required to pay back after selling his Swiss chalet. Failure in paying back the loan would result in a deduction from his share of inheritance from the Queen. On March 8, 2022, the BBC reported that the settlement had been paid but the amount remained undisclosed and it was still not clear how Andrew paid it. It was noted in the stipulation of dismissal that each party would "bear her/his own costs and fees". In 2026, media outlets reported the Queen and Prince Philip had loaned Andrew £7 million and £3 million respectively to cover the settlement, with Charles lending him £1.5 million - which the king denied - and Andrew had not repaid any of the money. Repayment money was to have come from the sale of Andrews' £19 million chalet in Verbier, but its sale made little money as it was heavily mortgaged.

Graham Smith, of the anti-monarchy group Republic, said "taxpayers deserve to know where the money for the settlement is coming from." Labour MP Andy McDonald announced plans to raise in parliament the issue of how the settlement will be funded, asking for reassurance that public money would not be used to pay for the settlement. In an interview with the BBC, Boris Johnson refused to say if public money would be used to pay the settlement and parliamentary conventions make it difficult for parliament to discuss royalty. In response to a Freedom of Information request, the Treasury stated that "No public money has been used to pay legal or settlement fees".
