= David Stern (German businessman) =

German-French businessman

David Stern (born January 1978) is a German-French businessman. He was an aide to Andrew Mountbatten-Windsor (formerly Prince Andrew, Duke of York) and frequently communicated with child sex offender Jeffrey Epstein.

Stern is believed to be living in the United Arab Emirates as of 2026.

== Early life and career ==
Stern was born in Germany and is a German-French dual national. According to a person familiar with the matter, Stern studied law at SOAS University of London.

== Career ==
Stern founded Asia Gateway (later Witan Group) in 2002, with offices in Beijing and London. Stern claims to have sold a majority stake in the company to Informa in 2010; Informa confirmed that it bought the stake, but said no product ever came to market, and the agreement expired in 2014.

According to a biography Stern apparently sent to Jeffrey Epstein, he worked for investment banking firm, Ermgassen & Co, from 2000 to 2002. A curriculum vitae that he used to solicit investors for a fund in the United Kingdom in 2008 has since been deemed falsified. In it, he stated that he had initially worked at Deutsche Bank and then at Siemens – both companies confirmed that they had never employed Stern.

Stern was appointed to the University of Cambridge Judge Business School (JBS) advisory board in 2018. He resigned from the board over his links to Epstein and Mountbatten-Windsor in February 2026 after the release of documents disclosed by the US justice department (Epstein files). Stern was the only member of the board with no picture or profile page on the website.

== Relationships ==
=== Jeffrey Epstein ===
Stern's correspondence with Jeffrey Epstein are reported to have begun around 2008 and lasted until 2019. In October 2016, Stern emailed Epstein to suggest that they should buy Deutsche Bank and that the bank's largest shareholder, the Monarchy of Qatar could be "aligned via PA" [Prince Andrew].

Stern had previously pitched Chinese business related deals to Epstein. Stern tried to help Epstein secure a travel visa for China in 2012 but Epstein was denied the visa due to his criminal record. Stern told Epstein in a 2011 email that "For the African investment vehicle we can be the bridge between the Chinese and African side: both get what they want with maximum protection/distance (ie no direct Chinese involvement) through us as intermediary. It can be a deal machine once Chinese capital gets involved. It would fit in perfectly with the other plan of managing Chinese wealth".

Stern encouraged Epstein to buy Dukes Hotel in London's St James's district in 2010. The hotel was owned by Sultan Ahmed bin Sulayem, chairman and CEO of the Dubai-owned DP World, a logistics company which controls ports all over the world. Epstein introduced Stern to Peter Mandelson and asked him to call Mandelson in April 2011. Epstein wrote in an email that he would ask Steve Bannon if could meet Stern in London in July 2018.

Emails published in the Epstein files showed that Stern and Epstein frequently discussed women using derogatory terms, and exchanged photographs of Mountbatten-Windsor with women while he was the United Kingdom's Special Representative for International Trade and Investment (UKTI). Specifically Stern used "P factor" with P inferring to "Pussy". Stern wished Epstein "lots of P" on his birthday and New Year's Day of 2013, "to review Chinese P", rating cities and events on a P rating out of 10.

=== Andrew Mountbatten-Windsor ===
Stern was formerly an aide to Andrew Mountbatten-Windsor (formerly Prince Andrew, Duke of York) and was a director of Andrew's Pitch@Palace entrepreneurial initiative. He resigned as a director of Pitch@Palace in 2019. Stern asked Evelyn de Rothschild if he wanted to sponsor Pitch@Palace in 2015 telling him that it was "quite cool and draws a good crowd". Stern sat next to Queen Elizabeth II at a Pitch@Palace event at St James's Palace in 2016. Stern had been introduced to Andrew by Epstein. He emailed Epstein in 2010 to say that he was at Andrew's "birthday party" and wrote about celebrities he had met there. In 2014 Stern emailed Epstein to say that "PA [Prince Andrew] sends his birthday wishes and love" with a photograph of him and Andrew and Sarah Ferguson (then Duchess of York). Epstein introduced Sarah Ferguson to Stern and he subsequent dined at the Royal Lodge in Windsor Great Park, the home of Andrew and Sarah.

In 2010, Andrew apparently passed on an email conversation about the Royal Bank of Scotland and Aston Martin to Stern, who allegedly passed it on to Epstein. Stern was in contact with Epstein from at least 2009 to 2017. In October 2013, Epstein emailed Stern to say: "I have a very beautiful friend comoing [sic] to london on tues. ANdrew [sic] might want to have her for a dinner." Prince Andrew was often referred to as 'PA' by the pair. In April 2017, Stern emailed Epstein regarding a "super" dinner at Windsor Castle for May that year, asking "who else" he ought to invite. On the same day Epstein then emailed a business associate to ask "I know you hate london do [sic] want a dinner invite at windsor castle with the top Chinese. biz people? may 26". BBC News reported that the exchange seemed that Epstein had "the power to directly invite" people to dinner at Windsor Castle.

Stern was a director of the St George's House Trust organisation at Windsor Castle from 2016 to 2022. Epstein, who had pleaded guilty in 2008 to soliciting prostitution sex from underage girls. Stern remained on the board of St George’s House even until 2022, three years after Epstein’s death in prison. He communicated with Jeffrey Epstein on behalf of Andrew when he was Duke of York. BBC News described Stern's role as a "go-between" for Epstein and Andrew after the relationship between the pair experienced public scrutiny after Epstein's 2008 conviction. BBC News described Stern as a "trusted royal insider" and an "enigmatic figure with little online presence". Writing in The Guardian, Daniel Boffey described Stern as Epstein's "man in the palace – seemingly looking for business opportunities, passing messages and directing Mountbatten-Windsor on the financier's command".

In 2010 Stern wrote of establishing a "small investment highly private office in London with outpost in Beijing, for high net worth individuals – targeting Chinese but not exclusively that works like an extended family office" and that he and Epstein could "very discreetly make [Mountbatten-Windsor] part of it and use his 'aura and access', you take/decide on the investments and I manage the day to day operations". Andrew had also suggested that Stern could be "a Ghost for me in the up side of this entity". In 2011 Stern formed the company Witan. On a trip with Andrew to China and Kuala Lumpur Stern wrote that most meetings were organised by him and that he would "stay in the background/hidden, just make the arrangements". Stern told Epstein that Andrew was in California's Silicon Valley and asked Epstein who he should meet. Epstein suggested Andrew meet Steve Sinofsky. Stern asked Epstein about Jes Staley in November 2015, with Epstein replying that Andrew should invite him to Buckingham Palace.

Stern tried to set up a meeting between Epstein and Libyan head of state Muammar Gaddafi.

=== Sarah Ferguson ===
In September 2009 Stern wrote that Sarah wanted him to accompany her to a meeting with the Russian-born businessman Vladimir Zemtsov who was "willing to evaluate" paying off her debts. Stern told Epstein in 2010 that Andrew had asked him to "see a guy who has access to Nigeria oil and when selling it to China (or somebody else)" and that Sarah could make around $6 million. Stern wrote that the plan "seems very fishy". In 2011 after Ferguson had said that she deeply regretted her involvement with Epstein and that she "abhorr[ed] paedophilia and any sexual abuse of children and know that this was a gigantic error of judgment on my behalf". Stern wrote to Epstein to say "Is she going crazy ??? When can I call you ?". Stern subsequently wrote to Epstein that the "Rest of the day has become more quiet and restrained. Theme seems to be now: PA [Prince Andrew] under scrutiny for dealing with Azerbaijan and Turkmenistan (but government approved!), he has full support of his Mum [Queen Elizabeth], only dealing with you [Epstein] was "unwise"". Stern discussed Ferguson's potential personal bankruptcy in a 2009 email chain.

== See also ==
- Relationship of Andrew Mountbatten-Windsor and Jeffrey Epstein
