= Campaign for Lead Free Air =

UK advocacy group

CLEAR, the Campaign for Lead Free Air, was started in 1981 when a wealthy property developer, Godfrey Bradman, recruited the veteran campaigner and former Director of Shelter, Des Wilson, to get lead-free petrol into the United Kingdom. Wilson ran the public campaign and co-opted Robin Russell-Jones as the unpaid medical and scientific advisor.

In April 1983, the Royal Commission on Environmental Pollution (RCEP) published a report that confirmed the dangers of lead to children's health, and recommended that lead should not be added to petrol. Within half an hour of the RCEP report being published, the Environment Secretary, Tom King, announced that the government would support the introduction of unleaded petrol, that oil companies would have to provide it on forecourts, and that car manufacturers would have to make engines that could use it.

Shortly after, Wilson resigned from CLEAR to become Chairman of Friends of the Earth. From 1984 to 1989 Russell-Jones became Chair of CLEAR whom he represented on the Government committee, Working Party on Lead in Petrol (WOPLIP).

Having achieved its objectives, CLEAR was officially closed down in 1989. Due to the campaign's significance, the Wellcome Library, one of the world's major resources for the study of medical history, holds a collection of CLEAR's archives.

CLEAR is regarded as a textbook example of how to run and win an environmental campaign. Although the services of Wilson, who was considered an experienced and charismatic campaigner, were crucial to the success of CLEAR, it likely would have never have achieved its goals without a solid scientific base. Ultimately, it depended upon Russell-Jones, a junior hospital doctor, and Robert Stephens, a respected scientist, both with sufficient confidence in their own judgement to risk their professional reputations in pursuit of a cause.

When CLEAR was launched, the blood lead level regarded as safe by the medical profession in the UK was 35 microgrammes per decilitre of blood. In 1991, the level deemed safe by the US Centre for Disease Control (CDC) was lowered to 10, but the CDC now accepts that there is no safe threshold and define a level above 5 as a cause for concern.

== Background ==
Tetraethyl lead was first added to gasoline in the 1920s as an "anti-knock" agent, which is a cheap method of boosting the octane rating. It is not possible to use catalytic converters with leaded fuel as the lead coats the platinum and renders the catalyst ineffective. Lead free gasoline was therefore introduced into Japan in the late sixties, and into the US in the mid seventies in order to enable the use of catalytic converters and thus mitigate photochemical pollution.

However, by 1979, in the face of growing evidence of the harmful effects of lead on children's behaviour, neuro-cognitive development and IQ, the Department of Health and Social Security (DHSS) commissioned a report under the Chairmanship of Lawther. The subsequent report, Lead and Health, recommended that the lead content of petrol should be reduced from 0.4 to 0.15 g/L, but there was no recommendation to introduce lead-free petrol. Nor was there any recommendation to lower the lead level deemed safe from 35 microgrammes per decilitre of blood.

In 1980 the Conservation Society Pollution Working Party published a response to the Lawther report "Lead or Health" co-authored by Derek Bryce-Smith, Professor of Organic Chemistry at Reading University, and Robert Stephens, Reader in Organic Chemistry at the University of Birmingham, but HMG resisted their call for unleaded petrol under pressure from both the motor manufacturers and the petroleum industry.

== Objectives ==
The first edition of CLEAR's newspaper listed the campaign's objectives:

- To urge that the fixed limit of 0.15 grams per litre for lead in petrol should be introduced earlier than the official date of 1985 and be for existing cars only.
- To demand that as soon as possible, and in any event by 1985, all new cars sold in the UK market be required to run on lead-free petrol.
- To demand that as soon as possible, and in any event by early 1985, all petrol stations be required to have lead-free petrol available for sale to the public.
- To urge that taxation on the sale of petrol should be imposed to create a price advantage to motorists purchasing lead-free petrol.
- To maintain surveillance on the use of lead generally and to encourage enforcement of measures necessary to reduce lead pollution wherever it occurs.

== International conference ==
In 1982 the CLEAR Charitable Trust organized an international conference on the biological effects of low-level lead exposure, and the subsequent proceedings, "Lead versus Health", were co-edited by Russell-Jones and Michael Rutter FRS, Professor of Child Psychiatry at the Institute of Psychiatry. A key chapter (8), "The contribution of lead in petrol to human lead intake", was co-authored by Russell-Jones and Dr Bob Stephens, and concluded that lead in petrol was contributing at least 70% to the lead intake of a 2-year-old child in Western society. This contrasted with the Government's figure of 10 per cent as outlined in the Lawther Report which had ignored the contamination of above-ground crops by airborne lead.

Other key chapters were provided by Herbert Needleman from Harvard University (Chapter 12) and Clair Patterson from the California Institute of Technology (Chapter 2). In 1979, Needleman had published a seminal paper in the New England Journal of Medicine that demonstrated dose-dependent relationships between elevated levels of lead in shed milk teeth and a host of negative outcomes in children, including distractibility, hyperactivity, lower IQ and a tendency to get easily frustrated.

Clair Patterson had built an ultra-clean laboratory in the early fifties in order to measure the minuscule quantities of lead isotopes in an iron meteorite from the birth of the Solar System; by which means he was able to date the age of the Earth at 4.55 billion years, an estimate that has never been superseded. Using his ultraclean facility, Patterson was able to demonstrate that natural levels of lead in prehistoric and pristine samples were orders of magnitude lower than official estimates, most of which were measuring lead contamination. His key contribution was his "measles diagram" demonstrating that if the lead burden of a pre-technological human was represented by one dot, and a patient with clinical lead poisoning was represented by 2000 dots, then the lead burden of a typical adult living in Western society was represented by 500 dots. For no other toxin was there such a narrow gap between what is known to be typical and what is known to be toxic.

However, the reason that the conference created headlines was because Professor Rutter, who had sat on the Lawther Committee, changed his mind about the causality of lead, and its association with lower IQ in children.
