= The Wilton Arms =

Pub in Belgravia, London

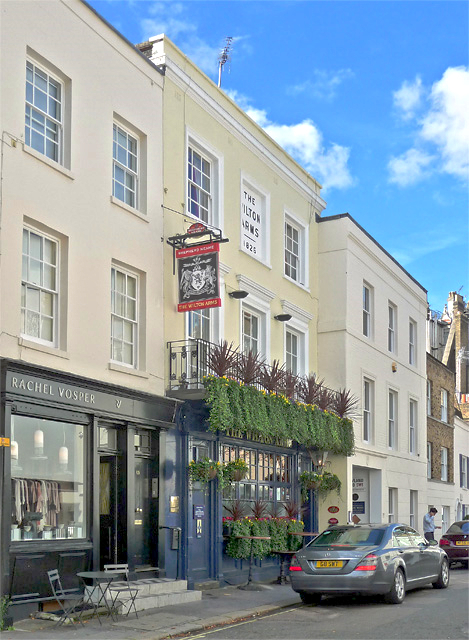
- The Wilton Arms
- Type: Public house
- Location: Kinnerton Street, Belgravia, London
- Coordinates: 51°30′5″N 0°9′26″W
- Built: 1825–26

Listed Building – Grade II
- Official name: Wilton Arms
- Designated: 05-Sep-1995
- Reference no.: 1251180

The Wilton Arms is a Grade II listed public house located in Kinnerton Street, Belgravia, London and built in 1825–26.

The lease was held by Shepherd Neame, and the pub closed in July 2019. It is now leased by Inda Pubs, and reopened in September 2021.
