= Help Rescue The Planet =

UK Climate Change educational body

Help Rescue The Planet is an educational charity dedicated to minimising air pollution and mitigating climate change. In 2012 it organised the St George's House Consultations in Windsor and The International Conference on Climate Change in London. Trustees include Dr Robin Russell-Jones, Dr Charles Tannock, MEP and Baroness Walmsley.
