= Robin Russell-Jones =

British doctor

Robin Russell-Jones is a medical doctor known for his work on environmental pollution and public health. His work has influenced several key areas of environmental policy in the UK, including the decision to ban lead in petrol, introduce catalytic converters in petrol driven vehicles, and change official guidelines on exposure to ionising radiation. His letters and articles have raised awareness of ozone depletion and global warming.

== Education ==
Although a medical scholar at Peterhouse, Cambridge, he graduated with a degree in the History of Art. He completed his clinical training at St Thomas’ Hospital, London, obtained his MRCP in 1974 and specialized in dermatology. He holds both FRCP and FRCPath.

== Biography ==
In 1981 Russell-Jones became Medical and Scientific Advisor to CLEAR, The Campaign for Lead-Free Air. In 1982 he organized an international conference on the biological effects of low-level lead exposure, and the subsequent proceedings, Lead versus Health, were edited with Michael Rutter FRS, Professor of Child Psychiatry at the Institute of Psychiatry. In 1983 Russell-Jones gave evidence to the Royal Commission on Environmental Pollution whose Ninth report, Lead in the Environment, persuaded the UK Government to introduce lead-free petrol.

In 1986 he organized a conference on the biological effects of low-level exposure to ionizing radiation, and the subsequent proceedings were edited with Sir Richard Southwood FRS, Professor of Zoology at Oxford, and Chair of the NRPB. International cancer risk estimates were subsequently revised upwards and dose limits for nuclear workers and the public were lowered.

In 1988 he organized a conference on ozone depletion, and the subsequent proceedings were edited with Tom Wigley who was head of the Climatic Research Unit at the University of East Anglia.The following year Margaret Thatcher hosted a UN conference in London on ozone depletion which led eventually to the Montreal Protocol.

In 1989 Russell-Jones was the anonymous author of an editorial for The Lancet, Health in the Greenhouse, the first time that any medical journal addressed the health impacts of global warming, which concluded as follows: “Any strategy to combat global warming must be conducted on a global scale and is bound to involve enormous investment in energy conservation, reforestation, renewable sources of energy and changing patterns of agriculture and transportation. This approach will require a new agenda for world leaders, a new role for the United Nations Environmental Programme, and a new awareness of man’s fundamental reliance on the integrity of world ecosystems. The expense may be considerable, but the cost of doing nothing is incalculable.”

In 2012 he established a small educational charity Help Rescue the Planet and organized an international conference at the Royal Institute of British Architects, London on climate change.

Russell-Jones was the Scientific Advisor to the All-Party Parliamentary Group (APPG) on Air Pollution from 2017–2021. He helped draft two Private Members’ Bills on air quality and fracking. He wrote the Council of Europe’s position statement on fracking (The exploitation of non-conventional hydrocarbons).

In 2024, Russell-Jones published two pieces: “Hazards in the Greenhouse: Why is global warming so intractable?”, which discusses the difficulty of achieving political action on climate change, and “Hiatus in the Greenhouse: Has the IPCC helped or hindered?”, co-authored with Tom Wigley. This paper criticised the IPCC and their failure to consider falling aerosol loading of the atmosphere in their temperature predictions. Instead of targeting net-zero for greenhouse gases (GHG) by 2050, the paper argues that achieving "all-species" net-zero by 2050 would require the date for GHG net-zero to be 2036.

== Publications ==
- Rutter, Sir Michael; Russell-Jones, Robin (1983). Lead versus Health: the biological effects of low-level lead exposure. Hoboken: Wiley. ISBN 9780471900283.
- Russell-Jones, Robin (1987). Radiation and health: The biological effects of low-level exposure to ionizing radiation. Hoboken: Wiley. ISBN 9780471916741.
- Wigley, Tom; Russell-Jones, Robin (1989). Ozone Depletion: Health and Environmental Consequences. Hoboken: Wiley. ISBN 9780471923169.
- Russell-Jones, Robin (2017). The Gilgamesh Gene. London: Shepheard-Walwyn. ISBN 9780856835148.
- Russell-Jones, Robin (2021). The Gilgamesh Gene Revisited. London: Shepheard-Walwyn. ISBN 9780856835490.
