= Sigrid McCawley =

American attorney

- Born: Upstate New York, U.S.
- Education: University of Florida (BA, JD)
- Occupation: Attorney
- Employer: Boies Schiller Flexner
- Known for: Representing victims of Jeffrey Epstein
- Title: Co-managing partner at Boies Schiller Flexner
- Term: 2020–present
- Spouse: Daniel McCawley
- Children: 4

Sigrid McCawley is an American attorney who is known for representing victims of Jeffrey Epstein such as Virginia Giuffre and others in several civil cases against their abusers. McCawley is one of the co-managing partners of Boies Schiller Flexner, a firm where she has worked for more than 20 years. As part of the firm, she has represented clients in several notable cases including class action suits against Amway and Halliburton. Before joining Boies Schiller Flexner, McCawley practiced law in Washington, D.C., with Morgan, Lewis & Bockius and clerked for U.S. District Judge Jose Gonzalez Jr. in the Southern District of Florida.

== Early life and education ==
Sigrid McCawley was born in Upstate New York. She attended the University of Florida, where she graduated in 1994 with a B.A. in history. In 1997, she graduated with a J.D from the University of Florida's Levin College of Law.

== Career ==
After law school, McCawley had a clerkship with Judge Jose Gonzalez Jr. at the U.S. District Court for the Southern District of Florida. In 1999, McCawley joined Morgan, Lewis & Bockius in Washington, D.C. After two years at Morgan Lewis, in 2001, McCawley moved to Fort Lauderdale, Florida, where she joined Boies Schiller Flexner, a firm based in New York City and led by David Boies who was establishing operations in South Florida. As this was a small office, McCawley was often given the opportunity to represent the firm's large clients, companies such as Del Monte Foods and Carnival Cruise Line.

In 2014, Boies Schiller Flexner began representing Virginia Giuffre, a victim of Jeffrey Epstein who also accused Alan Dershowitz and Prince Andrew, Duke of York of sexually abusing her when she was a minor. McCawley was assigned to take on the case because of her experience volunteering with abuse victims in the foster care system. In September 2015, Boies and McCawley filed a defamation suit against Ghislaine Maxwell on behalf of Giuffre. McCawley was not the first to represent Giuffre but the case against Maxwell, who is also accused of recruiting minors for Epstein and others, brought new attention to the case. The firm decided to file for defamation because the statute of limitations for criminal charges had expired. In May 2017, they reached an undisclosed settlement, but Giuffre reportedly received a sum in the multimillion-dollar range.

Besides representing Epstein's victims, McCawley also brought a class action suit against Amway which was accused of fraud and racketeering. After a decade-long litigation battle, she reached a $155 million settlement with the company. In another case, her team litigated a securities fraud class action suit against Halliburton. The case against the energy company twice went to the Supreme Court before reaching a $100 million settlement in 2018.

In December 2019, McCawley became an equity partner at Boies Schiller Flexner. By this point, she had been representing the victims in the Jeffrey Epstein case pro bono for the past five and half years, including directly representing eight women and as co-counsel for three others. In October 2020, McCawley also won a lawsuit to unseal the deposition transcripts from the earlier settled defamation lawsuit against Maxwell. The unsealed transcripts led to criminal charges being filed against Maxwell. In December 2020, McCawley was appointed one of three co-managing partners at Boies Schiller Flexner.

After filing a civil sex assault case against Prince Andrew in which he was scheduled to be deposed in March 2022, the BBC wrote in February 2022 that McCawley "is considered one of America's lead attorneys for sexual abuse cases". Before the date of the deposition, Prince Andrew reached a settlement of an undisclosed amount including "a substantial donation to Ms. Giuffre's charity in support of victims' rights". For her work representing victims of sexual abuse, McCawley was chosen as a finalist for The American Lawyer's Attorney of the Year.

== Personal life ==
McCawley is married to Daniel McCawley, a real estate attorney who is a partner with Fort Lauderdale based law firm, Greenberg Traurig. They have four children.
