= Photograph of Prince Andrew, Virginia Giuffre and Ghislaine Maxwell =

2001 photograph by Jeffrey Epstein

- Prince Andrew posing with his arm around Virginia Giuffre, with Ghislaine Maxwell standing nearby
- Artist: Jeffrey Epstein
- Completion date: 10 March 2001
- Medium: Photograph
- Condition: Lost
- Location: 44 Kinnerton Street, London, England
- Owner: Virginia Giuffre

Prince Andrew, Virginia Giuffre and Ghislaine Maxwell were photographed in 2001 by Jeffrey Epstein at Maxwell's home in the Belgravia district of London. It was published for the first time in a cropped version in 2011 by the Mail on Sunday; the newspaper subsequently published the full image in 2019. In 2021, Giuffre filed a civil lawsuit against Andrew alleging she was forced into sexual encounters with him as a teenager after being trafficked by Epstein. Andrew denied the allegations before entering into an out-of-court settlement in 2022.

The image is one of the best-known images associated with Giuffre's allegations, with one reporter calling it "a prequel and postscript of the saga". Its authenticity has been disputed by Andrew and Maxwell. Maxwell's later statements appeared to conflict with an email apparently written by her and released as part of the Epstein files. A 2011 email from Epstein, published by Democratic members of the U.S. House Oversight Committee, appeared to support the photograph's authenticity. Hany Farid, an expert in image manipulation, said he saw no "obvious signs" of manipulation. The whereabouts of the original photograph are unknown.

== Description and history ==
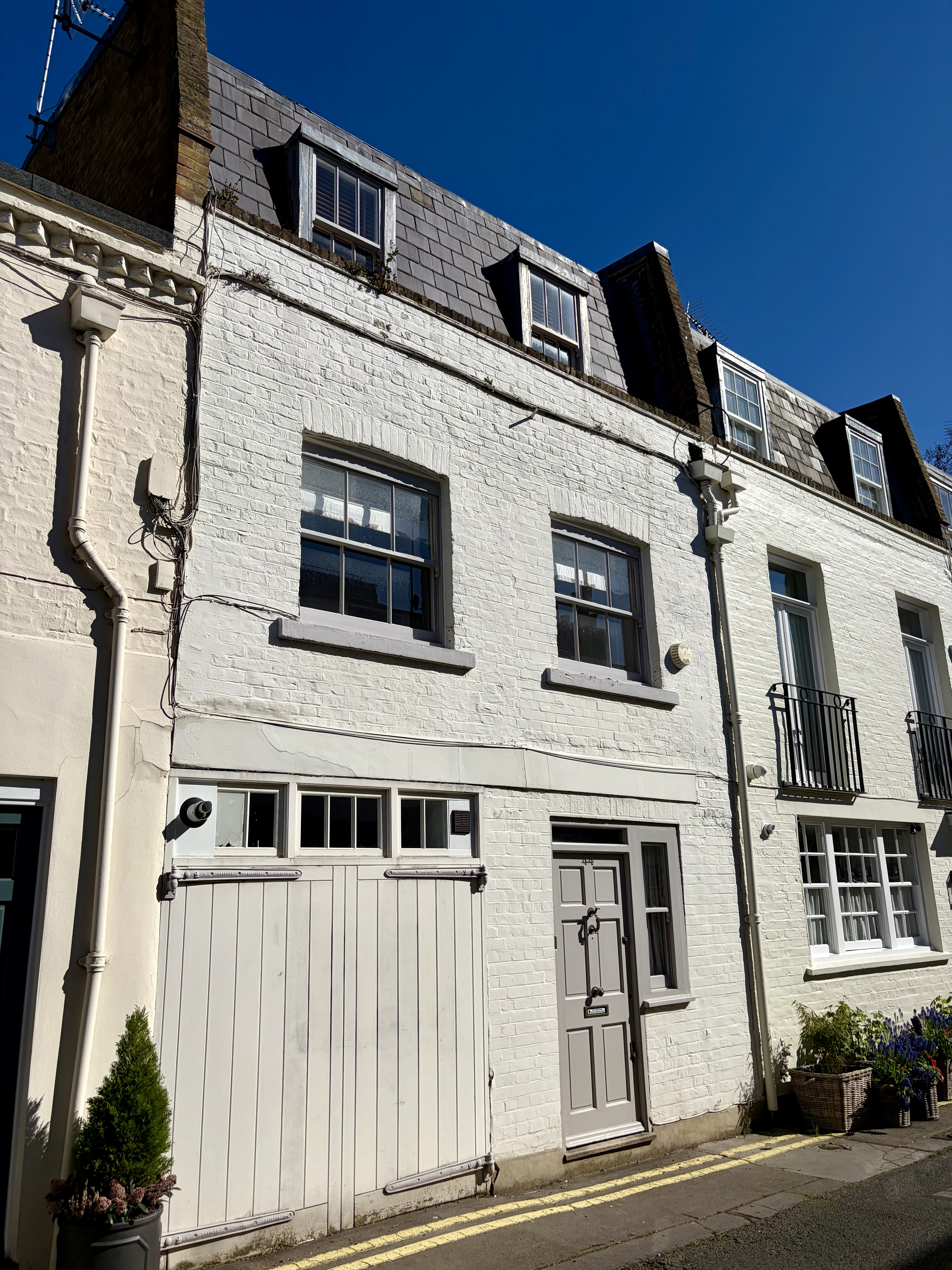
44 Kinnerton Street in Belgravia, London, where the photograph was reportedly taken in 2001. Exterior windows of the house have been compared with those visible in the image.

The image shows Andrew standing beside 17-year-old Giuffre, with one arm around her waist, while Maxwell stands nearby. A camera flash reflected in the window obscures the person taking the photograph. Giuffre said that the photograph was taken by Jeffrey Epstein on the evening of 10 March 2001. The windows visible in the image appear to match those of Maxwell's London home at 44 Kinnerton Street in Belgravia district. The photograph was taken with a yellow Kodak camera that Epstein had given Giuffre. She said the image was taken because she wanted something to show her mother. In an interview with Mail on Sunday, Giuffre said that she had been "flown across the world to be introduced to" Andrew. She alleged that, after visiting Tramp nightclub, she had sex with Andrew at Maxwell's Belgravia house. Andrew disputed the allegation, saying that on 10 March he took Princess Beatrice to a PizzaExpress in Woking in the late afternoon and was at home later that day.

In February 2011, the News of the World published a photograph of Epstein walking with Andrew in New York's Central Park in 2010. Epstein had been released from prison in July 2009 after pleading guilty to state charges of solicitation of prostitution and of solicitation of prostitution with a minor under the age of 18.

A week after the publication of the Central Park photograph, the Mail on Sunday asked Giuffre for evidence of her allegations that she had been trafficked for sex by Epstein and Maxwell. Giuffre gave the Mail on Sunday the photograph of her, Andrew, and Maxwell which they published. The image does not appear to have been publicly circulated before the Mail on Sunday published it. The newspaper paid Giuffre $140,000 to publish the image and $20,000 for two interviews with her.

The publicly circulated version was not the original print, but a 2011 photograph of it taken by New Zealand photographer Michael Thomas. An uncropped version released in 2019 showed a blurry thumb on the right of the image, along with more of the room interior.

In 2021, The Daily Telegraph reported that Maxwell was selling the house at 44 Kinnerton Street. The sale was expected to increase funds Maxwell had set aside for legal fees.

== Significance, commentary and reactions ==
On 9 August 2021, Giuffre filed a civil lawsuit against Andrew alleging that she was forced to have several sexual encounters with him after being trafficked by Epstein when she was 16 and 17 years old. Andrew denied Giuffre's claims. On 15 February 2022, the parties reached an out-of-court settlement, with no admission of liability from Andrew. The settlement was reported to be £12 million, part of which went to SOAR (Speak Out, Act, Reclaim), an advocacy charity for survivors of sex trafficking that Giuffre had founded.

The photograph became one of the best-known images associated with Giuffre's allegations against Andrew. Writing for The Guardian, Edward Helmore described it as "a prequel and postscript of the saga". Wendy Murphy, a former sex crimes prosecutor, told The Guardian that there was no "innocent explanation" for Andrew to be hugging Giuffre in a social situation. Murphy stated that the photograph would have had less significance if it did not show "a member of the royal family with a person from a very different social class", while noting that the image did not depict sexual assault.

== Authenticity ==
=== Challenges to authenticity ===
In his 2019 BBC interview with Emily Maitlis, Andrew said that he had "absolutely no memory of that photograph ever being taken" but that he recognised himself in the photograph. He said his side could not establish whether the image had been faked because the circulating version was generations removed from the original. He told Maitlis that he had never seen Epstein with a camera and that he did not remember ever going upstairs in Maxwell's house. He also said that as a member of the British royal family he was not inclined to hug people or show public affection. News.com.au noted that archived photographs later showed Andrew hugging or kissing several public figures. He also said he did not believe the photograph showed him in London, saying that when he went out in London he wore a suit and tie and describing the clothes in the image as travelling clothes.

In the aftermath of Epstein's suicide in 2019, two newspaper articles quoting unnamed 'friends' of Andrew appeared in The Daily Telegraph and the Evening Standard asserting that his fingers differed from those shown in the image. An unnamed friend quoted by The Daily Telegraph argued that the image had been faked because Andrew's fingers appeared too slender, while a source quoted by the Evening Standard said his fingers did not look right. The Daily Telegraph also reported contentions from sources close to Andrew that the relative heights of Andrew and Giuffre in the image were inconsistent with other photographs and reported height estimates. The Daily Mail reported that his height was c. 182 cm and Giuffre's was c. 176 cm.

In a 2023 interview, Maxwell stated that she did not believe the photograph was real, could not recall it being taken and had no memory of Giuffre and Andrew ever meeting. She pointed to the absence of the original and argued that some experts had questioned parts of the image.

=== Support for authenticity ===
Michael Thomas, who photographed the original print in 2011, said he did not doubt the image's authenticity. He stated that he had "always believed it was real" and that if it had been fake, news media companies would be sued for using the image. Thomas said that when he saw the photograph it was in among Giuffre's "typical teenage snaps".

Hany Farid, professor at the University of California, Berkeley and an expert in image manipulation, examined the image at the request of The Times. Farid said that the close placement of Andrew and Giuffre made a full-body splice unlikely, that the lighting of Andrew's head appeared consistent with the body and scene making a head-only splice unlikely, and that the consistent colour and resolution of Andrew's hands made a splice of the left hand unlikely. Farid cautioned that the image's low quality made detailed analysis difficult, but said: "I can't say for sure that the image is authentic, but I don't see any obvious signs of manipulation".

In a 2022 News.com.au article, Elser wrote that exterior photographs of 44 Kinnerton Street showed six-paned windows that looked near-identical to those visible behind Maxwell, while noting that the interior layout had not been fully verified. In February 2026, BBC News reported that an email, seemingly from Maxwell, released by the US Department of Justice as part of the Epstein files described Giuffre meeting Andrew in London in 2001 and appeared to confirm that a photograph had been taken. The report also noted a 2011 Epstein email, published by Democratic members of the U.S. House Oversight Committee in 2025, in which he stated that Giuffre had been photographed with Andrew.

=== Existence and location of the original photograph ===
The original print has not been publicly produced. Andrew's lawyers sought access to it during litigation, but reports indicated that Giuffre's legal team did not know its whereabouts. In a 2016 deposition, Giuffre said she had previously lent it to the FBI and believed it might be among stored family boxes in Australia. In 2022, News.com.au cited a Daily Beast report saying that a source close to Giuffre did not know whether she still had the original, or whether the original photograph even still existed.
