= Virginia Giuffre =

American and Australian advocate (1983–2025)

- Born: Virginia Lee Roberts; 9 August 1983; Sacramento, California, U.S.
- Died: 25 April 2025 (aged 41); Neergabby, Western Australia, Australia
- Cause of death: Suicide
- Citizenship: United States; Australia
- Organization: Speak Out, Act, Reclaim (SOAR), formerly known as Victims Refuse Silence
- Known for: Advocate of justice for sex trafficking survivors
- Notable work: Nobody's Girl
- Spouse: Robert Giuffre (m. 2002; sep. 2024)
- Children: 3
- Awards: 2026 Book of the Year British Book Awards

Virginia Lee Roberts Giuffre (/ˈdʒuːfreɪ/ JOO-fray; née Roberts; 9 August 1983 – 25 April 2025) was an American and Australian advocate for survivors of sex trafficking and one of the most prominent accusers of Jeffrey Epstein. Giuffre provided detailed allegations to media outlets about Epstein and Ghislaine Maxwell. She alleged that Epstein ran a trafficking ring, outsourcing girls for sexual services.

In March 2011, Giuffre first described meeting Andrew Mountbatten-Windsor to the Daily Mail, which reported there was "no suggestion" of sexual contact. The same month, Giuffre was interviewed by the FBI, where she alleged that Epstein and Maxwell had trafficked her to men, including Mountbatten-Windsor.

She publicly claimed she was trafficked to Andrew on 3 different occasions in a 2019 BBC interview, shifting public opinion against the prince. Andrew denied the allegations. In 2021, she filed the civil suit Giuffre v. Prince Andrew. The lawsuit was settled in February 2022. Andrew paid Giuffre an undisclosed amount, made a donation to her charity, denied wrongdoing, and settled without admission of liability.

Giuffre pursued criminal and civil actions against Epstein and Maxwell. In 2015, she sued Maxwell for defamation. The case was settled in 2017 for an undisclosed sum. In 2015, Giuffre founded Victims Refuse Silence, a United States-based non-profit organization supporting survivors of abuse, which relaunched as Speak Out, Act, Reclaim (SOAR) in 2021. In 2014, she claimed Alan Dershowitz had sexually abused her (which he denied). After multiple lawsuits for defamation were filed between Giuffre and Dershowitz, both parties dropped their claims in 2022 and Giuffre said she "may have made a mistake" in identifying Dershowitz.

According to documents released in 2026 as part of the Epstein files, FBI investigators were unable to substantiate Giuffre's allegation that Epstein "lent" girls out to other powerful men, and stated in a 2019 memo that she gave "shifting accounts", and made public statements described as "sensationalized" or "demonstrably inaccurate". Giuffre died by suicide in April 2025. Her memoir, Nobody's Girl, was published posthumously in October 2025.

== Early life ==
Virginia Lee Roberts was born in Sacramento, California, on 9 August 1983, to Lynn Trude Cabell and Sky William Roberts. She had an elder half-brother, Daniel Scott Wilson, from her mother's previous marriage, and a younger brother, Sky Rocket Roberts. The family relocated to Loxahatchee, in Palm Beach County, Florida, when she was in grade school. It was reported that she had come from a "troubled home", and from the age of seven was molested by a close family friend.

In her 2025 posthumous memoir, Nobody's Girl, Giuffre wrote that, between the ages of 7–11, she was sexually molested by her father, and traded to a family friend who was later convicted of sexually abusing another minor. Her father has denied the claims. Giuffre also suggested that her father may have taken money from Epstein. Giuffre said that she went from being in "an abusive situation, to being a runaway, to living in foster homes". She lived on the streets at age 14, where she says she found only "hunger and pain and [more] abuse".

At some point between age 13 and age 15, Giuffre was abused by a sex trafficker, Ron Eppinger, in Miami. Giuffre lived with Eppinger for approximately six months. Eppinger reportedly ran a front business for international sex trafficking known as the modeling agency "Perfect 10" and was investigated by the FBI. He later pleaded guilty to charges of alien smuggling for prostitution, interstate travel for prostitution, and money laundering.

Giuffre was sent to Growing Together, a troubled teen industry (TTI) facility in Lake Worth, Florida, that was later shut down after an investigation.

In 1998, Giuffre's mother heard from a social worker at her group home that 14-year-old Giuffre had sex with two older teenage males, prompting her to contact the police. Giuffre told police that two acquaintances, Josh (18) and Kevin (17), had sexually assaulted her in a car for seven hours while she was intoxicated. Both males admitted to having sex with Giuffre, but argued it was consensual and that they were all intoxicated. Josh and Kevin were booked for probable charges of sexual assault. After a three-month investigation, prosecutors decided not to bring charges, citing "the victim's lack of credibility and no substantial likelihood of success at trial".

Giuffre attended Royal Palm Beach High School. In her memoir, Giuffre said that at age 16 she had quit school after completing the ninth grade. Giuffre's father worked as a maintenance manager at the Mar-a-Lago property owned by Donald Trump, and he helped Giuffre obtain a job there in 2000 when she was 16 years old.

== Association with Jeffrey Epstein ==
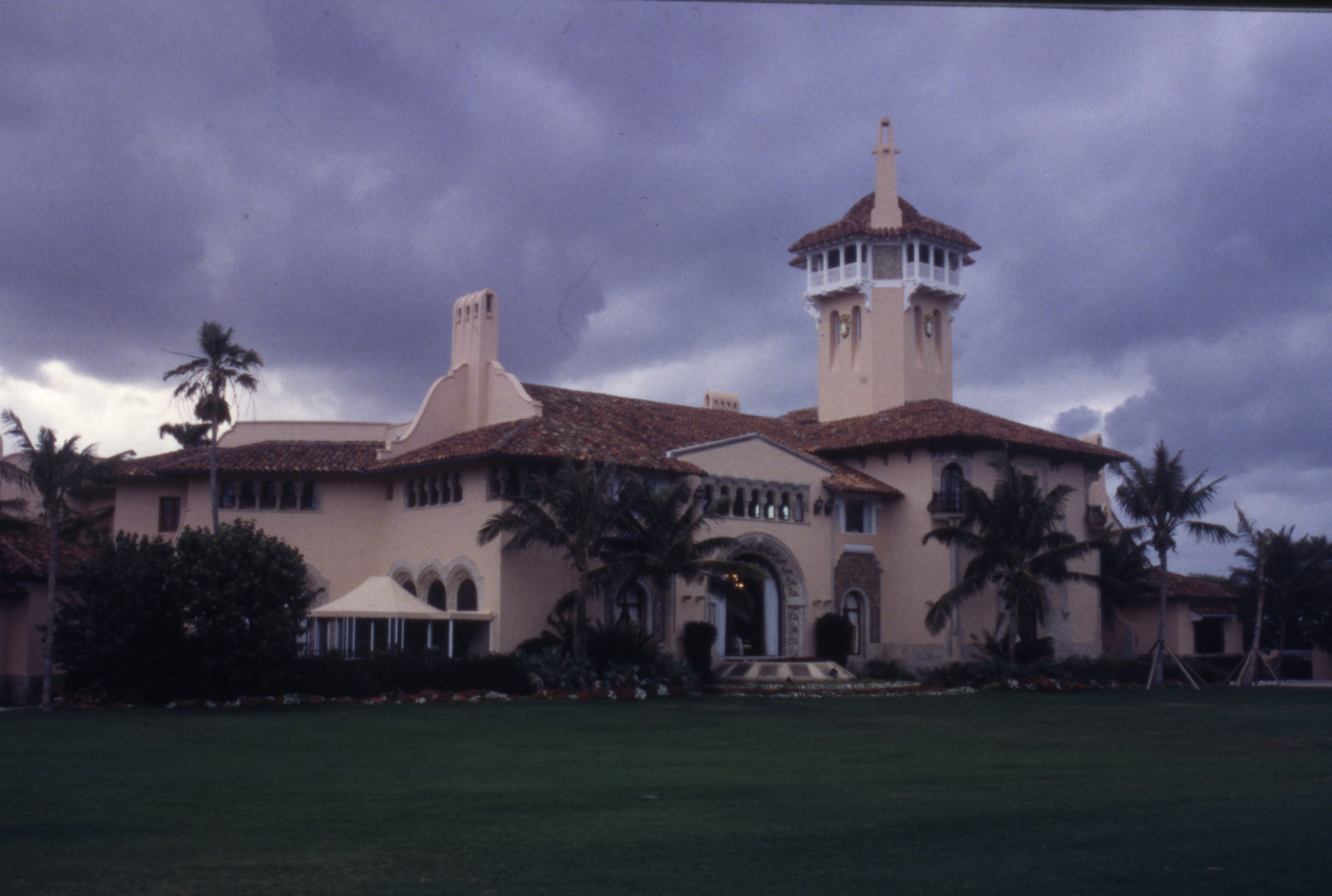
Mar-a-Lago in 1999

In mid-2000, Giuffre met Ghislaine Maxwell when working as a spa attendant at Mar-a-Lago, while reading a book about massage therapy. Maxwell, a British socialite and daughter of media tycoon Robert Maxwell, approached Giuffre, noted the book that she was reading, inquired about her interest in massage, and offered her a potential job working for Epstein as a traveling masseuse with the assurance that no experience was necessary. When Giuffre arrived at Epstein's Palm Beach home, she says he was lying down, naked, and Maxwell told her how to massage him. "They seemed like nice people so I trusted them, and I told them I'd had a really hard time in my life up until then—I'd been a runaway, I'd been sexually abused, physically abused. ... That was the worst thing I could have told them because now they knew how vulnerable I was", Giuffre stated. Giuffre stated that after Maxwell introduced her to Jeffrey Epstein, the two quickly began grooming her to provide sexual services, under the guise that she was to be trained as a professional massage therapist.

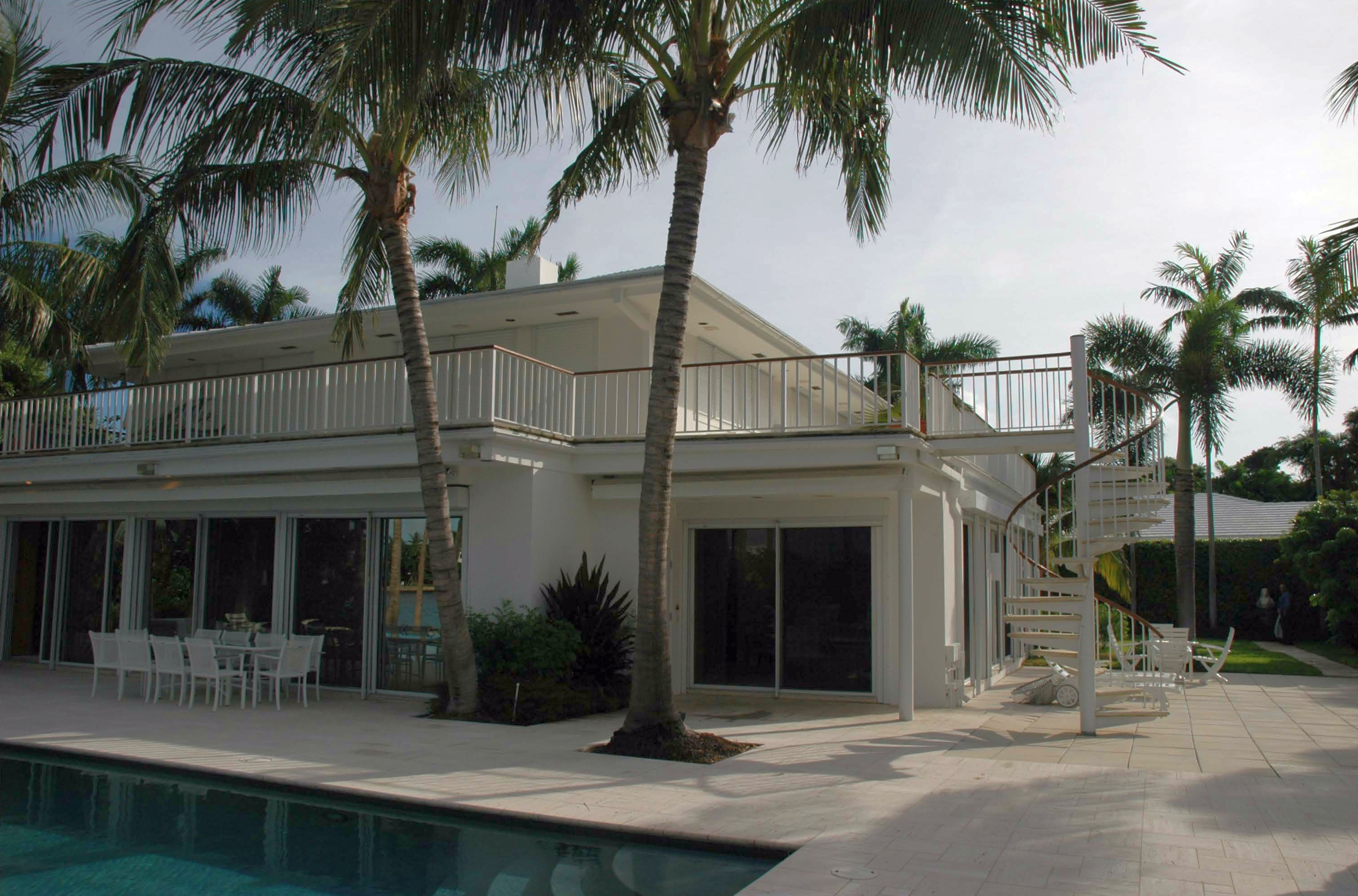
Epstein's Palm Beach home

Between 2000 and 2002, Giuffre was closely associated with Epstein and Maxwell, traveling between Epstein's residences in Palm Beach (at 358 El Brillo Way) and Manhattan (at the Herbert N. Straus House), with additional trips to Epstein's Zorro Ranch in New Mexico and private island Little Saint James. In the Miami Herald's investigative journalism series "Perversion of Justice", Giuffre describes her experiences of being trafficked by Epstein to provide massages and sexual services for him and a number of his business associates, over a two-and-a-half-year period. In her interview with the BBC, Giuffre said she was "passed around like a platter of fruit" to Epstein's powerful associates, and taken around the world on private jets.

Of the instance in March 2001 that Giuffre was allegedly trafficked to Prince Andrew, she stated in an interview that it was a "wicked" and "really scary time" in her life, and that she "couldn't comprehend how in the highest level of the government powerful people were allowing this to happen. Not just allowing but participating in it". After visiting a nightclub, Giuffre says Maxwell told her that she "had to do for Andrew what I do for Jeffrey". In court documents from a civil suit that were released from seal in 2019, Giuffre named several others that she claimed Epstein and Maxwell instructed her to have sex with, including hedge fund manager Glenn Dubin, attorney Alan Dershowitz, politician Bill Richardson, MIT scientist Marvin Minsky, lawyer George J. Mitchell, and MC2 modeling agent Jean-Luc Brunel. The men denied Giuffre's allegations.

In September 2002, at the age of 19, Giuffre flew to Thailand and attended the International Training Massage School in Chiang Mai. Maxwell provided her with tickets to travel to Thailand, and instructed her to meet with a specific Thai girl, and to bring her back to the United States for Epstein. While at the massage school in Thailand in 2002, she met Robert Giuffre, an Australian martial arts trainer and married him 10 days later. She contacted Epstein and informed him that she would not be returning as planned. She and her husband started a life and family in Australia, and Giuffre broke off contact with Epstein and Maxwell.

=== First contact by authorities ===
In March 2005, while Giuffre was still establishing her family in Australia, the Palm Beach Police Department began investigating Epstein after a 14-year-old girl and her parents reported his behavior. The girl described being recruited by a female classmate from her high school to give Epstein a massage at his mansion in exchange for money, wherein he subsequently molested her. By October 2005, the police had a growing list of girls with similar claims of sexual abuse, statements from Epstein's butlers corroborating their claims, and a search warrant for his Palm Beach property. Police detectives noted that the accusers all described a similar pattern, where Epstein would ask them to massage him and then sexually assault them during the massage. When police searched through Epstein's trash, they found notes with the telephone numbers of the girls on them. One of the girls was called by Epstein's assistant while being questioned by police.

In 2019, Giuffre told the Miami Herald that she received a series of phone calls in rapid succession over three days in 2007. She said the first call was from Maxwell, then one day later came a call from Epstein, both of whom asked if she had spoken to authorities. These were followed by a third call from an FBI agent, who stated that Giuffre had been identified as a victim during the first criminal case against Epstein. Giuffre says she resisted speaking at length to the FBI until she was approached again about the matter in person, this time by the Australian Federal Police, six months after being contacted by phone.

== Legal proceedings ==
=== Jane Doe No. 102 v. Jeffrey Epstein (2009) ===
In May 2009, Giuffre filed a lawsuit as Jane Doe 102 against Epstein and accused Maxwell of recruiting her to a life of being sexually trafficked while she was a minor. The 2009 suit stated that "In addition to being continually exploited to satisfy defendant's [Epstein] every sexual whim, [Ms Giuffre] was also required to be sexually exploited by defendant's adult male peers, including "royalty, politicians, academicians, businessmen and or other professional and personal acquaintances." At the time, she named Epstein and Maxwell but did not identify any of the men. Dozens of Epstein's victims had filed civil lawsuits against him and by late 2009, all suits were settled. The settlement amount of the case, entitled Jane Doe No. 102 vs. Jeffrey Epstein, was $500,000 (equivalent to $750,000 in 2025) and other unspecified "valuable consideration".

=== Decision to speak out publicly ===
Giuffre credits the birth of her daughter on 7 January 2010, as the date she decided to speak out publicly. She also described being motivated to act after seeing a photograph showing Epstein and Andrew walking together in Central Park published in News of the World in late 2010. Vanity Fair stated that Giuffre's story was first publicized in March 2011 by the Mail on Sunday (Daily Mail), the coverage included the photo showing Mountbatten-Windsor with his arm around her at Maxwell's house in Belgravia, London. In 2011, FBI agents again made contact with Giuffre, this time at the US consulate in Sydney, soon after she went public with allegations against Epstein.

=== Andrew Mountbatten-Windsor allegations and settlement ===
Giuffre first described meeting the former Prince Andrew to the Daily Mail in March 2011, in an interview for which she was paid $160,000. At the time, Sharon Churcher of the Daily Mail stated there was "no suggestion that there was any sexual contact between Virginia and Prince Andrew, or that Prince Andrew knew that Epstein paid her to have sex with his friends." (Note: Churcher also published an article Archived 2019-10-16 at the Wayback Machinein the Daily Telegraph on 1 March, stating "While Ms Roberts said there was never any sexual relationship between the Prince and herself, she claims that as a 17-year-old she met the Prince on three occasions - at one of which she was told to sit on his knee while he touched another woman's breast.") Following the DailyMail article, Giuffre was interviewed by the FBI. She alleged that Epstein and Maxwell had trafficked her to men including Andrew Mountbatten-Windsor.

In a December 2014 Florida court filing, intended for inclusion in the 2008 Crime Victims' Rights Act lawsuit, Giuffre described being sexually trafficked to Mountbatten-Windsor at least three times in 2001 when she was 17. She stated that Epstein and Maxwell took her to Tramp nightclub in London, where she met and danced with Andrew and that later that night, while en route to Maxwell's Belgravia residence, Maxwell instructed Giuffre to "do for (Prince Andrew) what you do for Epstein". She alleged that Epstein paid her $15,000 after she had sex with Andrew in London.

Photograph of Virginia Giuffre, Ghislaine Maxwell and Andrew Mountbatten-Windsor from March 2001, first published by The Mail on Sunday in 2011

The article included a photo depicting Giuffre, Mountbatten-Windsor, and Maxwell, in Maxwell's apartment. Prince Andrew's ten-year role as a United Kingdom trade envoy was terminated in July 2011, and he reportedly cut all ties with Epstein. Maxwell, while serving her prison sentence, stated to several interviewers that she believed the photograph was fake. Following the allegations, The Mail on Sunday was contacted by the photographer Michael Thomas, who took 39 copies of it, front and back. The back of the photo has a time stamp showing it was developed on 13 March 2001 – three days after Andrew allegedly engaged in sexual activity with Giuffre – and it was printed at a one-hour photo lab at Walgreens in Florida near Giuffre's former home. An email sent by "G Maxwell" to Jeffrey Epstein in 2015, released as part of the Epstein files, appears to confirm that a photograph had been taken, reading: "In 2001 I was in London when [redacted] met a number of friends of mine including Prince Andrew. A photograph was taken as I imagine she wanted to show it to friends and family."

The second sexual encounter with Andrew allegedly happened at Epstein's New York mansion. In court documents, Giuffre stated that the third encounter with Andrew was an orgy on Little Saint James that involved her, several underage girls from Eastern Europe, the prince, and Epstein himself. In 2015, spokespersons for the British royal family stated that "any suggestion of impropriety with underage minors is categorically untrue", later repeating the denials. Requests from Giuffre's lawyers for a statement under oath from Mountbatten-Windsor about the allegations were returned unanswered. In her posthumous memoir Nobody's Girl, Giuffre stated that she first had sex with Andrew on 10 March 2001.

==== Launch of civil lawsuit: Giuffre v. Prince Andrew (2021) and settlement ====
On 9 August 2021, Giuffre filed a civil lawsuit in New York against Prince Andrew alleging that she was forced to have several sexual encounters with him in the early 2000s after being trafficked by Epstein when she was 16 and 17 years old. Andrew denied Giuffre's claims. On 12 January 2022, Judge Lewis A. Kaplan rejected Andrew's attempts to dismiss the case, allowing the sexual abuse lawsuit to proceed. On 15 February 2022, the parties reached an out-of-court settlement, which included Andrew making a substantial donation to Giuffre's charity. As part of the settlement, Andrew acknowledged that it is "known that Jeffrey Epstein trafficked countless young girls over many years" and that he "regrets his association with Epstein, and commends the bravery of Ms. Giuffre and other survivors in standing up for themselves and others". Andrew pledged to "demonstrate his regret for his association with Epstein by supporting the fight against the evils of sex trafficking, and by supporting its victims". The settlement was estimated to be as high as £12 million, part of which went to SOAR (Speak Out, Act, Reclaim), the advocacy charity for survivors of sex trafficking that Giuffre had founded.

==== Alleged attempts by Andrew and Maxwell associate to discredit Giuffre ====
In Nobody's Girl, published posthumously in October 2025, Giuffre claimed that just before the first publication of the famous photo of Andrew with Giuffre in 2011, Andrew had tried to dig up dirt for a smear campaign against her by providing her date of birth and social security number to his police protection officer, on which the officer was not said to have acted. In late 2025, the Metropolitan Police investigated these claims that Andrew asked his personal bodyguard to seek incriminating information about Giuffre in 2011 and concluded their investigation in December 2025, after a review, saying their "assessment has not revealed any additional evidence of criminal acts or misconduct".

In October 2025, The Sunday Times reported that Andrew had paid Mark Gallagher, a former ITV executive, up to £500,000 over around 15 months to aid in rehabilitating his image after the Prince Andrew & the Epstein Scandal Newsnight interview in 2019. Gallagher stepped down in February 2021 after it became known he had contacted Molly Skye Brown who had accused Giuffre of being an "enabler" for Epstein rather than a victim.

The same month, it was reported that Brian Basham, a previous spokesman for the Maxwell family, says he paid an investigator, Jay Beecher, £80,000 to investigate Giuffre. In the lead up to Maxwell's trial, between October 2020 and January 2021, an anonymous Twitter troll account had posted more than 1,200 messages and retweets critical of Giuffre. The account was described by experts as exhibiting all the traits of a troll account set up specifically to attack her.

==== UK police investigation ====
In 2026, the Metropolitan Police of the United Kingdom stated that they had interviewed Giuffre on three different occasions, but "no allegation of criminal conduct was made against any U.K.‑based individual". The Metropolitan Police said that "any investigation into human trafficking would be largely focused on activities outside the U.K. and perpetrators based overseas and therefore international authorities were best placed to progress these allegations."

=== Alan Dershowitz allegations and related lawsuits ===
Multiple defamation lawsuits were filed between Giuffre, her legal representatives, and Alan Dershowitz in a legal battle between 2014 and 2022, when all parties dropped their remaining claims.

==== Edwards and Cassell v. Dershowitz (2015) and countersuit ====
Giuffre claimed that Epstein trafficked her to lawyer and Harvard law professor emeritus Alan Dershowitz at least six times, the first when she was aged 16. He denied the claims. The claims first appeared in a 30 December 2014, Florida court filing by lawyers Bradley J. Edwards and Paul G. Cassell which alleged that Dershowitz was one of several prominent figures, including Andrew Mountbatten-Windsor, to have participated in sexual activities with a minor later identified as Giuffre. The affidavit from Giuffre was meant for inclusion as part of the 2008 lawsuit (Jane Doe v. USA) accusing the Justice Department of violating the Crime Victims' Rights Act during Epstein's first criminal case. Dershowitz vehemently denied the allegations in Giuffre's statement and sought disbarment of Edwards and Cassell, the lawyers filing the suit. Edwards and Cassell sued Dershowitz for defamation in 2015; he countersued. Dershowitz hired Louis Freeh, former director of the FBI, to investigate the matter, and in a statement in April 2016 Freeh concluded "Our investigation found no evidence to support the accusations of sexual misconduct." A few days later Edwards/Cassell and Dershowitz settled for an undisclosed financial sum, while Giuffre stood by her accusations.

==== Giuffre v. Dershowitz (2019), countersuit, and Boies v. Dershowitz ====
Following denials by Dershowitz, Giuffre said, "I'm not going to be bullied back into silence." David Boies, and Sigrid McCawley agreed to represent several of Epstein's accusers, including Giuffre, pro bono. In April 2019, Giuffre filed a federal civil defamation lawsuit against Alan Dershowitz in New York. That same month, Maria Farmer filed an affidavit in support of Giuffre's defamation suit against Dershowitz which stated that while Farmer worked signing in guests at Epstein's front desk in 1995–1996, she had regularly encountered Dershowitz at the New York mansion at times when underage girls were present. In June, Dershowitz filed a motion to dismiss Giuffre's suit (which was later denied) and a motion to disqualify Boies' firm from representing her (which was later approved). Giuffre stated in September 2019 that she continued to stand by her claims of misconduct by Dershowitz. Dershowitz accused Boies of pressuring Giuffre to provide false testimony, in response to which Boies sued Dershowitz in November 2019 for defamation.

In October 2019, Charles Cooper took over representation of Giuffre in the defamation suit against Dershowitz after a judge ruled that Boies could not continue as Giuffre's lawyer because Dershowitz's claim that she conspired with her attorneys to make false claims had turned Boies into a potential witness. On 8 November 2022, in a jointly released statement both sides agreed to drop their claims and waive the right to any appeal, with no fees awarded. Giuffre stated she "may have made a mistake" in identifying Dershowitz. Dershowitz stated his allegations that Boies was involved in an extortion plot were also "mistaken". Dershowitz further acknowledged that Giuffre "has suffered much at the hands of Jeffrey Epstein, and I commend her work combating the evil of sex trafficking."

=== Additional civil cases ===
==== Virginia Roberts affidavit (2014) ====
Giuffre filed court papers in Florida in January 2015, stating that Epstein trafficked her to Andrew Mountbatten-Windsor and Alan Dershowitz. In a sworn affidavit, she claimed Maxwell worked as Epstein's madam. In April 2015, a federal judge ruled that Giuffre could not join the federal Crime Victims' Rights Act lawsuit, and her affidavit was stricken from the case.

==== Virginia Giuffre v. Ghislaine Maxwell (2015) ====
As a result of Giuffre's allegations and Maxwell's comments about them, Giuffre sued Maxwell for defamation in federal court in New York in September 2015. After much legal confrontation, the case was settled under seal in June 2017 with Maxwell reportedly paying Giuffre "millions". On 8 January 2024, the court unsealed documents related to this lawsuit, totaling 4,553 pages and revealing the names of over 150 people connected to Epstein.

==== Rina Oh v. Virginia Giuffre (2021) ====
Rina Oh sued Giuffre for defamation in October 2021 in Manhattan federal court, for $20 million in damages. The lawsuit referenced a series of tweets Giuffre made which accused Oh of helping traffic girls for Epstein, while Oh maintained she was a victim who had never helped traffickers. Oh acknowledged that she introduced three young women to Epstein including Marijke Chartouni, and that she had taken Giuffre shopping for a schoolgirl outfit on Epstein's orders. In 2022, in court documents, Oh accused Giuffre of touching her sexually without consent while Epstein watched, but Giuffre denied the claim. Giuffre filed a counterclaim in May 2022, alleging that Oh had cut her during sadomasochistic games done for Epstein. Oh accused Giuffre of fabricating stories in her unpublished memoir (publicly released as part Giuffre v. Maxwell), particularly her depiction of Oh as a dominatrix who engaged in violent sexual acts. Oh told The Times that "the whole thing was made up". Following Giuffre's death, lawyers said Oh's lawsuit would proceed but was on pause awaiting the appointment of an estate trustee to take the place of Giuffre.

=== Second criminal case against Epstein ===
Jeffrey Epstein was arrested on 6 July 2019, at Teterboro Airport in New Jersey and charged with sex trafficking and sex trafficking conspiracy by prosecutors with the Public Corruption Unit of the Southern District of New York. In the indictment, Epstein was accused of soliciting massages from underage girls where the activities became increasingly sexual and then of enlisting the girls to recruit other underage victims for pay. U.S. Attorney Geoffrey Berman of the U.S. District Court for the Southern District of New York appealed for other victims of Epstein to come forward. The federal indictment also listed the key role of Epstein's paid "employees and associates" responsible for scheduling victims.

One month after his arrest, Epstein was found dead on 10 August 2019, after reportedly hanging himself in his Manhattan prison cell. On 29 August 2019, the case against Epstein was closed after District Judge Richard Berman dismissed all sex trafficking charges. Judge Berman expressed support for Epstein's accusers, stating that he invited them to speak publicly at a hearing on 27 August 2019, out of "respect" for "the difficult decisions victims made to come forward". Giuffre was among the 16 women who spoke publicly at the hearing, which included Anouska De Georgiou, Sarah Ransome, Jennifer Araoz, Chauntae Davies, Courtney Wild, Theresa J. Helm, and Marijke Chartouni. At the hearing, Giuffre stated, "The reckoning must not end. It must continue. He did not act alone. We the victims know that." Prosecutors signaled that they would continue an investigation for potential co-conspirators.

=== Allegations and testimony against Jean-Luc Brunel ===
Giuffre alleged that modeling agent Jean-Luc Brunel had procured women, some of them minors, to be used for sex with Epstein and others, by promising them modeling work. She said that Epstein told her he slept with "over 1,000 Brunel girls."

Giuffre flew to Paris in January 2021 and provided testimony at a closed-door hearing on Brunel's detention. In June 2021, Giuffre returned to France and provided preliminary testimony against Brunel.

After Brunel died by suicide in 2022 in the La Santé Prison, Giuffre stated: "The suicide of Jean Luc Brunel, who abused me and countless girls and young women, ends another chapter. I am disappointed that I was not able to face him in a final trial and hold him accountable for his actions, but gratified that I was able to face him in person last year in Paris, to keep him in prison."

=== Release of Epstein Files in 2025-2026 ===
Following the passage of the Epstein Files Transparency Act in 2025, which required the release of the Epstein files, documents showed that FBI investigators found little evidence that Epstein ran a sex trafficking ring that served other powerful men. Investigators established that Giuffre was a victim of sexual abuse by Epstein, but according to Associated Press, "other parts of her story were problematic", with two other victims contradicting Giuffre's statements that they had been "lent out" to powerful men. According to a 2019 memo by investigators, she had "engaged in a continuous stream of public interviews about her allegations, many of which have included sensationalized if not demonstrably inaccurate characterizations of her experiences", including making false statements about her interactions with the FBI.

== Media appearances ==
Giuffre appeared on a special edition of Dateline NBC with Savannah Guthrie discussing the Epstein scandal along with victims Anouska De Georgiou, Rachel Benavidez, Jennifer Araoz, Marijke Chartouni and Chauntae Davies. The special, titled "Reckoning", aired on 20 September 2019. Giuffre was interviewed for a 60 Minutes Australia investigation that aired on 10 November 2019. In the program she described her experiences of being trafficked by Epstein and Maxwell to have sex with Prince Andrew three times in 2001: the first time being in London at Maxwell's Belgravia residence, the second at Epstein's New York mansion, and the final occurrence (involving multiple girls and the Prince) on Little Saint James.

Giuffre also gave an interview in October 2019 to the BBC, and described her experience of being trafficked by Epstein to Andrew for a Panorama special, "The Prince and the Epstein Scandal", which aired on 2 December 2019. In the program, Giuffre directly appealed to the public by stating, "I implore the people in the UK to stand up beside me, to help me fight this fight, to not accept this as being ok." BBC reporter Emily Maitlis conducted a Newsnight interview with Prince Andrew, discussing Giuffre's allegations and his friendship with Epstein, which aired on 16 November 2019. The reaction to the Andrew's conduct during the interview was one of overwhelming disapproval; this, combined with Giuffre's public appeal, resulted in a widespread shift in opinion by the British people. Andrew resigned from his royal duties on 20 November 2019, as a number of organizations and charities that he was connected to severed ties. Despite his promises to assist authorities, in January 2020, U.S. attorney Geoffrey Berman stated that Andrew had provided "zero cooperation" after the FBI and the Southern District of New York had requested to interview him as part of the Epstein inquiry.

Giuffre appeared, along with Maria Farmer, in a May 2020 four-part Netflix series, titled Jeffrey Epstein: Filthy Rich. It was directed by Lisa Bryant and based on the earlier book of the same name by James Patterson. In July 2020, following Maxwell's federal indictment, Giuffre was interviewed by Gayle King for CBS This Morning. Giuffre and other survivors of Epstein's sex trafficking ring were featured in the four-part documentary series Surviving Jeffrey Epstein, which premiered on 9 August 2020, on Lifetime.

== Manuscript and memoir ==
Giuffre's unpublished manuscript The Billionaire's Playboy Club became public when courts unsealed documents in 2019, and again in 2020.

Her memoir, Nobody's Girl: A Memoir of Surviving Abuse and Fighting for Justice, was co-authored with journalist Amy Wallace. Giuffre began working with Wallace on the new memoir in Spring 2021 and had completed it before her death in April 2025. Nobody's Girl is distinct from the earlier manuscript and was posthumously published by Alfred A. Knopf on 21 October 2025. Knopf stated that Nobody's Girl "was both vigorously fact-checked and legally vetted".

In 2026, Nobody's Girl received the Book of the Year award from the British Book Awards. Giuffre's memoir also earned the British Book Awards 2026 prize for Nonfiction: Narrative Book of the Year, as well as the Freedom to Publish Award which was jointly awarded to Giuffre and Sarah Wynn-Williams.

== Allegations against Giuffre ==
Epstein victim Carolyn Andriano has blamed Giuffre for recruiting her to Epstein when she was only 14 years old. Andriano recalled that Giuffre instructed her "whatever you do, don't say your age" to Epstein, and provided her with provocative clothing to meet him. According to Andriano, after she was brought to Epstein's home, Giuffre had sex with Epstein while she "sat on the couch and watched until it was finished". She also said that Giuffre later trained her how to massage Epstein in return for money, and that she would later visit the home an estimated 100 times.

In 2022, Andriano argued that Giuffre should be prosecuted similarly to Ghislaine Maxwell, stating "I don't think Virginia deserves anything less than what Maxwell is getting because she trafficked me". In a statement, Giuffre's then-lawyer, David Boies, stated "Virginia has said for years that her role in facilitating other young women's involvement is something that she has always regretted".

Andriano has also alleged that Giuffre bragged about sleeping with Andrew Mountbatten-Windsor to her, stating "she didn't seem upset about it. She thought it was pretty cool".

== Personal life, health and death ==
=== Marriage ===
Following her marriage to Robert Giuffre in 2002, Virginia lived in Glenning Valley on the Central Coast, New South Wales, for 11 years. Together they had three children, two sons and a daughter. The family relocated to the United States in November 2013, initially spending time in Florida, and later in Colorado in 2015. The family moved from the US back to Cairns, Queensland, in 2017. In 2020, she moved with her family to Ocean Reef in Perth, Western Australia. The family purchased a farming property in Neergabby in August 2023 after securing the settlement from Andrew Mountbatten-Windsor. Virginia and her husband reportedly separated in 2024. Some members of her family said that she had separated from Robert even earlier, in August 2023, when she first raised the subject of divorce. In April 2025, Giuffre publicly stated that her husband had physically abused her for many years. Records indicate that Robert was arrested in Colorado in 2015 and pleaded guilty to domestic violence for which he was placed on probation.

Virginia said Robert was violent again in January 2025 when the family gathered for a birthday celebration for one of the children. Robert accused Virginia of breaching a family violence restraining order in February and a court hearing was set. For several months afterward, she was prevented from seeing her children. Asked for comment by the press days after her car accident in early April 2025, she denied violating any such order and added that she would defend herself "against his malicious claim". At the time of her death, she had been in a custody battle for her three children with Robert, with whom she was undergoing a divorce.

=== Political views ===
According to Giuffre's ghost writer Amy Wallace, she was a "huge" fan of Donald Trump, largely due to his promise to release the Epstein Files. Giuffre reportedly felt that Trump was "kind to her", and did not implicate him in any allegations of abuse.

=== Health ===
Giuffre suspected she was treated in 2001 by laparoscopic surgery for an ectopic pregnancy after Epstein took her to the hospital when she experienced sharp abdominal pain and irregular bleeding. In her memoir, Giuffre wrote that she developed meningitis in 2020, was hospitalized, and then broke her neck. She had surgery to treat injuries to her spine and sternum in 2023.

==== Car accident ====
On 24 March 2025, Giuffre said she was the passenger in a car accident near Perth involving her vehicle and a school bus. Local police confirmed they had received a report of a minor crash from the bus driver the following day, but that no injuries had been reported. Her family said she went home "banged up and bruised" but was taken to hospital after her condition deteriorated. Her brothers traveled to Australia to help care for her during recovery from the car accident and renal failure. She was discharged from the hospital on 7 April 2025.

=== Death ===
External videos
- Virginia's Final Wish; 41:45 YouTube video from 60 Minutes Australia September 2025

Giuffre died by suicide at her home in Neergabby, Western Australia, on 25 April 2025, at the age of 41. Her brothers were with her in the weeks before she died.

Shortly after her death, authorities stated that "early indications" show that "the death is not suspicious". Giuffre's father alleged that "somebody got to her".

Five years before her death she had posted to Twitter saying that she was "in no way, shape or form" suicidal, and that "if something happens to me", "do not let [it] go away". Following Giuffre's death, her public representative, Dini von Mueffling, told The Times that Giuffre was suicidal at the time: "she confided in me [in the weeks before her death] that she had planned to commit suicide, down to the method." Von Mueffling encouraged Giuffre's brothers to be with her in Perth, and tried to dissuade her from suicide. According to von Mueffling, "she just couldn't take it any more. It wasn't a dramatic conversation, it was very matter of fact". Giuffre's Australia-based attorney Karrie Louden also said that her death was not suspicious.

== Charity ==
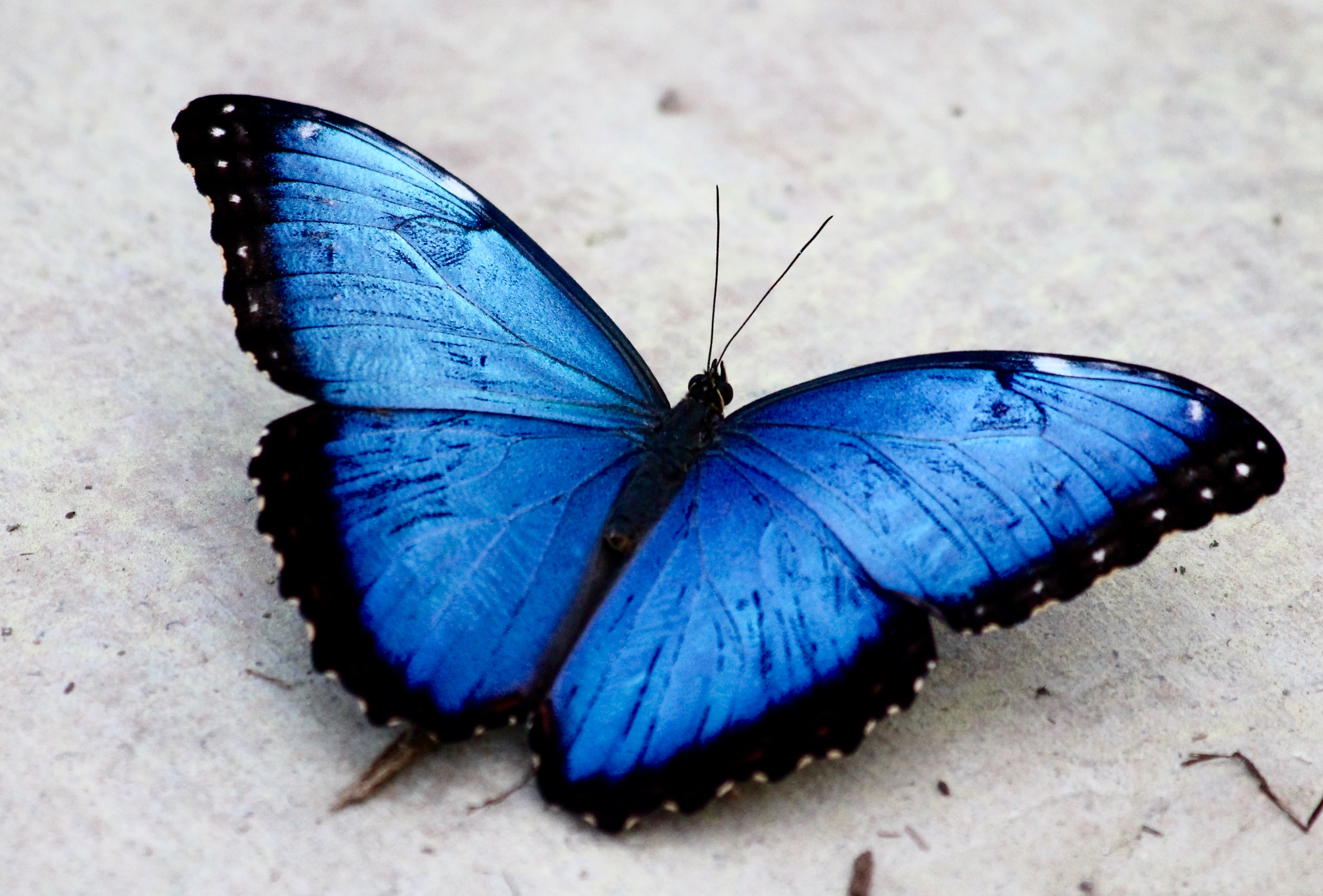
Speak Out, Act, Reclaim (SOAR) uses a blue butterfly as a symbol of transformation and empowerment for survivors of sexual abuse.

In December 2014, Giuffre set up the framework for her organization Victims Refuse Silence, a charity to help survivors of sexual abuse and sex trafficking. Bradley Edwards and Brittany Henderson assisted her with establishing Victims Refuse Silence as a 501(c)(3) non-profit organization in Fort Lauderdale, Florida in the United States. It was established as tax exempt as of 23 December 2014.

Giuffre used imagery of a blue butterfly for her organization to symbolize the transformation and empowerment that occurs when a victim becomes a survivor and because blue is the international color of human trafficking awareness.

Victims Refuse Silence did not make official tax filings after 2019 and had its non-profit status revoked in 2023. The i Paper reported that "the charity appears to have been wound down."

In November 2021, Giuffre created a website for Speak Out, Act, Reclaim (SOAR). The website stated SOAR was not accepting donations at this time. Three months later, an out-of-court settlement with Andrew Mountbatten-Windsor was announced with part of the settlement expected to go to SOAR. In 2023, Andrew was reportedly seeking to overturn the deal he struck with Giuffre. In 2026, Cahal Milmo of The i Paper relayed that a "donation of about £2m was reportedly made from funds provided by the Queen. But four years later, the status of Soar as an active charity is unclear and its royal monies appear to be in a state of limbo." Milmo added that the funds were "currently being held in a so-called escrow account – in which monies remain under the control of a third party until a specified condition or conditions have been met."

== Legacy ==
In February 2026, U.S. legislators proposed a new law to eliminate the statute of limitations for federal civil lawsuits regarding sexual abuse and trafficking, named Virginia's Law, in honor of Giuffre. Democrats in the House and Senate announced the proposal along with members of Giuffre's family. Her brother Sky Roberts and his wife, Amanda, said the bill would offer survivors "the right to seek justice, no matter the status, wealth or power of the person who harmed them, and no matter when the abuse occurred." By late 2026, the law had passed neither the House nor the Senate.

== Bibliography ==
- Roberts Giuffre, Virginia (2025). Nobody's Girl: A Memoir of Surviving Abuse and Fighting for Justice. New York: Alfred A. Knopf. ISBN 978-0-593-49312-0.
