= Lownie (surname) =

Lownie is a surname. Notable people with the surname include:

- Andrew Lownie (born 1961), British historian, son of Ralph
- Ralph Lownie (1924–2007), British judge
