= Our Queen at 90 =

- Genre: Documentary film
- Written by: Robert Hardman
- Directed by: Ashley Gething
- Narrated by: Olivia Colman
- Composer: Miguel d'Oliveira
- Country of origin: United Kingdom
- Original language: English

Production
- Executive producer: Nicolas Kent
- Producers: Ashley Gething; Robert Hardman
- Editors: Paul van Dyke; Rick Aplin
- Running time: 88 minutes
- Production companies: Oxford Film and Television

Original release
- Network: ITV
- Release: 27 March 2016

Our Queen at 90 is a 2016 television documentary film made to commemorate the 90th birthday of Queen Elizabeth II. It was produced by Oxford Film and Television for ITV and directed by Ashley Gething, and narrated by Olivia Colman. The film featured contributions from Charles, Prince of Wales, Camilla, Duchess of Cornwall, Prince William, Duke of Cambridge, Catherine, Duchess of Cambridge, Prince Harry, Prince Andrew, Duke of York, Princesses Beatrice and Eugenie, Sophie, Countess of Wessex, and Peter Phillips, as well as President Barack Obama sending a birthday greeting to the Queen.

The programme, initially developed under the working title The Queen at Ninety, was announced by ITV as part of wider celebrations of the monarch's milestone birthday and included the Duchess of Cambridge's first solo television interview. Described as an intimate and nuanced portrait, the documentary presents personal insights into the Queen's life through interviews with her family, staff, and close associates. Among its revelations, it notes that Prince George refers to the Queen as "Gan-Gan" and highlights details of royal domestic life. The film also includes anecdotes about royal engagements and experiences, including instances of public reactions to the Queen and reflections from family members on her character and influence.

In a review for The Telegraph, Ben Lawrence gave the documentary four out of five stars and described Our Queen at 90 as offering "a tantalising glimpse of the real person" behind Elizabeth II, while criticising its length and lack of analytical depth.
