= Entitled: The Rise and Fall of the House of York =

2025 biography

- First edition
- Authors: Andrew Lownie
- Language: English
- Subject: Andrew Mountbatten-Windsor; Sarah Ferguson
- Publisher: HarperCollins
- Publication date: 14 August 2025
- Publication place: United Kingdom
- Media type: Print
- Pages: 448
- ISBN: 978-0-00-877545-2

Entitled: The Rise and Fall of the House of York is a biography of Andrew Mountbatten-Windsor and Sarah Ferguson by British historian Andrew Lownie.

An unauthorised biography, it was published by HarperCollins on 14 August 2025. Lownie conducted four years of research and submitted "numerous" Freedom of information requests for the book. The book also examines Andrew's links with the convicted sex offender and financier Jeffrey Epstein which HarperCollins describes as having "[begun] earlier, continued longer and were much more frequent than reported".

== Content ==
The book, the title of which alludes to the rise and fall of the medieval House of York, focuses on the public and personal lives of Andrew Mountbatten-Windsor and Sarah Ferguson. The biography, which tells the story of "a spoilt prince unable to connect and a duchess pushed by her insecurities into a desperate need to maintain the attention her 'royal' status brought," is − according to the author − based on court papers, freedom of information disclosures, interviews with ex-staffers and correspondence.

Apart from the positive statement that the prince showed authentic courage when he flew helicopters in the Falklands War and the thoughtful statement of former military comrades that behind the bright facade of the youthful sunny boy there lay a lonely and insecure soul, the book is mostly critical about Andrew, whom it portrays as short-tempered, vain, arrogant and sex obsessed. The author accuses the former Prince of "cruel" behavior towards the staff, bullying, profanities and impossible demands. According to the author, the Prince never found a way to transform his war heroism into a fulfilling civilian role, either personally or professionally.

Lownie claims Andrew and Sarah had both met Jeffrey Epstein prior to 1999, despite Andrew's claims to the contrary. He also raises the possibility of Epstein passing information on Andrew and his other high-profile friends to Russia, Mossad, Saudi Arabian authorities and Muammar Gaddafi's Libyan intelligence services. Included in these references to Jeffrey Epstein was the claim he had an intimate relationship with Melania Trump (née Knauss) a year before she began dating Donald Trump. Among other topics discussed are Andrew's sexual habits, including a trip to Thailand that involved more than 10 women a day going to his hotel room over the course of his 4-day stay. Lownie also recounts an incident involving Andrew reprimanding a palace employee for not using the proper name and title when referring to his grandmother Queen Elizabeth the Queen Mother and calling him a "fucking imbecile". Another employee recounted how he would "explode one minute and then try to take it back the next." Also discussed within the book are Sarah's excessive spending habits, her debts and failed ventures.

In the book, Lownie alleges that Andrew's father Prince Philip had an affair with Sarah's mother Susan Barrantes, later citing on a TV programme his mother-in-law, whom he claimed was a friend of Barrantes, as the source. The book also claims that Prince Harry, Duke of Sussex punched Andrew at a family gathering in 2013 over comments that Andrew had made about him "behind his back" and that Andrew had disparaged Harry and his wife Meghan's relationship in 2017. A spokesperson for Harry subsequently stated that Harry and Andrew "have never had a physical fight, nor did Andrew ever make the comments he is alleged to have made about the Duchess of Sussex to Prince Harry".

As Britain's Special Representative for International Trade and Investment from 2001 to 2011, Andrew, according to Lownie, was not afraid to ask for gifts at meetings with heads of state and government from Azerbaijan, Libya, and Tunisia, including, on one occasion, a Fabergé egg. Above all, Lownie describes how, in his opinion, "The Firm" covered things up out of a misguided sense of loyalty over any accountability.

In its initial publication, the book claimed that Melania Trump was introduced to Donald Trump through Epstein. HarperCollins has removed those passages and recalled approximately 60,000 copies of the book that contain those passages, issuing an apology to Melania Trump.

In an updated paperback edition, Lownie alleges that Sarah had a secret "friends with benefits" relationship with P. Diddy starting in 2004 and the two would meet in luxury hotels, including one that cost more than £50,000 a night. P. Diddy is also alleged to have said "he could not wait until Fergie's daughters come of age"; he was allegedly introduced to Eugenie at a yacht party when she was 16. The book also alleged that the two had met at a 2002 party thrown by Ghislaine Maxwell, although Lownie later stated on a podcast that there were pictures of Sarah at P. Diddy's party in 1998, suggesting that the two could have met earlier. The book also claims that a men's fragrance called Unforgivable, released by Combs in 2006, was inspired by Sarah's preference for how men should smell. The new edition also contains the allegation that during a shooting weekend at Sandringham, Andrew reportedly kicked a Labrador in the head after it grabbed a sausage roll from a guest, leaving the dog whimpering on the ground. This prompted Prince Philip to tell the guest "Andrew needs a good scolding from time to time".

== Reception ==
The prevailing tone in most comments was that the biography essentially confirmed and reinforced all the assessments and impressions that had long been circulating about Andrew in the public anyway, which is why journalists mainly focused on the details of the Epstein connection. Kate Mansey, assistant editor of The Times, called the book "a 400-page character assassination" and described the deep dive into Andrew's relationship with Epstein as the most "disturbing" part. Writing for The Independent, Harry Mount argued that "the intensely private and upsetting revelations in a new biography cannot be the start of a public rehabilitation" for Andrew who came off as stupid, entitled and self-indulgent in the book.

In his programme on GB News with Lownie as guest, Conservative commentator Jacob Rees-Mogg described the book as a "hatchet job" and its claims "salacious gossip" and questioned the reliability of Lownie's sources, in response to which the author said he had interviewed 300 people.

In his review for The Telegraph, Christopher Howse gave the book two out of five stars and similarly called into question various claims made within it, including the allegation that Andrew had slept with half a dozen women before turning 13. He argued that "excess is the motif of Entitled," with the deadly sins of lust and avarice attributed to Andrew, and binge eating and spending sprees to Sarah, but the book failed to "get to the bottom of the psychology of the Duke of York."
