= 1988 royal tour of California =

British royal visit to the United States

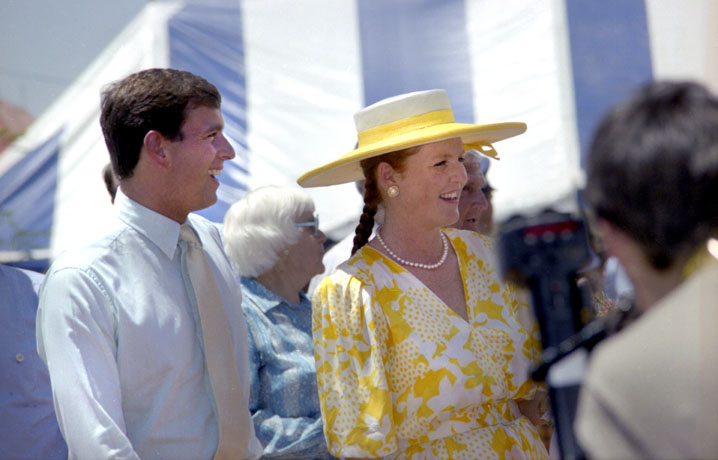
The Duke and Duchess of York in 1988

Prince Andrew, Duke of York (later Andrew Mountbatten-Windsor), and Sarah, Duchess of York (later Sarah Ferguson), toured the U.S. state of California between 26 February and 7 March 1988. The couple's impending visit was announced at a news conference and breakfast at The Biltmore Los Angeles hotel attended by actors Michael York, Stacy Keach and Judd Hirsch in January 1988. The Yorks stayed on board the British royal yacht HMY Britannia docked at Long Beach Naval Shipyard in Long Beach during their stay in California.

== Schedule ==
Andrew and Sarah made more than 40 public appearances during their 10-day tour of Southern California to promote British goods and culture in their role as patrons of the UK/LA Festival. The couple arrived in Los Angeles on 29 February to "considerable publicity and fanfare" according to United Press International (UPI). Sarah was pregnant with Princess Beatrice during the tour. Sarah was described as "ebullient" by UPI, which noted that she provided the "only unexpected glimpses of royal personality". The trip was also described as "relatively uneventful". The couple visited the University of California, Los Angeles where "female students shrieked [Andrew's] name". The couple attended a church service at St. Luke's Episcopal Church in Long Beach on Sunday, 28 February. A crowd of 300 people waited to greet them at the church. The British ambassador Antony Acland and Consul-General Donald Ballentyne and their wives were involved in a minor car accident on their way to the service. Andrew read the lesson from the Romans 8:31. Reverend A. LeRoy Young described the visit of the couple in his sermon as the "biggest thing" to have happened in Long Beach since the explosion of the Richfield Oil Corporation refinery in June 1933. Later that day Andrew and Sarah visited a David Hockney retrospective at the Los Angeles County Museum of Art before a gala dinner with 700 guests to celebrate the UK/LA Festival was held at The Biltmore Los Angeles in the evening. It was co-hosted by Lodwrick Cook and Armand Hammer, the sponsors of the festival. The master of ceremonies at the dinner was the actor Roger Moore. Guests included Zsa Zsa Gabor and Prince Frederic von Anhalt, as well as actors Joan Collins, George Hamilton, and Michael York. The California state senator Art Torres shouted "I love you, Fergie". He was reported to be drunk. Sarah called back "I'll see you later".

On 1 March Andrew and Sarah visited the Academy of Motion Picture Arts and Sciences where they met various personalities and actors including Pierce Brosnan, Joseph Cotten, Robin Leach, Jack Lemmon, Roddy McDowall, Roger Moore, Jack Nicholson, and Vincent Price. Lemmon said of Andrew and Sarah that "For them it was like doing a scene over and over about 100 times ... It is such a gruelling schedule for them. They couldn't have been more charming". They then visited Showscan, a special effects film studio in Culver City. Sarah was presented with a bunch of flowers by the robot Number 5 from the 1986 film Short Circuit upon her arrival at Showscan. Number 5 then complimented Sarah on her hat.

At Showscan Andrew rode on a "two-minute film-and-motion simulated thrill-ride on a roller coaster" before signalling 'no' to Sarah as she was pregnant. Sarah told the operator of the ride to "Take him for a real spin ... nice and fast ... a bit of action". Sarah also had the opportunity to hit Andrew over the head with a resin whiskey bottle. Sarah asked "That's what you've been waiting for me to do, isn't it?" before calling over her private secretary Lt. Col. Sean O'Dwyer who obliged to have the bottle broken on his head. Sarah asked him if it hurt to which he replied "It's quite all right". Writing in The Washington Post, Patt Morrison wrote "If Southern Californians have spent four days pressing their noses against the glass cordon of royal fantasy, Tuesday was the royals' turn to marvel at the fantasy that movie wizards dish out". The couple then attended a luncheon at the Bel Air Hotel hosted by British Academy of Film and Television Arts (BAFTA). There were speeches from Anjelica Huston and Dudley Moore.

On 3 March Andrew and Sarah visited Park Century School in Los Angeles in a visit hosted by the actress Joan Collins and the International Foundation for Learning Disabilities. In the afternoon the couple were flown by helicopter to the USS Nimitz. On board the Nimitz they saw the electrical catapults and anchors of the ship. Sarah was given a boatswain's mate's whistle which she "playfully tooted on" as she and Andrew travelled on the ship's aircraft elevator to the flight deck. The couple then witnessed a flyby display of supersonic jets and several landings as well as anti-submarine warfare techniques from helicopters. The couple were provided with a commentary by the commander of U.S. Naval Air Forces Pacific, Vice Admiral John H. Fetterman Jr., and the Nimitz's Commanding Officer, Brent Bennitt. Andrew and Sarah were given US Navy flight jackets inscribed with their titles.

On 4 March the couple visited the headquarters of Occidental Petroleum on Wilshire Boulevard in Los Angeles to view works from company chairman Armand Hammer's private art collection. At Occidental Petroleum they met the Mayor of Los Angeles Tom Bradley, Jeanne Phillips and Jerry Weintraub. Later that day the couple visited the University of California, Los Angeles where Sarah was perplexed by "Off the Beaten Track" a sculpture by the Scottish artist David Mach consisting of a "20-by-10-foot cargo bin" that appeared to be supported by 600 Barbie and Ken dolls. The piece was intended as a satire of consumerism. Sarah asked what the piece was "incredulously" before saying "Oh, art". At UCLA they saw a sculpture of the university's Joe Bruin mascot and visited the Jules Stein Eye Institute. The couple were also given a gift of historic newsreel footage of the British royal family.

Andrew and Sarah spent two days as guests of the former American Ambassador to the United Kingdom, Walter Annenberg in Palm Springs, California. The couple attended a polo match at the Eldorado Polo Club in Palm Springs to raise funds for the rebuilding of Shakespeare's Globe in Southwark on the South Bank in London. Sarah's father Ronald Ferguson was captain of the Windsor Park team at the match. They departed from Palm Springs International Airport for London on 7 March.
