= Charles III: The Coronation Year =

2023 British television programme

- Genre: Documentary film
- Written by: Robert Hardman
- Directed by: Ashley Gething
- Narrated by: Helena Bonham Carter
- Composers: Tom Kelly; Anne Nikitin
- Country of origin: United Kingdom
- Original language: English

Production
- Executive producer: Nicolas Kent
- Producer: Faye Hamilton
- Editors: Graeme Dawson; Simon Young
- Running time: 90 minutes
- Production company: BBC Studios

Original release
- Network: BBC One
- Release: 26 December 2023

Charles III: The Coronation Year is a 2023 television documentary film following King Charles III and Queen Camilla throughout the first year of their reign. The film was broadcast on BBC One and BBC iPlayer on 26 December 2023.

It was written by the historian Robert Hardman and narrated by Helena Bonham Carter.

== Content ==
Princess Anne speaks in the film of her "sense of relief" as the crown was taken off her mother's coffin during her funeral, symbolising the culmination of her years of royal duty. She also spoke of her mother's fears of difficulty if she was to die at Balmoral Castle, with Anne saying that "We did try and persuade her that that shouldn't be part of the decision-making process ... I hope she felt that that was right in the end, because I think we did".

Cameras captured the nervous rehearsals and the emotion of friends and family as they followed the King and Queen as they prepared for Coronation Day. The King and Queen are also seen joking and laughing during rehearsals, with the Archbishop of Canterbury, Justin Welby, forgetting the wording of a prayer and Prince William joking with Charles about his "sausage fingers" as he struggles to tie a ceremonial robe.

== Reception ==
The programme aired on Boxing Day and drew an audience of 4.82 million.

Reviewing the film for BBC News ahead of its broadcast, Sean Coughlan wrote that "It is a warm and sympathetic account of the new reign, with no glimpses of any difficult headlines from the year, whether about Prince Harry, Prince Andrew, a palace race row or protesters arrested at the Coronation. But it shows the King and Queen as a couple strengthened by each other, starting a busy new stage in their lives when most people of their age would be ready to put up their feet".

Awarding it four stars out of five, James Jackson wrote in The Times: "What emerged overall was a private view of the Firm, but one that felt like the greatest plug a royal could ask for. No one could say the King hasn't earned it." In The Daily Telegraph, Anita Singh gave the programme three stars out of five, writing: "The King and Queen, to their credit, try to put everyone at ease. The documentary is an extension of this: every scene is PR-approved and stuffed with people telling us that the royal couple are marvellous. Think of it as a glossy corporate film."

However, the BBC received almost 900 complaints about the programme. This represented over a third of the "stage one" complaints received by the BBC from 18 to 31 December. In summary, the BBC said: "We received complaints from some viewers who felt the tone of the programme was overly positive." Another reason cited for the complaints was "bias in favour of the monarchy"; the documentary was written by royal author Robert Hardman. Graham Smith of Republic wrote of the programme in The National that "this wasn't a documentary at all, but a PR film that had no journalistic integrity and little entertainment value."
