= The Mountbattens: Their Lives and Loves =

2019 biography

- First edition
- Authors: Andrew Lownie
- Language: English
- Subject: Lord Mountbatten; Lady Mountbatten
- Publisher: Blink Publishing
- Publication date: 22 August 2019
- Publication place: United Kingdom
- Media type: Print
- Pages: 490
- ISBN: 978-1788702560

The Mountbattens: Their Lives and Loves is a biography of Lord Mountbatten and Lady Mountbatten by historical writer Andrew Lownie. While researching for his book on the Mountbattens, Lownie found himself blocked by the Cabinet Office and University of Southampton, despite public money being used in 2011 to acquire their archive to "ensure public access".

== Content ==
In the book Lownie touches upon several aspects of the Mountbattens' lives. Discussed in one part is the intervention of Queen Elizabeth II to dissuade Mountbatten from plotting against the crisis-stricken Labour government of Harold Wilson to become leader of a government of national salvation. Lownie also wrote that the United States Federal Bureau of Investigation (FBI) maintained files regarding Mountbatten's alleged homosexuality. He had previously interviewed several young men who claimed to have been in a relationship with Mountbatten. John Barratt, Mountbatten's personal and private secretary for 20 years, said Mountbatten was not a homosexual, and that it would have been impossible for such a fact to have been hidden from him.

Also discussed within the book are Lord Mountbatten's chequered naval career, and Lady Mountbatten's desire for independence, which she sought it in wartime nursing, world travel and affairs. The couple's affairs are discussed in detail, including Lady Mountbatten's alleged relationship with the Indian prime minister Jawaharlal Nehru. Lownie also talks about the numerous relationships Lord Mountbatten had, both before and following his wife's demise, including with his goddaughter Sacha Abercorn who was 46 years his junior.

== Reception ==
Writing for The Guardian, Alexander Larman described the book as an "intelligent and painstakingly researched dual account of Louis and Edwina Mountbatten". Michelle Ruiz of The New York Times wrote that the book is "most compelling as a strangely sweet tale of open marriage" and argued that aspects of the book discussing Lady Mountbatten saves it "from being a mere record of [Lord Mountbatten's] military blotter." Richard Davenport-Hines wrote in The Times that the book details how the couple benefited from "aggressive social climbing" and Lownie "writes with a determination and bounce that befits his subject", though the "later chapters are a little ragged". Also writing for The Times, Ysenda Maxtone Graham found the biography to be an "incisive book that nails Mountbatten's vanity as well as his greatness".
