= Stalin's Englishman =

Biography of Guy Burgess

- Author: Andrew Lownie
- Language: English
- Publisher: Hodder & Stoughton
- Publication date: 2015
- ISBN: 1473627362

Stalin's Englishman: The Lives of Guy Burgess is a biography of the Soviet spy Guy Burgess by historian Andrew Lownie.

The biography began as a dissertation submitted by Lownie for his doctorate at the University of Edinburgh.

== Reception ==
This biography is considered to be the first of Burgess that understood the role that he played as one of the Cambridge Five. Stalin's Englishman received positive reviews in The Times, The Daily Telegraph, and The Guardian. "Burgess", wrote Richard Norton-Taylor in The Guardian, "charming and often drunk, was a much more dangerous and effective spy than has been assumed."

The Times review commented: "He was also the most ruthless of the Soviet spies active in England before 1951, and every bit as destructive as Kim Philby." The Times described it as "one of the great biographies of 2015."

Lownie's work demonstrated that, far from being the least important of the Cambridge Five, Burgess was perhaps the most interesting, most complicated, and most influential of the five.

Through interviews with more than a hundred people who knew Burgess personally, many of whom have never spoken about him before, and the discovery of hitherto secret files, Stalin's Englishman brilliantly unravels the many lives of Guy Burgess in all their intriguing, chilling, colourful, tragi-comic wonder." The Daily Telegraph

Writing in the English Historical Review in October 2017, Matthew Hughes described Lownie's biography as a "labour-of-love [...], a cracking read, rich with archival detail and interviews with those who knew Burgess. Lownie throws up three central questions: why did Burgess spy for the USSR, why did the British establishment not see him for what he was and how much damage did he do?"

== Literary prizes ==
- Guardian Book of the Year
- The Times Best Biography of the Year
- Mail on Sunday Biography of the Year
- Daily Mail Biography of Year
- Spectator Book of the Year
- BBC History Book of the Year
