= Elizabeth II: In Private. In Public. The Inside Story =

2026 biography by Robert Hardman

- First edition
- Author: Robert Hardman
- Language: English
- Subject: Elizabeth II
- Genre: Biography
- Publisher: Macmillan
- Publication date: 9 April 2026
- Publication place: United Kingdom
- Media type: Print
- Pages: 448
- ISBN: 978-1035097302

Elizabeth II: In Private. In Public. The Inside Story is a 2026 biography by Robert Hardman. It examines the life and reign of Elizabeth II, drawing on accounts from members of the British royal family. The book is Hardman's fourth biography about the Queen after Queen of Our Times: The Life of Elizabeth II (2022).

== Content ==
The book reports that William, Prince of Wales contacted Prince Andrew, Duke of York after his titles were removed. It also describes events surrounding the end of Boris Johnson's premiership, stating that the Queen's private secretary advised her not to speak to him as ministers resigned. Hardman also includes an incident in which Andrew physically attacked a palace aide after being told he could not use Buckingham Palace for an event on a particular day.

Hardman discusses the aftermath of the death of Diana, Princess of Wales, the role of the press, and the Queen's concern for her grandsons. He also recounts the Queen's final months, including her wish that her great-grandchildren visit her at Balmoral during the summer of 2022 so they would have "a really happy memory" of her. He also writes that President Donald Trump keeps a duplicate of a portrait of Elizabeth II by Basia Kaczmarowska-Hamilton at Mar-a-Lago, intended as a "permanent reminder" of the Queen.

== Reception ==
The Daily Telegraph gave the book five stars and called it "meticulously researched and flush with revelations". The Times described the book as a continuation of Hardman's earlier work on the Queen's life, praising his "historian's instincts" and its brisk, insightful narrative, which uses her reign to survey wider social and political change.
