= Traitor King: The Scandalous Exile of the Duke and Duchess of Windsor =

2021 biography

- First edition
- Authors: Andrew Lownie
- Language: English
- Subject: Prince Edward, Duke of Windsor; Wallis, Duchess of Windsor
- Publisher: Bonnier Books
- Publication date: 2021
- Publication place: United Kingdom
- Media type: Print
- Pages: 410
- ISBN: 978-1788704816

Traitor King: The Scandalous Exile of the Duke and Duchess of Windsor is a biography of Prince Edward, Duke of Windsor and Wallis, Duchess of Windsor by historical writer Andrew Lownie.

== Content ==
The former Edward VIII is alleged by Lownie to have been a Nazi sympathiser who gave aid and comfort to his country’s enemies before and during the Second World War. The book discusses his abdication which is portrayed as the first in a series of misjudgments, with Edward and Wallis thereafter fixated on regaining prominence. Their stay in Portugal in 1940 when they came to contact with Nazi agents is also mentioned with Lownie challenging the notion that Edward's sympathies with Nazi Germany were simply shared with the aristocracy or Tory establishment as he suggests something more intentional. The author elaborates how once their ambitions were not fulfilled, their lives devolved into freeloading, snobbery and irrelevance.

== Reception ==
In his review in The Wall Street Journal, Dominic Green highlights Lownie's effort to firmly portray Edward not as a hapless pawn but as someone who flirted dangerously with Nazi sympathisers. The Times wrote that the book managed to show Edward as "the trivial, dim and useless royal" that he was. Marcus Field of The Standard stated that the book's central section is dedicated to the "shady" activities of the Windsors during the war. He also complimented Lownie on his ability to discuss financial details of the couple, which he believed showed their greed, in addition to presenting old narratives that he believed Lownie managed to make seem fresh. Rupert Christiansen of The Telegraph gave the book three out of five and stated that Lownie "rehashes a lot of silly tittle-tattle, presented uncritically and even salaciously" and Edward "emerges as simply a weak, sterile and pathetic character".
