= Special Representative for International Trade and Investment =

Former role in the UK government

The Special Representative for International Trade and Investment was a member of the British royal family who represented the Sovereign for UK Trade & Investment, which at the time reported jointly to the Foreign Office and the Department for Business, Innovation and Skills. The unpaid role involved representing the United Kingdom at numerous trade fairs and conferences around the world, such as the World Economic Forum in Davos.

== Representatives ==
- The Duke of Kent had been Vice-Chairman of the British Overseas Trade Board, and later Vice-President of British Trade International and then International Trade and Investment from 1976.
- The Duke of York took over from the Duke of Kent in this role in 2001 and served until 2011.

== See also ==
- Prime Ministerial Trade Envoy
