= Phil Noble (photographer) =

English photographer

- Born: Liverpool, England
- Occupation: Photographer
- Years active: 1996–present
- Employer: Reuters
- Known for: Photograph of Andrew Mountbatten-Windsor
- Website: philnoblephoto.co.uk

Phil Noble is an English photojournalist working as a senior staff photographer for Reuters, based in Manchester. Noble is best known for a photograph he took of Andrew Mountbatten-Windsor in a car leaving police custody, after he was released from being arrested in February 2026.

== Early life and education ==
Noble was born in Liverpool. He gained an interest in photography during a secondary school work experience placement at the local newspaper, the Liverpool Echo. He later continued doing voluntary unpaid assistance to the newspaper during the school holidays. He later studied photojournalism and press photography at universities in Newport and Sheffield.

== Career ==
Noble's widely circulated photograph of Andrew leaving custody

Following his volunteering work, he became deputy picture editor at the Manchester Evening News in 1996, serving until 1998. Then from 1999 to 2006, he was a staff photographer at news agency The Press Association before becoming a senior photographer at Reuters in February 2006. He has covered the Olympic Games, Rugby and Football World Cups, World Athletics Championships, Commonwealth games and Royal tours. In 2006 he was the BG Group Sports Photographer of the Year and was a finalist in the World Sports Photography Awards in 2023.

On 19 February 2026, he took a photograph of Andrew Mountbatten-Windsor leaving a police station following his arrest earlier that day. The image of a "haunted, shell-shocked" Andrew slumped in the back seat of a car appeared on many newspaper front pages and in other media worldwide. Noble told the BBC that while the photograph was not one of his best, it was one of his most important. While the photo certainly elevated his reputation, according to Belgian media lawyer Leo Neels it is unclear if Noble would become wealthy off of the copyright to the photo, as the common law model would grant more power to the employer to profit from the copyright. The political campaign group Everyone Hates Elon hung a framed copy of the photograph in the Louvre museum in Paris, labelling it "He's Sweating Now". Museum staff removed the photo after fifteen minutes.
