= International Trade and Investment =

The International Trade and Investment Directorate is a directorate of the Scottish Government. The main areas of responsibility of the directorate are the internationalisation of the economy of Scotland and maximising the value of the food and drink industry sector of the Scottish economy.

The directorate is responsible for setting policy relating to trade, capital and foreign investment, and food and drink sectoral policy.

== Composition ==
=== Ministers ===
- Angus Robertson, Cabinet Secretary for the Constitution, External Affairs and Culture
- Richard Lochhead, Minister for Business

=== Management of the board ===
- Liz Ditchburn, Director-General of Economy

== See also ==
- Economy of Scotland
- Scottish Government
- Directorates of the Scottish Government
