= Andrew Mountbatten-Windsor =

Former British prince (born 1960)

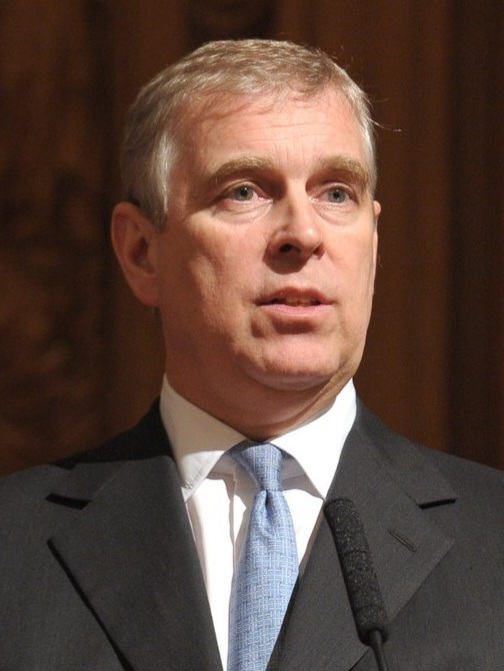
- Andrew in 2013
- Born: Prince Andrew; 19 February 1960 (age 66); Buckingham Palace, London, England
- Spouse: Sarah Ferguson (m. 1986; div. 1996)
- Children: Princess Beatrice; Princess Eugenie
- Parents: Elizabeth II; Prince Philip, Duke of Edinburgh
Names
- Andrew Albert Christian Edward Mountbatten‑Windsor
- House: Windsor

Member of the House of Lords
- Lord Temporal
- Hereditary peerage 11 February 1987 – 11 November 1999
- Military career
- Allegiance: United Kingdom
- Branch: Royal Navy
- Service years: 1979–2001
- Rank: Commander
- Conflict: Falklands War

Andrew Albert Christian Edward Mountbatten-Windsor (born 19 February 1960), formerly Prince Andrew, Duke of York, is the third child and second son of Queen Elizabeth II and Prince Philip, Duke of Edinburgh, and a younger brother of King Charles III. Andrew was born second in the line of succession to the British throne and is eighth as of 2026.

Serving in the Royal Navy from 1979 to 2001, Andrew saw active duty as a helicopter pilot during the Falklands War; he later became a helicopter instructor and commanded a warship. He married Sarah Ferguson in 1986, and was created Duke of York on their wedding day. They had two daughters, Beatrice and Eugenie, before separating in 1992 and divorcing in 1996. From 2001 to 2011, Andrew served as the UK's Special Representative for International Trade and Investment, but resigned following scrutiny of his expenses and associations with controversial figures. He continued to undertake official duties on behalf of Elizabeth II until 2019.

Andrew had a long-standing association with the American financier and child sex offender Jeffrey Epstein. In 2014, Virginia Giuffre said that she had been sex trafficked to Andrew by Epstein and Ghislaine Maxwell. Andrew denied any wrongdoing, and in 2022 settled a civil lawsuit with Giuffre in the United States without admission of liability. In the same year, Elizabeth II removed his military affiliations and patronages, and he ceased using the style "Royal Highness". In 2025, Charles III removed Andrew's remaining royal styles and honours, and restricted his use of titles and peerages. He vacated Royal Lodge, part of the Crown Estate, and relocated to private accommodation on the Sandringham estate. Following the release of more Epstein files in early 2026, Andrew was arrested on suspicion of misconduct in public office and was later released under investigation.

== Early life ==
During a 45-day tour of Canada in June and July 1959, Queen Elizabeth II discovered that she was pregnant. After her return to London, Buckingham Palace announced on 7 August that she would not undertake further public engagements, a customary indication of royal pregnancy. Andrew was born a prince of the United Kingdom at 3:30 pm on 19 February 1960 at Buckingham Palace, the third child and second son of Queen Elizabeth II and Prince Philip, Duke of Edinburgh. He was christened Andrew Albert Christian Edward in the Music Room at the palace on 8 April.

Andrew was the first child born to a reigning British monarch since Princess Beatrice, the youngest daughter of Queen Victoria, in 1857. Like his siblings, Charles, Anne and Edward, he was looked after by a governess, who oversaw his early education at Buckingham Palace. He later attended Heatherdown School near Ascot in Berkshire. In September 1973, he entered Gordonstoun in Moray, which his father and elder brother had also attended. He was nicknamed "the Sniggerer" by his schoolmates at Gordonstoun, because of "his penchant for off-colour jokes, at which he laughed inordinately". While there, he spent six months – from January to June 1977 – participating in an exchange programme at Lakefield College School in Canada. He left Gordonstoun in July 1979 with A-levels in English, history, and economics.

== Naval military service ==
=== Training ===
The Royal Household announced in November 1978 that Andrew would join the Royal Navy the following year. In December, he underwent a series of sporting tests and examinations at the Aircrew Selection Centre, at RAF Biggin Hill, followed by further tests and interviews at HMS Daedalus and the Admiralty Interview Board, HMS Sultan. During March and April 1979, he was enrolled at the Royal Naval College Flight for pilot training, after which he was accepted as a trainee helicopter pilot and signed on for 12 years from 11 May 1979. On 1 September that year, Andrew was appointed a midshipman and entered Britannia Royal Naval College, Dartmouth. He also completed the Royal Marines All Arms Commando Course in 1979, for which he received his green beret. He was commissioned as a sub-lieutenant on 1 September 1981 and appointed to the Trained Strength on 22 October.

After passing out from Dartmouth, Andrew undertook elementary flying training with the Royal Air Force at RAF Leeming, followed by basic flying training with the navy at HMS Seahawk, where he learned to fly the Gazelle helicopter. After being awarded his wings, he progressed to advanced training on the Sea King helicopter and carried out operational flying training until 1982. He subsequently joined 820 Naval Air Squadron on the aircraft carrier HMS Invincible.

=== Falklands War ===
On 2 April 1982, Argentina invaded the Falkland Islands, a British Overseas Territory administered by the United Kingdom and claimed by Argentina, triggering the Falklands War. Invincible was one of only two operational aircraft carriers available to the Royal Navy and therefore played a major role in the task force assembled to retake the islands.

Andrew's presence on board, and the risk of a royal family member being killed in action, made the British government apprehensive, and the Cabinet sought to move him to a desk role for the duration of the conflict. The Queen, however, insisted that her son remain with his ship. Andrew served on Invincible as a Sea King helicopter co-pilot, flying missions that included anti-submarine and anti-surface warfare, Exocet missile decoy operations, casualty evacuation, transport, and search and air rescue. He witnessed the Argentine attack on SS Atlantic Conveyor.

At the end of the war, Invincible returned to Portsmouth, where Elizabeth and Philip joined other families of the crew in welcoming the vessel home. According to historian Andrew Lownie, the Argentine military government planned, but ultimately did not attempt, to assassinate Andrew on Mustique in July 1982. Although he had brief assignments to HMS Illustrious, RNAS Culdrose, and the School of Service Intelligence, Andrew remained with Invincible until 1983. Commander Nigel Ward's memoir Sea Harrier Over the Falklands described Andrew as "an excellent pilot and a very promising officer."

=== Career officer ===
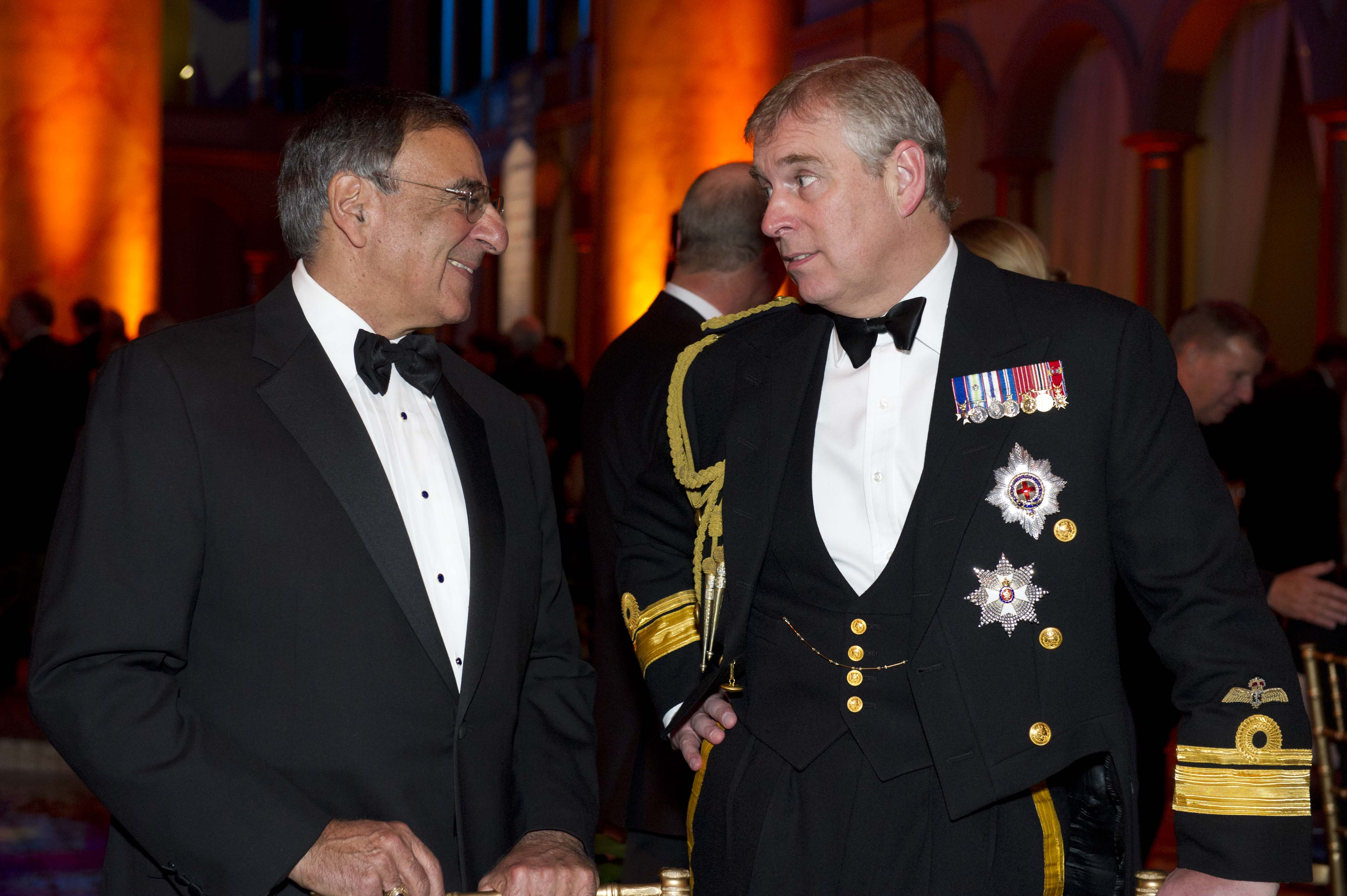
With the US secretary of defence Leon Panetta commemorating the 100th anniversary of Naval Aviation at the National Building Museum in 2011

In late 1983, Andrew transferred to RNAS Portland and was trained to fly the Lynx helicopter. On 1 February 1984, he was promoted to lieutenant, after which Elizabeth appointed him her personal aide-de-camp. Andrew served aboard HMS Brazen as a flight pilot until 1986, including deployment to the Mediterranean Sea as part of Standing NRF Maritime Group 2. He undertook the Lieutenants' Greenwich Staff course.

On 23 October 1986, he transferred to the General List and enrolled on a four-month helicopter warfare instructor's course at RNAS Yeovilton. Upon graduation, he served from February 1987 to April 1988 as a helicopter warfare officer in 702 Naval Air Squadron, RNAS Portland. He later served on HMS Edinburgh as officer of the watch and Assistant Navigating Officer until 1989, including a six-month deployment to the Far East as part of exercise Outback 88.

From 1989 to 1991, Andrew served as flight commander and pilot of the Lynx HAS3 on HMS Campbeltown. He also acted as force aviation officer to Standing NRF Maritime Group 1 while Campbeltown was flagship of the NATO force in the North Atlantic from 1990 to 1991. He passed the squadron command examination on 16 July 1991, attended the Staff College, Camberley in 1992, and completed the Army Staff course. He was promoted to lieutenant-commander on 1 February and passed the ship command examination on 12 March 1992. From 1993 to 1994, Andrew commanded the Hunt-class minehunter HMS Cottesmore.

From 1995 to 1996, Andrew was posted as senior pilot of 815 Naval Air Squadron, then the largest flying unit in the Fleet Air Arm. His main responsibility was to supervise flying standards and ensure effective operational capability. He was promoted to commander on 27 April 1999. He concluded his active naval career at the Ministry of Defence in 2001 as an officer of the Diplomatic Directorate of the Naval Staff. In July that year, Andrew was retired from the Active List of the Navy. He was made an honorary captain in 2004, promoted to rear admiral on his 50th birthday on 19 February 2010, and to vice admiral in 2015.

== Personal life ==
=== Relationships ===
==== Before marriage ====
In May 1978, the Evening News reported that Andrew had acquired the nickname "Randy Andy" (with "randy" being British slang for "sexually eager") while at Gordonstoun, owing to his being romantically involved with several women. UPI also used this nickname, stating that before beginning his naval career in 1979 he "seemed to be in training as a professional playboy". Andrew met the American photographer and actress Koo Stark in February 1981, before his active service in the Falklands War. In October 1982 they holidayed together on the island of Mustique. Tina Brown later described Stark as Andrew's only serious love interest. The couple separated in 1983 under pressure from the press and the palace. In 1997, Andrew became godfather to Stark's daughter. When Andrew faced accusations in 2015 regarding his association with Jeffrey Epstein, Stark publicly defended him.

==== Marriage and children ====
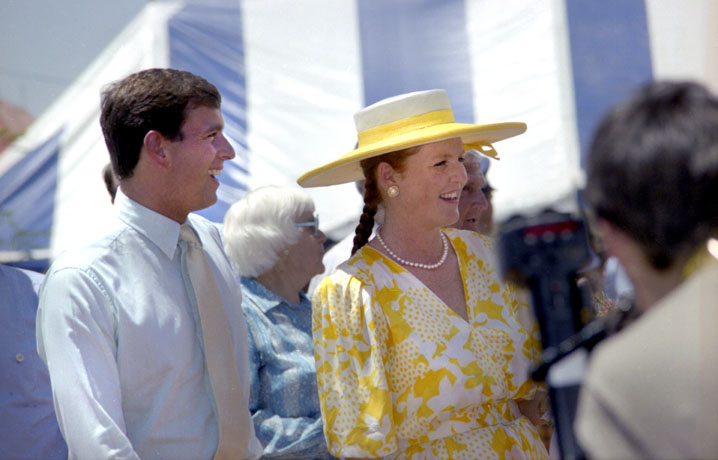
Andrew and Sarah in Townsville, Australia, 1988

Andrew married Sarah Ferguson at Westminster Abbey on 23 July 1986. On the same day, Elizabeth created him Duke of York, Earl of Inverness and Baron Killyleagh; the first two of these titles had previously been held by both his maternal grandfather, George VI, and his great-grandfather George V. Andrew had known Ferguson since childhood; they had met occasionally at polo matches and became reacquainted at Royal Ascot in 1985.

The couple initially appeared to have a happy marriage and had two daughters, Princess Beatrice (born 1988) and Princess Eugenie (born 1990), presenting a united public image during the late 1980s. Sarah's personal qualities were regarded as refreshing within the formal protocol of the royal family. Andrew's frequent travel due to his naval career, combined with relentless and often critical media attention on the Duchess of York, contributed to strains in the marriage.

The couple made a well publicised royal tour of California in March 1988.

On 19 March 1992, the couple announced plans to separate and did so amicably. That August, tabloid newspapers published photographs of the businessman John Bryan sucking Sarah's toes, effectively ending any prospect of reconciliation. Throughout the separation, Ferguson had maintained that Bryan was her financial adviser, a claim Andrew accepted. The marriage ended in divorce on 30 May 1996. Andrew spoke warmly of his former wife in 2008, saying, "We have managed to work together to bring our children up in a way that few others have been able to and I am extremely grateful to be able to do that."

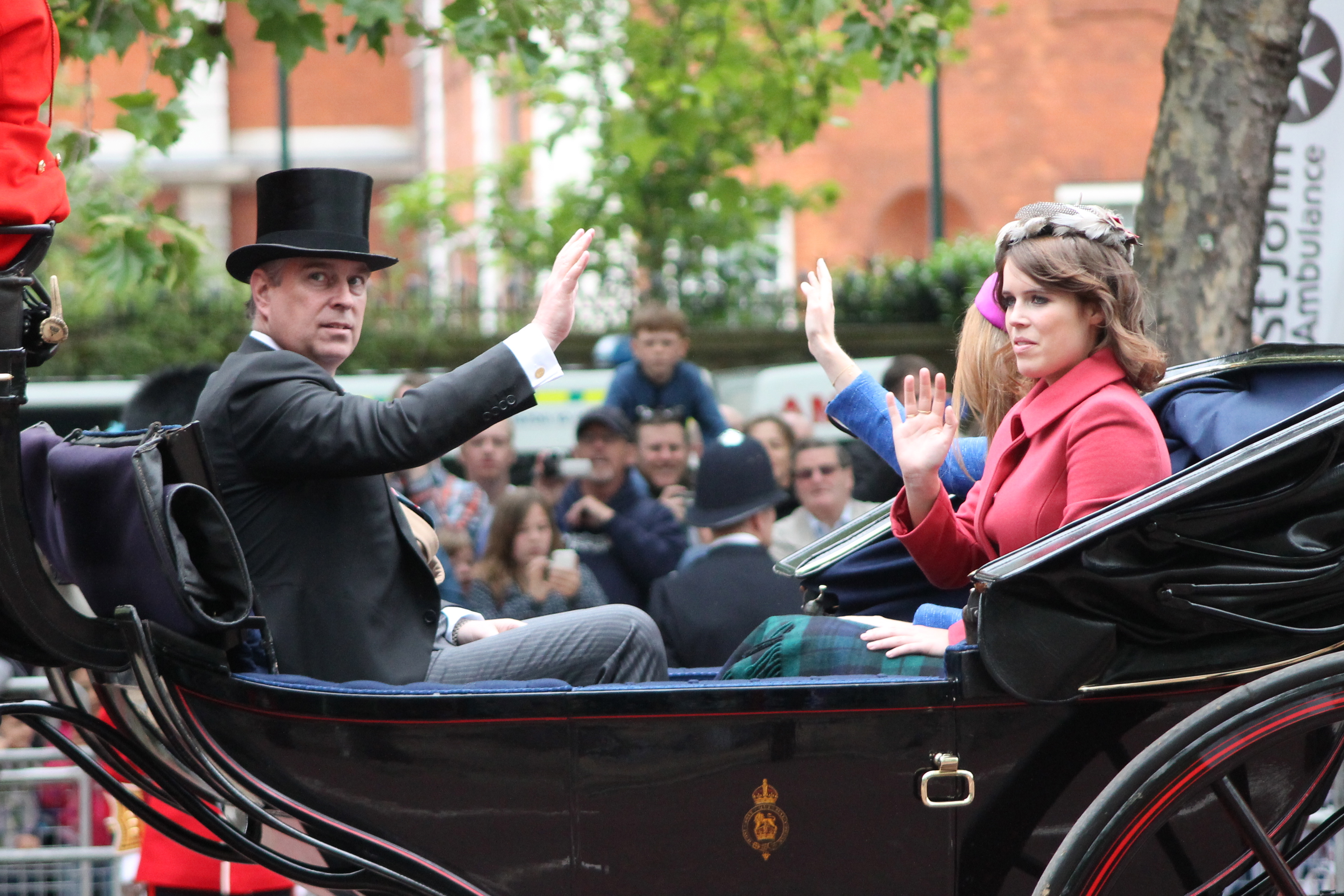
Andrew and his daughter Eugenie riding in the carriage procession at Trooping the Colour, 16 June 2012

In May 2010, Ferguson was filmed by a News of the World reporter stating that Andrew had agreed that, if she were to receive £500,000, he would meet the donor and provide useful top-level business contacts. She was filmed receiving US$40,000 in cash as a down-payment. The newspaper reported that Andrew had no knowledge of the arrangement. In July 2011, Ferguson said that her multi-million-pound debts had been cleared through the intervention of her former husband, whom she described as a "knight on a white charger".

In 2011, Ferguson said that she had made a "gigantic error of judgement" in allowing Epstein to pay off a debt for her, and apologised for accepting money from him. She nevertheless continued to defend Andrew's former friendship with Epstein. It later emerged that, following her public statement, she had sent an email to Epstein in which she referred to him as "a steadfast, generous and supreme friend".

==== Post-divorce ====
In 1999, Andrew was briefly in a relationship with Lady Victoria Hervey, who has since made a number of statements in his support.

=== Residences ===
As Andrew and Ferguson shared custody of their two daughters, the family continued to live at Sunninghill Park, which had been built for the couple near Windsor Great Park in 1990, until Andrew moved to Royal Lodge in 2004. In 2007, Ferguson moved into Dolphin House in Englefield Green, less than a mile from Royal Lodge. A fire at Dolphin House in 2008 led her to move into Royal Lodge, once again sharing a home with Andrew.

Andrew's lease of Royal Lodge was for 75 years, held from the Crown Estate, with a single £1 million premium and a commitment to spend £7.5 million on refurbishment. In March 2023, it was reported that Andrew had been offered Frogmore Cottage after his nephew Prince Harry was asked to vacate the residence. The offer came amid reports that Andrew could no longer afford the running costs of Royal Lodge, as he was due to lose his annual grant. In June 2026, it was revealed in a National Audit Office report that Andrew had received an undisclosed amount of rental income from sub‑letting three cottages on the Royal Lodge estate.

In October 2025, it was reported that Andrew had paid a peppercorn rent for the Royal Lodge lease in exchange for upfront payments totalling £8.5 million, with the agreement entitling him and his family to reside at the property until 2078. Later that month, Buckingham Palace announced that formal notice had been served to surrender the lease. The Crown Estate later clarified that Andrew "will not be owed any compensation for early surrender of the lease ... once dilapidations are taken into account". On 2 February 2026, Andrew left Royal Lodge and moved temporarily to Wood Farm on the Sandringham estate while his future accommodation underwent renovation. He relocated to Marsh Farm in April 2026. Both properties are located on the Sandringham estate, which is privately owned by the King. In October 2026, it was reported that Andrew had been entitled to £302,000 in compensation following the official surrender of the Royal Lodge lease, which ended more than 50 years before its scheduled expiry and within the first 25 years of the lease, making him eligible for compensation under its terms. However, the property incurred £1.8 million in repair and restoration costs, which exceeded the compensation due. The £302,000 was deducted from the repair bill, leaving £1.5 million payable to the Crown Estate that was provided by the King from his own private funds.

Andrew is a keen skier, and in 2014 he bought a chalet in Verbier, Switzerland, for £13 million, jointly with his ex-wife. In May 2020, it was reported that they were in a legal dispute over the mortgage. To purchase the property, they had secured a loan of £13.25 million and were expected to pay £5 million in cash instalments which, with interest, totalled £6.8 million. Despite claims that the Queen would assist with the payment, a spokesperson for Andrew confirmed that she "will not be stepping in to settle the debt".

The Times reported in September 2021 that Andrew and Ferguson had reached a legal agreement with the chalet's previous owner and would sell the property. The owner agreed to accept £3.4 million – half of what she was owed – after being informed that Andrew and Ferguson were experiencing financial difficulties. Proceeds from the sale were reportedly intended to contribute to Andrew's legal expenses in relation to the civil lawsuit with Virginia Giuffre. In June 2022, Le Temps reported that the chalet had been frozen because of a £1.6 million debt Andrew owed to unnamed individuals. Law professor Nicolas Jeandin told the newspaper, "A sale is in principle impossible, except with the agreement of the creditor."

=== Health ===
On 2 June 2022, Andrew tested positive for COVID-19, and it was announced that he would not attend the Platinum Jubilee National Service of Thanksgiving at St Paul's Cathedral on 3 June. Andrew is a teetotaller.

=== Interests ===
Andrew is a keen golfer and has held a low single-figure handicap. He served as captain of the Royal and Ancient Golf Club of St Andrews between 2003 and 2004 – during the club's 250th anniversary season – was patron of several royal golf clubs, and had been elected an honorary member of many others. In 2004, he was criticised by the Labour and Co-operative MP Ian Davidson, who, in a letter to the National Audit Office, questioned Andrew's decision to fly to St Andrews on RAF aircraft for two golfing trips. Andrew resigned his honorary membership of the Royal and Ancient Golf Club of St Andrews after the Queen removed royal patronages at several golf clubs. His honorary membership of the Royal Dornoch Golf Club was revoked the following month.

=== 2026 Sandringham incident ===
On 6 May 2026, Alex Jenkinson, a 39‑year‑old man from Suffolk, was charged by Norfolk Police with threatening and abusive behaviour after allegedly intimidating and threatening Andrew while he was out walking his dogs near his home on the Sandringham Estate. In a statement, Andrew said that he and his security detail had driven past a car he assumed belonged to press photographers, after which he saw a man wearing a balaclava who recognised him and "began to sprint after my vehicle". It was further reported that Jenkinson had allegedly researched the Princess of Wales and her children, as well as looking up weapons and methods of killing. Jenkinson is also subject to the imposition of an interim stalking protection order by Westminster Magistrates' Court.

== Charitable work ==
=== Patronages ===
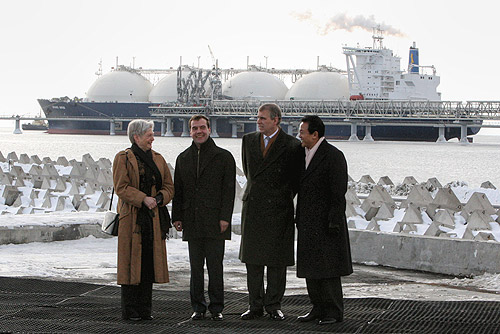
Andrew, Russian president Dmitry Medvedev, Japanese prime minister Tarō Asō, and Minister of Economic Affairs of The Netherlands Maria van der Hoeven visit the Sakhalin-II oil and gas project in the Russian Far East, 2009

Andrew was patron of the Middle East Association (MEA), the UK's premier organisation for promoting trade and good relations with the Middle East, North Africa, Turkey, and Iran. After his role as Special Representative for International Trade and Investment ended, he continued to support UK enterprise without holding a formal position. Robert Jobson wrote that Andrew carried out this work effectively, noting that "He is particularly passionate when dealing with young start-up entrepreneurs and bringing them together with successful businesses at networking and showcasing events. Andrew is direct and to the point, and his methods seem to work".

Andrew was patron of Fight for Sight, a charity dedicated to research into the prevention and treatment of blindness and eye disease, and was a member of the Scout Association. Andrew toured Canada frequently to undertake duties related to his Canadian military role. Rick Peters, former commanding officer of the Royal Highland Fusiliers of Canada, stated that Andrew was "very well informed on Canadian military methods". He became patron of the charity Attend in 2003 and served as a member of the International Advisory Board of the Royal United Services Institute. On 3 September 2012, Andrew was among a team of 40 people who abseiled down The Shard, then the tallest building in Europe, to raise money for the educational charities the Outward Bound Trust and the Royal Marines Charitable Trust Fund. He also supported organisations focused on science and technology, becoming patron of Catalyst Inc and TeenTech. In 2014, Andrew visited Geneva, Switzerland, to promote British science at CERN's 60th anniversary celebrations.

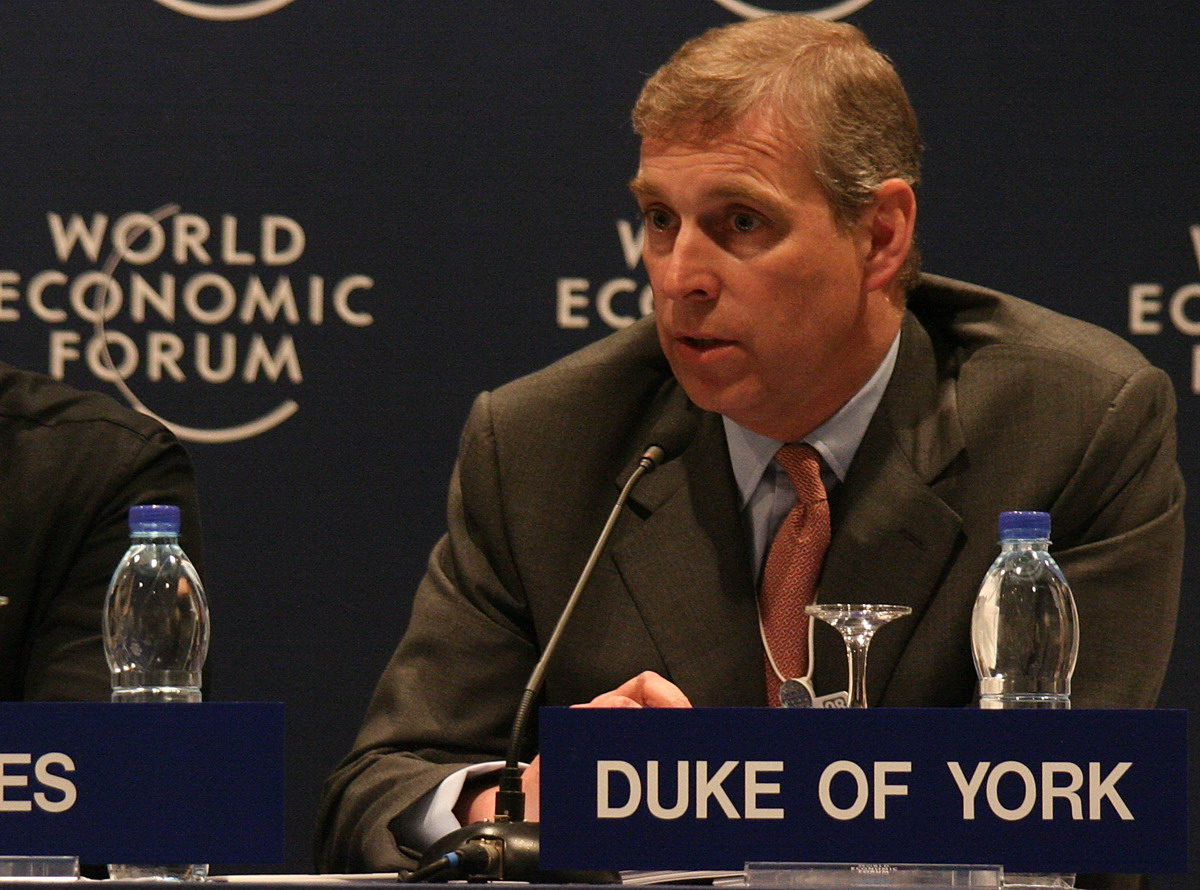
Andrew in his role as the UK's Special Representative for International Trade and Investment at the World Economic Forum on the Middle East, 2008

In 2013, it was announced that Andrew would become patron of London Metropolitan University and the University of Huddersfield. In July 2015, he was installed as Chancellor of the University of Huddersfield. In recognition of his promotion of entrepreneurship, he was elected to an Honorary Fellowship at Hughes Hall, in the University of Cambridge on 1 May 2018. On 19 November 2019, the Students' Union of the University of Huddersfield passed a motion to lobby Andrew to resign as its chancellor, while London Metropolitan University was also reviewing his role as patron. On 21 November, Andrew relinquished his role as Chancellor of the University of Huddersfield.

In March 2019, Andrew took over the patronage of the Outward Bound Trust from his father, the Duke of Edinburgh, serving until his own resignation in November 2019. Andrew had been chairman of the organisation's board of trustees since 1999. In May 2019, it was announced that Andrew had succeeded Lord Carrington as patron of the Royal Fine Art Commission Trust. On 13 January 2022, it was announced that his royal patronages had been returned to the Queen to be redistributed among other members of the royal family. In January 2023, it was reported that King Charles III had agreed that Andrew could pursue some business interests.

In July 2025, the philanthropy adviser Giving Evidence published research examining the impact of Andrew's charity patronages on the incomes of the organisations he supported prior to his retirement from public duties. The study found that revenues at roughly half of the 35 registered charities in England for which Andrew had been the sole royal patron rose after his patronage ended, while revenues at the other half fell. Researchers then compared the 35 charities with others across the country and found "no material differences in revenue patterns when Andrew's patronages ceased". This and earlier studies supported the conclusion that having a royal patron did not significantly affect charities' incomes.

=== Initiatives ===
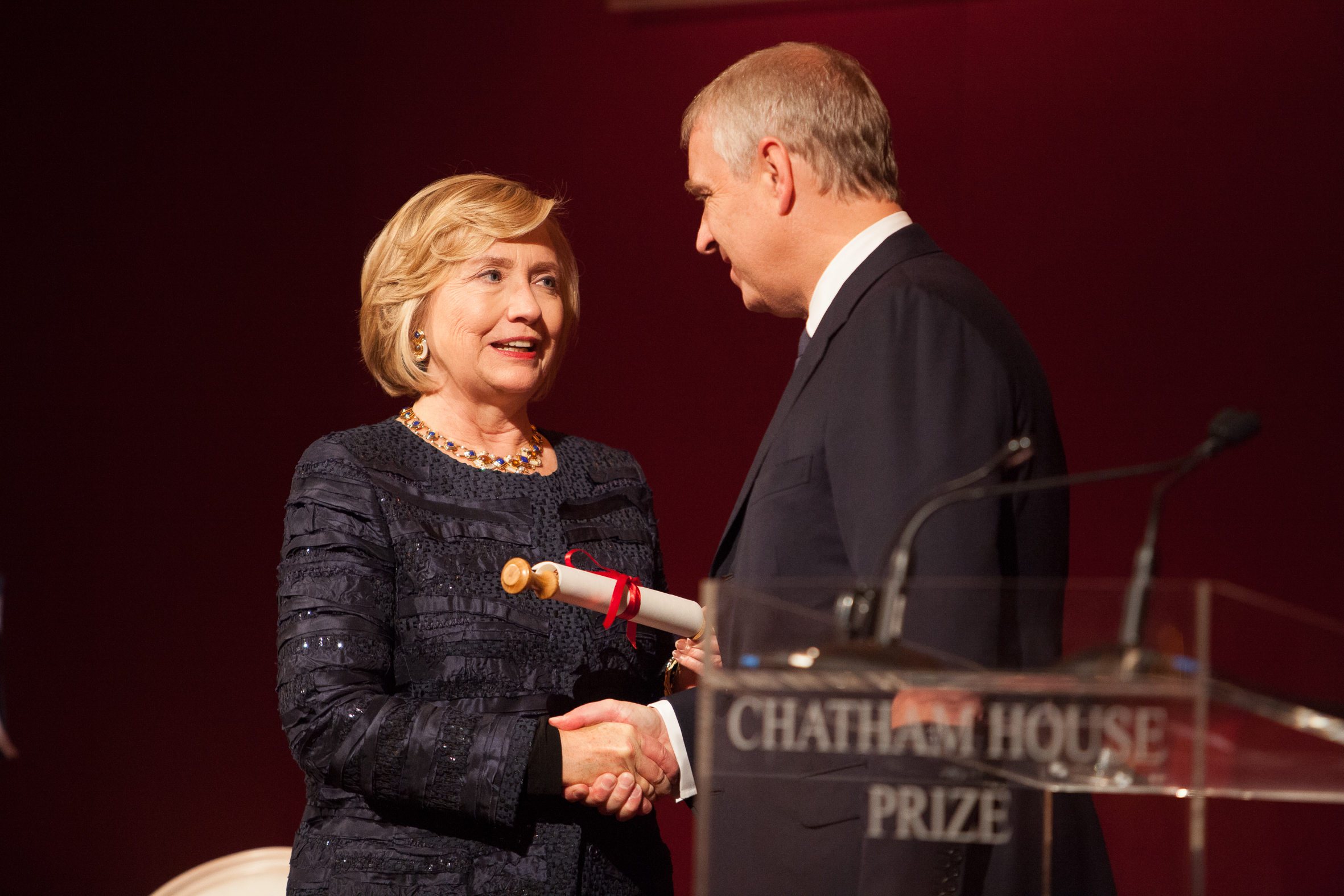
Hillary Clinton being presented with the 2013 Chatham House Prize by Andrew

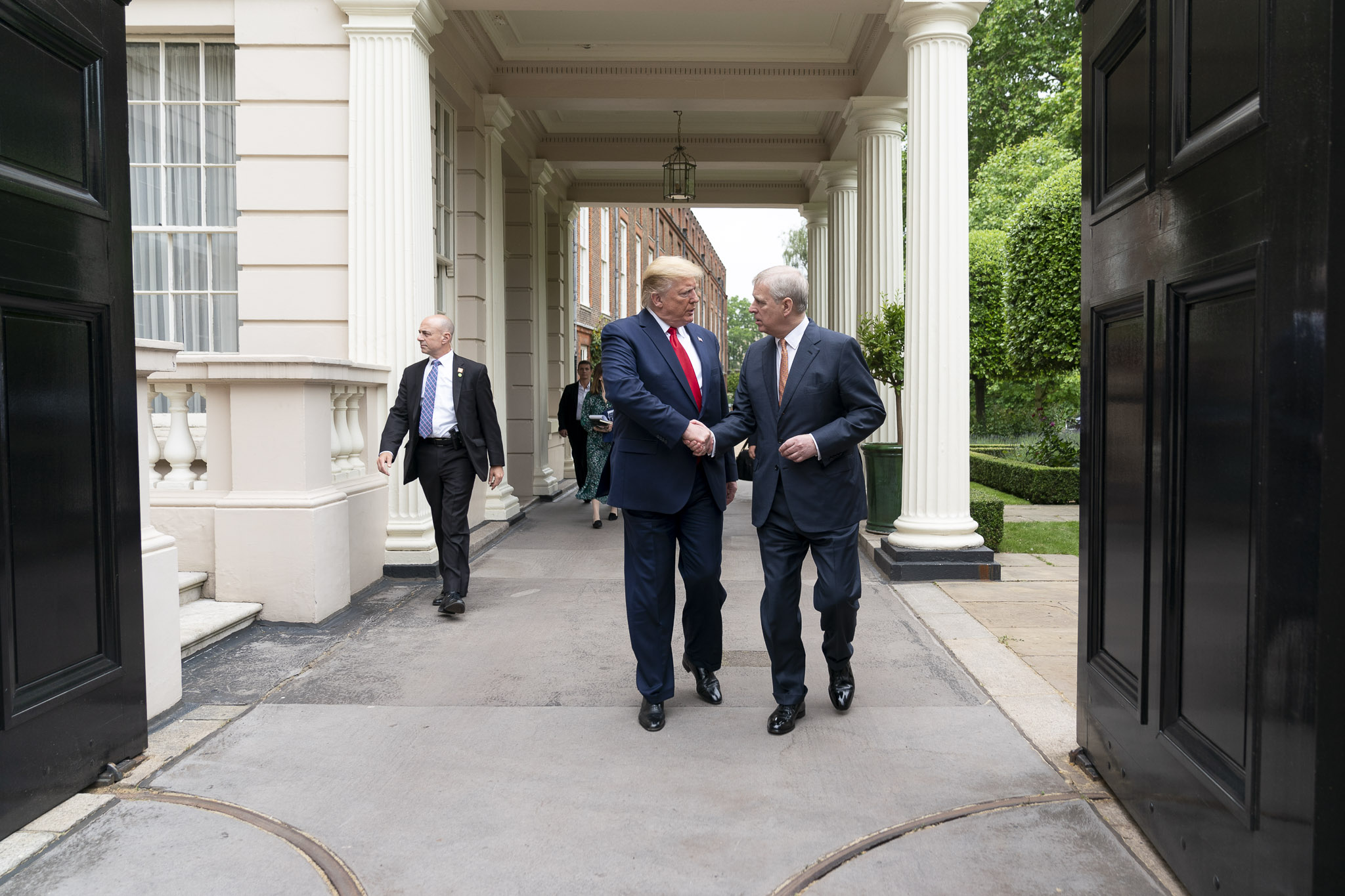
With US President Donald Trump leaving Clarence House in London, June 2019

While touring India as part of the Queen's Diamond Jubilee in 2012, Andrew became interested in the work of Women's Interlink Foundation (WIF), a charity that helps women acquire skills to earn an income. He and his family later initiated Key to Freedom, a project intended to "find a route to market for products made by WIF".

In 2014, Andrew founded the Pitch@Palace initiative to support entrepreneurs by amplifying and accelerating their business ideas. Entrepreneurs selected for Pitch@Palace Bootcamp were officially invited by Andrew to attend St James's Palace to pitch their ideas and connect with potential investors, mentors, and business contacts. In May 2018, he visited China and opened the Pitch@Palace China Bootcamp 2.0 at Peking University. On 18 November 2019, accountancy firm KPMG announced it would not renew its sponsorship of Pitch@Palace, and on 19 November Standard Chartered also withdrew its support.

Amanda Thirsk became chief executive of Pitch@Palace in November 2019, following Andrew's withdrawal from royal duties. Thirsk resigned as chief executive of Pitch@Palace in April 2020, and by early 2021, ownership was transferred to Knox House Trustees (UK) Limited, a company ultimately owned by Doug Barrowman. In 2023, ownership of Knox House Trustees (UK) Limited was transferred to Andrew's accountant Arthur Lancaster. In November 2025, Pitch@Palace Global entered the dissolution process, initiated by its director, following the winding-up of its UK arm in 2021.

Andrew founded the Prince Andrew Charitable Trust which aimed to support young people in different areas such as education and training. In May 2020, it was reported that the trust was under investigation by the Charity Commission regarding regulatory concerns about £350,000 in payments to his former private secretary Amanda Thirsk. He also established several awards, including the Inspiring Digital Enterprise Award (iDEA), a programme designed to develop digital and enterprise skills, the Duke of York Award for Technical Education, presented to talented young people in technical fields, and the Duke of York Young Entrepreneur Award, which recognised young entrepreneurial talent.

Andrew was additionally involved with the private limited company the Duke of York's Community Initiative (known as the Yorkshire Foundation between 2005 and 2011) and with a separate charity of a similar name, both of which supported voluntary organisations in Yorkshire. The company and the charity were dissolved in 2023 and 2024, respectively.

== Trade and commercial activities ==
=== Special Representative for International Trade and Investment ===
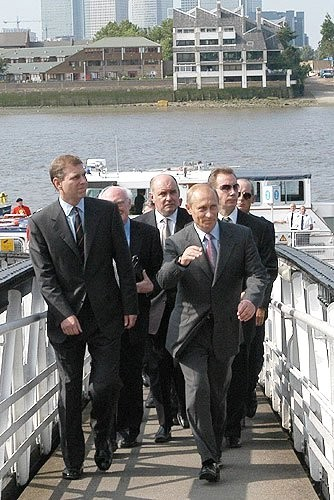
With Russian President Vladimir Putin in London, 26 June 2003

From 2001 to July 2011, Andrew worked with UK Trade & Investment, part of the Department for Business, Innovation and Skills, as the United Kingdom's Special Representative for International Trade and Investment. The post, previously held by Prince Edward, Duke of Kent, involved representing and promoting the UK at trade fairs and conferences around the world. His suitability for the role was challenged in the House of Commons by Shadow Justice Minister Chris Bryant in February 2011, during the 2011 Libyan civil war, on the grounds that he was "not only a very close friend of Saif al-Islam Gaddafi, but also ... a close friend of the convicted Libyan gun smuggler Tarek Kaituni".

Further criticism arose after Andrew hosted a lunch for Sakher El Materi, a member of the corrupt Tunisian regime, at Buckingham Palace around the time of the Tunisian Revolution. Andrew also formed a friendship with Ilham Aliyev, the president of Azerbaijan, who has been criticised for corruption and human-rights abuses by Amnesty International, and visited him both during and after his tenure as the trade envoy. As of November 2014, Andrew had met Aliyev on 12 occasions. These controversies, together with his ties to Epstein, led him to step down from the role in 2011. In the emails released in 2026, Epstein once blamed Andrew's brother, Prince Charles, for causing Andrew to lose his trade envoy role.

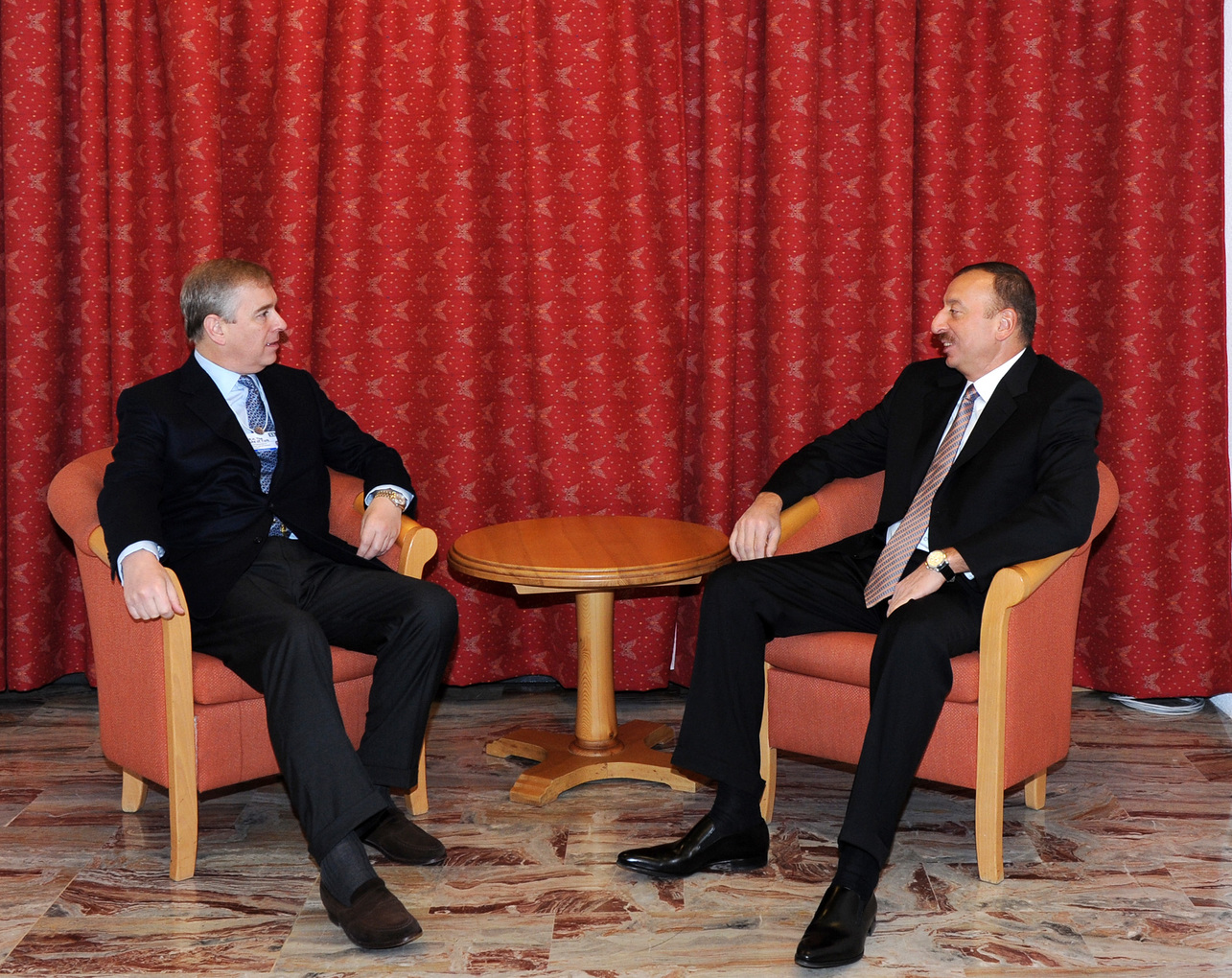
With Azerbaijani president Ilham Aliyev, 2011

Reports indicated that Andrew maintained close ties with the Saudi royal family, which was deemed helpful to British trade interests, particularly in the defense sector. Andrew did not receive a salary from the UK Trade & Investment for his role as Special Representative, but he travelled on expenses-paid delegations and was alleged to have occasionally used government-funded trips for personal leisure, earning him the nickname "Airmiles Andy" in the press. On 8 March 2011, The Daily Telegraph reported: "In 2010, the Prince spent £620,000 as a trade envoy, including £154,000 on hotels, food and hospitality and £465,000 on travel." In 2026, an anonymous former civil servant alleged that while serving as trade envoy, Andrew used taxpayer money for "massage services".

Official documents relating to Andrew's business trips between 2001 and 2011 will not be released by the Foreign Office until 2065. In May 2026, the government released papers concerning Andrew's trade role, including a February 2000 memorandum by Sir David Wright, then chief executive of British Trade International. The memo stated that Queen Elizabeth II had been "very keen" for Andrew to take on a "prominent role in the promotion of national interests" and that it was her "wish" that he take over the role from the Duke of Kent as the UK's special representative for trade.

==== Alleged comments on corruption and Kazakhstan ====
As the United Kingdom's Special Trade Representative, Andrew travelled widely to promote British businesses. The United States diplomatic cables leak revealed that Tatiana Gfoeller, the United States Ambassador to Kyrgyzstan, had reported Andrew discussing bribery in Kyrgyzstan and the investigation into the Al-Yamamah arms deal. According to Gfoeller, he was referring to an investigation, later closed, into alleged kickbacks a senior Saudi royal was said to have received in connection with a multi‑year BAE Systems contract. The dispatch reported that those present, described as his mother's subjects, reacted with approval. It stated that he criticised journalists, particularly those from The Guardian, saying they "poke their noses everywhere", and that he claimed this made business more difficult for British companies. It added that the group "practically clapped".

In May 2008, Andrew attended a goose-hunt in Kazakhstan with President Nursultan Nazarbayev. In 2010, it emerged that the president's son-in-law, Timur Kulibayev, had paid Andrew's representatives £15 million – £3 million above the asking price – via offshore companies, for Andrew's Surrey mansion, Sunninghill Park. A BBC investigation later reported that Kulibayev had financed the purchase in part through a loan from Enviro Pacific Investments, a firm which Italian prosecutors concluded had received funds linked to a 2007 bribery scheme. The BBC further reported that the final payments associated with the alleged scheme occurred only weeks before contracts were exchanged for Sunninghill Park, raising questions about whether Andrew may have inadvertently benefited from the proceeds of crime, and whether appropriate due-diligence checks had been carried out. Kulibayev denied any involvement in bribery or corruption, has not been charged, and his lawyers stated that the loan had been obtained on commercial terms and later repaid with interest. He frequently appeared in US diplomatic cables as one of the individuals who had accumulated significant wealth in gas-rich Kazakhstan. It was later reported that Andrew's office had attempted to secure a crown estate property close to Kensington Palace for Kulibayev at the time.

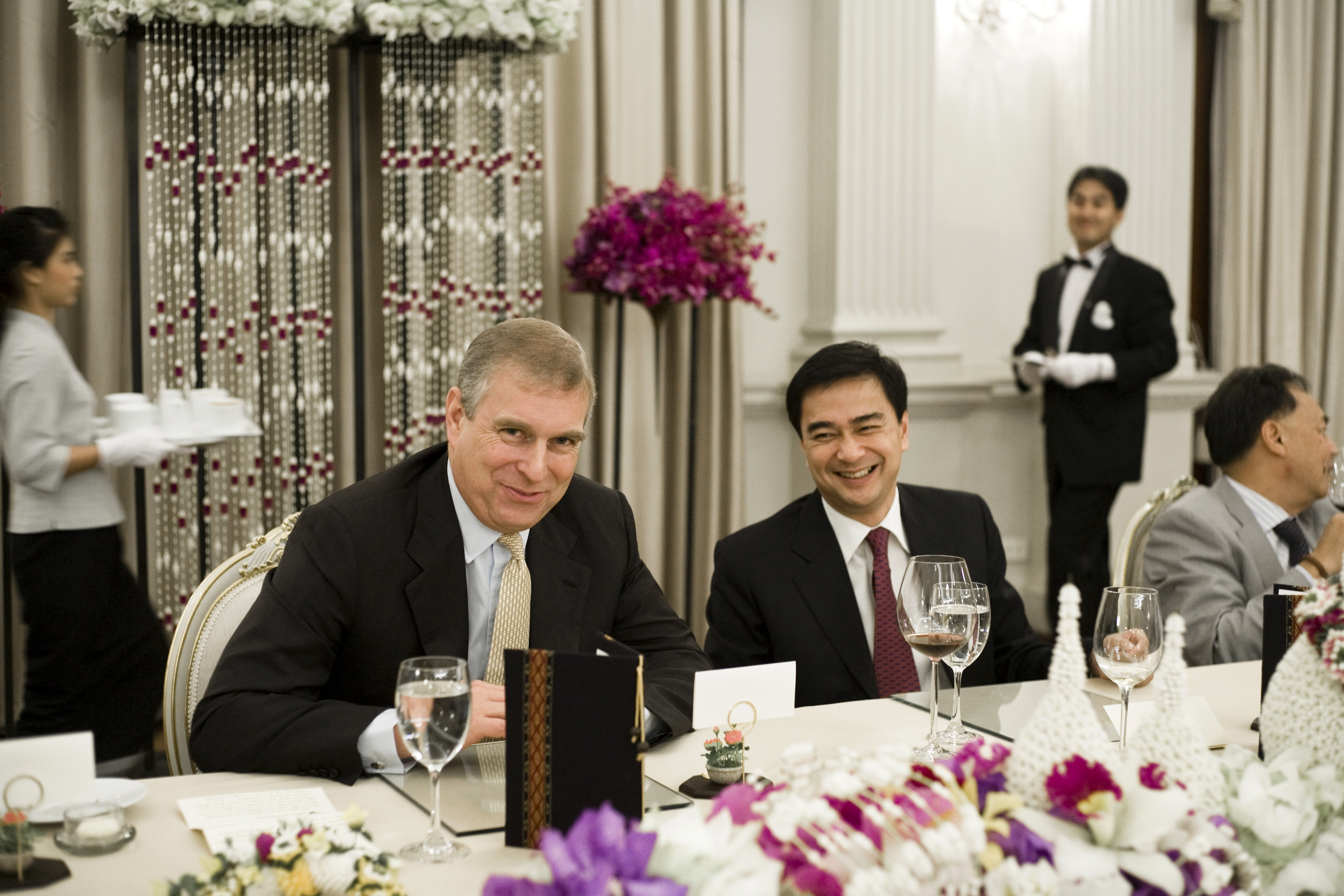
With Thailand's Prime Minister Abhisit Vejjajiva in October 2009

In May 2012, Swiss and Italian police investigating "a network of personal and business relationships" allegedly used for "international corruption" examined the activities of Enviro Pacific Investments, which charged "multi-million pound fees" to energy companies seeking to operate in Kazakhstan. The trust is believed to have paid £6 million towards the purchase of Sunninghill, which now appears derelict. A Palace spokesman responded: "This was a private sale between two trusts. There was never any impropriety on the part of The Duke of York". Libby Purves wrote in The Times in January 2015: "Prince Andrew dazzles easily when confronted with immense wealth and apparent power. He has fallen for 'friendships' with bad, corrupt and clever men, not only in the US but in Libya, Kazakhstan, Uzbekistan, Tunisia, wherever."

In May 2016, a further controversy arose when the Daily Mail alleged that Andrew had brokered a deal to assist a Greek and Swiss consortium in securing a £385-million contract to build water and sewerage networks in two of Kazakhstan's largest cities while serving as trade envoy, and that he stood to gain a £4-million commission. The newspaper published an email from Andrew to Kazakh oligarch Kenges Rakishev – who had allegedly brokered the sale of Sunninghill Park – and reported that Rakishev had arranged meetings for the consortium. After initially stating that the email was a forgery, Buckingham Palace sought to block its publication as a privacy breach. The Palace denied that Andrew had acted as a "fixer" calling the article "untrue, defamatory and a breach of the editor's code of conduct". Former Foreign Office minister, MP Chris Bryant commented: "When I was at the Foreign Office it was very difficult to see in whose interests he [Andrew] was acting. He doesn't exactly add lustre to the Royal diadem".

==== Arms sales ====
During his tenure as the UK's Special Representative for International Trade and Investment, Andrew faced significant controversy regarding his role in fostering arms deals with Saudi Arabia, particularly in relation to alleged bribery and corruption involving BAE Systems. In March 2011, Kaye Stearman of the Campaign Against the Arms Trade (CAAT) told Channel 4 News that the organisation viewed Andrew as part of a wider problem. She argued that he helped advance arms sales on behalf of UKTI.

In January 2014, Andrew took part in a delegation to Bahrain, a close ally of the United Kingdom. Andrew Smith, a spokesman for CAAT, said: "We are calling on Prince Andrew and the UK government to stop selling arms to Bahrain. By endorsing the Bahraini dictatorship Prince Andrew is giving his implicit support to their oppressive practices. When our government sells arms it is giving moral and practical support to an illegitimate and authoritarian regime and directly supporting their systematic crackdown on opposition groups. (...) We shouldn't allow our international image to be used as a PR tool for the violent and oppressive dictatorship in Bahrain." Smith also stated: "The prince has consistently used his position to promote arms sales and boost some of the most unpleasant governments in the world, his arms sales haven't just given military support to corrupt and repressive regimes. They've lent those regimes political and international legitimacy."

=== Promotion of Banque Havilland ===
In November 2020, following reviews of emails, internal documents, and unreported regulatory filings, as well as interviews with former bank insiders, Bloomberg Businessweek reported that Andrew had used his royal status and his role as trade envoy to assist David Rowland and his private bank, Banque Havilland, in securing clients around the world. The Rowland family were among Andrew's investment advisers, and he attended the bank's official opening ceremony in July 2009. In his email exchanges with Jeffrey Epstein in May 2010, Andrew described Rowland as his "trusted money man", although he appeared reluctant to invest despite Andrew's encouragement. It has been alleged that Banque Havilland sought to service dictators and kleptocrats.

In 2021, Bloomberg News reported that a firm connected to Rowland had been paying off Andrew's debts. In November 2017, Andrew borrowed £250,000 from Banque Havilland, adding to an existing £1.25 million loan that had been "extended or increased 10 times" since 2015. Documents indicated that although the "credibility of the applicant" had been questioned, the loan was approved in an effort to "further business potential with the Royal Family". Eleven days later, in December 2017, £1.5 million was transferred from an account at Albany Reserves – controlled by the Rowland family – to Andrew's account at Banque Havilland, paying off the loan due in March 2018.

In February 2026, The Daily Telegraph reported that, in February 2010, while serving as the UK's trade envoy, Andrew forwarded a confidential Treasury briefing on the Icelandic financial crisis to Jonathan Rowland, the chief executive of Banque Havilland.

=== Relationship with alleged Chinese spy ===
In December 2024, it was reported that Andrew had invited Chris Yang, a Chinese businessman initially identified as "H6" in legal documents, to events at royal residences. Yang had been authorised by a royal aide, Dominic Hampshire, to act on Andrew's behalf when dealing with potential investors in China. Yang was barred from entering the United Kingdom in 2023 due to alleged involvement in "covert and deceptive activity" on behalf of the Chinese Communist Party. Andrew ceased all contact with Yang following government concerns. According to a 2025 report by The Telegraph, UK intelligence agencies deemed Andrew a potential national‑security risk because of his repeated meetings and close relationship with Yang, with concerns dating back to 2021 that his vulnerability and access could be exploited.

In 2025, it was reported that Andrew had met Cai Qi – who later became the first-ranked member of the Secretariat of the Chinese Communist Party (CCP) and de facto chief of staff to Xi Jinping – in London in 2018 and in Beijing in 2018 and 2019. Cai had been suspected of receiving sensitive information from British nationals Christopher Cash and Christopher Berry, though charges against them were dropped by the Crown Prosecution Service in 2025. The London meeting formed part of a welcome event for a Beijing delegation attended by then-Labour leader Jeremy Corbyn, Scottish former first minister Nicola Sturgeon, former Cabinet Office minister David Lidington, and London Mayor Sadiq Khan. Andrew's subsequent meetings with Cai were connected to the expansion and launch of his Pitch@Palace business initiative in China.

== Finances ==
Andrew received a £249,000 annuity from Queen Elizabeth II, which was reduced by King Charles III in April 2023. In the twelve-month period up to April 2004, he spent £325,000 on flights, and his trade missions as special representative for UKTI cost £75,000 in 2003. The Sunday Times reported in July 2008 that, for "the Duke of York's public role ... he last year received £436,000 to cover his expenses". He also receives a Royal Navy pension of £20,000.

In June 2019, Andrew arranged a private Buckingham Palace tour for Jay Bloom and Michael Evers, businessmen from the US cryptocurrency mining company Pegasus Group Holdings, which had agreed to pay his ex-wife up to £1.4 million for her role as a "brand ambassador". Bloom and Evers were driven into the Palace in Andrew's car from their Knightsbridge hotel and later attended his Pitch@Palace event at St James's Palace before dining that evening with Andrew, Ferguson, and their daughter Beatrice. Ferguson was promoting Pegasus's plan to use thousands of solar-powered generators to mine Bitcoin in Arizona, though the project collapsed after acquiring only 615 of the planned 16,000 units and generating just $33,779 (£25,000) in cryptocurrency. Ferguson first met Bloom in Las Vegas in 2018, and he and Evers visited London frequently in 2019, meeting the York family on several occasions. In October 2019, Ferguson signed a contract via Alphabet Capital, a British company owned by Adrian Gleave, through which she was paid more than £200,000 for Pegasus-related work. Court documents showed that Andrew also received £60,500 traced to Gleave's businesses, though neither party explained the payments.

Several months after Andrew's controversial 2019 Newsnight interview, his private office established the Urramoor Trust, which owned both Lincelles (established 2020) and Urramoor Ltd (established 2013), and was, according to The Times, set up to support his family. Lincelles was voluntarily wound up in 2022. Andrew was described as a "settlor but not a beneficiary" and did not own either company, though Companies House listed him and his long-time private banker Harry Keogh as persons with "significant control".

In March 2022, it was reported that, on 15 November 2019, the wife of jailed former Turkish politician İlhan İşbilen had transferred £750,000 to Andrew in the belief that it would help her secure a passport. He repaid the money 16 months later after being contacted by İşbilen's lawyers. The Telegraph reported that the payment had been described to the bankers "as a wedding gift" for his elder daughter, Beatrice, though court documents did not suggest that Beatrice was aware of the transaction. İşbilen alleges that a further £350,000 was paid to Andrew through businessman Selman Turk, who she is suing for fraud. Turk had received the People's Choice Award for his business Heyman AI at a Pitch@Palace event held at St James's Palace days before the £750,000 transfer. In October 2025, it was reported that in December 2019 Andrew received £60,500 from Adrian Gleave, whose company Alphabet Capital Limited had also funneled money from Nebahat İşbilen to Andrew and Ferguson. Court documents indicated that Alphabet Capital had made – and might continue to make – substantial payments to Andrew, despite being listed as a dormant company with minimal turnover. Gleave had links to SVS Securities, a firm shut down by regulators over pension mis-selling. In November 2026, Andrew was issued with a witness summons to testify in the civil fraud proceedings brought by Nebahat İşbilen against Selman Turk. The summons followed a High Court judge's decision to allow Andrew to be called as a witness regarding payments he allegedly received from parties involved in the case. However, he could apply to have the summons set aside, meaning his appearance was not guaranteed, and he was not a party to the lawsuit. İşbilen's lawyers said the summons was believed to be the first issued to a member of the British royal family in 156 years, with the previous reported instance occurring in 1870, when the future King Edward VII, then Prince of Wales, was summoned to give evidence in divorce proceedings brought by Sir Charles Mordaunt, a Member of Parliament.

Tarek Kaituni, a Libyan-born convicted gun smuggler, introduced Andrew to Selman Turk in May or June 2019 and met him on at least two occasions. Kaituni, for whom Andrew had allegedly lobbied a British company, had reportedly given Beatrice an £18,000 gold and diamond necklace for her 21st birthday in 2009 and was invited to Eugenie's wedding in 2018. Andrew also received "half" of £100,000 that Turk claimed was a payment to businessman Adrian Gleave to fund a search for "finding yoghurt production facilities in America". In October 2025, The Guardian reported that Andrew was set to receive a one-off six-figure payment from the King's private funds to help finance his move from Royal Lodge to a smaller property on the Sandringham estate. He would also receive an annual stipend worth several times his £20,000 naval pension.

== Epstein scandal ==
=== Jeffrey Epstein and related associations ===
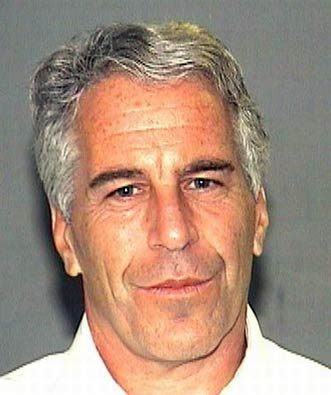
Jeffrey Epstein maintained links with Andrew before and after his 2008 conviction.

Andrew was a friend of Jeffrey Epstein, an American financier who pleaded guilty in 2008 to soliciting prostitution from a person under the age of 18. In December 2010, Andrew was photographed walking with Epstein in Central Park during a visit to New York City. In July 2011, Andrew's role as trade envoy was terminated, amid escalating controversy over his associations, particularly with Epstein.

In 2011, Virginia Giuffre, a prominent accuser of Epstein, told the Daily Mail that she had never had sexual contact with the then-Prince Andrew, but she later alleged that Epstein trafficked her to Andrew on several occasions. That same year, The Daily Telegraph reported that Epstein's private jet had once landed at RAF Marham in Norfolk. It has been alleged that Andrew "pulled strings" to enable Epstein to use the RAF base.

On 30 December 2014, a court filing in Florida by the lawyers Bradley J. Edwards and Paul G. Cassell alleged that Andrew was among several prominent figures, including lawyer Alan Dershowitz and "a former prime minister", who had participated in sexual activities with a minor later identified as Virginia Giuffre (then known by her maiden name, Virginia Roberts), who was allegedly trafficked by Epstein. In January 2015, there was renewed media and public pressure for Buckingham Palace to explain Andrew's connection with Epstein. The Palace stated that "any suggestion of impropriety with underage minors is categorically untrue", and later repeated the denial.

Giuffre stated that she had sex with Andrew on three occasions, including during a trip to London in 2001 when she was 17, and later in New York and on Little Saint James in the US Virgin Islands during an orgy. She alleged that Epstein paid her $15,000 after she had sex with Andrew in London. Flight logs place Andrew and Giuffre in the locations where she said their meetings occurred.

Andrew and Giuffre were also photographed together, with his arm around her waist and Ghislaine Maxwell in the background. Andrew's supporters have repeatedly claimed the image is fake or edited, but most experts consider the photo to be genuine. In addition, an email sent by "G Maxwell" to Epstein in 2015, released as part of the Epstein files, appears to confirm that a photograph had been taken, stating: "In 2001 I was in London when [redacted] met a number of friends of mine including Prince Andrew. A photograph was taken as I imagine she wanted to show it to friends and family."

In August 2019, court documents associated with the defamation case between Giuffre and Maxwell revealed that a second woman, Johanna Sjoberg, alleged that Andrew had placed his hand on her breast while posing for a photo with his Spitting Image puppet in Epstein's mansion. In January 2026, another Epstein victim alleged, through her lawyer Bradley J. Edwards, that she had been sent to the UK for a sexual encounter with Andrew at Royal Lodge in 2010, when she was in her twenties. Her lawyer also said that she was subsequently shown around Buckingham Palace and served tea. In February 2026, the BBC reported on a 2011 legal letter from the Epstein files. The letter alleged that in 2006, an unnamed exotic dancer was hired for $10,000 to perform at Epstein's Florida home for him and Andrew and was then propositioned for a threesome. She stated she was paid only $2,000.

=== Newsnight interview ===
In November 2019, the BBC's Newsnight broadcast an interview of Andrew by presenter Emily Maitlis, in which he discussed his friendship with Epstein publicly for the first time. Andrew said he met Epstein in 1999 through Maxwell, contradicting comments made by his private secretary in 2011 that the two met in "the early 1990s". Maxwell also disputed Andrew's claims, stating that Ferguson was actually the one that introduced him to Epstein. In the interview, Andrew denied having sex with Giuffre on 10 March 2001, as she alleged, saying he had been at home with his daughters after attending a party at a PizzaExpress branch in Woking with his elder daughter, Beatrice.

The interview was believed by Maitlis and the Newsnight team to have been approved by the Queen, though "palace insiders" quoted by The Sunday Telegraph disputed this. Although Andrew was reportedly pleased with the outcome – giving Maitlis and the Newsnight team a tour of Buckingham Palace – the interview received overwhelmingly negative reactions from the media and the public. It was described as a "car crash", "nuclear explosion level bad", and the worst public-relations crisis for the royal family since the death of Diana, Princess of Wales.

=== Lawsuit ===
In August 2021, Giuffre sued Andrew in the federal District Court for the Southern District of New York, accusing him of "sexual assault and intentional infliction of emotional distress". On 29 October 2021, Andrew's lawyers filed a response stating that he "unequivocally denies Giuffre's false allegations". On 12 January 2022, Judge Kaplan rejected Andrew's attempts to dismiss the case, allowing the lawsuit to proceed. In February, the case was settled out of court, with Andrew making a donation to Giuffre's charity for victims of abuse, without any admission of liability.

=== Repercussions ===
On 20 November 2019, Buckingham Palace announced that Andrew was suspending his public duties "for the foreseeable future". The decision, made with the Queen's consent, was accompanied by an insistence that Andrew sympathised with Epstein's victims. Other working royals took over his commitments in the short term. On 24 November, the palace confirmed that Andrew would step down from all 230 of his patronages. The scrutiny of Andrew's relationship with Epstein also led to scrutiny of other public figures' ties to Epstein, notably those of Mette-Marit, Crown Princess of Norway.

In March 2020, Andrew hired Mark Gallagher, a crisis-management expert who had assisted high-profile clients falsely accused during Operation Midland. In May 2020, it was announced that Andrew would permanently resign from all public roles due to his ties to Epstein. In January 2022, Andrew's social-media accounts were deleted, his page on the royal family's website was rewritten in the past tense, and his military affiliations and patronages were removed to emphasise his withdrawal from public life. He also stopped using the style His Royal Highness (HRH), although it was not formally removed. In June 2022, Rachael Maskell, Labour MP for York Central, introduced a 'Removal of Titles' private members bill in the House of Commons, which would have enabled the monarch or a parliamentary committee to strip aristocratic titles from individuals deemed unworthy.

In March 2022, Andrew made his first public appearance in months, helping the Queen walk into Westminster Abbey for a memorial service for his father, the Duke of Edinburgh. In June 2022, Andrew took part in the private elements of the Garter Day ceremony, including lunch and the investiture of new members, but was excluded from the public procession amid reports that his brother Charles and nephew William had intervened to prevent him appearing in view of the public. Following the death of Queen Elizabeth II on 8 September 2022, Andrew appeared in civilian clothing at various ceremonial events. He wore military uniform for a 15-minute vigil beside the Queen's coffin at Westminster Hall on 16 September.

In October 2022, it was reported that Andrew no longer received government funding. The following month, it was also reported that he was set to lose his police protection, as he was no longer expected to undertake public duties in line with King Charles III's wishes. His armed personal protection officers were expected to be replaced by private security guards, likely to be funded by the King, at an estimated cost of up to £3 million per year. In January 2023, it was reported that Andrew could no longer use his suite of rooms at Buckingham Palace. In August 2024, The Telegraph reported that the King would withdraw funding for Andrew's security by the end of October, requiring him to pay for future security operations at Royal Lodge.

On 2 November 2025, Defence Secretary John Healey confirmed that Andrew's honorary rank of vice-admiral – retained after he relinquished his other military titles in 2022 – would be removed following direction from the King, a process finalised by 13 December. He continues to hold the South Atlantic Medal with rosette, awarded to all who served in the Falklands War. On 3 November, letters patent were issued removing Andrew's style of "Royal Highness" and the title "prince"; without these honorifics, it was agreed that he would use the family surname Mountbatten-Windsor. His appointments to the Royal Victorian Order and Order of the Garter were also rescinded, and his banner was removed from St George's Chapel, Windsor Castle, the chapel of the Order of the Garter.

Later that month, Andrew's life membership of the Savage Club was withdrawn. Commemorative plaques bearing his name were removed from several locations in the Falkland Islands, and Mid and East Antrim Council agreed to rename Prince Andrew Way in Carrickfergus. On 19 November, Metropolitan Police firearms-licensing officers requested that Andrew voluntarily surrender his firearms and shotgun certificate, which he did. No reason for the surrender was given.

In October 2026, it was reported that Police Scotland was making inquiries into allegations that women had been trafficked to Balmoral Castle in connection with Andrew's stays there with Epstein and Maxwell.

=== Alleged misconduct in public office ===
Emails disclosed as part of the Epstein files in early 2026 appear to indicate that, between 2010 and 2011, Andrew may have knowingly shared confidential information with Epstein about his official work as trade envoy; trade envoys have a duty of confidentiality over sensitive, commercial, or political information arising from their official visits. It is further alleged that in 2010, Andrew passed on an email conversation about the Royal Bank of Scotland and Aston Martin to Terence Allen and David Stern. In February 2026, Thames Valley Police stated that they were considering investigating Republic's report concerning Andrew for suspected misconduct in public office and an alleged breach of official secrets. In the United Kingdom, misconduct in public office is a common-law crime not subject to a statute of limitations.

In May 2026, it was reported that a search of court documents had shown that Buckingham Palace had received an email archive six years earlier that would have indicated Andrew shared confidential government information while serving as trade envoy. The filings state that about 30,000 emails, containing material linked to his disputed financial dealings, were passed to the Lord Chamberlain in 2020 after being taken from one of Andrew's business associates. Buckingham Palace said it could not comment while a police inquiry involving him was ongoing.

==== Arrest ====
On the morning of 19 February 2026, his 66th birthday, Andrew was arrested on suspicion of misconduct in public office at the Sandringham estate, where he had been living since leaving his home in Windsor. It was the first arrest of a senior member of the British royal family since that of King Charles I in 1647, and the first arrest of a sibling of the reigning monarch since that of Elizabeth I in 1554.

Thames Valley Police stated that they were searching addresses in Berkshire and Norfolk, and it was subsequently confirmed that officers were searching Royal Lodge in Windsor Great Park, where Andrew previously lived. Charles III released a statement expressing his "deepest concern", and said that "the law must take its course". Andrew was released from Aylsham police station later that day, around 11 hours after his arrest, under investigation.

In October 2026, it was reported that Andrew had begun legal action against the chief constable of Thames Valley Police and the Central Criminal Court, lodging a judicial review that challenged the warrants obtained before his arrest. This was the first instance since the trial of Charles I in 1649 in which a member of the royal family questioned the legality of criminal proceedings against them. On 8 October, Thames Valley Police told the High Court that the warrants used to search his homes had been issued under the wrong legislation, saying they "must be legally quashed".

==== Investigation ====
Metropolitan Police officials have sought the cooperation of the United States Department of Justice in relation to the investigation into Andrew. Communication between the UK and US authorities is regarded as an initial step before any formal requests are made, including mutual legal assistance treaty (MLAT) requests. Sir Mark Rowley, Commissioner of the Metropolitan Police, said that the force is assessing a "whole range of sexual allegations" concerning Andrew to determine whether they "merit a criminal investigation".

==== Reuters photograph ====
Widely circulated photograph by Phil Noble of Andrew leaving custody

A Reuters photograph by Phil Noble, showing what BBC News described as a "shell-shocked, haunted" Andrew slumping in his car as he left the police station, attracted international attention. The image was briefly hung at the Louvre by activists from Everyone Hates Elon under the title He's Sweating Now – a reference to Andrew's widely publicised claim in his 2019 Newsnight interview that he had been unable to sweat at the time of the alleged events – before being removed by museum staff after approximately 15 minutes.

=== Allegations of being a Russian asset ===
In February 2026, the Daily Mail reported that a 2025 United States security service assessment, titled Political Corruption: Andrew Mountbatten‑Windsor: Designated Russian Union, had been leaked to the newspaper. According to the report, the Russian government had targeted Andrew through Epstein as a way to infiltrate Britain and described him as a "useful idiot" and the "weak link" in the royal family. It stated that Russian agents exploited his "long‑standing hatred of his brother Charles" and that he "was not blackmailed or otherwise coerced into this role – rather he was a willing participant in these schemes due to financial, sexual and personal reward". The assessment further said that "Russian intelligence used AMW's sexual proclivities to establish a relationship rapport in order to exploit this mental condition for further gain".

Later that year, Andrew's biographer Andrew Lownie claimed that "Epstein was a Soviet asset" and alleged that Andrew's relationship with him involved "huge national security scandal [...] of penetration". Lownie said that, in his view, the palace preferred to "keep it to the sexual side – everyone understands that bit – and certainly not go anywhere near the national security scandal" and that "the plan [of the palace], I think, at the moment, is to throw Andrew to the wolves".

== Other allegations ==
=== Racist language ===
Rohan Silva, a former Downing Street aide, claimed that, when they met in 2012, Andrew had commented, "Well, if you'll pardon the expression, that really is the nigger in the woodpile." The former home secretary Jacqui Smith claimed that Andrew made a racist comment about Arabs during a state dinner for the Saudi royal family in 2007. Buckingham Palace denied that Andrew had used racist language on either occasion.

=== Treatment of others ===
During his four-day tour of Southern California in 1984, Andrew squirted paint at American and British journalists and photographers who were reporting on the visit, after which he told Los Angeles county supervisor Kenneth Hahn, "I enjoyed that." The incident damaged reporters' clothing and equipment, and the Los Angeles Herald Examiner submitted a $1,200 bill to the British consulate seeking compensation.

The Guardian wrote in 2022 that "his brusque manner with servants is well-documented. A senior footman once told a reporter who worked undercover at Buckingham Palace that on waking Andrew "the response can easily be 'fuck off' as 'good morning'". Former royal protection officer Paul Page, who himself was convicted and given a six-year prison sentence following a £3 million property investment scam in 2009, said in an ITV documentary that Andrew kept a collection of "50 or 60 stuffed toys" and would "shout and scream and become verbally abusive" if they "weren't put back in the right order by the maids". Page later alleged in the documentary Prince Andrew: Banished that different women visited Andrew daily, and that when one was denied entry by security, Andrew allegedly called an officer a "fat, lardy cunt" over the phone. Page said of Andrew: "He's a bully." In September 2026, Page said that he had contacted Thames Valley Police earlier in the year to offer information based on his experience as a royal protection officer but received no response, although the police later said that its investigation was complex and they were following all reasonable lines of inquiry. He subsequently contacted the US embassy in London and lodged a written statement and supporting material with the FBI concerning Andrew, Ghislaine Maxwell and women's access to Buckingham Palace, also forwarding his account to US representative Thomas Massie, who had called for allegations concerning Andrew and Jeffrey Epstein to be investigated.

Andrew was alleged to have damaged sensor-operated gates in Windsor Great Park by forcing them open in his Range Rover to avoid going an extra mile on his way home. In March 2016, the Thames Valley Police dismissed the formal report by Republic due to lack of details. Andrew's former maid, Charlotte Briggs, also recalled arranging the teddy bears on his bed and told The Sun that when she was bitten by his Norfolk Terrier in 1996 he "wasn't bothered". Briggs said that a butler later told her that Andrew and his personal doctor "laughed" about the incident. Andrew's dog was subsequently banned from Buckingham Palace. Briggs said she had been reduced to tears after being reprimanded for not properly closing the heavy curtains in his office, adding that his behaviour contrasted with that of his brothers Charles and Edward, who "weren't anything like him" and his father Philip, whom she described as "so nice and gentlemanly".

Emma Gruenbaum, a massage therapist, told The Sun that Andrew regularly overstepped boundaries, making sexual comments during appointments. She alleged he talked continually about sex during their first session and asked about when she had last had sex. Gruenbaum said Andrew arranged regular massages for around two months, and she believed the requests stopped when he realised he would not get more. In 2025, Andrew Lownie alleged in his book Entitled: The Rise and Fall of the House of York that Andrew reprimanded a palace employee for not using the proper name and title when referring to his grandmother Queen Elizabeth the Queen Mother, calling him a "fucking imbecile". Another employee alleged that Andrew would "explode one minute and then try to take it back the next". Biographer Robert Hardman alleged in Elizabeth II: In Private. In Public. The Inside Story that Andrew had struck the Master of the Household, Tony Johnstone-Burt, during a dispute over room availability for one of Andrew's events, and that the incident led to Prince Philip sending Johnstone‑Burt a letter of apology.

In May 2026, it was reported that Thames Valley Police were examining allegations that Andrew had acted inappropriately towards a waitress at Royal Ascot in June 2002.

== Titles, styles, honours and arms ==
=== Titles and styles ===
Monogram

As a son of the reigning monarch, Andrew was styled at birth as "His Royal Highness The Prince Andrew". On 23 July 1986, the day of his wedding, he was created Duke of York, Earl of Inverness, and Baron Killyleagh, and assumed the style "His Royal Highness The Duke of York". He was occasionally known as Earl of Inverness in Scotland and Baron Killyleagh in Northern Ireland.

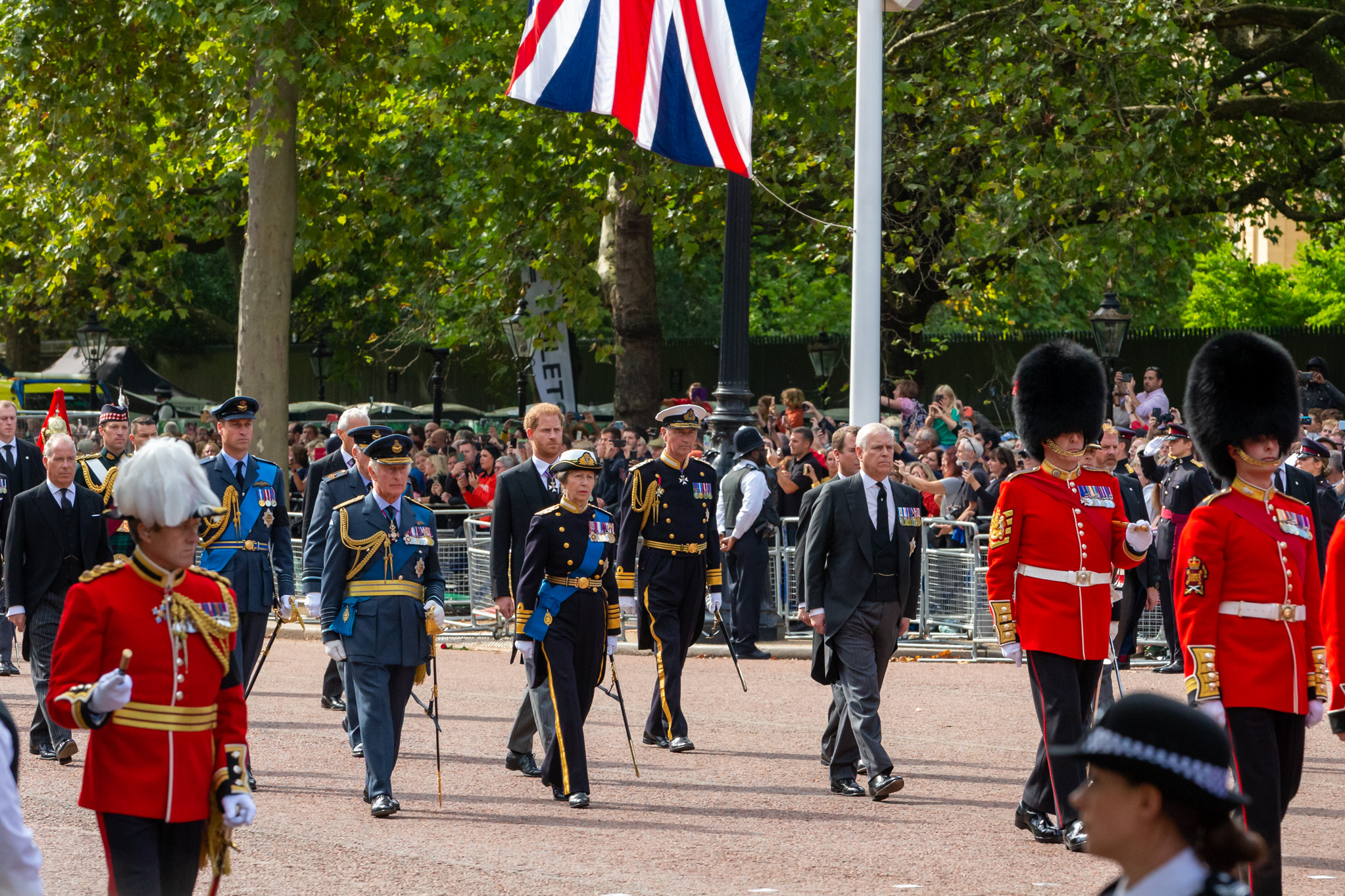
Procession from Buckingham Palace to Westminster Hall for the lying-in-state of Queen Elizabeth II on 14 September 2022

In 2019, in light of Andrew's friendship with the convicted sex offender Epstein, residents of Inverness began a campaign to strip him of his earldom, saying that "it is inappropriate that Prince Andrew is associated with our beautiful city".

==== 2022 ====
On 13 January 2022, Buckingham Palace announced that Andrew had ceased using the style "Royal Highness" publicly, though he remained permitted to use it privately. On 14 January, Rachael Maskell, the Labour Co-op MP for York Central, called for Andrew to lose his dukedom, and a renewed petition to remove Andrew's earldom was launched in Inverness, gaining over 6000 signatures by 16 September.

On 16 February, residents of Killyleagh expressed their opinion that Andrew should be stripped of his barony, and Maskell said she would seek legislation to remove Andrew's dukedom if he did not relinquish it voluntarily. On 27 April, the City of York Council removed Andrew's honorary freedom of the city by a unanimous vote, and York councillors called for him to lose his dukedom.

==== 2025 changes ====
On 17 October 2025, following discussions with King Charles III, Andrew agreed to cease using his peerages and honours, including his dukedom and his knighthoods as a Royal Knight Companion of the Order of the Garter and a Knight Grand Cross of the Royal Victorian Order. His banner of arms, which had hung in St George's Chapel, Windsor Castle, since 2006 to signify his membership of the Order of the Garter, was removed.

On 30 October, Buckingham Palace announced that the King had begun a "formal process" to remove his brother's style, titles, and honours. Andrew's name was removed from the Roll of the Peerage the same day. Although this did not revoke his peerages, it meant he was no longer entitled to any place in the orders of precedence in the United Kingdom derived from them, and ceased to be addressed or referred to by any title derived from his peerages in official documents. His profile was taken down from the royal website the following day.

On 3 November, letters patent were issued that removed the style "Royal Highness" and the title "prince" from Andrew, and on 1 December, a notice, backdated to 30 October, was published in The London Gazette, stating that his appointments to the Order of the Garter and Royal Victorian Order had been annulled. He is to use the surname "Mountbatten-Windsor", in accordance with the 1960 Privy Council declaration on the family surname by Queen Elizabeth II. On 13 December, the Ministry of Defence announced that the Defence Council of the United Kingdom had removed Andrew's honorary rank of vice-admiral, whereupon he reverted to the rank of commander (retired). Also in December, New Zealand stripped him of the 1990 Commemoration Medal.

==== 2026 ====
On 19 February 2026, after Andrew was arrested on suspicion of misconduct in public office, the Norwegian royal family announced that he had relinquished and returned his appointment as a member of the Order of St. Olav.

Andrew remains eighth in the line of succession to the British throne as of 2026. The UK government has indicated that it is considering legislation to remove him from the line of succession, a step that would require the consent of all Commonwealth realms. The governments of Canada, Australia, and New Zealand have stated that they would support such a measure.

As the third British subject of full age in the line of succession domiciled in the UK, Andrew holds the position of Counsellor of State, although it is unlikely he would be called upon to exercise any royal functions in that capacity because he is no longer a working member of the royal family; he would automatically cease to hold the role if removed from the line of succession.

==== Naval ranks ====
- (United Kingdom) 1979–1981: Midshipman, Britannia Royal Naval College, HMS Seahawk
- (United Kingdom) 1981–1984: Sub Lieutenant, Pilot, 820 NAS on HMS Invincible
- (United Kingdom) 1984–1992: Lieutenant, Pilot, 815 NAS on HMS Brazen; Helicopter Warfare Instructor, 702 NAS at RNAS Culdrose; Flight Commander, 829 NAS on HMS Campbeltown
- (United Kingdom) 1992–1999: Lieutenant Commander, Captain, HMS Cottesmore; Senior Pilot, 815 NAS at RNAS Portland; Directorate of Naval Operations, Ministry of Defence
- (United Kingdom) 1999–2005: Commander, Diplomacy Section of the Naval Staff. Released from the active list in 2001.
- (United Kingdom) 2005–2010: Honorary Captain
- (United Kingdom) 2010–2015: Rear Admiral
- (United Kingdom) 2015–2025: Vice Admiral
- (United Kingdom) 2025–: Commander (retired)

=== Honours ===
==== Commonwealth ====
- 21 February 2011 – 30 October 2025: Knight Grand Cross of the Royal Victorian Order (GCVO)
  - 2 June 2003 – 21 February 2011: Knight Commander of the Royal Victorian Order (KCVO)
  - 19 December 1979 – 2 June 2003: Commander of the Royal Victorian Order (CVO)
- 23 April 2006 – 30 October 2025: Royal Knight Companion of the Most Noble Order of the Garter (KG)
- 2015: Grand Companion of the Order of Logohu
- 1977: Queen Elizabeth II Silver Jubilee Medal
- 1982: South Atlantic Medal, with Rosette
- 2002: Queen Elizabeth II Golden Jubilee Medal
- 2012: Queen Elizabeth II Diamond Jubilee Medal
- 2022: Queen Elizabeth II Platinum Jubilee Medal
- 2016: Naval Long Service and Good Conduct Medal with two bars
- 1990–2025: New Zealand 1990 Commemoration Medal
- 2000: Canadian Forces' Decoration (CD) (with the first clasp)
- 2005: Commemorative Medal for the Centennial of Saskatchewan

==== Foreign ====
- 1988–2026: Grand Cross of the Royal Norwegian Order of St. Olav for "excellent services to Norway and humanity" (returned in February 2026)
- (United Arab Emirates) 2010: Collar of the Order of the Federation
- (Mexico) 2015: Sash of the Mexican Order of the Aztec Eagle
- (Spain) 2017: Order of Isabella the Catholic

==== Appointments ====
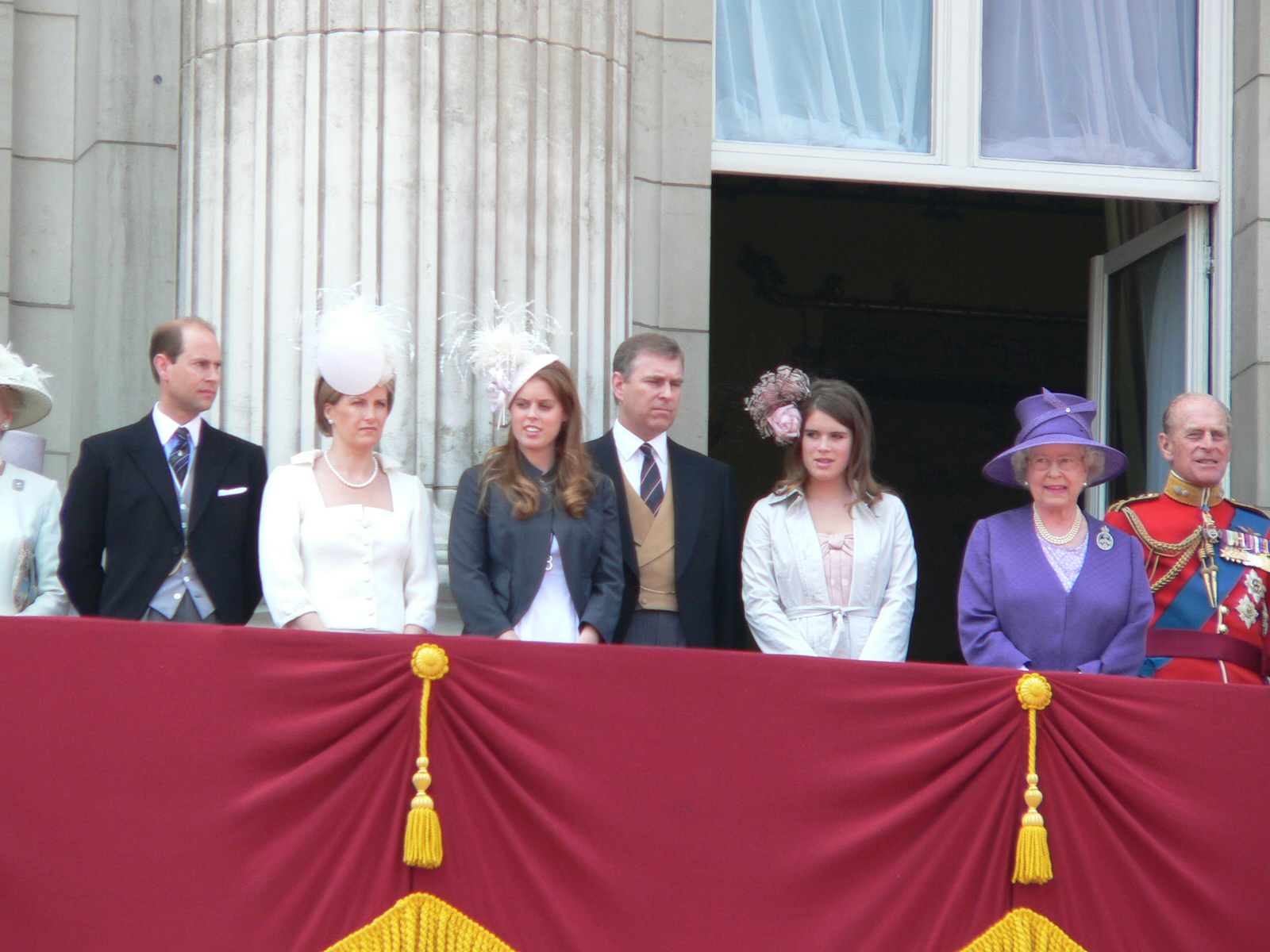
Andrew (centre) with his family at Trooping the Colour, June 2006

- 1 February 1984 – 13 January 2022: Personal aide-de-camp to the Queen
- 2002–2022: Grand Master of the Honourable Company of Air Pilots (called the Guild of Air Pilots and Air Navigators until 2014)
- 2007: Lord High Commissioner to the General Assembly of the Church of Scotland
- 2012: Royal Bencher, Lincoln's Inn
- 2012: Liveryman of the Worshipful Company of Shipwrights
- 5 May 2013: Royal Fellow of the Royal Society (FRS)
  - Andrew's election to the Royal Society in 2013 prompted criticism from various British scientists due to his lack of scientific background, with some stating he had only a secondary school level of education. In an op-ed in The Independent, the pharmacologist and Fellow of the Royal Society David Colquhoun wrote, in references to Andrew's qualifications, that "if I wanted a tip for the winner of the 14.30 at Newmarket, I'd ask a royal. For most other questions, I wouldn't."
- 20 February 2015 – 13 January 2022: Grand President of the Royal Commonwealth Ex-Services League
- 13 July 2015 – 21 November 2019: Chancellor of the University of Huddersfield
- 20 April 2016: Honorary Fellow of the Society of Light and Lighting (Hon. FSLL)
- 1 May 2018 – November 2019: Honorary Fellow of Hughes Hall, Cambridge
- Member of the Honourable Artillery Company

==== Freedom of the City ====
- 23 February 1987 – 27 April 2022: Freedom of the City of York
- 2012: Freedom of the City of London

In 2012, Andrew was awarded the Freedom of the City of London "by virtue of patrimony", his father Prince Philip being a Freeman. In May 2026, the City of London Corporation passed a motion to censure Mountbatten-Windsor. In July 2026, the City of London Corporation published a plan to remove the Freedom of the City.

==== Former honorary military appointments ====
In 2019, Andrew's military affiliations were suspended and on 13 January 2022 they were formally returned to Queen Elizabeth II.

Canada

- (Canada) Colonel-in-Chief of The Queen's York Rangers (1st American Regiment) (RCAC)
- Colonel-in-Chief of the Royal Highland Fusiliers of Canada
- (Canada) Colonel-in-Chief of the Princess Louise Fusiliers
- (Canada) Colonel-in-Chief of the Canadian Airborne Regiment (disbanded)

New Zealand

- Colonel-in-Chief of the Royal New Zealand Army Logistic Regiment

United Kingdom

- (United Kingdom) Colonel of the Grenadier Guards
- (United Kingdom) Colonel-in-Chief of the Royal Irish Regiment (27th (Inniskilling) 83rd and 87th and Ulster Defence Regiment)
- (United Kingdom) Colonel-in-Chief of the Small Arms School Corps
- (United Kingdom) Colonel-in-Chief of the Yorkshire Regiment (14th/15th, 19th and 33rd/76th Foot)
- (United Kingdom) Colonel-in-Chief of the Staffordshire Regiment (disbanded)
- (United Kingdom) Colonel-in-Chief of the 9th/12th Royal Lancers (Prince of Wales's) (disbanded)
- (United Kingdom) Deputy Colonel-in-Chief of the Royal Lancers (Queen Elizabeth's Own)
- (United Kingdom) Royal Colonel of the Royal Highland Fusiliers, 2nd Battalion Royal Regiment of Scotland
- (United Kingdom) Honorary Air Commodore, Royal Air Force Lossiemouth
- (United Kingdom) Commodore-in-Chief of the Fleet Air Arm
- (United Kingdom) Admiral of the Sea Cadet Corps

=== Arms ===
Coat of arms of Andrew Mountbatten-Windsor
Notes Andrew's personal coat of arms are the coat of arms of the United Kingdom differenced by a label of three points argent, the central point charged with an anchor azure. Adopted 1963 Coronet The coronet of a son of the sovereign proper, thereon a lion statant guardant or crowned of the same coronet charged with a label as in the arms. Escutcheon Quarterly, 1st and 4th gules three lions passant guardant in pale or, 2nd or a lion rampant gules within a double tressure flory counterflory gules, 3rd azure a harp or stringed argent Supporters Dexter a lion rampant guardant or imperially crowned proper, sinister a unicorn argent, armed, crined and unguled or, gorged with a coronet or composed of crosses patée and fleurs de lis a chain affixed thereto passing between the forelegs and reflexed over the back also or. Other elements The whole differenced by a label of three points argent, the central point charged with an anchor azure. Banner The Royal Standard of the United Kingdom, labelled for difference as in his arms. as used in Scotland as used in Canada. Since 2014, Andrew has had a personal heraldic flag for use in Canada. It is the coat of arms of Canada in banner form defaced with a blue roundel surrounded by a wreath of gold maple leaves, within which is a depiction of an "A" surmounted by a coronet. Above the roundel is a white label of three points, the centre one charged with an anchor. Symbolism As with the coat of arms of the United Kingdom, the first and fourth quarters are the arms of England, the second of Scotland, the third of Ireland. The anchor has been used as a brisure by dukes of York since 1892.

== Depictions ==
Andrew was portrayed by Rufus Sewell in the 2024 Netflix drama film Scoop, which depicts the 2019 BBC Newsnight interview "Prince Andrew & the Epstein Scandal". He was portrayed by Michael Sheen in the 2024 three-part Amazon MGM Studios drama series A Very Royal Scandal, which also centres on the interview. Andrew was portrayed by Tom Byrne in the fourth season, and by James Murray in the final two seasons, of Netflix's The Crown.

== Bibliography ==
- Photographs (1985) by HRH Prince Andrew. London: Hamilton. ISBN 978-0-241-11644-9. OCLC 13947617. A book of photographs taken by Andrew.

Andrew Mountbatten-Windsor House of Windsor Born: 19 February 1960
Lines of succession
Preceded by Princess Lilibet of Sussex	Succession to the British throne 8th in line	Followed by Princess Beatrice
Peerage of the United Kingdom
Vacant 7th creation merged with the crown in 1936 Title last held by The Prince Albert	Duke of York; 8th creation 1986–present	Incumbent
Orders of precedence in the United Kingdom
Preceded by Prince Archie of Sussex	Gentlemen; Andrew Mountbatten-Windsor	Succeeded by The Duke of Edinburgh
Academic offices
Preceded by Sir Patrick Stewart	Chancellor of the University of Huddersfield; 2015–2019	Succeeded by George W. Buckley
Sporting positions
Preceded by The Duke of Kent	President of The Football Association; 2000–2006	Succeeded by Prince William of Wales
Honorary titles
Preceded by The Duke of Edinburgh	Colonel of the Grenadier Guards; 2017–2022	Vacant Title next held by The Queen
Other offices
Preceded by The Duke of Kent	Special Representative for International Trade and Investment; 2001–2011	Vacant
