= Joe Bruin =

Official mascot of UCLA

Joe & Josephine Bruin
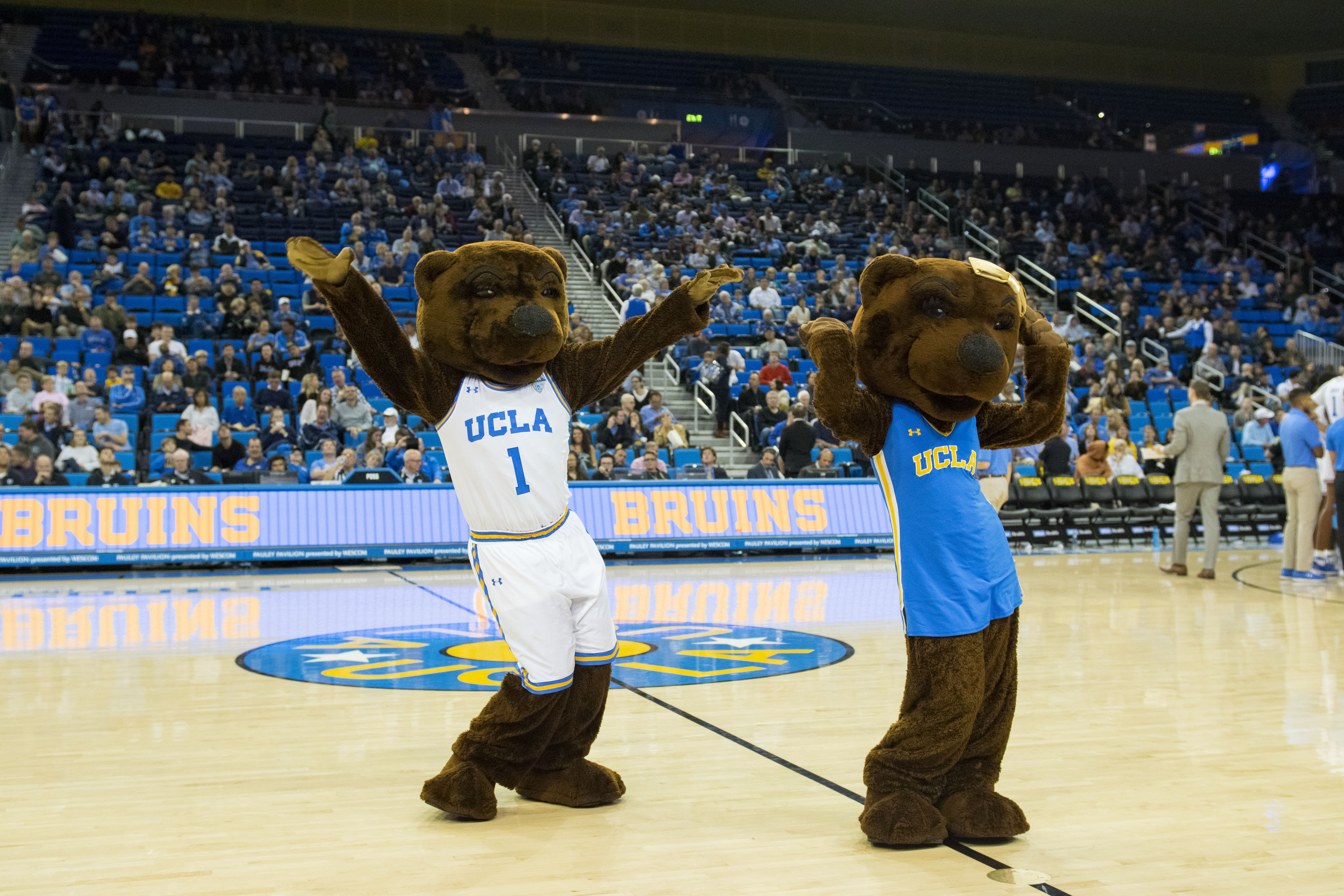
- Josephine and Joe Bruin in Pauley Pavilion
- University: University of California, Los Angeles
- Conference: Big Ten
- Description: Anthropomorphic brown bear

Joe Bruin, an anthropomorphic male brown bear, is the official mascot of the University of California, Los Angeles’ athletic teams along with Josephine "Josie" Bruin, a female brown bear, who is his regular partner at UCLA sporting events and other university activities.

== History ==
The earliest known UCLA mascot was a furry stray dog, known as Rags, that a gardener found on the campus of the Normal School in fall 1917. A brief "autobiography" of Rags was published in the Cub Californian in 1919, and he was mentioned in the Southern Campus yearbook until 1922.

While the university used different bear-related nicknames in the 1920s, it settled on "Bruins" in 1928 and began renting live bears as mascots in the 1930s. The animals would appear at all UCLA home football games at the Los Angeles Memorial Coliseum. This practice eventually stopped until students and alumni called for a new live mascot in the 1950s. A Himalayan bear cub from India nicknamed "Little Joe Bruin" was brought to Westwood before he grew too large and was transferred to a circus. "Josephine" was purchased by a group of alumni in 1961 and was kept in the backyard of the Rally Committee chairman. She was ultimately taken to the San Diego Zoo.

A costumed mascot by the name of Joe Bruin was introduced in 1963. In 1967, the first female student to take the mascot role created Josephine "Josie" Bruin and joined Joe at athletic events.

== Costumes and depiction ==
The design for the costumed bears has changed over the years, and Joe has had at least six looks over his history. A major redesign in 1996 ushered in the latest Joe and Josephine Bruin, which the Los Angeles Times described as "brawnier."

The illustrated Bruin has been represented in many ways – from a Mickey Mouse style in the 1930s to a "smiley bear" in the 1970s. His attire has included turtleneck sweaters and basketball jerseys.

== Recognition ==
Joe Bruin was on the final team for the Capital One Bowl National Mascot of the Year team four times: 2005, 2007, 2008 and 2010. The contest began in 2002 and was last held in 2014.

== Photo link ==
- Retro Joe Bruin cartoon
