= Ralph Lownie =

British judge

- Born: Ralph Hamilton Lownie; 27 September 1924; Edinburgh, Scotland
- Died: 28 November 2007 (aged 83)
- Education: George Watson's College
- Alma mater: University of Edinburgh; University of Kent
- Occupations: Barrister; judge
- Spouse: Claudine Lecrocq (m. 1960)
- Children: 2, including Andrew Lownie
- Relatives: Edward Hamilton Aitken (grandfather)

Ralph Hamilton Lownie (27 September 1924 – 28 November 2007) was a British barrister and judge.

Ralph Hamilton Lownie was born in Edinburgh on 27 September 1924 into a literary family, the son of James Hood Wilson Lownie and Jessie Helen Aitken, and educated there at George Watson's College. His maternal grandfather, Edward Hamilton Aitken, was a natural history writer, and civil servant in India, and his mother had had a book published while still a child.

In 1943 he joined the Royal Engineers and fought in the Second World War in Belgium, the Netherlands and Germany.

He earned a general arts degree from the University of Edinburgh. While working he completed a PhD in homicide and diminished responsibility at the University of Kent.

In 1960, he married Claudine Lecrocq, and they had a son, the historian Andrew Lownie, and a daughter, Solange.

== Publications ==
Auld Reekie: An Edinburgh Anthology Timewell Press, 2004 ISBN 1857252047
