= Andrew Lownie =

British historian and author (born 1961)

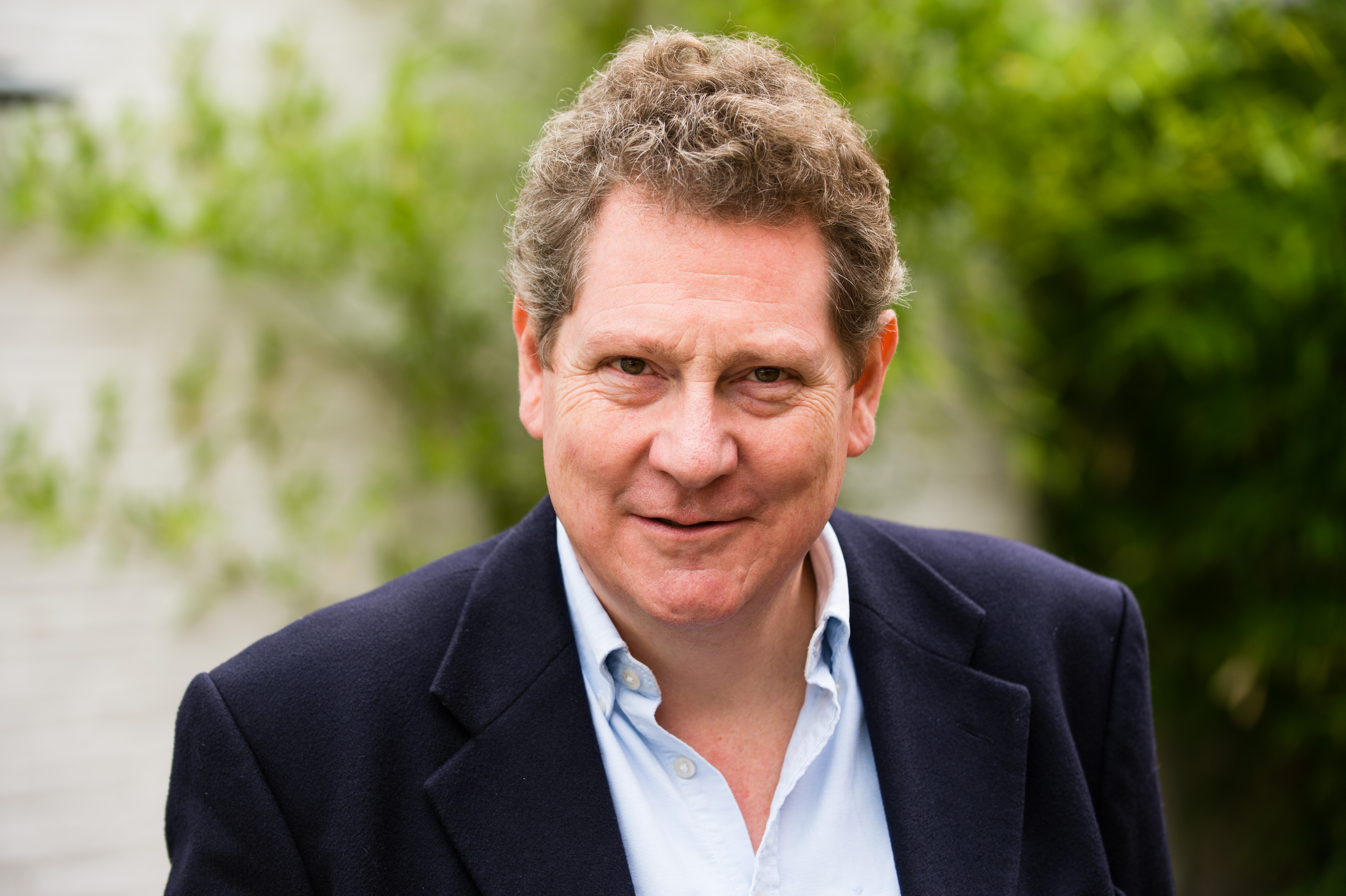
- Lownie in 2016
- Born: Andrew James Hamilton Lownie; 11 November 1961 (age 64)
- Education: Fettes College; Asheville School; Westminster School
- Alma mater: Magdalene College, Cambridge; University of Edinburgh
- Occupations: Historian and author
- Spouse: Angela Doyle (m. 1998)
- Children: 2
- Father: Ralph Lownie
- Relatives: Edward Hamilton Aitken (great-grandfather)

Andrew James Hamilton Lownie FRHistS (/ˈloʊni/; born 11 November 1961) is a British historian and author. He has written books about the royal family. This includes Traitor King: The Scandalous Exile of the Duke and Duchess of Windsor on the Duke of Windsor and his links with the Nazis, and Entitled: The Rise and Fall of the House of York on Andrew Mountbatten-Windsor and his involvement with Jeffrey Epstein. He has also written biographies of John Buchan and the Soviet spy Guy Burgess.

== Early life ==
Andrew Lownie was born in Scotland in November 1961 to Claudine Lecrocq (1932–2019) and Judge Ralph Lownie (1924–2007). He was educated at Cargilfield Preparatory School, Fettes College, Asheville School, North Carolina, and Westminster School, followed by Magdalene College, Cambridge, and was President of the Cambridge Union in Easter term 1984. He has a master's degree and doctorate from the University of Edinburgh, and is a Fellow of the Royal Historical Society. He was the Conservative Party candidate in the Monklands West constituency at the 1992 United Kingdom general election. His doctoral thesis (2019) was titled "Stalin's Englishman: the lives of Guy Burgess: biography in intelligence history" and discussed his own 2015 book on Burgess.

== Representation ==
Lownie founded his eponymous literary agency in 1988. It specialises in non-fiction, representing some 200 authors, and is reported to have "regularly been the top selling agent in the world." He founded, and is president of, The Biographers' Club, a group "committed to supporting, promoting and connecting biographers at all levels."

== Works ==
Lownie has written biographies of writer John Buchan, spy Guy Burgess and Lord Mountbatten and his wife Edwina. While researching for his book on the Mountbattens, Lownie found himself blocked by the Cabinet Office and University of Southampton from accessing some archive material, despite public money having been used in 2011 to acquire certain Mountbatten family papers for the university in order to "ensure public access".

In 2021, Lownie published Traitor King, a biography, based on fresh sources, of the Duke of Windsor. The former Edward VIII is alleged by Lownie to have been a Nazi sympathiser who gave aid and comfort to his country's enemies before and during the Second World War.

Lownie's biography of Andrew Mountbatten-Windsor (formerly Prince Andrew, Duke of York) and his former wife Sarah Ferguson, Entitled: The Rise and Fall of the House of York, was published in 2025. It contains a discussion of the then-Duke's role as a British trade envoy, as well as an account of his relationship with Jeffrey Epstein.

Lownie has also written a literary guide to Edinburgh, and edited several volumes of John Buchan's works.

In March 2026, The Times reported that Lownie's next endeavour would be a biography of Prince Philip, Duke of Edinburgh. Lownie did however say that this would not "be a hatchet job".

== Personal life ==
In 1998, Lownie married Angela Doyle, who writes histories of London houses, and they have two children.

== Selected publications ==
- Lownie, Andrew (1995). John Buchan: The Presbyterian Cavalier. Constable. ISBN 0-09-472500-4.
- Lownie, Andrew (1996). John Buchan: The Complete Short Stories. Volume One. Thistle Publishing. ISBN 0952675609. (editor)
- Lownie, Andrew (1997). John Buchan: The Complete Short Stories. Volume Two. Thistle Publishing. ISBN 095267565X. (editor)
- Lownie, Andrew (1997). John Buchan: The Complete Short Stories. Volume Three. Thistle Publishing. ISBN 0952675617. (editor)
- Lownie, Andrew (2000). The Literary Companion to Edinburgh. Methuen. ISBN 0413751309. (earlier ed 1992 Canongate Press)
- Lownie, Andrew (2015). Stalin's Englishman: Guy Burgess, the Cold War, and the Cambridge Spy Ring. Hodder & Stoughton s. ISBN 9781473627369.
- Lownie, Andrew (2019). The Mountbattens: Their Lives and Loves. Blink Publishing. ISBN 978-1788702560.
- Lownie, Andrew (2021). Traitor King: The Scandalous Exile of the Duke and Duchess of Windsor. Bonnier Books. ISBN 978-1788704816.
- Lownie, Andrew (2025). Entitled: The Rise and Fall of the House of York. William Collins. ISBN 978-0008775469.
