= Robert Hardman =

British journalist (born 1965)

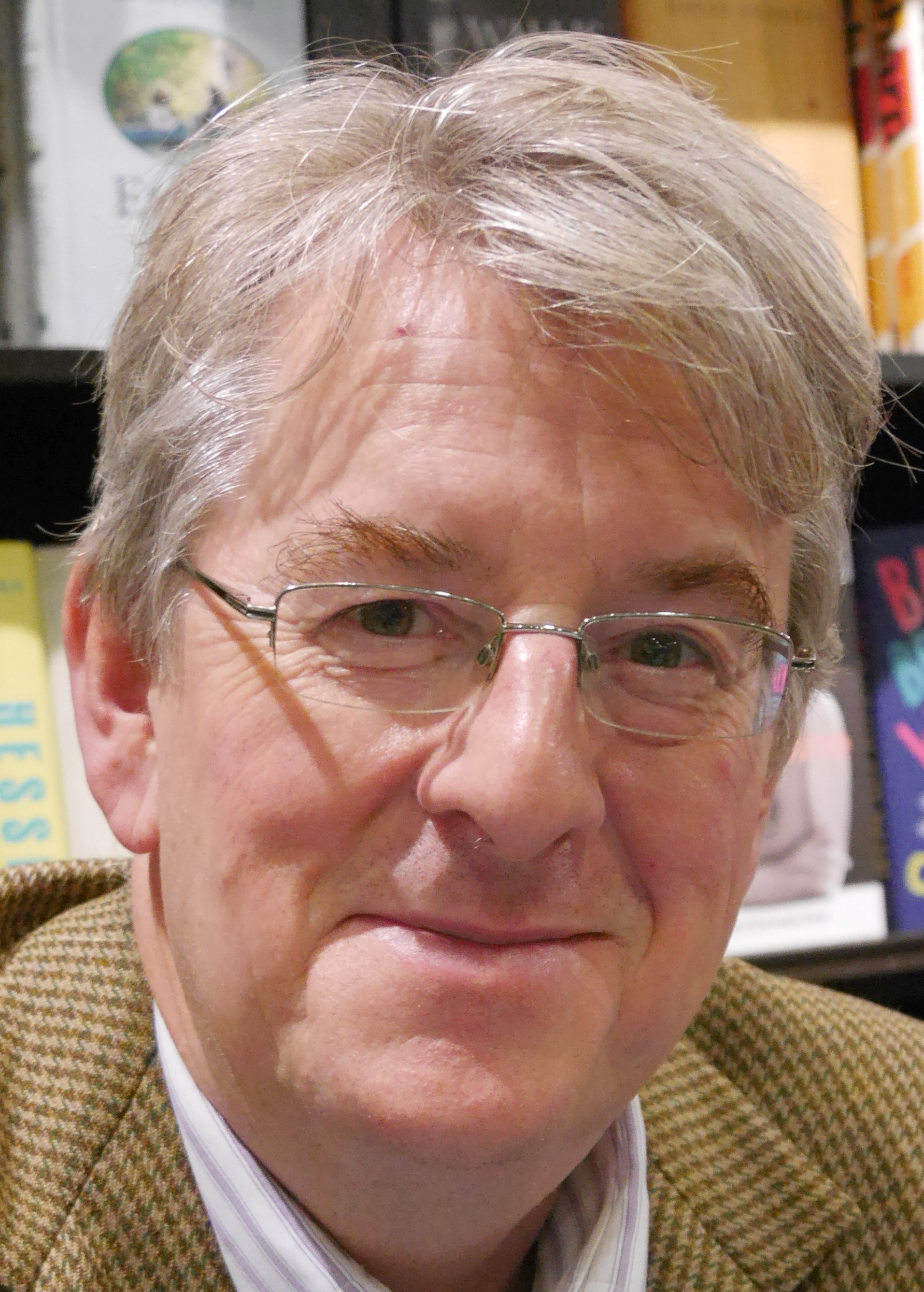
- Hardman at Hatchards, London, November 2018
- Born: 1965 (age 60–61)
- Education: Wellington College; Pembroke College, Cambridge
- Occupations: Journalist, author and documentary filmmaker

Robert Hardman (born 1965) is a British journalist, author and documentary filmmaker best known for his work on the British royal family.

== Biography ==
Hardman was born in 1965. He was educated at Wellington College and Pembroke College, Cambridge. He is a close friend of former Prime Minister David Cameron.

Hardman has been a columnist and royal correspondent for the Daily Telegraph and, since 2001, writes for the Daily Mail. He has also written for The Spectator magazine.

He has been part of the BBC commentary team at several major state occasions, including the Coronation of King Charles III, the funerals of Funeral of Queen Elizabeth II and Funeral of Prince Philip, the 70th anniversary of D-Day and the Sovereign's Birthday Parade.

Hardman's 2022 book, Queen of Our Times: The Life of Elizabeth II, was the Sunday Times Biography of the Year and was presented to President Volodymr Zelensky of Ukraine as an official gift by then Prime Minister Boris Johnson.

Hardman is married, with three children, and lives in London.

== Selected filmography ==
- The Queen's Castle (BBC1, 2005);
- Monarchy: The Royal Family At Work (BBC1, 2007);
- Charles at 60 (BBC1, 2008);
- The Duke: A Portrait of Prince Philip (ITV, 2008);
- Our Queen (ITV, 2013);
- Our Queen at Ninety (ITV, 2016);
- George III – The Genius of the Mad King (BBC2, 2017);
- Queen of the World (ITV, 2018);
- Anne – The Princess Royal At 70 (ITV, 2020)
- The Duke: In His Own Word (BBC1, 2021)
- Prince Philip: – The Royal Family Remembers (BBC1, 2021)
- Charles III: The Coronation Year (BBC1, 2023)

== Publications ==
- Monarchy – The Royal Family At Work. Ebury, 2007. ISBN 978-0091918422;
- Our Queen. Arrow, 2012. ISBN 978-0099551157;
- Queen of the World. Century, 2018. ISBN 978-1780898186
- Queen of Our Times: The Life of Elizabeth II. Macmillan, 2022. ISBN 978-1529063417
- Charles III: New King. New Court. The Inside Story. 2024. ISBN 978-1035027415
- Elizabeth II: In Private. In Public. The Inside Story. 2026. ISBN 978-1035097302
