= Terramar =

Terramar may refer to:

== Places ==
- Autódromo de Sitges-Terramar, a former racing circuit in Barcelona, Catalonia, Spain
- Terramar Visitor Center, a visitor center and museum at Hugh Taylor Birch State Park in Fort Lauderdale, Florida, United States
- Terramar, Carlsbad, California, United States, a neighborhood

== Other ==
- Cupra Terramar, a 2024– Spanish compact performance SUV
- The TerraMar Project, a former American environmental nonprofit organization

== See also ==
- Terramare culture, an archaeological culture in Northern Italy
