= Kevin Maxwell =

British businessman (born 1959)

- Born: 20 February 1959 (age 67); Maisons-Laffitte, France
- Education: Oxford University
- Occupation: Businessman
- Spouse: Pandora Warnford-Davis (m. 1984; div. 2007)
- Children: 7
- Parent(s): Robert Maxwell; Elisabeth Maxwell
- Relatives: Ian Maxwell (brother); Christine Maxwell (sister); Isabel Maxwell (sister); Ghislaine Maxwell (sister)

Kevin Francis Herbert Maxwell (born 20 February 1959) is a British businessman. In the 1990s, Maxwell was acquitted of charges relating to financial crimes connected with the business practices of his father, publishing tycoon Robert Maxwell. Formerly disqualified from being a company director, he has been declared bankrupt twice.

== Early life ==
Kevin Maxwell (born 1959) is the eighth child of Elisabeth (née Meynard), a French-born Holocaust scholar, and Robert Maxwell, a Czechoslovak-born British publishing tycoon. His father was Jewish and his mother was a French Protestant of Huguenot descent. Kevin is one of nine siblings (two of whom died in childhood). These include his older siblings Christine Maxwell, Isabel Maxwell, and Ian Maxwell along with his younger sister Ghislaine Maxwell. The family resided at Headington Hill Hall from 1960, where the offices of Robert Maxwell’s Pergamon Press were also located.

Maxwell was educated at Marlborough College and Oxford University.

== Career ==
Maxwell, along with his brother Ian, joined the family publishing business. He spent most of his working life before 1991 employed by his father, including a spell as chairman of Oxford United F.C. Robert Maxwell was known for his domineering disposition and this included behaviour towards his children. Editor Mike Molloy, who had worked for Robert Maxwell at the Daily Mirror and The European, described a conversation he had with Kevin on a flight to Moscow, where Kevin detailed his discontent in working too much with no time left for seeing his family.

Maxwell was chairman of Maxwell Communications Corporation and Macmillan Inc. at the time of his father's death in 1991. Robert Maxwell was found floating in the sea near the Canary Islands in proximity to his yacht Lady Ghislaine in November 1991. After his father died, it quickly emerged that there were severe financial troubles with the Maxwell empire that Kevin and Ian Maxwell were connected to, in particular with the pension funds for thousands of Mirror Group employees. Following his father’s death, and the collapse of the Mirror Group media empire, Kevin Maxwell became the biggest personal bankrupt in UK history with debts of £406.5 million in 1992. He was later tried and, in 1996, was acquitted of fraud charges arising from his role in his father's companies.

British courts determined that Coopers & Lybrand made gross errors during their 1990s audit of the Maxwell group of companies and fined Coopers & Lybrand a record £3.3 million.

The bankruptcy was lifted three years later, and he co-founded media company Telemonde, which later failed. He entered into a further arrangement over debts he accrued subsequently. After his discharge from bankruptcy in 2005, Maxwell went into the property industry where he has been involved in establishing large property deals, including the sale of Earls Court Exhibition Centre and Olympia, and the purchase of Stables Market in Camden Town.

In July 2011, as a result of an Insolvency Service investigation into the collapse of Syncro, a Manchester-based construction company, Maxwell was disqualified from being a company director for eight years.

In September 2018 Maxwell announced that he and his brother Ian had founded a UK think tank called Combating Jihadist Terrorism (CoJit) with the aim of better understanding terrorism and its causes.

== Personal life ==
Maxwell met Pandora Warnford-Davis while both were attending Oxford. They married in 1984 and have seven children. The family lived in the Elizabethan Moulsford Manor, near Didcot in Oxfordshire, in 2005. The couple separated in 2007, and later divorced.

== See also ==
- William Stern, Britain's biggest bankrupt before Maxwell
