= Scott Borgerson =

American businessman)

- Born: Missouri
- Education: Tufts University
- Occupation: Businessman
- Organization: CargoMetrics

Scott Borgerson is an American businessman. In 2010 Borgerson cofounded the company CargoMetrics with Rockford Weitz. CargoMetrics was valued at $100 million in 2016, and many backers of the company were billionaires, including Eric Schmidt, the CEO of Google at the time.

Scott Borgerson grew up in Missouri. His father was an official for the Marine Corps infantry, and his mother was a high school French and Spanish teacher. His family was Presbyterian. He graduated from Tufts University with a Master of Arts in law and diplomacy, and a PhD in international relations. A former coast guard officer, Borgerson married his wife in 2001 and had two children with her. The pair divorced in 2014, after which he married Ghislaine Maxwell. Maxwell's brother, Ian, said he was unaware that Borgerson and Maxwell were married until the bail application was filed.
