= Elisabeth Maxwell =

Anglo-French historical researcher (1921–2013)

- Born: Élisabeth Jenny Jeanne Meynard; 11 March 1921; Saint-Alban-de-Roche, France
- Died: 7 August 2013 (aged 92); Domme, France
- Education: St Hugh's College, Oxford, 1981
- Occupations: Holocaust researcher, proponent of interfaith dialogue
- Spouse: Robert Maxwell (m. 1945; died 1991)
- Children: 9, including Christine, Isabel, Ian, Kevin and Ghislaine

Elisabeth Jenny Jeanne Maxwell (née Meynard; 11 March 1921 – 7 August 2013) was a French-born researcher of the Holocaust who established the journal Holocaust and Genocide Studies in 1987. She was married to publishing tycoon Robert Maxwell from 1945 until his death in 1991, and was the mother of socialite and child sex trafficker Ghislaine Maxwell. Later in life, she was recognized for her work as a proponent of interfaith dialogue and received several awards including an honorary fellowship from the Woolf Institute at Cambridge.

== Early life ==
Elisabeth Maxwell was born Elisabeth Jenny Jeanne Meynard in La Grive, in the commune of Saint-Alban-de-Roche, France, to Louis "Paul" Meynard and Colombe (née Petel) Meynard. Paul Meynard was a descendant of Protestant Huguenot aristocracy (or old bourgeoisie), while Colombe Meynard was a Roman Catholic whose marriage to a Protestant resulted in her excommunication.

Her father Paul owned a silk-weaving factory and was the mayor of the village. Elisabeth had one sibling, an older sister, Yvonne. Her parents sent her to England at age nine to attend the convent of Our Lady of Compassion at Acocks Green in Birmingham. In 1932, she returned to France. Elisabeth studied law at the Sorbonne.

== Family ==
In September 1944, after the Liberation of Paris, she met Czechoslovak-born British Army Sargent Robert Maxwell, while working as an interpreter for the Welcome Committee, which introduced French people to Allied officers; Elisabeth and Robert married on 15 March 1945. She then worked as his secretary and assistant in London as he established his publishing empire. The Maxwells had nine children: Michael, Philip, Ann, Christine, Isabel, Karine, Ian, Kevin and Ghislaine. All their children were delivered with the help of her sister Yvonne, a gynecologist, in Maisons-Laffitte, France. Two of the children died in childhood: daughter Karine died in 1957, at age three, from leukemia, and son Michael entered a coma following a car crash in 1961; he died six years later without regaining consciousness. At first, the family lived on a budget, but later moved into a mansion at Broomfield, Esher. Starting in 1960, the family lived at Headington Hill Hall where the offices to Robert Maxwell's Pergamon Press were also located.

== Education and career ==
In her forties, Elisabeth worked in public relations for her husband's company and campaigned for him in the general election of 1964; Robert was elected as the Labour MP for Buckingham. Elisabeth then enrolled at Oxford in 1970 and earned a BA degree in modern languages at St Hugh's College in 1974.

In 1981, at the age of 60, Elisabeth was awarded a PhD in French Literature from the University of Oxford for her thesis on The Art of Letter Writing in France, 1789–1830. Her thesis work focused on research about a Protestant circle in Lyons.

Elisabeth researched her husband's Jewish relatives who perished under Nazi rule, and discovered they amounted in total to over 300 of his immediate and extended family.

In 1988, Elisabeth organized a conference in both Oxford and London, titled "Remembering for the Future". That same year, she received the Sir Sigmund Sternberg award for furthering Christian-Jewish relations. Elisabeth authored a book on antisemitism titled Silence or Speaking Out, published in 1990 by Southampton University.

In November 1991, Elisabeth's husband, Robert, was found dead, floating in the waters off the Canary Islands near his yacht, the Lady Ghislaine. Following his mysterious death, evidence emerged that Robert Maxwell had plundered his employees' pension funds from the Mirror Group. Their sons, Ian and Kevin, were arrested on fraud charges in June 1992 but acquitted in January 1996.

It was found that Elisabeth knew nothing about the missing pension funds; Elisabeth was left financially severely depleted after her husband's death. Yehuda Bauer, a fellow Holocaust historian, stated that after Robert Maxwell's death "Elisabeth lost her pension, all her property, and only her children continued to support her. She was a wonderful person, kind and supportive, quite contrary to her husband, whom she loved despite everything."

Following the pension scandal, Elisabeth reportedly left the UK and spent time at her chateau in France. She returned to Britain after the Duke of Westminster "let her a four-bedroomed townhouse at a peppercorn rent".

Elisabeth Maxwell's autobiography, entitled A Mind of My Own: My Life with Robert Maxwell, was published in November 1994. In a 1995 interview with The New York Times, she reflected on her marriage stating "The worst years of my life were 1981 to 1991. I was at his beck and call with no kudos, nothing was right. What saved me was my work on the Holocaust." In her seventies and early eighties, Elisabeth travelled and lectured widely on Holocaust studies.

Elisabeth Maxwell was an editor for the book Remembering for the Future: the Holocaust in an Age of Genocide, a comprehensive work including the contributions of nearly 200 scholars, published in 2001. According to BBC News, Elisabeth was the executive chairman of the Remembering for the Future organization and was the opening speaker for the London conference Evil and Indifference: Is there an End to Genocide? held at Westminster Hall in July 2000. She was on the executive committee of the International Council of Christians and Jews and founded the International Conference on the Holocaust.

Elisabeth was awarded an Honorary Fellowship from the Woolf Institute at Cambridge for her work to improve relations between Christians and Jews. She was further recognized with an Honorary Fellowship at Tel Aviv University, and received the Eternal Flame Award of the Anne Frank Institute of Philadelphia.

== Death ==
In later life, Elisabeth spent most of her time in Dordogne, France, with her sister Yvonne Meynard Vittoz LaForce (1918–2011) Elisabeth Maxwell died in Domme, Dordogne on 7 August 2013 at the age of 92.
