= Christine Maxwell =

French-British businessperson (born 1950)

- Born: 16 August 1950 (age 76); Maisons-Laffitte, France
- Citizenship: United States; France
- Education: Pitzer College; Oxford Brookes University; University of Texas at Dallas
- Known for: Information technology
- Spouse: Roger Malina (m. 1986)
- Children: 3
- Parents: Robert Maxwell (father); Elisabeth Maxwell (mother)
- Relatives: Isabel Maxwell (twin sister); Ghislaine Maxwell (sister); Kevin Maxwell (brother); Ian Maxwell (brother)

Christine Yvonne Malina-Maxwell (born 16 August 1950) is a British Internet pioneer and educator. She is the creator and co-founder of Magellan, co-founder of the software company Chiliad and the author of several books. She was the Program Manager of Learning Technologies at the University of Texas at Dallas.

== Early life and education ==
Christine Maxwell was born in Maisons Laffitte, France, on August 16, 1950. She is the daughter of Elisabeth Maxwell, a French-born Holocaust scholar, and Robert Maxwell, a Czechoslovak-born businessman. Her father was Jewish and her mother was of Huguenot descent. One of nine children, siblings include her twin sister Isabel Maxwell, brothers Kevin Maxwell and Ian Maxwell, and Ghislaine Maxwell. Her mother stated that all of her children were brought up Anglican. From 1960, her family resided at Headington Hill Hall, where the offices to Robert Maxwell's Pergamon Press were located.

After attending senior school at Milham Ford School in Oxford, England, in 1969, she entered Pitzer College, Claremont, California, from which she received the degree of Bachelor of Arts with a major in Latin American Studies and Sociology in May 1972.

In September 1973, Maxwell entered Lady Spencer Churchill College of Education (now part of Oxford Brookes University). She graduated in June 1974 with a Post-Graduate Teaching Certificate. Maxwell later earned a master's degree in Interdisciplinary Studies from the University of Texas at Dallas.

== Career ==
Maxwell was an editor for Pergamon Press Publishers, in the early 1970s.

According to Tatler, Maxwell spent most of the 1970s and 1980s working for her father, which included running the West Coast office of Pergamon Press and involvement in one of his software acquisitions.

From September 1974 to June 1976, Maxwell worked as a middle-school teacher at Shepherd's Hill Middle School in Blackbird Leys, Oxford.

In the late 1970s, she became a school editor for A. Wheaton & Company in Exeter, England. Maxwell is the author of The Pergamon Dictionary of Perfect Spelling, first published by Pergamon Press Ltd. in 1977. The book became an international bestseller, proving valuable for dyslexic learners. Maxwell rewrote and updated the book in 2005. Her book has been republished several times: in 2005 under the title Dictionary of Perfect Spelling by Barrington Stoke Publishers, in 2007 under the title Spell it Right by Berlitz, and most recently as the School Spelling Dictionary in 2012 by Barrington Stoke.

=== Information technology ===
Maxwell became a resident of the San Francisco Bay Area in 1979.

In 1982, Maxwell acquired Information on Demand, one of the earliest information brokers, which was later renamed Research on Demand.

Maxwell is the creator and co-founder of Magellan, one of the first professionally curated online search/reference guides to Internet content. In 1992, she created and co-authored one of the first hard-copy reference guides to the Internet: New Riders Official Internet Yellow Pages and The McKinley Internet Yellow Pages; both published by Macmillan Publishers in 1994 and 1995 respectively.

After Magellan was acquired by competing search engine Excite, in 1996, she co-founded Chiliad: a software company involved in the advance of on-demand, massively scalable, intelligent mining of structured and unstructured data through the use of natural language search technologies. The firm's software was behind the data search technology used by the FBI's counterterrorism data warehouse. As of August 2019, Maxwell was a board director of Chiliad, Inc.

She is the Program Manager of Learning Technologies at The University of Texas at Dallas where she is also involved in Special Projects for Information Resources.

Maxwell is a former Trustee for Vint Cerf's Internet Society and The Santa Fe Institute.

She is on the boards of the International Center for Disability Resources on the Internet and Leonardo/OLATS.

In 2011, she was appointed an IPv6 Fellow of the Internet Protocol version 6 Forum in recognition of her contributions to support the promotion, deployment, and technology advantages of version 6 around the world.

== Other activities ==
Maxwell was appointed director of The Environment4Change Foundation, a London-based environmental consulting organization, in June 2019.

== Personal life ==
In June 1986, she married physicist and educator Roger Malina of Berkeley, California. Maxwell and Malina have three children. Maxwell has a second residence in France in Meyreuil, a village near Aix-en-Provence.
