= Ian Maxwell =

British businessman (born June 1956)

- Born: 1956 (age 69–70); Maisons-Laffitte, France
- Education: University of Oxford
- Occupation: Business
- Spouses: Laura Marie Plumb (m. 1991; div. 1996) Tara Dudley Smith (m. 1999)
- Parent(s): Robert Maxwell; Elisabeth Maxwell
- Relatives: Kevin Maxwell (brother); Christine Maxwell (sister); Isabel Maxwell (sister); Ghislaine Maxwell (sister)

Ian Maxwell (born 1956) is a British businessman and co-founder of the think tank Combating Jihadist Terrorism. In the 1990s, Maxwell was acquitted of charges of criminal financial malpractice relating to the business practices of his father, publishing tycoon Robert Maxwell.

== Early life and education ==
Maxwell, born June 1956 in Maisons-Laffitte, France, is the son of Elisabeth (née Meynard), a French-born scholar, and Robert Maxwell, a Czechoslovak-born media mogul. His father was Jewish and his mother was a French Protestant of Huguenot descent. He is one of nine siblings, of which two died in childhood. These include sisters Isabel, Christine, Anne and Ghislaine, and brother Kevin. The family moved to Headington Hill Hall in 1960.

Ian Maxwell was educated at Summer Fields School, Marlborough College and Oxford University.

== Career ==
Maxwell's first involvement in his father's business was at Pergamon Press from 1978 to 1983. After a short time at the Prince's Charitable Trust, he rejoined the Maxwell business, this time at British Printing and Communications Corporation (later renamed Maxwell Communications Corporation). In 1984, he became chairman of Derby County, and also was vice-chairman after his father became chairman in 1987. In 1991, it was reported that Maxwell worked for The European.

Ian Maxwell was appointed chairman of Mirror Group Newspapers plc (MGN) following the death of his father on 5 November 1991. For the next month, the group was the subject of speculation regarding its financial position. On 3 December 1991, Maxwell and his brother Kevin resigned from the board of Maxwell Communication Corporation and nine hours later resigned from MGN, following the disclosure that "many million" of pounds had been transferred from the Mirror Group pension fund to Robert Maxwell's private companies apparently without due authority. MGN announced: "Because of increasing conflicts of interest, Ian Maxwell, chairman and publisher of MGN, Kevin Maxwell, and Michael Stoney, who has a major management involvement in the Maxwell private companies, have today resigned from the board of MGN and its subsidiaries and have also ceased their executive duties in the MGN Group."

On 19 June 1992, Ian Maxwell, Kevin Maxwell, and their financial advisor Larry Trachtenberg were arrested and charged with conspiracy to defraud others of millions of dollars. In January 1996, all three were acquitted.

In 1995, Maxwell was involved with Maximov Publications, a company with a focus on content about Russia and the Soviet Union's former republics.

The Scotsman reported in 2001 that Maxwell was a director of 31 companies and also worked for Westbourne Communications, a public relations firm which represented Telemonde.

Maxwell announced in September 2018 that he and his brother Kevin had founded a UK think tank, Combating Jihadist Terrorism (CoJit), with the aim of better understanding terrorism and its causes. As of 2020, Maxwell was CoJit's director.

== Personal life ==
In 1991, Maxwell married Laura Marie Plumb, a television executive, born in Chicago, currently a Vedic scholar and practitioner of Ayurveda, Jyotish, and yoga. They announced their separation in 1996, and the pair later divorced. Maxwell remarried in 1999 to Tara Dudley Smith.

In July 2020, Maxwell's youngest sister, Ghislaine, was arrested and charged in New Hampshire with six federal crimes, involving minors' trade, travel, and seduction to engage in criminal sexual activity, and conspiracy to entice children to engage in illegal sex acts, linked to a sex trafficking ring with her close friend and partner Jeffrey Epstein (who had already died in jail the previous year). She was convicted on 29 December 2021, and sentenced to 20 years in prison on 28 June 2022. In January 2023, Ian disputed Virginia Giuffre's allegations against Prince Andrew, Duke of York by releasing photos showing his acquaintances sitting in the bathtub where the incident allegedly took place. The photos were originally reserved as a defence for Ghislaine's legal team if Giuffre was asked to testify. Ian said the photos "show conclusively that the bath is too small for any sort of sex frolicking. There is no 'Victorian bath', as Giuffre had claimed, which is proved both by the attached plan of the bathroom and the photos themselves."
