= Robert Maxwell =

British media proprietor (1923–1991)

Robert Maxwell MC
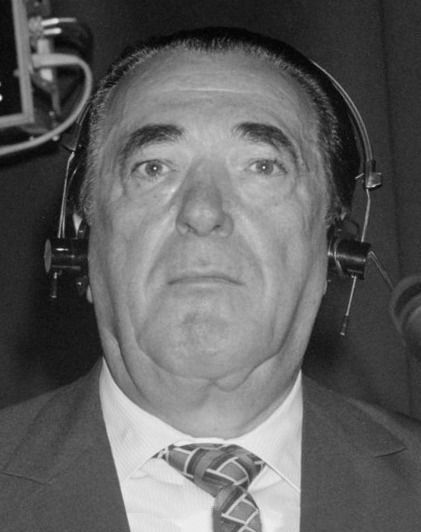
- Maxwell at the Global Economic Panel in Amsterdam (1989)

Member of Parliament for Buckingham
- In office 15 October 1964 – 29 May 1970
- Preceded by: Sir Frank Markham
- Succeeded by: Sir Bill Benyon

Personal details
- Born: Ján Ludvík Hyman Binyamin Hoch; 10 June 1923 Slatinské Doly, Czechoslovakia
- Died: 5 November 1991 (aged 68) Atlantic Ocean near the Canary Islands, Spain
- Resting place: Mount of Olives Jewish Cemetery, Jerusalem
- Citizenship: Czechoslovak; Israeli; French; British (from 1946)
- Party: Labour
- Spouse: Elisabeth Meynard (m. 1945)
- Children: 9, including Christine, Isabel, Ian, Kevin and Ghislaine
- Occupation: Publisher; media proprietor; Businessman

Military service
- Branch/service: Czechoslovak Army; British Army
- Years of service: 1940–1945
- Rank: Captain
- Battles/wars: World War II
- Awards: Military Cross

Ian Robert Maxwell (born Ján Ludvík Hyman Binyamin Hoch; 10 June 1923 – 5 November 1991) was a Czechoslovak-born British-French media proprietor and politician.

Of Jewish descent, he escaped the Nazi occupation of his native Czechoslovakia and joined the Czechoslovak Army in exile during the Second World War. He was decorated after active service in the British Army. In subsequent years he worked in publishing, building up Pergamon Press to a major academic publisher. After serving as a Labour member of Parliament from 1964 to 1970, Maxwell again put all his energy into business, successively buying the British Printing Corporation, Mirror Group Newspapers (MGN) and Macmillan Inc., among other publishing companies.

Maxwell led a flamboyant life, living in Headington Hill Hall in Oxford, from which he often flew in his helicopter, or sailed on his luxury yacht, Lady Ghislaine, named after his daughter Ghislaine. He was litigious and often embroiled in controversy. In 1989 he had to sell successful businesses, including Pergamon Press, to cover some of his debts. In 1991 his body was discovered floating in the Atlantic Ocean, near the Canary Islands, having apparently fallen overboard from his yacht. He was buried on the Mount of Olives in Jerusalem in a high-profile funeral attended by members of the Israeli political establishment, including Prime Minister Yitzhak Shamir, President Chaim Herzog, and dignitaries like Natan Sharansky.

Maxwell's death triggered the collapse of his publishing empire as banks called in loans. His sons briefly attempted to keep the business together, but failed as the news emerged that the elder Maxwell had embezzled hundreds of millions of pounds from his own companies' pension funds. The Maxwell companies applied for bankruptcy protection in 1992. After Maxwell's death, large discrepancies in his companies' finances were revealed, including his fraudulent misappropriation of the Mirror Group pension fund. His daughter Ghislaine was convicted in 2021 for trafficking young girls to the financier and child sex offender Jeffrey Epstein.

== Early life ==
Robert Maxwell was born Ján Ludvík Hyman Binyamin Hoch on 10 June 1923 in the small town of Slatinské Doly on the border with Romania, in the region of Carpathian Ruthenia in Czechoslovakia (now Solotvyno, Ukraine). His parents were poor Yiddish-speaking Orthodox Jews, and Ludvik was the third of their seven children; another brother and sister died in infancy. At birth, Maxwell's father, Mechel Hoch, gave his son the first names Abraham Lajbi but during registration at the town hall, the attending clerk insisted that the name had to be Czech, so he instead chose the names Ján Ludvík. For most of his early life, Maxwell went by Ludvík, though often still called Lajbi by his family, rendering his name as "Jan Ludwig" during World War II.

Like the rest of the then-newly formed Czechoslovakia, the area of Maxwell's birth and upbringing had been part of Austria-Hungary until early November 1918. During this time until just before his birth (1919), the family name had been not Ludvik but Hoch, as per Austro-Hungarian census and registration. The area would later be annexed by Hungary during World War II before being part of the Soviet Union in 1945.

Maxwell's family originated from Maramureș. Maxwell's authorised biography states that he was also a distant relative of Elie Wiesel, but The Dispatch claimed they could find nothing to substantiate such a claim.

Maxwell described his parents as peasant farm labourers, with his father reportedly also serving as a shochet, also working as woodcutter and cattle wholesaler to tanners and butchers. Maxwell's maternal grandfather, Yaacov Schlomovitch, was a merchant who taught his grandson about trading, also using the family home to smuggle alcohol. At the suggestion of his mother, as the eldest son, Maxwell underwent schooling at a yeshiva, learning to read Yiddish, Hebrew, and Czech, with plans for him to become a rabbi. Afterwards, he attended school for three years between the ages of eight and eleven, learning to speak Czech and Russian in classes, as well as German from Carpathian German schoolmates.

== World War II ==
In 1938, at age 15, when Germany invaded Czechoslovakia, Maxwell's parents had him quit his job as a salesman and sent him to Budapest. Some biographers claim that Maxwell walked the 443 kilometres (275 mi) on foot while others state that he travelled by train. After briefly living with friends, he disappeared without notice, with Maxwell giving several conflicting accounts, such as that he became a courier for the Czech resistance, which Tom Bower stated had no presence in the city at the time. In May 1940, he joined the Czechoslovak Army in exile in Marseille. Most of Maxwell's relatives were deported to Auschwitz and perished there after Hungary's occupation by Nazi Germany in 1944. Years earlier, Maxwell had escaped to France, with only him and two sisters surviving the Holocaust.

After the fall of France and the British retreat to Britain, Maxwell (using the name "Ivan du Maurier", or "Leslie du Maurier", the surname taken from the cigarette brand Du Maurier) took part in a protest against the leadership of the Czechoslovak Army, and with 500 other soldiers he was transferred to the British Army, initially to the Royal Pioneer Corps and later to the North Staffordshire Regiment in 1943. He was then involved in action across Europe, from the Normandy beaches to Berlin, and achieved the rank of sergeant. Maxwell gained a commission in 1945 and was promoted to the rank of captain.

In January 1945, Maxwell's heroism in "storming a German machine-gun nest" won him the Military Cross (MC), presented by Field Marshal Sir Bernard Law Montgomery. Attached to the Foreign Office, he worked in Berlin during the next two years in the press section. Maxwell naturalised as a British subject on 19 June 1946 and changed his name to Ian Robert Maxwell by deed of change of name on 30 June 1948.

In 1945, Maxwell married Elisabeth "Betty" Meynard, a French Protestant, and the couple had nine children over the next sixteen years: Michael, Philip, Ann, Christine, Isabel, Karine, Ian, Kevin, and Ghislaine. In a 1995 interview, Elisabeth talked of how they were recreating Maxwell's childhood family who did not survive the Holocaust. Five of his children—Christine, Isabel, Ian, Kevin and Ghislaine—were later employed within his companies. Karine died of leukaemia at age three, while Michael was severely injured in a car crash in 1961, at age 15, when his driver fell asleep at the wheel and crashed headlong into another vehicle. Michael never regained consciousness and died seven years later.

== Career ==
After the war, Maxwell used contacts in the Allied-occupation authorities to go into business, becoming the British and US distributor for Springer Verlag, a publisher of scientific books. In 1951, he bought three-quarters of Butterworth-Springer, a minor publisher; the remaining quarter was held by the experienced scientific editor Paul Rosbaud. They changed the name of the company to Pergamon Press and rapidly built it into a major academic publishing house. After a disagreement with Maxwell, Rosbaud left in 1956.

In the 1964 general election, representing the Labour Party, Maxwell was elected as Member of Parliament (MP) for Buckingham and re-elected in 1966. He gave an interview to The Times in 1968 in which he said the House of Commons provided him with a problem. "I can't get on with men", he commented. "I tried having male assistants at first. But it didn't work. They tend to be too independent. Men like to have individuality. Women can become an extension of the boss." Maxwell lost his seat in 1970 to Conservative challenger William Benyon. He contested Buckingham again in both 1974 general elections, but without success.

At the beginning of 1969, it emerged that Maxwell's attempt to buy the tabloid newspaper News of the World had failed. The Carr family, which owned the newspaper, was incensed at the thought of a Czechoslovak immigrant with socialist views gaining ownership. The board voted against Maxwell's bid without any dissent. The News of the World's editor, Stafford Somerfield, opposed Maxwell's bid in an October 1968 front-page opinion piece in which he referred to Maxwell's Czechoslovak origins and used his birth name. He wrote, "This is a British paper, run by British people ... as British as roast beef and Yorkshire pudding ... Let us keep it that way". The paper was later purchased by the Australian tycoon Rupert Murdoch, who later that year acquired The Sun, which had also previously interested Maxwell.

== Pergamon lost and regained ==
In 1969, Saul Steinberg, head of "Leasco Data Processing Corporation", was interested in a strategic acquisition of Pergamon Press. Steinberg claimed that during negotiations, Maxwell falsely stated that a subsidiary responsible for publishing encyclopedias was extremely profitable. At the same time, Pergamon had been forced to reduce its profit forecasts for 1969 from £2.5 million to £2.05 million during the period of negotiations, and dealing in Pergamon shares was suspended on the London stock markets.

Maxwell subsequently lost control of Pergamon and was expelled from the board in October 1969, along with three other directors in sympathy with him, by the majority owners of the company's shares. Steinberg purchased Pergamon. An inquiry by the Department of Trade and Industry (DTI) under the Takeover Code of the time was conducted by Rondle Owen Charles Stable and Sir Ronald Leach in mid-1971. The inquiry resulted in a report that concluded: "We regret having to conclude that, notwithstanding Mr Maxwell's acknowledged abilities and energy, he is not in our opinion a person who can be relied on to exercise proper stewardship of a publicly quoted company." It was found that Maxwell had contrived to inflate Pergamon's share price through transactions between his private family companies.

At the same time, the United States Congress was investigating Leasco's takeover practices. Judge Thayne Forbes in September 1971 was critical of the inquiry: "They had moved from an inquisitorial role to accusatory one and virtually committed the business murder of Mr. Maxwell." He further continued that the trial judge would probably find that the inspectors had acted "contrary to the rules of natural justice". Pergamon performed poorly under Steinberg; Maxwell reacquired the company in 1974 after borrowing funds.

Maxwell established the Maxwell Foundation in Liechtenstein in 1970. He acquired the British Printing Corporation (BPC) in 1981 and changed its name first to the British Printing and Communication Corporation (BPCC) and then to the Maxwell Communication Corporation (MCC). The company was later sold in a management buyout and is now known as Polestar.

== Later business activities ==
In July 1984, Maxwell acquired Mirror Group Newspapers, the publisher of six British newspapers, including the Daily Mirror, from Reed International plc. for £113 million. This led to a media war between Maxwell and Murdoch, the proprietor of the News of the World and The Sun. Mirror Group Newspapers (formerly Trinity Mirror, now part of Reach plc), published the Daily Mirror, a pro-Labour tabloid; Sunday Mirror; Sunday People; Sunday Mail and Daily Record in Scotland. At a press conference to publicise his acquisition, Maxwell said his editors would be "free to produce the news without interference". Meanwhile, at a meeting of Maxwell's new employees, Mirror journalist Joe Haines asserted that he was able to prove that their boss was "a crook and a liar". Haines quickly came under Maxwell's influence and later wrote his authorised biography.

In June 1985, Maxwell announced a takeover of Clive Sinclair's ailing home computer company, Sinclair Research, through Hollis Brothers, a Pergamon subsidiary. The deal was aborted in August 1985. In 1987, Maxwell purchased part of IPC Media to create Fleetway Publications. The same year, he launched the London Daily News in February after a delay caused by production problems, but the paper closed in July after sustaining significant losses contemporary estimates put at £25 million. Originally intending it to be a rival of the Evening Standard, Maxwell eventually decided to make it the first 24-hour paper as well.

In May 1987, Maxwell's BPCC made an unsolicited bid to acquire US publishing conglomerate Harcourt Brace Jovanovich (HBJ). HBJ defended itself from the hostile takeover attempt by going deeply into debt to make large cash payments to shareholders. The strain of the debt was a factor in HBJ's 1989 sale of its theme park holdings to Anheuser-Busch. These theme park assets included the SeaWorld chain, which the company had purchased in 1976.

By 1988, Maxwell's various companies owned, in addition to the Mirror titles and Pergamon Press, Nimbus Records, Maxwell Directories, Prentice Hall Information Services and the Berlitz language schools. He also owned a half-share of MTV in Europe and other European television interests, Maxwell Cable TV and Maxwell Entertainment. Maxwell purchased Macmillan Inc, the American firm, for $2.6 billion in 1988. That same year, he launched an ambitious new project, a transnational newspaper called The European. In 1991, Maxwell was forced to sell Pergamon and Maxwell Directories to Elsevier for £440 million to cover his debts; he used some of this money to buy an ailing tabloid, the New York Daily News. The same year Maxwell sold forty-nine per cent of Mirror Group's stock to the public.

Maxwell's links with Eastern European Communist regimes resulted in several biographies of those countries' leaders, with interviews conducted by Maxwell, for which he received much derision. At the beginning of an interview with Romania's Nicolae Ceaușescu, then the country's communist leader, he asked: "How do you account for your enormous popularity with the Romanian people?"

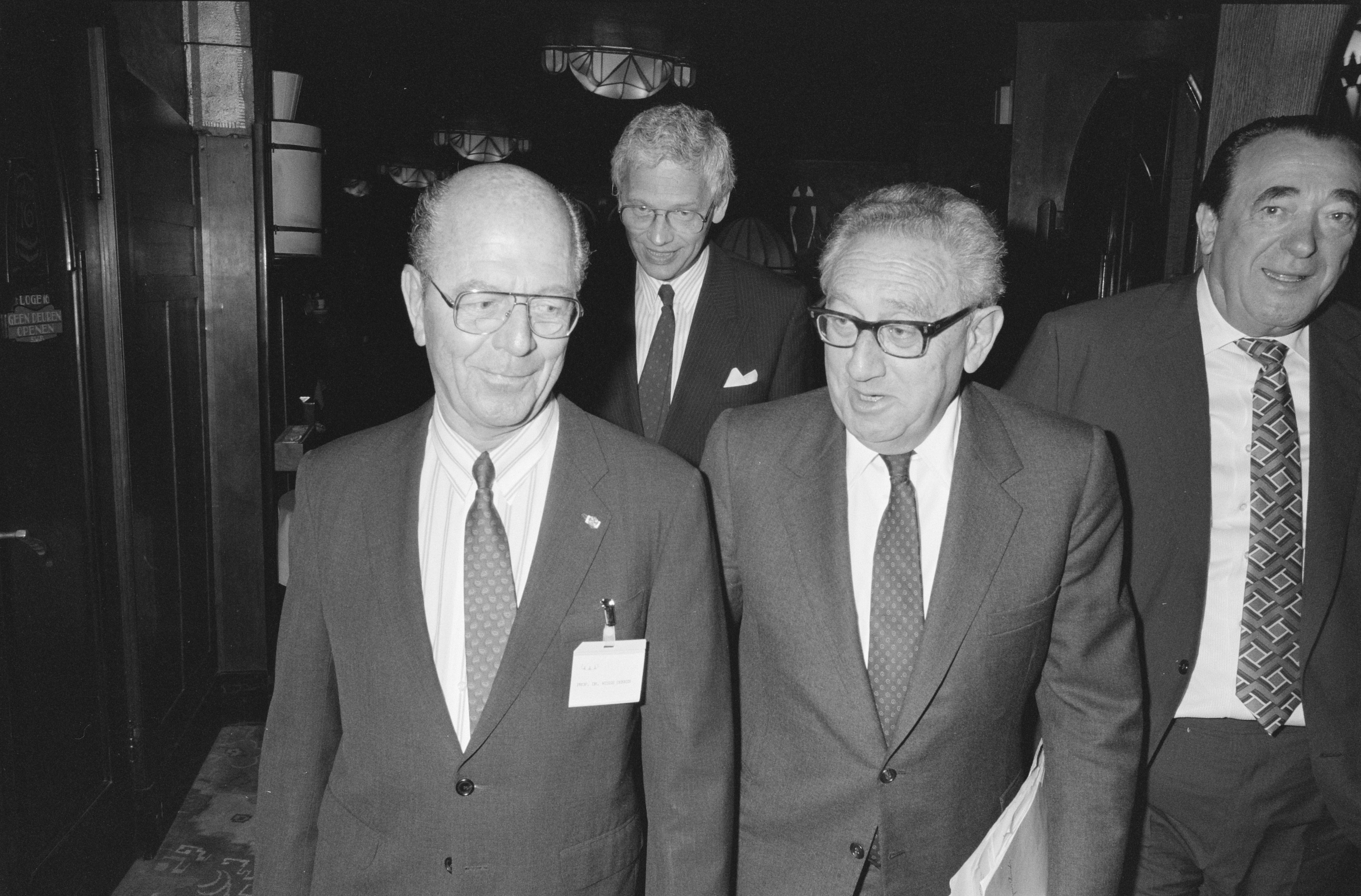
Global Economic Panel April 1989 in Amsterdam: Wisse Dekker, minister Hans van den Broek, Henry Kissinger and Robert Maxwell

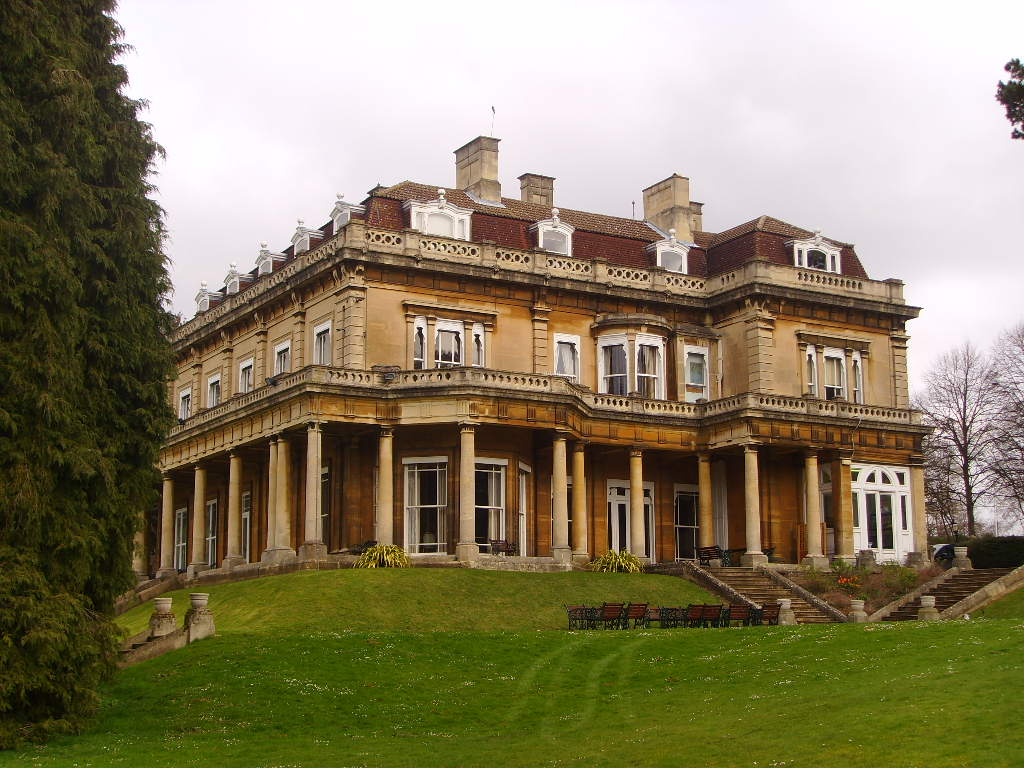
For the last 32 years of his life, Maxwell lived at Headington Hill Hall, which he rented from Oxford City Council and described as "the best council house" in the country. It is now part of Oxford Brookes University.

Maxwell was also the chairman of Oxford United, saving them from bankruptcy and attempting to merge them with Reading in 1983 to form a club he wished to call "Thames Valley Royals". He took Oxford into the top flight of English football in 1985, and the team won the League Cup a year later. Maxwell used the club's old grounds, close to his office at Headington Hill Hall, to land his helicopter; fans would chant: "He's fat, he's round, he's never on the ground". Maxwell also bought into Derby County in 1987. He attempted to buy Manchester United in 1984 but refused owner Martin Edwards's asking price.

Pergamon Press, a Soviet-friendly firm, published numerous Soviet science books in the West. A bugged version of the case management software PROMIS was allegedly sold in the mid-1980s for Soviet government use, with Maxwell as a conduit.

Maxwell was known to be litigious against those who would speak or write against him. The satirical magazine Private Eye lampooned him as "Cap'n Bob" and the "bouncing Czech", the latter nickname having originally been devised by Prime Minister Harold Wilson (under whom Maxwell was an MP). Maxwell took out several libel actions against Private Eye, one resulting in the magazine losing an estimated £225,000 and Maxwell using his commercial power to hit back with a one-off spoof magazine called Not Private Eye.

== Israeli espionage career ==
=== 1948 war ===
A hint of Maxwell's service to Israel was provided by John Loftus and Mark Aarons, who described Maxwell's contacts with Czechoslovak communist leaders in 1948 as crucial to the Czechoslovak decision to arm Israel in the 1948 Arab–Israeli War. Czechoslovak military assistance was both unique and crucial for Israel in the conflict. According to Loftus and Aarons, it was Maxwell's covert help in smuggling aircraft parts into Israel that led to the country having air supremacy during the war.

=== Distribution of PROMIS software to facilitate Israeli spying ===
Maxwell is alleged to have distributed a bugged version of a software, PROMIS, to a plethora of national governments and global financial institutions that enabled mass spying by the government of Israel.

Maxwell was allegedly able to sell the bugged Israeli version of the PROMIS software to Sandia National Laboratories and Los Alamos National Laboratory, two of the most important nuclear research and national security facilities in the United States. Maxwell allegedly employed John Tower, Chairman of the United States Senate Committee on Armed Services, to facilitate the sales of the bugged Israeli version of the PROMIS software to Sandia and Los Alamos.

=== Spy allegations; Vanunu case ===
Robert Maxwell has been suspected of having ties to multiple intelligence agencies, including the British MI6, the Soviet KGB, and the Israeli Mossad. The British Foreign Office suspected Maxwell of being a secret agent of a foreign government, possibly a double agent or a triple agent, and "a thoroughly bad character and almost certainly financed by Russia".

Shortly before Maxwell's death, Ari Ben-Menashe, a former employee of Israel's Military Intelligence Directorate, approached a number of news organisations in Britain and the US with the allegation that Maxwell and the Daily Mirror's foreign editor, Nicholas Davies, were both long-time agents for Mossad. Ben-Menashe also claimed that, in 1986, Maxwell informed the Israeli Embassy in London that Mordechai Vanunu revealed information about Israel's nuclear capability to The Sunday Times, then to the Daily Mirror. Vanunu was subsequently kidnapped by Mossad and smuggled to Israel, convicted of treason and imprisoned for eighteen years.

Journalist Seymour Hersh of The New Yorker repeated some of the allegations during a press conference in London held to publicise The Samson Option, Hersh's book about Israel's nuclear weapons. On 21 October 1991, Labour MP George Galloway and Conservative MP Rupert Allason (also known as espionage author Nigel West) agreed to raise the issue in the House of Commons under parliamentary privilege protection, (Note: Parliamentary privilege allows MPs to ask questions in Parliament without risk of being sued for defamation.) which in turn allowed British newspapers to report events without fear of libel suits. Maxwell called the claims "ludicrous, a total invention" and fired Davies. The Washington Post reported that sources in Britain and Israel disputed Hersh's claims. A year later, in Galloway's libel settlement against Mirror Group Newspapers, Galloway's counsel announced that the MP accepted that the group's staff had not been involved in Vanunu's abduction. Galloway referred to Maxwell as "one of the worst criminals of the century".

== Death ==
On 4 November 1991, Maxwell had an argumentative phone call with his son Kevin over a meeting scheduled with the Bank of England on Maxwell's default on £50 million in loans. Maxwell missed the meeting, instead travelling on his yacht, the Lady Ghislaine, to the Canary Islands, Spain. On 5 November, Maxwell was last in contact with the crew of Lady Ghislaine at 4:25 a.m. local time, but was found to be missing later in the morning. It has been speculated that Maxwell was urinating into the ocean nude at the time, as he often did. He was presumed to have fallen overboard from the vessel, which was cruising off the Canary Islands, south-west of Spain. Maxwell's naked body was recovered from the Atlantic Ocean and taken to Las Palmas. Besides a "graze to his left shoulder", there were no noticeable wounds on Maxwell's body.

The official ruling at an inquest held in December 1991 was death by a heart attack combined with accidental drowning, although three pathologists had been unable to agree on the cause of his death at the inquest; he had been found to suffer from serious heart and lung conditions. Murder was ruled out by the judge and, in effect, so was suicide. His son discounted the possibility of suicide, saying, "I think it is highly unlikely that he would have taken his own life, it wasn't in his makeup or his mentality." Maxwell was afforded a lavish funeral in Israel, attended by Israeli Prime Minister Yitzhak Shamir, Israeli President Chaim Herzog, at least six serving and former heads of Israeli intelligence and many dignitaries and politicians, both government and opposition, and was buried on the Mount of Olives in Jerusalem. Herzog delivered the eulogy, and the Kaddish was recited by his friend and longtime attorney Samuel Pisar.

British Prime Minister John Major said Maxwell had given him "valuable insights" into the situation in the Soviet Union during the attempted coup of 1991. He was a "great character", Major added. Neil Kinnock, then Labour Party leader, spoke of him as a man with "a zest for life" who "attracted controversy, envy and loyalty in great measure throughout his rumbustious life". A production crew conducting research for Maxwell, a 2007 biographical film by the BBC, uncovered tapes stored in a suitcase owned by his former head of security, John Pole. Apparently, later in his life, Maxwell had become increasingly paranoid about his own employees and had the offices of those he suspected of disloyalty bugged so he could hear their conversations.

=== Aftermath of Maxwell's death ===
Maxwell's death triggered instability for his publishing empire, with banks frantically calling in their massive loans. Despite the efforts of his sons Kevin and Ian, the Maxwell companies soon collapsed. It emerged that, without adequate prior authorisation, Maxwell had used hundreds of millions of pounds from his companies' pension funds to shore up the shares of the Mirror Group to save his companies from bankruptcy. Eventually, the pension funds were replenished with money from investment banks Lehman Brothers, Coopers & Lybrand, and Goldman Sachs, as well as the British government.

This replenishment was limited and also supported by a surplus in the printers' fund, which was taken by the government in part payment of £100 million required to support the workers' state pensions. The rest of the £100 million was waived. Maxwell's theft of pension funds was therefore partly repaid from public funds. The result was that in general, pensioners received about half of their company pension entitlement. The Maxwell companies filed for bankruptcy protection in 1992. Kevin Maxwell was declared bankrupt with debts of £400 million. In 1995, Kevin, Ian and two other former directors went on trial for conspiracy to defraud, but were unanimously acquitted by a 12-person jury the following year.

== Family ==
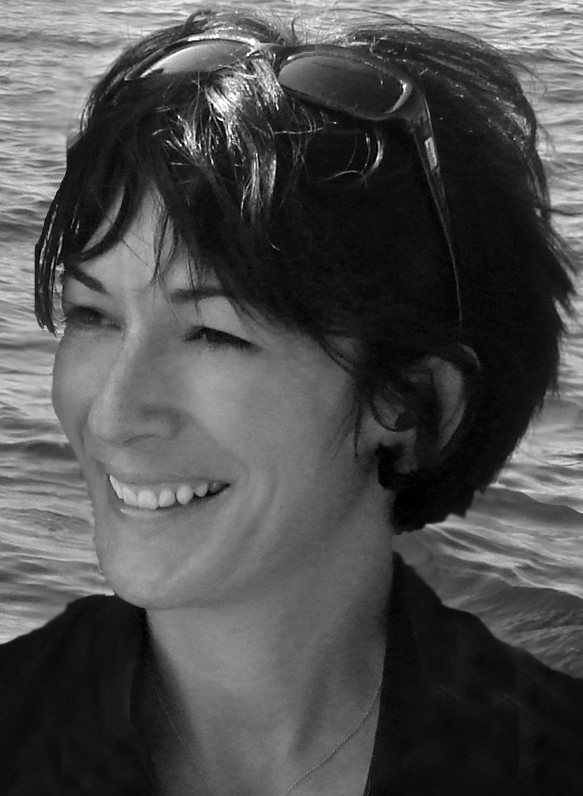
Ghislaine Maxwell (2007)

In November 1994, Maxwell's widow Elisabeth published her memoirs, A Mind of My Own: My Life with Robert Maxwell, which sheds light on her life with him, when the publishing magnate was ranked as one of the richest people in the world. Having earned her degree from Oxford University in 1981, Elisabeth devoted much of her later life to continued research on the Holocaust and worked as a proponent of Jewish-Christian dialogue. She died on 7 August 2013.

In July 2020, Maxwell's youngest child, his daughter Ghislaine Maxwell, was arrested and charged in New Hampshire with six federal crimes, involving minors' trade, travel, and seduction to engage in criminal sexual activity, and conspiracy to entice children to engage in illegal sex acts, linked to a sex trafficking ring with her close friend and partner Jeffrey Epstein (who had already died in jail the previous year). She was convicted on 29 December 2021, and sentenced to 20 years in prison on 28 June 2022.

== In popular culture ==
- In the 1992 final series of the British sitcom The New Statesman, a recurring joke is Alan B'Stard's knowledge that Maxwell faked his death and is still alive. In the fifth episode, B'Stard visits war-torn Herzegovina, ostensibly to negotiate a peace treaty, but his plan all along has been to smuggle Maxwell out of the country to a luxury hideaway, in return for a handsome slice of the Mirror Group funds. It transpires, however, that Maxwell has already spent the money, and the episode ends with a vengeful B'Stard giving him "an amazing déjà-vu experience" by pushing him over the side of his yacht, where he presumably dies.
- In Carol Ann Duffy's 1993 poetry collection Mean Time, the poem "Fraud" is a dramatic monologue from the perspective of Robert Maxwell, which explores his scandals.
- The Fourth Estate, a 1996 novel by Jeffrey Archer, is based on the lives of Robert Maxwell and Rupert Murdoch.
- Maxwell, in addition to Ted Turner and Rupert Murdoch, was used as inspiration for the villainous media baron Elliot Carver in the 1997 James Bond film Tomorrow Never Dies, as well as its novelisation and video game adaptation. At the film's conclusion, M orders a story spun disguising Carver's demise at Bond's hands, saying that Carver is believed to have committed suicide by jumping off his yacht in the South China Sea.
- A one-person show about Maxwell's life, Lies Have Been Told, written by Rod Beacham, was performed by Phillip York at London's Trafalgar Studios in 2006.
- Max, a 2006 novel by Juval Aviv, is based on Aviv's investigation into the death of Robert Maxwell.
- A BBC drama, Maxwell, covering his life shortly before his death, starring David Suchet and Patricia Hodge, was aired on 4 May 2007. Suchet won the International Emmy Award for Best Actor for his performance as Maxwell.
- Maxwell pressured Soviet leader Mikhail Gorbachev to cancel the contract between Elorg and Nintendo concerning the rights to the game Tetris, as he believed that his software company Mirrorsoft already owned the rights. In the 2023 film Tetris, which deals with the legal battles surrounding the game, Maxwell is portrayed by Roger Allam.
- Succession creator Jesse Armstrong has stated that Maxwell's biography Maxwell: The Final Verdict was an influence in creating the series.
- Maxwell and his daughter Ghislaine served as inspiration for the characters of Charles Hanani and Yasmin Kara-Hanani in the British drama television series Industry.
- In May 2025, Maxwell was featured in two episodes of the podcast Behind the Bastards.

== See also ==
- Ari Ben-Menashe
- Daily News (Perth, Western Australia) §1980–1990
- List of people who disappeared mysteriously at sea
- Maxwellisation – English and Scots civil law practice
- Scottish Daily News – Scottish newspaper published in 1975

== Citations ==
Parliament of the United Kingdom
Preceded by Frank Markham	Member of Parliament for Buckingham; 1964–1970	Succeeded by William Benyon
