= Jane Mulvagh =

Jane Mulvagh is an Irish-born journalist and social historian, specialising in British history. She is best known for her history of Madresfield Court, the English country house upon which Evelyn Waugh based his novel Brideshead Revisited.

== Early life and career ==
Mulvagh has Irish roots and was educated at an English convent before going up to Girton College, Cambridge, to read history. Her early interest in fashion history led to eight years at Vogue, as a fashion historian and features writer. Mulvagh completed the Vogue History of Twentieth Century Fashion (Viking Penguin) in 1988. She left Vogue the following year and subsequently wrote a regular column in the Financial Times entitled "Me and my Wardrobe" and a monthly think-piece on style for that title.

== Later career ==
From February 1990 Mulvagh was a presenter and reporter for British Satellite Broadcasting, known as BSB, during its inaugural year. Working on the evening news and magazine show First Edition, Mulvagh produced three 7-minute pieces per week. She has made TV appearances on the BBC, Granada, RTE Dublin and BBC Radio 4.

Mulvagh has written on the history of design, art and social history for many British and American broadsheets, including The Daily Telegraph, The Times, The Art Newspaper, The Evening Standard, The European, The Independent, The Daily Mail, and magazines such as Very Magazine, Town & Country Magazine, Harper's Bazaar (Harpers & Queen), The European, The Spectator and Apollo. She contributed over 40 Obituaries for The Independent.

== Teaching and lecturing ==
From 1997 to 2002 Mulvagh taught an MA course in Fashion Journalism and Criticism at Central St Martins School of Art, now part of UAL. Her pupils included Financial Times fashion editor and stylist, Damian Foxe, Editor-in-Chief of Condé Nast online Abigail Chisman, and contemporary art gallerist Libby Sellers. Mulvagh delivered the thirteenth Annual Soane Lecture, on 13 November 2008, at Sir John Soane's Museum in London and The Royal Oak Foundation Annual Lecture Tour in the United States in 2009. She has lectured at Oxford University (Harris Manchester College), Cheltenham Literature Festival and the Oxford Literary Festival.

== Published works ==
- Madresfield: The Real Brideshead, Transworld, (2008) ISBN 0385607725,
- Vivienne Westwood, An Unfashionable Life, HarperCollins, (1998) ISBN 0002556251
- Newport Houses, Rizzoli USA (1989) ASIN B01A1M6KUA - an architectural history of Newport, Rhode Island USA
- Costume Jewellery in Vogue, Thames and Hudson (1988) ISBN 0500275130
- The Vogue History of Twentieth Century Fashion, Viking Penguin, London (1988) ISBN 0670801720
