= Isabel Maxwell =

French-born entrepreneur (born 1950)

- Born: 16 August 1950 (age 76); Maisons-Laffitte, France
- Education: St Hilda's College, Oxford; University of Edinburgh
- Occupation: Entrepreneur
- Spouses: Dale Djerassi (m. 1984; div. 1989) David Hayden (m. 1990; div. 1996)
- Partner: Al Seckel (2007–2015)
- Children: 1
- Parents: Robert Maxwell (father); Elisabeth Maxwell (mother)
- Relatives: Christine Maxwell (twin sister); Ghislaine Maxwell (sister); Kevin Maxwell (brother); Ian Maxwell (brother)

Isabel Sylvia Margaret Maxwell (born 16 August 1950) is a French-born entrepreneur and the co-founder of Magellan, an early search engine that was acquired by Excite. Maxwell has been listed as a Technology Pioneer of the World Economic Forum. She was the President of Commtouch, an Israeli internet company that became CYREN. She was a Director of Israel Venture Network and built up their Social Entrepreneur program in Israel from 2004–2010.

== Early life and education ==
Maxwell was born in Maisons Laffitte, France on 16 August 1950 along with her fraternal twin sister Christine Maxwell, to parents Elisabeth and Robert Maxwell. Her father, a Czechoslovak-born British media proprietor, was Jewish and her mother, a French-born Holocaust scholar, was of Huguenot descent. One of nine children, her siblings include brothers Kevin Maxwell and Ian Maxwell, and younger sister Ghislaine Maxwell. From 1960, her family lived at Headington Hill Hall where the offices to Robert Maxwell's Pergamon Press were located. Her mother stated that while all of her children were brought up Anglican, Isabel was "very taken by the Jewish faith and the politics in Israel."

Maxwell was a pupil at Milham Ford School, Oxford, going on to study at St Hilda's College, University of Oxford, graduating with an MA in Law, History, and French in 1972. She earned a master's degree in Education (French) from the University of Edinburgh, Scotland, before beginning her career in film and television production.

== Career ==
Maxwell opted out of working directly for her father.

=== Film and television ===
In 1973, Maxwell made her first film, an adaptation of the book Jonathan Livingston Seagull. Her second film, a documentary on lesbian women, was made in 1980 while at Southern Television in the UK.

In 1981, Maxwell relocated to the San Francisco Bay Area of California in the United States where she continued to produce and direct documentaries. In 1982, Maxwell wrote and directed Gray's Inn - A Fountain of Justice, narrated by Ludovic Kennedy.

Maxwell worked with Djerassi Films Inc. on collaborative projects with Dale Djerassi whom she married in 1984. They co-produced the feature film '68 (released in 1988 by New World Pictures) and the 1982 PBS documentary, Bhutan – A Strange Survival, introduced by Senator Charles H. Percy of Illinois and narrated by Ludovic Kennedy. Michael Aris, the late husband of Aung San Suu Kyi, was adviser and writer.

In 1990, Maxwell left the film industry, moved to Berkeley, and began to work with her sister Christine at an internet data company.

=== Magellan ===
Maxwell was a co-founder of the company behind early search engine Magellan. Isabel joined twin sister Christine Maxwell who was leading a small company called Research on Demand that was online in 1993". The company changed names to McKinley Group (named after North America’s highest mountain) and became a search engine with ratings. Maxwell was a senior vice president, her second husband, David Hayden, was CEO and her sister Christine was publisher. The Maxwell sisters launched the Magellan web search service in September 1995. In early 1996, the company was poised to IPO, but investment bank Robertson Stephens decided to put Excite on the market first. A few months later, IPOs became difficult and the startup company was running out of money. Magellan wanted to go public with Lehman doing the offering but was unsuccessful. Michael Wolff's book Burn Rate also describes a failed deal to combine with Wolff New Media, which shortly later went broke itself. With intensifying financial constraints, Maxwell’s husband was pushed out of the company by investors and her sister left. Isabel assumed the responsibility to dispose of the company. After a layoff, the firm was sold for $18 million (of stock) to competitor Excite.

=== Later technology leadership ===
Maxwell was the president of Commtouch Inc. (now CYREN), an Israeli and American e-mail messaging and security company, from 1997 to 2001. The company went public on NASDAQ in 1999. In 2014, the company changed its name to CYREN.

From 2003 to 2004, Maxwell was invited by Blumberg capital to become CEO of iCognito, renamed Puresight, an Israeli web content filtering software company. She turned the company around, and it was sold in 2005 to Boston Communications.

== Other interests ==
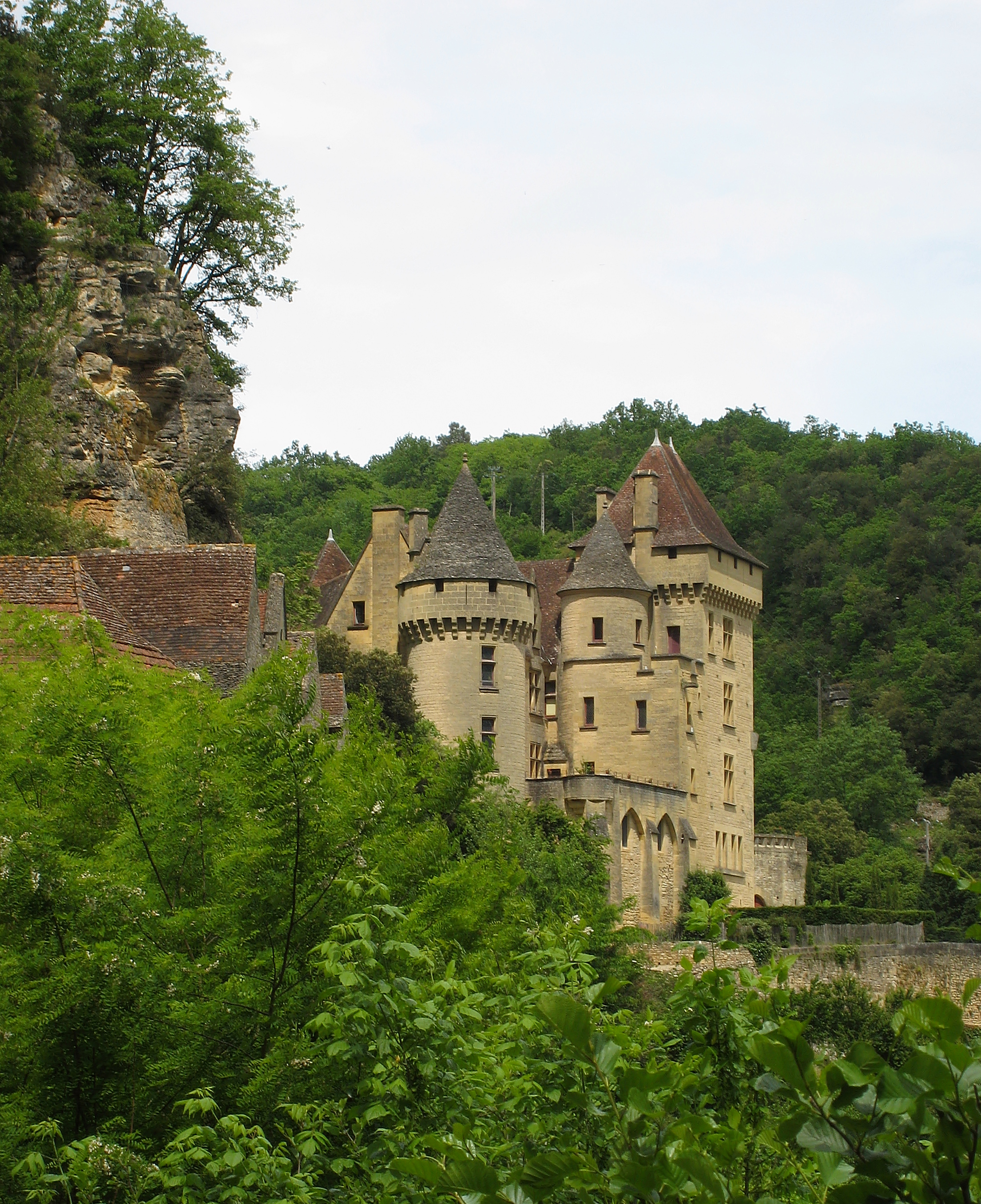
Chateau de la Malartrie in La Roque-Gageac

Maxwell was a member of Israel Venture Network (IVN), an organization founded in 2001 by Éric Benhamou. She was the chairperson of the IVN Social Entrepreneur Fellowship Program, from 2004-2010. She spoke on several occasions for and on behalf of IVN at conferences such as WEBBIT in Istanbul in Turkey.

Maxwell has been a director of the Peres center for peace and has also been involved in fundraising for Soroka Medical Center. She has been on the board of the American Friends of the Yitzhak Rabin Center.

== Personal life ==
In 1984, Maxwell married filmmaker Dale Djerassi, affiliate of the Djerassi Resident Artists Program and son of birth control pill inventor Carl Djerassi. Maxwell and Djerassi had one son, Alexander, born that same year. The couple later divorced, in 1989.

Maxwell married dot-com entrepreneur David Hayden in 1990. The marriage deteriorated in 1996 and later ended in divorce.

In 2007, Maxwell married Al Seckel. Maxwell and Seckel moved to France from Malibu, California, around 2010, to care for Maxwell's ailing mother. They lived in Chateau de la Malartrie in La Roque-Gageac. In November 2015, after Seckel's death, Maxwell was declared bankrupt by a British court.
