= Ghislaine Maxwell =

British socialite and child sex trafficker (born 1961)

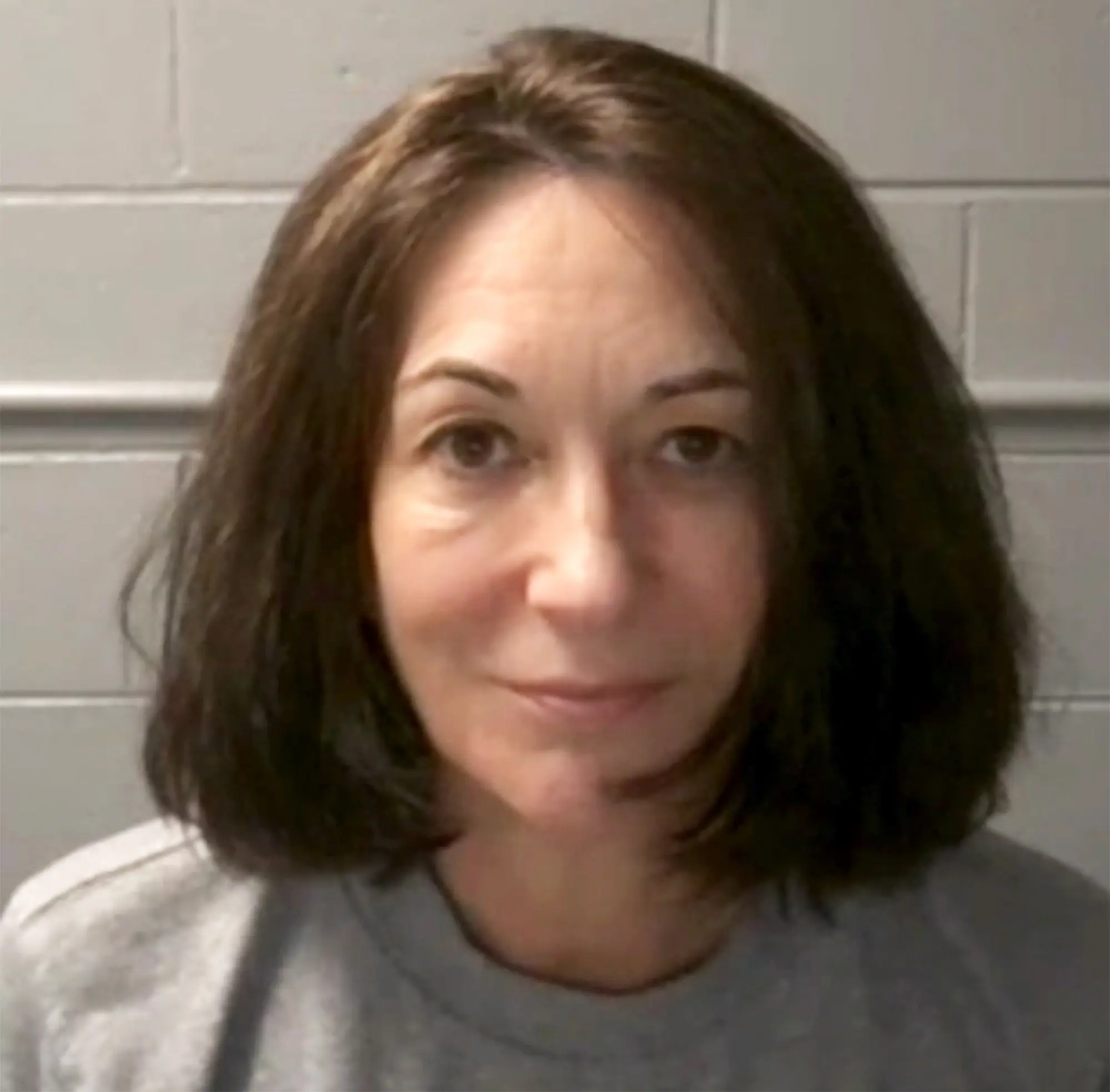
- Maxwell in a 2022 mug shot taken at the Metropolitan Detention Center, Brooklyn
- Born: 25 December 1961 (age 64); Maisons-Laffitte, Seine-et-Oise, France
- Citizenship: UK; France; US
- Education: Balliol College, Oxford
- Spouse: Scott Gerald Borgerson (m. 2016; div. 2021)
- Status: Incarcerated
- Convictions: Sex trafficking of a minor; Transporting a minor with the intent to engage in criminal sexual activity; Conspiracy (3 counts)
- Penalty: 20 years in US federal prison
- Accomplice: Jeffrey Epstein

Details
- Victims: 4+
- Date apprehended: 2 July 2020
- Imprisoned at: Federal Prison Camp, Bryan, Texas, US
- Organisation: TerraMar Project
- Parents: Elisabeth Maxwell; Robert Maxwell
- Relatives: 8 siblings, including Christine, Isabel, Ian and Kevin
- Ghislaine Maxwell's voice Recorded on 24 July 2025, in a proffer interview

Ghislaine Noelle Marion Maxwell (/ɡiːˈlɛn/ ghee-LEN; born 25 December 1961) is a British convicted child sex trafficker and former socialite. In 2021, she was convicted of child sex trafficking, and in 2022 was sentenced to 20 years in prison.

Born in France and raised in Oxford, England, she attended Balliol College, Oxford, in the 1980s and became a prominent member of London's social scene. She is a naturalised American citizen and retains both French and British citizenship. She worked for her father, the media proprietor Robert Maxwell, until his death in 1991; she then moved to New York City, where she continued living as a socialite and developed a close relationship with Jeffrey Epstein. Alongside Epstein, Maxwell maintained an extensive social network of prominent elites. Maxwell maintained friendships with Naomi Campbell, Prince Andrew, Bill Clinton and Kerry Kennedy.

In July 2020, Maxwell was arrested by the FBI in the United States following a federal indictment charging her with multiple offences, including conspiracy to entice minors and sex trafficking of minors to Jeffrey Epstein. She was denied bail. Her trial ran from 29 November until 29 December 2021 when she was convicted on five out of six counts, including one of sex trafficking of a minor.

== Early life ==
Ghislaine Noelle Marion Maxwell was born on 25 December 1961 in Maisons-Laffitte, a commune in the department of Seine-et-Oise, Île-de-France, France. Her first middle name ‘Noelle’ refers to the fact she was born on Christmas Day, and her second ‘Marion’ refers to her childhood nanny named Marion Sloane. She is the ninth and youngest child of Elisabeth (née Meynard), a French-born scholar of Huguenot descent, and Robert Maxwell (born Ján Ludvík Hyman Binyamin Hoch), a Czechoslovak-born Jewish British media proprietor. She was born two days before a car accident that left her 15-year-old brother Michael in a prolonged coma until his death in 1968. Elisabeth later reflected that the accident had an effect on the entire family, and surmised that Maxwell had shown signs of anorexia as a toddler; Maxwell said at age three, "Mummy, I exist." According to her lawyers, when she was 13, Maxwell tacked a poster of a pony, and Robert hit the hammer on her hand, which was bruised for weeks.

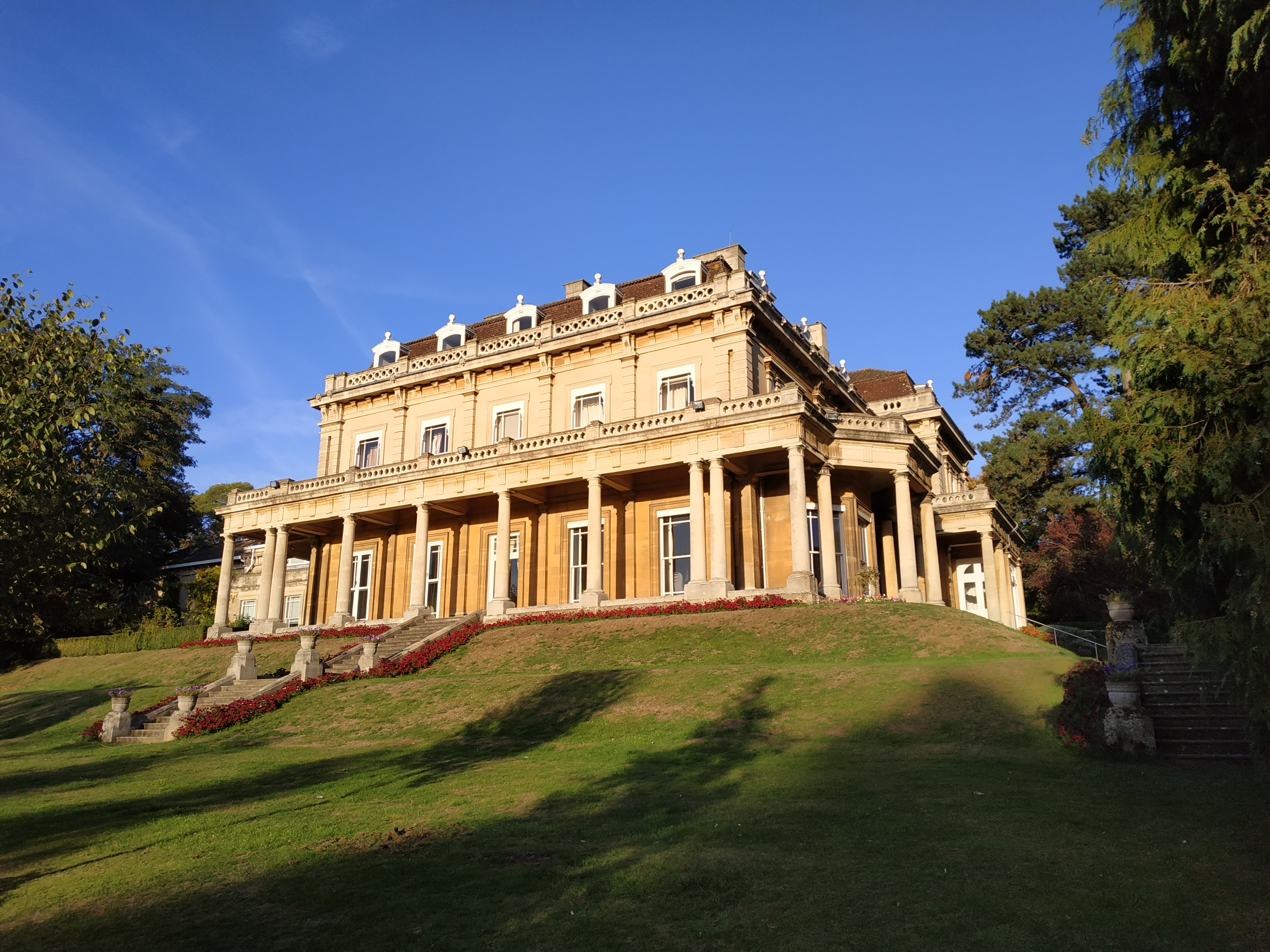
Headington Hill Hall, Oxford

Throughout childhood, Maxwell lived with her family at Headington Hill Hall, a 53-room mansion in Oxford, England, where the offices of Pergamon Press, a publishing company run by Robert, were also located. Elisabeth later said that all her children were raised as Anglicans. Maxwell first attended Oxford High School for Girls and then, at age nine, was enrolled at Edgarley Hall, followed by Headington School at age 13. She attended Marlborough College to study for A-Levels, before earning a degree in Modern History with Languages in 1985 from Balliol College of the University of Oxford. While at Balliol, she fraternised with future prime minister Boris Johnson and author Anna Pasternak.

Maxwell had a close relationship with Robert and was reportedly his favourite. The Times reported that he did not permit her to bring her boyfriends home, or to be seen with them publicly, after she started attending Oxford.

== Career ==
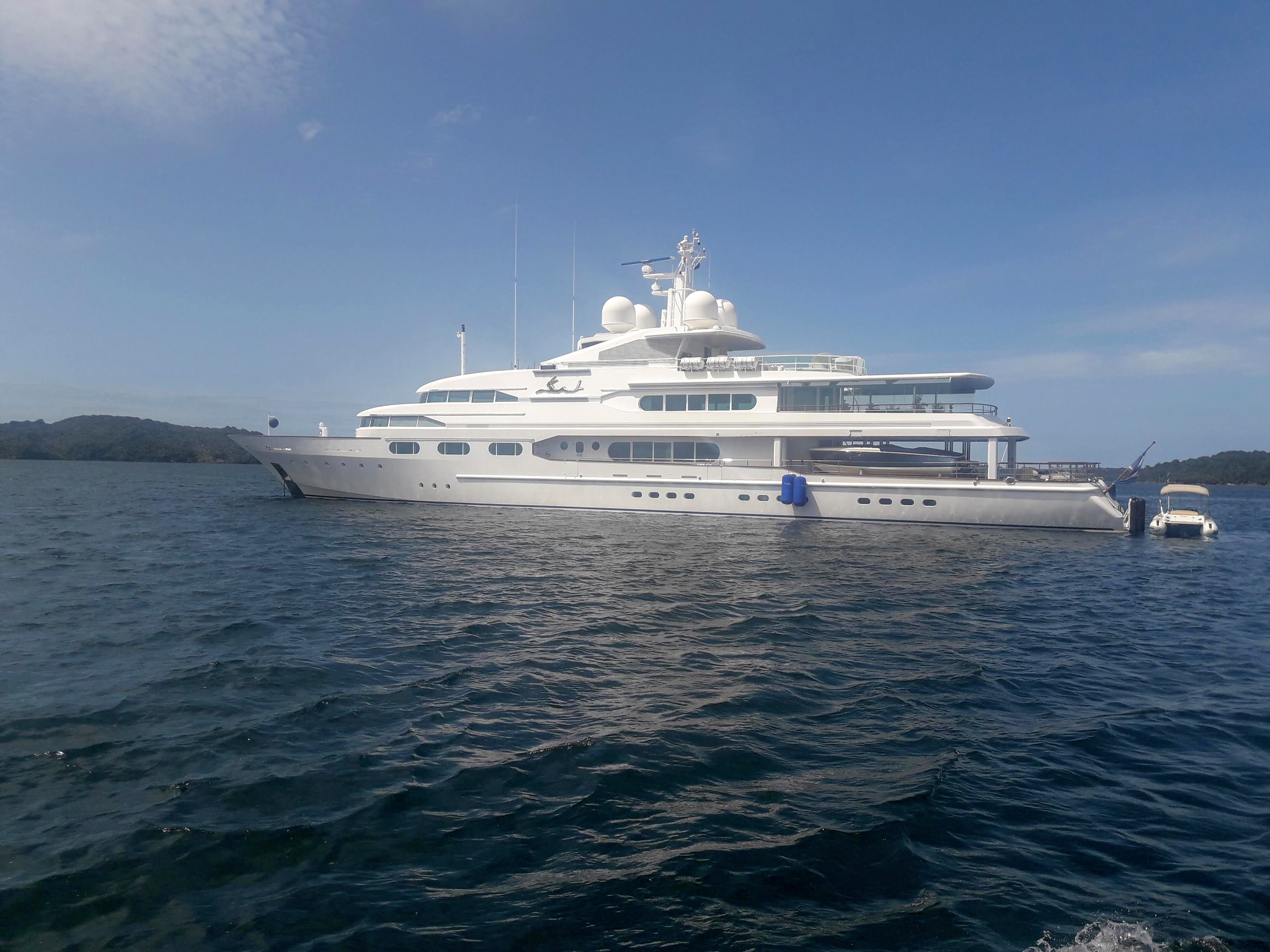
The Dancing Hare yacht, formerly known as the Lady Ghislaine

Maxwell was a prominent figure in the London social scene of the 1980s. She founded a women's club named after the original Kit-Cat Club and was a director of Oxford United Football Club during her father's ownership. She also worked at The European, a publication her father had established. According to Tom Bower, writing for The Sunday Times, in 1986 Robert invited her to the naming in her honour of his new yacht the Lady Ghislaine, at a shipyard in the Netherlands. She spent a large amount of time in the late 1980s aboard the yacht, which was equipped with a jacuzzi, sauna, gym, and disco. The Scotsman said Robert had also "tailor-made a New York company for her". The company, called Maxwell’s corporate gifts, was not profitable.

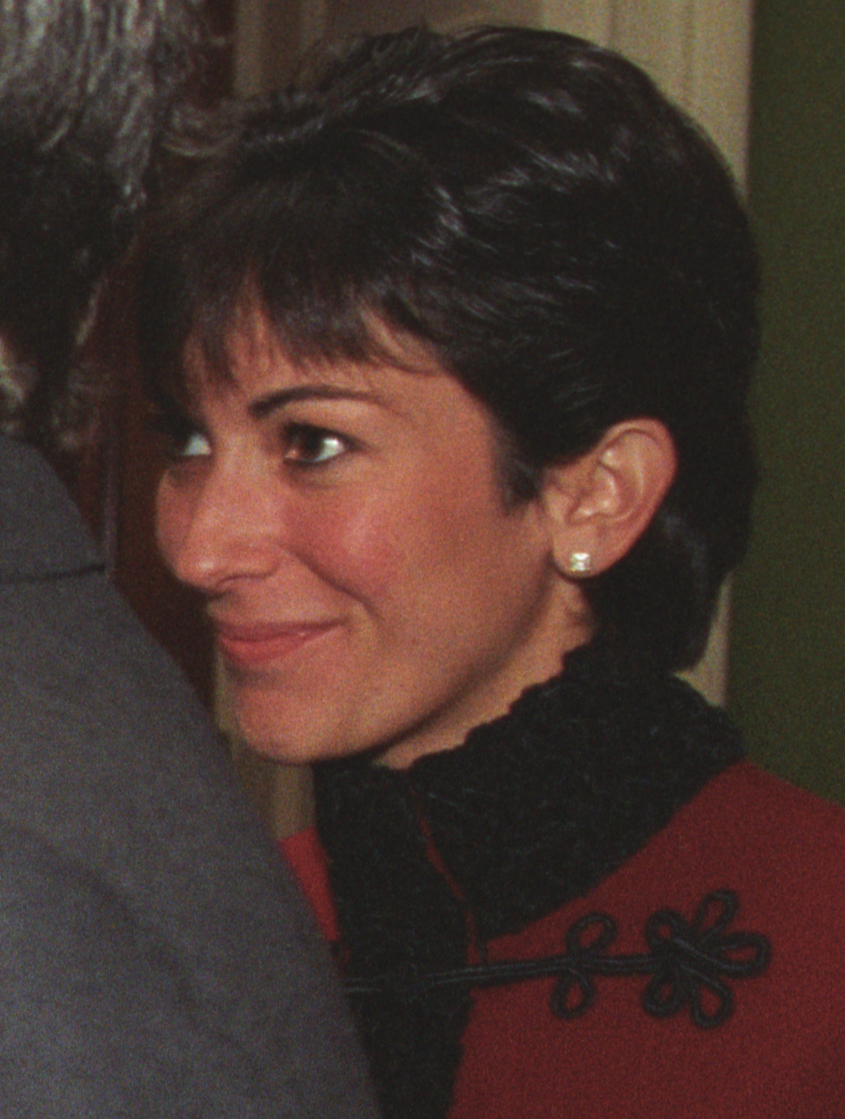
Maxwell in 1993, aged 31

The Sunday Times reported that Maxwell flew to New York City on 5 November 1990 to deliver an envelope on her father's behalf that, unbeknownst to her, was part of "a plot initiated by her father to steal $200m" from Berlitz shareholders. After Robert purchased the New York Daily News in January 1991, he sent Ghislaine to New York City to act as his emissary. This furnished her entry to the Manhattan social scene. In May 1991 Maxwell and her father took the Concorde on business to New York, from where he soon departed for Moscow and left her to represent his interests at an event honouring Simon Wiesenthal.

In November 1991 Robert's body was found floating in the sea near the Canary Islands and Lady Ghislaine. Soon afterwards, Ghislaine flew to Tenerife, where the yacht was berthed, to attend to his business paperwork. She attended her father's funeral in Jerusalem alongside Israeli intelligence figures, President Chaim Herzog and Prime Minister Yitzhak Shamir, who delivered the eulogy. Although a verdict of death by accidental drowning was recorded, Maxwell has since said she believes her father was murdered, commenting in 1997: "He did not commit suicide. That was just not consistent with his character. I think he was murdered."

After his death, Robert was found to have fraudulently appropriated the pension assets of Mirror Group Newspapers, a company that he ran and in which he held a large share of ownership, to support its share price. Pension funds over £400m were said to be missing, and 32,000 people were affected. Two of Maxwell's brothers, Ian and Kevin, who were the most involved with their father in daily business dealings, were arrested on 19 June 1992 and charged with fraud related to the Mirror Group pension scandal. The brothers were acquitted three and a half years later in January 1996.

Maxwell moved to the United States in 1991, shortly after her father's death. In November 1992, she reportedly purchased a one- way Concorde ticket to New York to escape the social stigma surrounding her father's pension fraud. Maxwell was provided with an annual income of £80,000 (equivalent to £183,997 in 2025) from a trust fund established in Liechtenstein by her father. By 1992 she had moved to an apartment of an Iranian friend overlooking Central Park. At the time, Maxwell worked at a real estate office on Madison Avenue and was reported to be socialising with celebrities. She quickly rose to wider prominence as a New York City socialite. In 1996, Maxwell made headlines when she was arrested in West London for drink-driving; the media reported her occupation as "internet operator".

== Relationship with Jeffrey Epstein ==
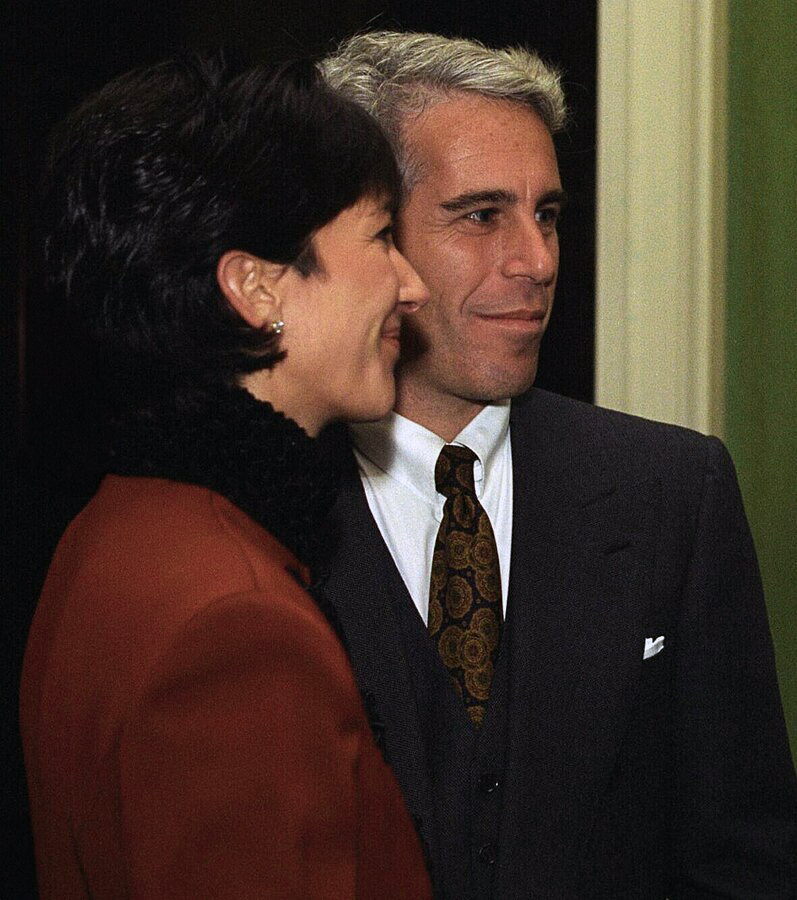
Maxwell with Jeffrey Epstein in a meeting with Bill Clinton, 29 September 1993

Accounts differ on when Maxwell first met the American financier Jeffrey Epstein. According to Epstein's former business partner Steven Hoffenberg, Robert Maxwell introduced his daughter to Epstein in the late 1980s. The Times reported that Maxwell met Epstein in the early 1990s at a New York party following "a difficult break-up with Count Gianfranco Cicogna" (1962–2012) of the CIGA Hotels clan. Maxwell and Epstein were associated with each other by February 1993. In 1995, Maxwell and Epstein were guests of honour on a cruise organised by Lindsay Fox who had invited Rodney Adler and wife Lindi as well as James Packer and then-girlfriend Deni Hines.

Maxwell had a romantic relationship with Epstein for several years in the early 1990s and remained closely associated with him for more than 25 years until his death in 2019. The nature of their relationship remains unclear, although at Maxwell's trial, prosecutors said that from 1994 to 1997 they were engaged in an intimate relationship.

A January 2001 article by Nigel Rosser of the Evening Standard reported that friends of Epstein said Maxwell "remains desperate to marry Epstein", further elaborating: "You could say she was pretty much entirely dependent on him. She loves him. He sometimes treats her well, sometimes off-handedly. You could say she sees something of a father in him."

In a 2009 deposition, several of Epstein's household employees testified that Epstein referred to her as his "main girlfriend" who also hired, fired, and supervised his staff, starting around 1992. She has also been referred to as the "Lady of the House" by Epstein's staff and as his "aggressive assistant". In 1995 Epstein renamed one of his companies the Ghislaine Corporation; based in Palm Beach, Florida, US, the company was dissolved in 1998.

In a 2003 Vanity Fair profile on Epstein, the author Vicky Ward said Epstein referred to Maxwell as "my best friend". Ward also observed that Maxwell seemed "to organize much of his life". As a qualified helicopter pilot, Maxwell also transported Epstein to Little Saint James, his private Caribbean island in the US Virgin Islands. In her October 2025 memoir Nobody's Girl, Virginia Giuffre alleged Maxwell and Epstein sought to use her to be a surrogate mother for a baby they were planning to have together.

Photograph of Prince Andrew, Virginia Giuffre and Ghislaine Maxwell in 2001

Politico reported that Maxwell and Epstein had friendships with several prominent individuals in elite circles of politics, academia, business, and law, including the US presidents Donald Trump and Bill Clinton, the lawyer Alan Dershowitz, and Andrew Mountbatten-Windsor, known at the time as His Royal Highness Prince Andrew. However, it has been acknowledged that Clinton, who Maxwell has stated was actually her friend and not Epstein's, was in fact connected to Epstein through her.

Maxwell is known for her longstanding friendship with the former Prince Andrew, and for having escorted him to a "hookers and pimps" social function in New York. In a November 2019 interview with the BBC, Andrew said that the two had known each other since Maxwell was an undergraduate at Oxford. She introduced Epstein to Andrew, and the three often socialised together.

There is a photograph of Prince Andrew, Virginia Giuffre, and Maxwell together. Giuffre claims the photo was taken on the first night she and Andrew met. However, Maxwell disputes the authenticity, stating in 2023 that “I don't remember her in my home. I know that Virginia travelled with Jeffrey, and so it’s entirely possible. But the photo doesn’t appear to be real, and I don’t recall it being taken.” Ian Maxwell also makes similar claims, saying that Ghislaine Maxwell was at her mother's birthday party at the time. Ian Maxwell also states that it doesn't matter if it's real, as it doesn't actually show Prince Andrew doing anything illegal.

In 2000, Maxwell and Epstein attended a party thrown by Andrew at the Queen's Sandringham House estate in Norfolk, reportedly for Maxwell's 39th birthday. In his November 2019 interview with the BBC, Andrew confirmed that Maxwell and Epstein had attended an event at his invitation, but he denied that it was anything more than a "straightforward shooting weekend". Epstein's pilot David Rodgers claimed that Maxwell entered a new romantic relationship around 2004, and was "separating from Epstein" around that time.

Maxwell introduced Epstein to the French modeling scout Jean-Luc Brunel who went on to form MC2 Model Management with funding by Epstein in the 2000s.

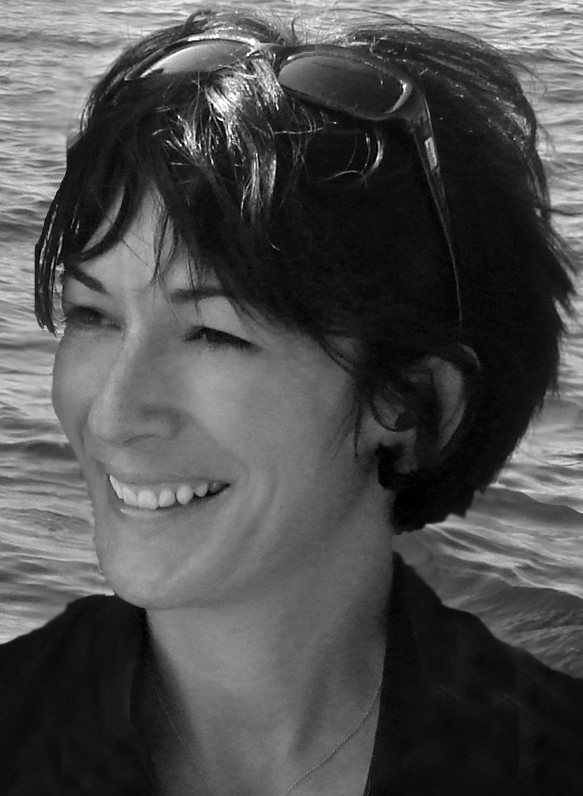
Maxwell in 2007

In 2008, Epstein was convicted of soliciting a minor for prostitution and served 13 months of an 18-month prison sentence. Following Epstein's release, although Maxwell continued to attend prominent social functions, she and Epstein were no longer seen together publicly. Although in 2013 Maxwell was an honoured guest at the Clinton Global Initiative conference, by late 2015 she had largely retreated from attending social functions.

In 2022, Maxwell told Daphne Barak that "If I could go back today, I would avoid meeting [Epstein], and I would say that that would be the greatest mistake I've ever made, and I would make different choices for where I would work".

== Civil cases and accusations ==
=== Civil suits ===
Maxwell was named in multiple civil lawsuits between 2009 and 2023.

==== Jane Doe 102 v. Epstein (2009) ====
In May 2009, Virginia Roberts Giuffre filed a lawsuit (with Katherine Ezell as her lawyer) as Jane Doe 102 against Epstein and accused Maxwell of recruiting her to a life of being sexually trafficked while she was a minor. The 2009 suit stated that "In addition to being continually exploited to satisfy defendant's [Epstein] every sexual whim, [Ms Giuffre] was also required to be sexually exploited by defendant's adult male peers, including "royalty, politicians, academicians, businessmen and or other professional and personal acquaintances." At the time, she named Epstein and Maxwell but did not identify any of the men. The suit was settled that same year for $500,000 and other unspecified "valuable consideration".

==== Virginia Giuffre v Maxwell (2015) ====
Details of another civil lawsuit, made public in January 2015, contained a deposition from "Jane Doe 3" that accused Maxwell of recruiting her in 1999, when she was a minor, and then grooming her to provide sexual services for Epstein:

In court documents, Epstein's accusers allege that Maxwell acted as a recruiter, an instructor, and in some cases a participant in the abuse he practiced. Virginia Giuffre claimed that Maxwell recruited her on behalf of Epstein when she was a 16-year-old spa attendant at Mar-a-Lago in Palm Beach, where Epstein had a home. Giuffre said much of her grooming came from Maxwell herself. "The training started immediately", she said in a video interview with the Miami Herald. "It was everything down to how to give a blowjob, how to be quiet, be subservient, give Jeffrey what he wants. A lot of this training came from Ghislaine herself. Being a woman, it kind of surprises you that a woman could let stuff like that happen. Not only let it happen but to groom you into doing it."

A 2018 exposé by Julie K. Brown in the Miami Herald revealed Jane Doe 3 to be Virginia Giuffre, who was previously known as Virginia Roberts. Giuffre met Maxwell at Trump's Mar-a-Lago Club in Palm Beach, Florida, when Giuffre was a 16-year-old spa attendant. She asserted that Maxwell had introduced her to Epstein, after which she was "groomed by the two [of them] for his pleasure, including lessons in Epstein's preferences during oral sex".

Maxwell repeatedly denied any involvement in Epstein's crimes. In a statement in 2015, Maxwell rejected allegations that she had acted as a procurer for Epstein and denied that she had "facilitated Prince Andrew's [alleged] acts of sexual abuse". Her spokesperson said "the allegations made against Ghislaine Maxwell are untrue" and she "strongly denies allegations of an unsavoury nature, which have appeared in the British press and elsewhere, and reserves her right to seek redress at the repetition of such old defamatory claims".

Giuffre asserted that Maxwell and Epstein had trafficked her and other underage girls, often at sex parties hosted by Epstein at his homes in New York, New Mexico, Palm Beach, and the United States Virgin Islands. Maxwell called her a liar. Giuffre sued Maxwell for defamation in federal court in the Southern District of New York in 2015. While details of the settlement have not been made public, in May 2017 the case was settled in Giuffre's favour, with Maxwell reportedly paying Giuffre "millions". Giuffre's family reported that she committed suicide on 25 April 2025, at her farm in Australia. She was 41, and had three children.

==== Sarah Ransome v Epstein and Maxwell (2017) ====
In 2017 Sarah Ransome filed a suit, in the US District Court for the Southern District of New York, against Epstein and Maxwell, alleging that Maxwell hired her to give massages to Epstein and later threatened to physically harm her or destroy her career prospects if she did not comply with their sexual demands at his mansion in New York and on Little Saint James. The suit was settled in 2018 under undisclosed terms.

==== Affidavit filed by Maria Farmer (2019) ====
On 16 April 2019, Maria Farmer went public and filed a sworn affidavit in federal court in New York, alleging that she and her 15-year-old sister, Annie, had been sexually assaulted by Epstein and Maxwell in separate locations in 1996. Farmer's affidavit was filed in support of a defamation suit by Virginia Giuffre against Alan Dershowitz. According to the affidavit, Farmer had met Maxwell and Epstein at a New York art gallery reception in 1995. The affidavit says that in the summer of 1996, they hired her to work on an art project in billionaire businessman Leslie Wexner's Ohio mansion, where she was then sexually assaulted by both Maxwell and Epstein.

Farmer reported the incident to the New York Police Department and the FBI. Her affidavit also stated that during the same summer, Epstein flew Annie to his New Mexico property where he and Maxwell molested her on a massage table. Farmer was interviewed for CBS This Morning in November 2019 where she detailed the 1996 assault and said that Maxwell had repeatedly threatened both her career and her life after the assault. In 2025, Farmer sued the federal government in the US District Court for the District of Columbia for failing to protect her and other victims.

==== Jennifer Araoz v Epstein's estate, Maxwell, and Jane Does 1–3 (2019) ====
On 14 August 2019 Jennifer Araoz filed a lawsuit in the New York County Supreme Court against Epstein's estate, Maxwell, and three unnamed members of his staff; the lawsuit was made possible under New York State's new Child Victims Act, which took effect on the same date. Araoz later amended her complaint on 8 October 2019 with the names of the previously unidentified women enablers to include Lesley Groff, Cimberly Espinosa, and the late Rosalyn Fontanilla.

==== Priscilla Doe v Epstein's estate (2019) ====
Maxwell was named in one of three lawsuits filed in New York on 20 August 2019 against the estate of Epstein. The woman filing the suit, identified as "Priscilla Doe", claimed that she was recruited in 2006 and trained by Maxwell with step-by-step instructions on how to provide sexual services for Epstein.

==== Annie Farmer v Maxwell and Epstein's Estate (2019) ====
Annie Farmer filed a lawsuit against Maxwell and Epstein's estate in Federal District Court in Manhattan in November 2019. She alleged that Epstein and Maxwell trafficked her from Arizona to Epstein's New Mexico ranch in 1996, where she claimed Maxwell sexually assaulted her. After Farmer accepted an offer from the Epstein Victims' Compensation Fund in October 2020, she attempted to drop her civil suit, but Maxwell's lawyers first requested the settlement amount. A judge ruled that Farmer was not obligated to disclose the settlement amount.

==== Jane Doe v Maxwell and Epstein's Estate (2020) ====
In January 2020 a lawsuit was filed against Maxwell and Epstein alleging that they recruited a 13-year-old music student, identified as "Jane Doe", at the Interlochen Center for the Arts in the summer of 1994 and subjected her to sexual abuse. The suit states that Jane Doe was repeatedly sexually assaulted by Epstein over a four-year period and that Maxwell played a key role both in her recruitment and by participating in the assaults. According to the lawsuit, Jane Doe was targeted by Epstein and Maxwell for being fatherless and from a struggling family, in much the same manner as many of the other alleged victims.

==== Maxwell v Epstein's Estate, Darren K. Indyke, Richard D. Kahn, and NES LLC (2020) ====
On 12 March 2020 Maxwell filed a lawsuit in the Supreme Court of the Virgin Islands seeking compensation from Epstein's estate for her legal costs. Maxwell claimed she had been a longtime employee of Epstein (from 1998 to 2006) who managed his property holdings in the US Virgin Islands, New York, New Mexico, Florida and Paris, and denied any knowledge of or involvement in his criminal activities. According to the lawsuit, Maxwell was seeking damages for the legal fees associated with defending herself against her accusers, expenses that she claims Epstein had promised to cover for her. In 2022, the law firm Quintairos, Prieto, Wood & Boyer dropped Maxwell as a client after alleging she refused to pay her legal fees.

==== Jane Doe v Epstein's estate (2021) ====
Maxwell was named in a civil suit filed against Epstein's estate in March 2021 by a Broward County woman who accused Epstein and Maxwell of trafficking her after repeatedly raping her in Florida in 2008.

==== Haddon, Morgan, and Foreman v. Ghislaine Maxwell (2022) ====
Maxwell was sued in 2022 by her attorneys legal firm Haddon, Morgan, and Foreman in County District Court in Denver, Colorado for more than $878,000 in unpaid legal fees. Her brother, Kevin Maxwell, and her then-husband, Scott Borgerson, were named as co-defendants. The lawfirm which began representing Maxwell in 2015, also alleged that Maxwell and Borgerson had attempted to shield her real estate assets in limited liability companies in an effort to protect them from creditors like the law firm.

==== Stein v. Maxwell and Epstein's Estate (2023) ====
In 2023, Elizabeth Stein filed a lawsuit in New York Supreme Court against Maxwell and Epstein's estate. Stein said she met Maxwell when interning at the luxury retailer Henri Bendel and while attending the Fashion Institute of Technology in 1994. At the time, she was 4-foot-11 and weighed about 80 pounds, making her appear younger than her 21 years. She described three years of grooming, sexual assault and trafficking. In 2021, Stein had been deemed ineligible for compensation from the Epstein victims fund. The lawsuit was settled in 2024, with Stein receiving compensation without admission of wrongdoing by Maxwell or the estate.

=== Dispute over release of court documents ===
On 2 July 2019 the US Court of Appeals for the Second Circuit ordered the unsealing of documents from the earlier civil suit against Maxwell by Giuffre. Epstein was arrested on 6 July 2019 at Teterboro Airport in New Jersey and charged with sex trafficking and sex trafficking conspiracy. Maxwell requested a re-hearing in a federal appeals court on 17 July 2019, in an effort to keep documents sealed that were part of a suit by Giuffre. On 9 August 2019 the first batch of documents was unsealed and released from the earlier defamation suit by Giuffre against Maxwell. Epstein was found dead on 10 August 2019, after reportedly hanging himself in his Manhattan prison cell.

Maxwell and her lawyers continued to argue against the further release of court documents in December 2019. Reuters confirmed on 27 December 2019 that Maxwell was under investigation by the FBI for facilitating Epstein's criminal activities. Additional documents from the Giuffre v Maxwell defamation suit were released on 30 July 2020. The documents included a deposition given by Giuffre and more recent email exchanges between Maxwell and Epstein, with some of the correspondence from 2015. On 3 January 2024 over 900 pages of previously sealed documents relating to Giuffre's civil case against Maxwell were made public following litigation by the Miami Herald; further documents were released on 4 January.

=== Attempts to locate Maxwell to serve court documents ===
On 27 December 2019 Reuters reported that Maxwell was among those under FBI investigation for facilitating Epstein. After his arrest, Maxwell was in hiding, communicating with the courts only through her lawyers who, as of 30 January 2020, had refused to accept on her behalf service of three lawsuits against her. The New York Times reported that by 2016, Maxwell was no longer being photographed at events. By 2017, her lawyers claimed before a judge that they did not know her address; they further stated that she was in London, but they did not believe she had a permanent residence.

Maxwell has a history of being unreachable during legal proceedings. During the lawsuit filed in 2017 from Ransome against Maxwell, US District Judge John G. Koeltl granted a motion for "alternative service" on the grounds that the plaintiff's efforts to reach Maxwell were persistently thwarted; these included hiring a private investigation firm that attempted service at three physical addresses, sending information to several email addresses, and reaching out to the lawyers actively representing Maxwell in another lawsuit who refused to become a "general agent of process" to relay the information to her.

According to court documents from a lawsuit filed by Epstein in the US against Bradley Edwards (a representative for several of his accusers), in 2010 Maxwell had agreed to provide a deposition in the case but reportedly left the country one day before Edwards was scheduled to fly to New York to take her deposition, "claiming she needed to return to the United Kingdom to be with her deathly ill mother" with no intention of returning to the United States. However, Maxwell returned within a month to attend Chelsea Clinton's wedding.

In January 2020 it was reported that Maxwell had refused to allow her lawyers to be served with several lawsuits in which she has been directly named in 2019 and 2020, including one by Farmer and from Araoz. While Maxwell's lawyers continued to argue on her behalf against the release of additional court documents from the Giuffre v Maxwell lawsuit, they claimed to not know where she was or to have permission to accept the lawsuits filed against her.

Authorities in the US Virgin Islands (USVI) were unsuccessful in locating Maxwell during the three and a half months they were seeking to serve her with a subpoena. USVI prosecutors consider Maxwell to be a "critical fact witness" in their lawsuit against Epstein's estate. A court filing from the USVI Department of Justice, released on 10 July 2020, stated that Maxwell was also under investigation for her alleged participation in Epstein's sex trafficking operation in the US Virgin Islands.

== Criminal trial, conviction and incarceration ==
=== Arrest and indictment ===
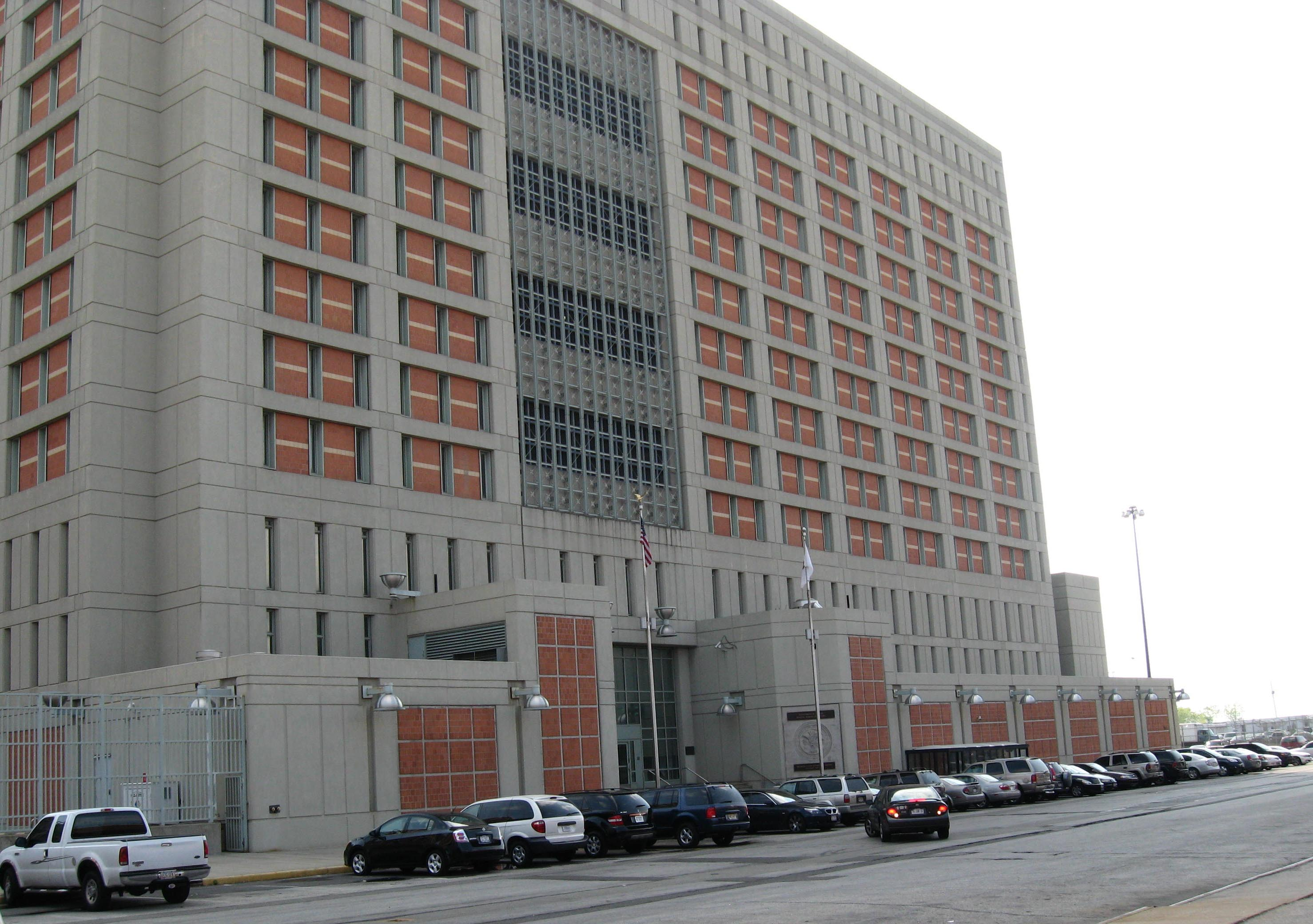
The Metropolitan Detention Center, Brooklyn, in New York City

Maxwell faced persistent allegations of procuring and sexually trafficking underage girls for Epstein and others, charges she denied. Maxwell was arrested in Bradford, New Hampshire, US, by the FBI on 2 July 2020, through the use of an IMSI-catcher ("stingray") mobile phone tracking device on a phone used by her to call her husband Scott Borgerson, her sister Isabel, and one of her lawyers.

Prosecutors, led by United States Attorney for the Southern District of New York Audrey Strauss, charged Maxwell with six federal crimes, including enticement of minors, sex trafficking of children, and perjury. The indictment charged that between 1994 and 1997, she "assisted, facilitated, and contributed" to the abuse of minor girls despite knowing that one of three unnamed victims was 14 years old. Donald Trump said in July 2020: "I just wish her well." In an interview two weeks later with Axios, he returned to the subject telling Jonathan Swan: "Yeah, I wish her well. I'd wish you well. I'd wish a lot of people well. Good luck. Let them prove somebody was guilty."

Maxwell was held at the Metropolitan Detention Center, Brooklyn, New York. Lawyers requested that Judge Alison Nathan release her on US$5-million bond with monitored home confinement while awaiting trial. On 14 July 2020 Maxwell pleaded not guilty to the charges. A naturalised US citizen since 2002 who also holds passports from France and the United Kingdom, Maxwell was denied bail as a flight risk amid concerns regarding her "completely opaque" finances, her skill at living in hiding, and the fact that France does not extradite its citizens. The judge set a trial date of 12 July 2021.

Maxwell's lawyer reiterated her request for bail on 18 December 2020, and proposed she reside with a friend in New York City while under 24-hour surveillance as she awaited trial. Her then-husband, Scott Borgerson, made a secured offer of US$22 million to guarantee her presence at future appearances. On 28 December 2020, her second request for bail was denied by the judge. Maxwell's bail request was opposed by her alleged victim Annie Farmer.

On 19 January 2021, a court hearing was disrupted by QAnon followers – who believe Maxwell was working in cohort with a cabal of child-sacrificing Satanist liberal elites who traffic children for sex – as the proceedings were illegally livestreamed to YouTube. On 26 January 2021, a motion by Maxwell's lawyers challenged her grand jury indictment, claiming that it did not reflect the ethnic diversity of the jurisdiction in which the violations of the law were alleged to have occurred.

On 29 March 2021, US prosecutors added new charges of sex trafficking a minor and sex trafficking conspiracy, alleging that Maxwell was involved in grooming a fourth girl, aged 14, to engage in sexual acts with Epstein between 2001 and 2004 at his residence in Palm Beach. Maxwell pleaded not guilty to the additional charges; she faced six counts that included sex trafficking of a minor and sex trafficking conspiracy, in addition to two counts of perjury.

Maxwell's lawyers regularly protested the conditions of her confinement and claimed that her sleep was disturbed by a light shone in her eyes every fifteen minutes to deter the chances of her committing suicide, and that she was denied a sleep mask. Defence lawyers denied that she was suicidal and accused the Bureau of Prisons of overcompensating for the death of Jeffrey Epstein. In a Twitter post, her family said that Maxwell had, as of November 2021, spent more than 500 days in solitary confinement in the period preceding her trial.

=== Sex-trafficking trial ===
In April 2021, US District Judge Alison Nathan ruled that Maxwell would face two separate trials, one for the sex trafficking charges and another for perjury. Nathan delayed the first trial to 29 November 2021, after Maxwell's defence lawyers argued that the additional charges added in March 2021 did not give them enough time to prepare. Maxwell appeared in court on 15 November 2021. The sex trafficking trial commenced on 29 November with opening statements. Twelve jurors, plus six alternates, had been picked from a pool of forty to sixty people.

Prosecutors Lara Pomerantz and Audrey Strauss chose to focus on four victims. The victims that testified were presented to the courtroom as Jane, Kate, Carolyn, and Annie Farmer. Jane testified that Maxwell and Epstein had preyed upon her as she attended the summer camp at the Interlochen Center for the Arts in 1994. According to prosecutors, Epstein and Maxwell set up a pyramid scheme in which they would reward with additional money vulnerable girls who brought to them another vulnerable girl. Of the four witnesses only one, Annie Farmer, chose to publicly identify herself. Juan Alessi, Epstein's concierge in Manhattan, provided some of the most damning testimony, claiming that Epstein had 3 massages a day, and that Epstein and Maxwell asked him to pick up young girls for massage. Prosecutors said Maxwell was hired by Epstein and used the income "to support her lifestyle".

Prosecutors presented the massage table that Epstein had used to receive massages of a sexual nature in his Florida home. Prosecutors argued that because the massage table was manufactured in California, and used in Florida, it constituted proof of an interstate nexus to sex trafficking of a minor. Prosecutor Allison Moe stated in her closing arguments: "when Carolyn... was abused on a massage table that was manufactured in California, that proves that there was at least a minimal effect on interstate commerce, which is all that's required" for a count of sex trafficking.

Maxwell chose not to testify, telling the judge "Your honour, the government has not proved its case beyond a reasonable doubt. So there is no need for me to testify." She was represented by Jeffrey Pagliuca. A spokesperson for Maxwell's family had previously said she was "too fragile" to testify. The psychology professor Elizabeth Loftus was called as an expert witness for the defence and provided testimony on false memory syndrome. Cimberly Espinosa, former executive assistant for Jeffery Epstein testified that she never saw Maxwell doing anything inappropriate, and that she looked up to Maxwell. On 28 December, as infections from COVID-19 rose in the city, judge Nathan extended the jury's sitting times, as she was concerned that juror infections would raise the possibility of a mistrial.

During the trial, Maxwell sketched the courtroom artist, Jane Rosenberg, back. Rosenberg describes that she and Maxwell became "sketching buddies" during the trial. She also asked Maxwell's lawyer what her sketch looked like, and the lawyer said that he could not tell her that.

==== Conviction and appeals ====
Damian Williams, United States Attorney for the Southern District of New York, gives a statement following the conviction of Ghislaine Maxwell.

On 29 December 2021, Maxwell was convicted by a jury in US federal court on five sex trafficking-related counts carrying a potential custodial sentence of up to 65 years' imprisonment: one of sex trafficking of a minor (maximum: 40 years), one of transporting a minor with the intent to engage in criminal sexual activity (10 years) and three of conspiracy to commit choate felonies (15 years total).

Maxwell was acquitted on the charge of enticing a minor to travel to engage in illegal sex acts. Maxwell's family said the appeal process had begun. The only witness to use her real name during her testimony, Annie Farmer, spoke out after the trial saying, "I hope that this verdict brings solace to all who need it ... Even those with great power and privilege will be held accountable when they sexually abuse and exploit the young." Maxwell gave a statement stating that "I empathised deeply with all the victims in this case". She also said that her relationship with Epstein was her biggest regret and described Epstein as manipulative.

Maxwell sought a retrial on the grounds that a juror did not disclose during jury selection that he had been sexually abused as a child. He had shared a narrative of that abuse with other jurors during the proceedings. On 1 April 2022, the judge found that the juror's failure to disclose his abuse as a child did not warrant a new trial and dismissed Maxwell's request to set aside the verdict.

On 28 June 2022, Maxwell was sentenced to 20 years in prison; prosecutors were seeking a sentence of at least 30 years. In her concluding verdict, the judge said: "The evidence at trial established that Ms Maxwell directly and repeatedly and over the course of many years participated in a horrific scheme to entice, transport and traffic underage girls, some as young as 14, for sexual abuse by and with Jeffrey Epstein. I will pause on those words for a moment, 'by and with Epstein.' It is important at the outset to emphasize that although Epstein was, of course, central to this criminal scheme, Ms Maxwell is not being punished in place of Epstein or as a proxy for Epstein. Like every other participant in a multi-defendant case, Ms Maxwell is being punished for the role that she played in the criminal conduct. As to that role, the trial evidence established that Ms. Maxwell was instrumental in the abuse of several underage girls and that she herself participated in some of the abuse."

Prior to sentencing, Maxwell complained of threats from prison staff, but gave no details about the nature of the threats. Maxwell was placed on suicide watch on 24 June, but told the psychiatric team that she was not suicidal. A related request by her lawyers for a sentencing delay was denied.

Maxwell appealed the conviction on 7 July. On 25 July 2022, Maxwell was transferred from Metropolitan Detention Center, Brooklyn, to a low-security federal prison for female inmates at Federal Correction Institution, Tallahassee. She is scheduled to be released on 17 July 2037. In August 2022, her former lawyers sued her, alleging that she failed to pay $878,000 in legal fees. On 17 September 2024, three judges at the US Court of Appeals for the Second Circuit upheld Maxwell's five convictions and sentence.

In April 2025, her lawyer David Oscar Markus asked the Supreme Court to hear an appeal, and on the business day after her prison interview with deputy attorney general Todd Blanche, he made a new filing in the case. The petition tested whether an agreement by one federal prosecutor (to wit, Acosta) binds his colleagues across the country. However, on 6 October, the Supreme Court declined to hear her appeal.

Maxwell's friends and family maintain a website called “Real Ghislaine”, which presents arguments for Maxwell's innocence and contains links to resources such as statements by the Maxwell family. They also maintain an X (formerly Twitter) account, where they frequently created posts requesting kindness.

In April 2026, Maxwell's lawyer David Markus stated that he would ask for a presidential pardon, but he did not think it would be the right time because of the heavy focus on the Epstein files. He said that there was a good chance Maxwell would get pardoned.

Later in April, prosecutors revealed that they received a thumb drive from Maxwell with a ship date of 16 April 2026 with an amended motion. They did not reveal any details, but claimed it was similar to the argument she used for her original motion.

On 29 July 2026, the Senate passed a resolution to recommend that Maxwell does not receive a pardon. The resolution is not binding.

=== Sequestered perjury counts ===
In December 2021, Maxwell faced a second criminal trial for perjury on two charges that she lied under oath during a civil suit in 2015 about Epstein's abuse of underage girls. Each count carried a maximum sentence of five years in prison. Prosecutors said the perjury charges would be dropped if she was sentenced on the sex trafficking charges on schedule. Once they had secured a conviction against Maxwell, prosecutors declined to move forward with a court-ordered trial on the perjury charges.

== Incarceration, prison transfer and subpoena ==
On 23 July 2025, chairman James Comer of the US House Committee on Oversight and Accountability subpoenaed Maxwell to testify under oath about her involvement with Epstein. Answering through her lawyer on 29 July, Maxwell demanded immunity from further prosecution. Comer declined to provide immunity or advance knowledge of questions. In November 2025, Comer said Maxwell's lawyer had informed him that she would refuse to respond to any question if forced to testify.

The journalist Michael Wolff said that interest in Maxwell's case surged after the 17 July 2025 publication in Rupert Murdoch's Wall Street Journal of a 50th birthday letter of congratulations to Epstein from Trump, who immediately filed a $10 billion lawsuit against the newspaper. Maxwell had compiled Jeffrey Epstein's birthday book in 2003.

US Deputy Attorney General Todd Blanche, who in 2024 had defended Trump and in 2025 was appointed by Trump in his inaugural cleansing of the US Department of Justice, interviewed Maxwell on 24 and 25 July 2025. During the interview, Maxwell said that Trump had not done anything of concern in her presence.

=== Prison transfer ===
On 1 August 2025, the US Federal Bureau of Prisons confirmed that Maxwell had been transferred from FCI Tallahassee to the minimum-security Federal Prison Camp, Bryan, in Bryan, Texas, which is among the facilities "with the lowest level of security in the federal system, with limited or no perimeter fencing, dormitory-style housing and a relatively low staff-to-inmate ratio", regarded as one of the best federal prisons to serve time in. The White House told reporters that she had received no "preferential treatment" and suggested that her move was routine. On 11 February 2026 Attorney General Pam Bondi testified to the US Congress that "I did not know she was being transferred" and insisted the transfer was "same level". On 2 March, Democrats asked Bureau of Prisons Director William Marshall to explain it.

On 5 August, Representative Raja Krishnamoorthi proposed House Resolution 119–635 to the US House Committee on the Judiciary; the resolution "affirms that Ghislaine Maxwell's conviction and sentencing were more than warranted by the facts, and any receipt of a pardon, commutation, or other form of clemency by Ghislaine Maxwell would deny survivors the justice they deserve; and formally opposes the granting of a pardon, commutation, or other form of clemency to Ghislaine Maxwell." Thereafter, Joseph Schnitt, the acting Deputy Chief of Special Operations for the Department of Justice, was caught on video claiming that Maxwell was transferred to a lesser-security prison as a way "to keep her mouth shut", i.e. to keep her from contradicting anything said by the administration. The DOJ and Schnitt himself responded on 4 September 2025 by stating that Schnitt had no connection to the Epstein case. On 22 August, the Department of Justice released transcripts and recordings of interviews with Maxwell.

In November 2025 Representative Jamie Raskin reported that a whistleblower had informed him that Maxwell was receiving special treatment during her incarceration at a minimum security prison, including having custom meals delivered to her, guests allowed to bring computers during visits, access to a service dog in training as a companion and having the warden send out documents and emails on her behalf. These alleged privileges sparked a probe into the Trump administration. After discharge from the same prison, former actress Jen Shah made similar claims in a People magazine interview, saying that Maxwell got bottled water and private exercise, among other things. Shah also claimed Maxwell did not show remorse for victims. In response, the Bureau of Prisons gave a statement to People magazine saying that allegations of special treatment are treated seriously and investigated. Congressman Robert Garcia mentioned on CNN that he contacted Jen Shah's representatives for comment on the potential special treatment

=== Habeas petition ===
In December 2025, Maxwell's lawyer informed a judge that the pending release of Epstein documents could prevent her from receiving a fair re-trial should one be granted. Having run out of options for appeals, Maxwell sought extraordinary relief through a habeas petition, which she filed without a lawyer. In the habeas petition, she mentioned four unindicted co-conspirators and alleged that the Justice Department had reached "secret settlements" with twenty-five men who had not been prosecuted. In a 17 December court filing, she claimed to have evidence that she had not received a fair trial. A federal judge rebuked Maxwell for including unredacted victim names in her filings, which were later sealed.

In an updated petition unsealed in June 2026, Maxwell stated that lawyers for the victims acted as “de-facto prosecutors”, and that prosecutors did not follow the evidence, citing that they did not interview Les Wexner. Judge Engelmayer, denied her request to access the Epstein Files, which meant she had to rely on media reports to construct her petitions, which she said is an “almost impossible task”. Judge Engelmeyer denied these appeals. Maxwell’s family released a statement stating that "The court's opinion, as published, is marked by a tone of sarcasm and disdain that, in our view, undermines the appearance of impartiality and invites scrutiny of the judge's conduct," and continues to say that they are encouraging Maxwell to seek a certificate of appealability.

=== Congressional testimony ===
In July 2025, Maxwell was subpoenaed to provide a deposition before the US House Committee on Oversight and Government Reform. Her deposition occurred on 9 February 2026, when Maxwell appeared virtually (from prison in Texas) in a closed-door meeting with the House Committee on Oversight and Government Reform. She declined to answer any of the committee's questions by invoking her right against self-incrimination under the Fifth Amendment to the US Constitution.

James Comer, chair of the House Oversight Committee said that the committee was split on the idea of giving Maxwell a pardon in exchange for testimony. On April 25, 2026, Forbes contacted 25 Republican members of the House Oversight Committee, only 8 said that they were against the pardon

In May, Todd Blanche said that he would not recommend a pardon for Ghislaine Maxwell.

== TerraMar Project ==
In 2012, Maxwell founded the TerraMar Project, a nonprofit organisation that advocated the protection of oceans. In her TEDx talk, she said the inspiration for the TerraMar project was when she was using a submarine, and at 1,500 ft deep, she thought she saw a mythical creature, but then found out it was actually a coat hanger. She gave a lecture for TerraMar at the University of Texas at Dallas and a TEDx talk at TEDx Charlottesville in 2014. Maxwell accompanied Stuart Beck, a 2013 TerraMar board member, to two United Nations meetings to discuss the project. The TerraMar Project announced its closure on 12 July 2019, less than a week after the charges of sex trafficking brought by New York federal prosecutors against Epstein became public. An associated, UK-based company, Terramar (UK), listed Maxwell as a director. An application for the United Kingdom organisation to be closed was made on 4 September 2019, with the first notice in The London Gazette made on 17 September 2019. The company Terramar (UK) was listed as officially dissolved on 3 December 2019.

== Personal life ==
From at least 1997, Maxwell maintained a residence in Belgravia, London. In 2000 she moved into a 7,000-square-foot (650 m^{2}) townhouse on East 65th Street in Manhattan, New York City, six blocks from Epstein's mansion. Maxwell's townhouse was purchased for US$4.95 million by an anonymous limited liability company, with an address that matches the office of J. Epstein & Co. Representing the buyer was Darren Indyke, Epstein's longtime lawyer. In April 2016 the property was sold for $15 million.

According to Maxwell, she stopped having physical relations with Epstein in 2001. She also said her relationship with Epstein in 2019 was almost nonexistent.

For a time during her London years, Maxwell dated Count Gianfranco Cicogna-Mozzoni. Starting in 2003 Maxwell was romantically linked for several years, until 2010 to Ted Waitt, founder of Gateway Computers. She attended the wedding of Chelsea Clinton in 2010 as Waitt's guest. Maxwell helped Waitt to obtain and renovate a luxury yacht, the Plan B, and used it for travel to France and Croatia before their relationship ended in late 2010 or early 2011.

On 15 August 2019, reports surfaced that Maxwell had been living since 2007 in Manchester-by-the-Sea, Massachusetts, in the home of Scott Gerald Borgerson, a Council on Foreign Relations fellow in residence. In October 2020, due to the publicity surrounding Maxwell, Borgerson stepped down as CEO of CargoMetrics, a hedge fund he had founded. Maxwell and Borgerson were described as having been in a romantic relationship for several years. Locals in the town of Manchester-by-the-Sea said Maxwell had kept a low profile, went by "G" instead of her full first name, and had been seen on several occasions walking a Vizsla dog along the beach.

Borgerson and Maxwell filed documents in Massachusetts Land Court about Borgerson's residence, known as Phippin House, during a civil dispute with neighbours regarding rescinded access rights to the larger Sharksmouth Estate in 2019. A neighbouring property manager attested that Maxwell and Borgerson were living together at the property in question. Others have said they had been seen repeatedly running together in the mornings.

Borgerson stated in August 2019 that Maxwell was not currently living at the home and that he did not know where she was. On 15 August 2019 the New York Post published photographs of Maxwell dining at a fast-food restaurant in Los Angeles, claiming that "The Post found the socialite hiding in plain sight in the least likely place imaginable—a fast-food joint in Los Angeles". The photos were later proven to have been taken at a meeting with Maxwell's friend and lawyer Leah Saffian, who also gave other pictures to the Daily Mail.

Maxwell moved to a remote 156-acre (63 ha) property in Bradford, New Hampshire, in late 2019, where she used former British military personnel as personal security until her arrest in July 2020. At the time of her arraignment, federal prosecutors stated that Maxwell was married; she did not disclose the identity of her spouse or their respective finances. In December 2020 it emerged that she had married Scott Borgerson in 2016. Her secret 2016 marriage ended in 2021 via a prison call, as noted in her trial proceedings.

Maxwell is of Jewish descent on her father's side. In 2023, she reportedly converted to Judaism in prison. She previously invoked her Jewish ancestry in 2020, when she was alleged to have taken refuge in Israel following Epstein's death.

In a 2025 interview with Todd Blanche, she stated that she had an unspecified medical condition, claiming due to the condition she "cannot have a lot of sex". She also stated that she "fancied" John F. Kennedy Jr., but her relationship with him never went beyond having a few dinners.

Carole Radziwill, reality TV star and author, was friends with Maxwell. In an email, released in the Epstein files, Maxwell described Radziwill as "most wonderful, the most beautiful, the smartest, the best, the brightest", and even took a photo for Radziwill's memoir.In response to the controversy Radziwill denied any contact with Epstein and said she was unaware of criminal activity.

== Conspiracy theories ==
Maxwell has been the subject of various conspiracy theories circulated online following her arrest and subsequent detention. In particular, some social media users have claimed that she was "replaced" by another person during her incarceration, citing alleged inconsistencies in photographs released by the media, especially regarding the shape of her nose and other facial features. Authorities have never given credence to these claims. Maxwell's lawyer, David Oscar Markus stated regarding the body double allegations that "Jail is crushing and remember she was in torturous conditions including sleep deprivation back in New York. There are a lot of conspiracy theories out there but this one might be in the hall of fame."

== See also ==
- Jean-Luc Brunel – French model scout and sex trafficker (1946–2022)
