= The TerraMar Project =

Environmental organization (2012–2019)

- The TerraMar Project; TerraMar (UK)
- The TerraMar Project logo
- Formation: September 2012; 13 years ago
- Dissolved: December 2019; 6 years ago
- Type: Environmental
- Legal status: Non-profit organization; charity
- Purpose: Protection of oceans
- Locations: New York City (2012–2015) Woburn, Massachusetts (2016–2019); Salisbury, UK (2013–2019)
- Region served: Global
- Founder: Ghislaine Maxwell
- Website: https://theterramarproject.org/ (defunct)

The TerraMar Project was a self-described environmental nonprofit organization. It was founded in 2012 in the United States by former socialite and later convicted child sex offender Ghislaine Maxwell. A sister organisation in the United Kingdom was incorporated in 2013. TerraMar (US) announced its closure on 12 July 2019, shortly after New York federal prosecutors arrested Maxwell's associate, the financier and sex offender Jeffrey Epstein. TerraMar (UK) was dissolved on 3 December 2019.

== History ==
=== The TerraMar Project, United States ===
The TerraMar Project was founded on 26 September 2012 at the Blue Ocean Film Festival and Conservation Conference in Monterey, California, and focused on the 64% of the ocean that lies outside any single country's jurisdiction. Their mission was to create a "global ocean community" based around the idea of shared ownership of the global commons, also known as the high seas or international waters. According to Ghislaine Maxwell, an inspiration for the TerraMar project came when she was aboard a submarine and thought she saw a mythical creature at 1,500 ft deep. She was disappointed when she found out it was actually a coat hanger.

In 2014, on behalf of the TerraMar Project, Maxwell gave a lecture at the University of Texas at Dallas and later that year, a TEDx talk, about the importance of ocean conservation. Maxwell also spoke at the United Nations as the founder of the TerraMar Project. She accompanied Stuart Beck, a 2013 TerraMar board member, to two United Nations meetings to discuss the project. Maxwell presented at the Arctic Circle Assembly in Reykjavík, Iceland in 2013.

Scott Borgerson, listed on TerraMar's board of directors for 2013, appeared with Maxwell at the Arctic Circle conference. In June 2014, Maxwell and Borgerson spoke at an event in Washington, DC, sponsored by the Council on Foreign Relations, titled "Governing the Ocean Commons: Growing Challenges, New Approaches". TerraMar's commitment to advancing the Sustainable Development Goals (SDG) was showcased by the Clinton Global Initiative.

Tax documents for the organization consistently list Maxwell as the organization's president. The TerraMar Project's address was in New York City for Form 990 tax filings from 2012 through 2015, and a Woburn, Massachusetts, address for 2016 and 2017. The New York Times reported that TerraMar gave out no money in grants between 2012 and 2017 and described it as having unusually high accounting and legal fees for an organization of its size.

Questions were also raised about what TerraMar entailed beyond the high-profile appearance by Maxwell at the United Nations and on the TED stage. In 2017, an executive at a maritime firm made multiple requests for project funding to TerraMar's development director Brian Yuratsis that were ultimately denied despite Yuratsis professing interest in having TerraMar sponsor the project. The maritime executive who made the requests stated that "My impression was that TerraMar as a whole was pretty hollow", and that "It seemed like Brian was the entire organization."

On the organization's IRS annual return, the organization reported that it owed $560,650 to Ghislaine Maxwell, it owed $1,341 of credit card debt, and it had $10,252 of cash, as of 31 December 2018. During 2018, the organization had spent $5,365 for professional fees, $9,380 for website development, $11,157 for advertising, and $270 of bank fees, but it spent nothing toward program services.

Epstein was charged with new sex trafficking crimes on 6 July 2019. He was a close associate of Maxwell. The TerraMar Project announced its closure six days later, on 12 July 2019, via Twitter and a statement on its website.

=== TerraMar (UK) ===
TerraMar (UK) was a separate private limited company in the United Kingdom. It was incorporated in August 2013 in England and Wales, with the directors being Maxwell, Lucy Clive and Catherine Vaughan-Edwards. The company was run by Maxwell with a similar mission to the TerraMar Project.

TerraMar (UK) was registered as a charity in October 2013. Its mission was "the conservation, protection, and improvement of the environment" and, in particular, "the oceans, seas, coastlines and tidal areas", including "the conservation and protection of endangered marine flora and fauna, and the education of the public in the fields of marine conservation, marine ecology and related areas".

TerraMar (UK) was reported by The Times to have joined the "secretive messenger app service Telegram" on 10 August 2019, the day Epstein died in prison. The application for the UK organization to be dissolved was made on 4 September 2019, with the first notice in The London Gazette on 17 September 2019. The company was listed as active, with a Salisbury address, until it was listed as dissolved on 3 December 2019. The charity was removed from the register in the same month.

=== Founder convicted ===
TerraMar's founder, Ghislaine Maxwell, was arrested in July 2020 and charged with six counts related to the sexual abuse and trafficking of minors and lying to investigators. On 29 December 2021, Maxwell was convicted on five of six charges.

== Organization ==
The board of directors of the TerraMar Project (US) included former executive director of the United Nations Office for Partnerships (UNOP) Amir Dossal—who had handled $1 billion in the form of a grant from Ted Turner for charities—media executive Steven Haft, and Ariadne Calvo-Platero, daughter of the peer Lord Beaumont of Whitley, Maxwell's best friend from Oxford.
