= Terramar, Carlsbad, California =

Coordinates: 33.131°N 117.336°W

Terramar is located in Carlsbad, California. It is a small oceanfront neighborhood community developed by William Cannon in the 1950s. It has its own Association called the Terramar Association, with a set of rules. The Terramar Association has a quarterly newsletter called the Terramar Tides. Terramar has a number of breaks, but is primarily known as a longboard break.

It has private (gated) access to the beach (not all homes in this neighborhood are oceanfront). The beach access consists of a "Deck" that is elevated above the ocean and has benches, tables, BBQ, surfboard rack, and outdoor shower.
