= Dancing Hare =

Superyacht built by Amels in 1986

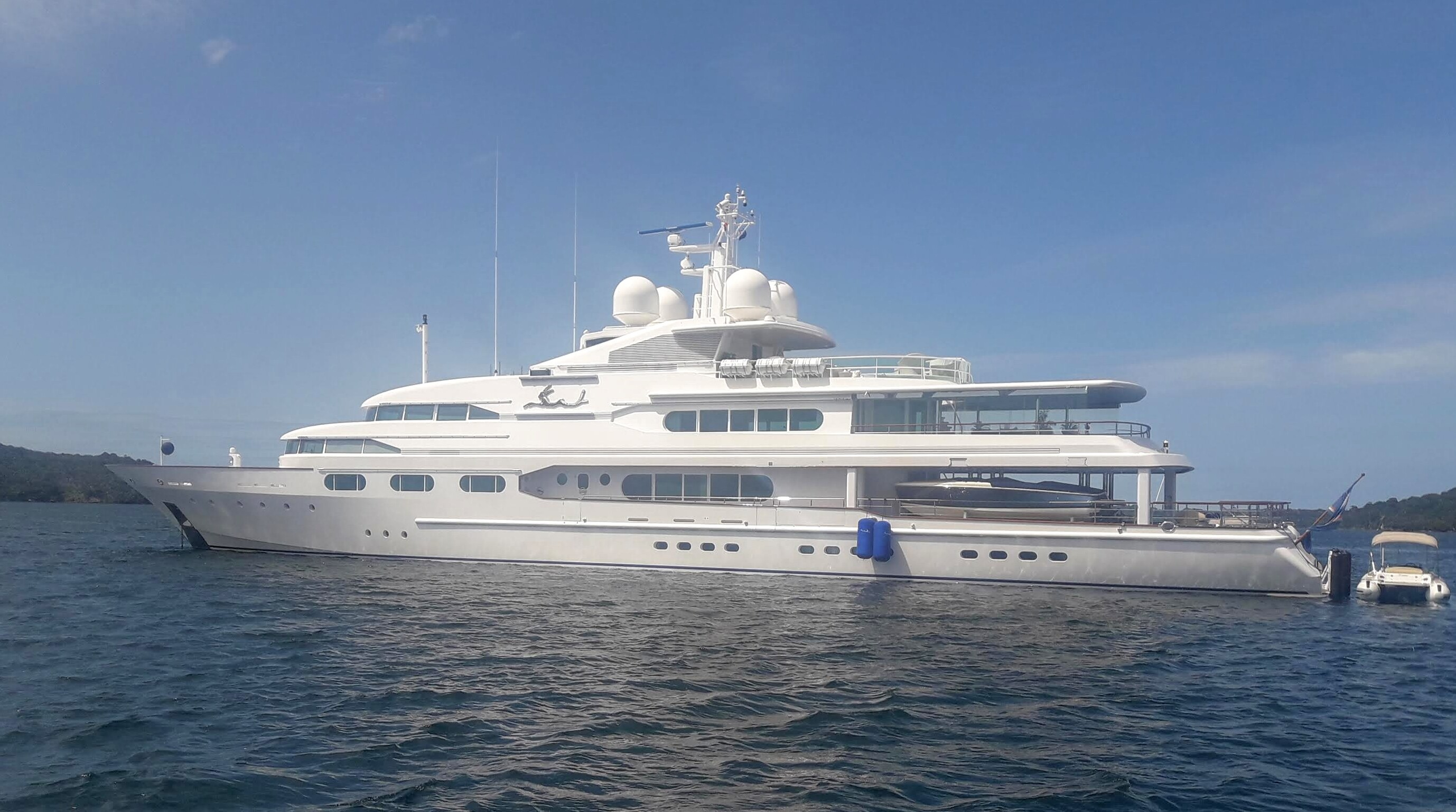

History

Marshall Islands
- Name: Dancing Hare (2018–present); Lady Mona K (1993–2018); Lady Ghislaine (1987–1993)
- Port of registry: Cayman Islands
- Builder: Jon Bannenberg/Amels
- Launched: 1986
- Identification: IMO number: 1002378; MMSI number: 538071262; Call sign: ZHBG9
- Status: Operational

General characteristics
- Type: Motor Yacht
- Length: 55 metres (180 ft)
- Beam: 9.2 metres (30 ft)
- Draft: 3 metres (9.8 ft)
- Installed power: 2,102 kilowatts (2,819 hp)
- Propulsion: Twin Caterpillar 3516 DI-TA
- Speed: 16.3 knots (30.2 km/h; 18.8 mph) (trial)
- Range: 3,800 nautical miles (7,000 km; 4,400 mi)

Dancing Hare (formerly Lady Ghislaine and Lady Mona K) is a superyacht built by Amels in 1986.

Built for Emad Khashoggi, she was then purchased, also in 1986, by Robert Maxwell, who died by drowning in 1991 while cruising on the yacht off the Canary Islands. She was then owned by an Arabian businessman who sold her in 2017. The new owner, Anna Murdoch, had her refitted and renamed Dancing Hare.

== Design ==
Built in 1986 for Emad Khashoggi by Amels of Makkum, Netherlands, it was the first in a series of Jon Bannenberg-designed super yachts. The yacht exterior includes a flared bow, lozenge-shaped ports, vertical windows and mullions and a sculpted mast complex.

== Robert Maxwell ==
Khashoggi, also developer of the Château Louis XIV and the Palais Rose, abandoned the project for the yacht and in 1986 sold the vessel to Robert Maxwell who named it Lady Ghislaine after his daughter Ghislaine. In 1991, it was the base for Maxwell in New York City, moored on the East River as he negotiated with the unions over his purchase of the New York Daily News.

=== Maxwell's death ===
On 5 November 1991, at the age of 68, Maxwell was on board Lady Ghislaine, which was cruising off the Canary Islands. Maxwell's body was subsequently found floating in the Atlantic Ocean. He was later buried in Jerusalem. The official verdict was accidental drowning, though some commentators have surmised that he may have died of suicide or been murdered. Ghislaine Maxwell, namesake of the boat and daughter of Robert Maxwell states that "I think he was murdered."

== Subsequent owners ==
After Maxwell's death the yacht was purchased by an Arabian businessman, who sold her in 2017 to Anna Murdoch, at one time the wife of Rupert Murdoch, one of Robert Maxwell's archenemies in the UK press world. It was only after the sale the new owner discovered the yacht had previously been owned by Maxwell. After a refit at the Balk Shipyard in Urk, Netherlands, over the winter, the vessel was renamed Dancing Hare in May 2018.

== See also ==
- List of motor yachts by length
