= The European (newspaper) =

British newspaper

- Front page of the first issue
- Type: Weekly newspaper
- Format: Broadsheet
- Owner(s): Robert Maxwell (1990–91); Barclay Brothers (1992–98)
- Launched: 11 May 1990
- Ceased publication: 14 December 1998
- Political alignment: Pro-Europeanism; Pan-European identity
- Language: English
- City: London
- Country: United Kingdom
- OCLC number: 25062933

The European, billed as "Europe's first national newspaper", was a British weekly newspaper founded by Robert Maxwell. It was published from 11 May 1990 until December 1998.

== History ==
Maxwell founded the paper in the fervour which immediately followed the destruction of the Berlin Wall and collapse of the Iron Curtain. The name was a reflection of the feelings of pan-European unity which were brought on by the historic changes, an ideal which Maxwell wholeheartedly supported. According to Time magazine, Maxwell originally envisaged a daily with a circulation of 650,000, but by the launch date plans had been cut down to a more realistic weekly with a circulation of 225,000. In the event, the circulation peaked at 180,000, over half of which was British.

According to British academic James Dennison, 'Its first issue featured contributions from Margaret Thatcher, Wilfried Martens, Jacques Santer, Mário Soares and the President of the Bundesbank as well as polls showing majority support for a single currency (in the United Kingdom and others, but not Germany or Denmark), soft anti-Americanism, new pan-European Ecu-denominated financial indices and coverage of the disintegration of the eastern bloc.'

Following Maxwell's death, the Barclay brothers bought the newspaper in 1992, investing an estimated $110 million and in 1996 transforming it into a high-end tabloid format oriented at the business community edited by Andrew Neil.

In 1996, The European had a staff of 70 in London, 3 in Brussels, 1 in Paris, 1 in Berlin, 1 in Moscow, as well as a network of 100 freelance writers throughout Europe.

Among the newspaper's innovations was a weekly short fiction contribution from published and previously unpublished writers.

The New European (a pro-EU newspaper founded in 2016 following the Brexit referendum) is partially inspired by The European's experience.

== Editors ==
- 1990: Ian Watson
- 1991: John Bryant
- 1992: Charles Garside
- 1993: Herbert Pearson
- 1994: Charles Garside
- 1996: Andrew Neil
- 1998: Gerry Malone

== Contributors (partial list) ==
- Nigel Cox
- Jean Cavé
- Bronwyn Cosgrave
- Jean Schalit
- Roger Faligot
- Peter Millar
- Jane Mulvagh
- Stephanie Theobald
- Peter Ustinov
- Mark Porter
- Walter Ellis
- Anne-Elisabeth Moutet
- Tim Walker, later to work on The New European
- Teodor Troev, later a Financial Times contributor
- Yaroslav Trofimov

== See also ==
- The New European
