= Connections of Jeffrey Epstein =

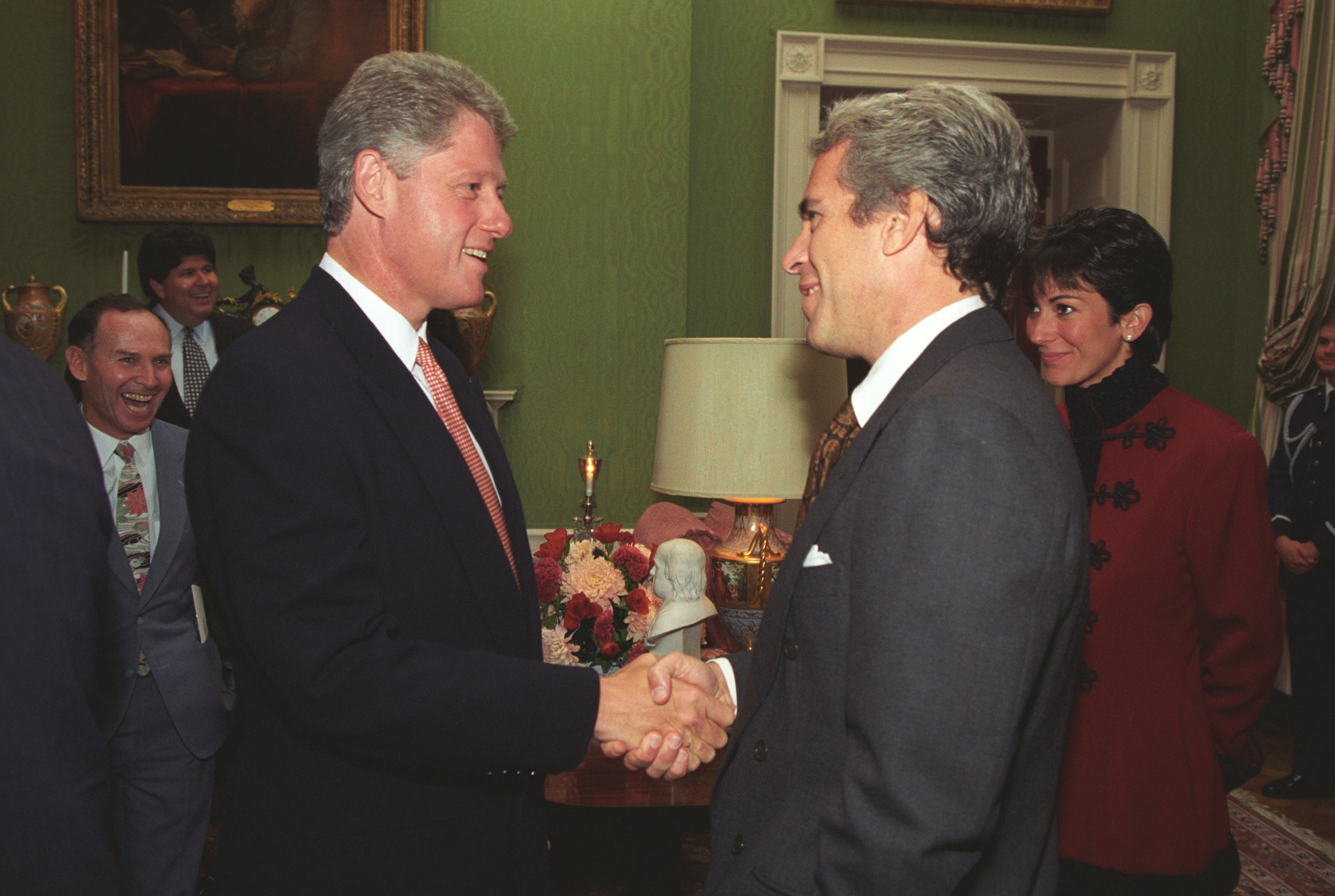
Epstein shaking hands with President Bill Clinton, one of his alleged associates, at the White House, September 1993 (with Ghislaine Maxwell in the background on the right)

The convicted child sex offender Jeffrey Epstein cultivated connections with influential individuals and institutions across the globe. Epstein was personally connected with many figures in international business, academia, politics, royalty, entertainment, and other areas. He was involved with many institutions as a member, donor, or both. Many of these connections continued to associate with Epstein even after his crimes came to light.

Epstein had a decades-long association with socialite Ghislaine Maxwell, who recruited young girls for him, leading to her 2021 conviction for sex trafficking and child sexual abuse. Epstein was business partners or friends with politicians such as Ehud Barak, Bill Clinton, Robert F. Kennedy Jr., and Donald Trump, businessmen such as Leon Black, Richard Branson, Sergey Brin, Bill Gates, Elon Musk, and Peter Thiel, media figures like Steve Bannon and Noam Chomsky, and royals like former Prince Andrew, Duke of York and Mette-Marit, Crown Princess of Norway, along with many others.

While many of Epstein's connections were known prior to the partial release of the Epstein files in 2025 and 2026, the files thus far published uncovered a vast network of previously unknown connections and revealed others were far deeper than previously realized.

== Background ==
In 2008, Epstein reached a plea deal with prosecutors after the parents of a 14-year-old girl told Florida police that Epstein had molested their daughter at his Palm Beach home. As a result of the plea deal, Epstein was convicted of soliciting prostitution from a minor, became a registered sex offender, and served 13 months in a minimum-security county jail, during which he was allowed to leave the facility up to 12 hours a day.

The plea deal granted immunity from all federal criminal charges to not only Epstein, but also the four named co-conspirators and any unnamed "potential co-conspirators". According to the Miami Herald, the non-prosecution agreement "essentially shut down an ongoing FBI probe into whether there were more victims and other powerful people who took part in Epstein's sex crimes." At the time, this halted the investigation and sealed the indictment. The plea deal was subsequently described as a "sweetheart deal". Alexander Acosta, the U.S. attorney for the Southern District of Florida who had negotiated the plea deal, later allegedly said he offered a lenient deal because he was told that Epstein "belonged to intelligence", was "above his pay grade" and to "leave it alone". In an October 2025 article in Skeptic, Mark Hoffer wrote that the frequently cited claim that Acosta had been told that Epstein "belonged to intelligence" originated with an anonymous source in a 2019 Daily Beast report and was subsequently denied under oath by Acosta. Hoffer writes that this quote later serves as a foundational myth of Epstein conspiracy theory, that build a connection between him and intelligence agencies, and cites controversial author Whitney Webb's works as representative of this narrative.

Ten years later in 2018, the Miami Herald published interviews with Epstein's victims. In 2019, Epstein was arrested by the FBI-NYPD Crimes Against Children Task Force. Epstein's Manhattan townhouse was searched by the FBI, which turned up evidence of Epstein's child sex trafficking.

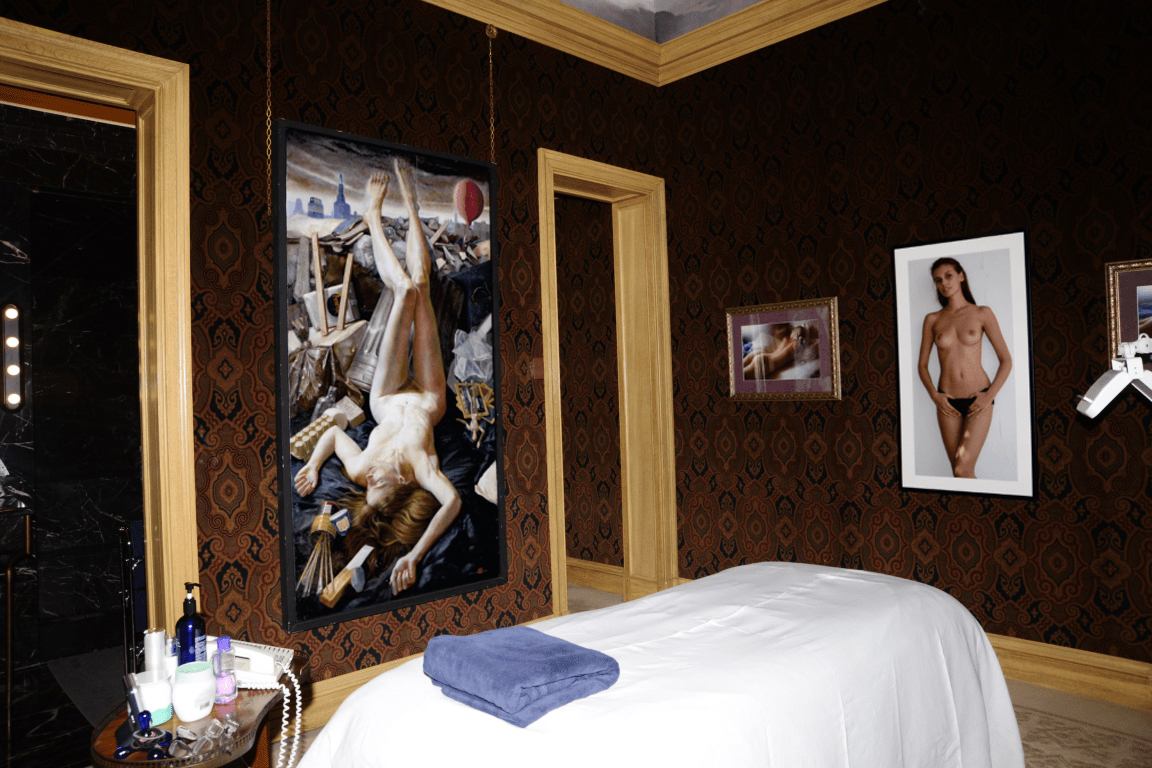
Massage room with a massage table in Epstein's NYC townhouse in 2019

On July 8, Epstein was charged with running a network of underage girls for sex to wealthy clientele. The grand jury indictment alleged that "dozens" of underage girls were brought into Epstein's mansions for sexual encounters.

On August 10, 2019, Epstein died in his jail cell while awaiting trial. Nineteen days later, the case against Epstein was closed.

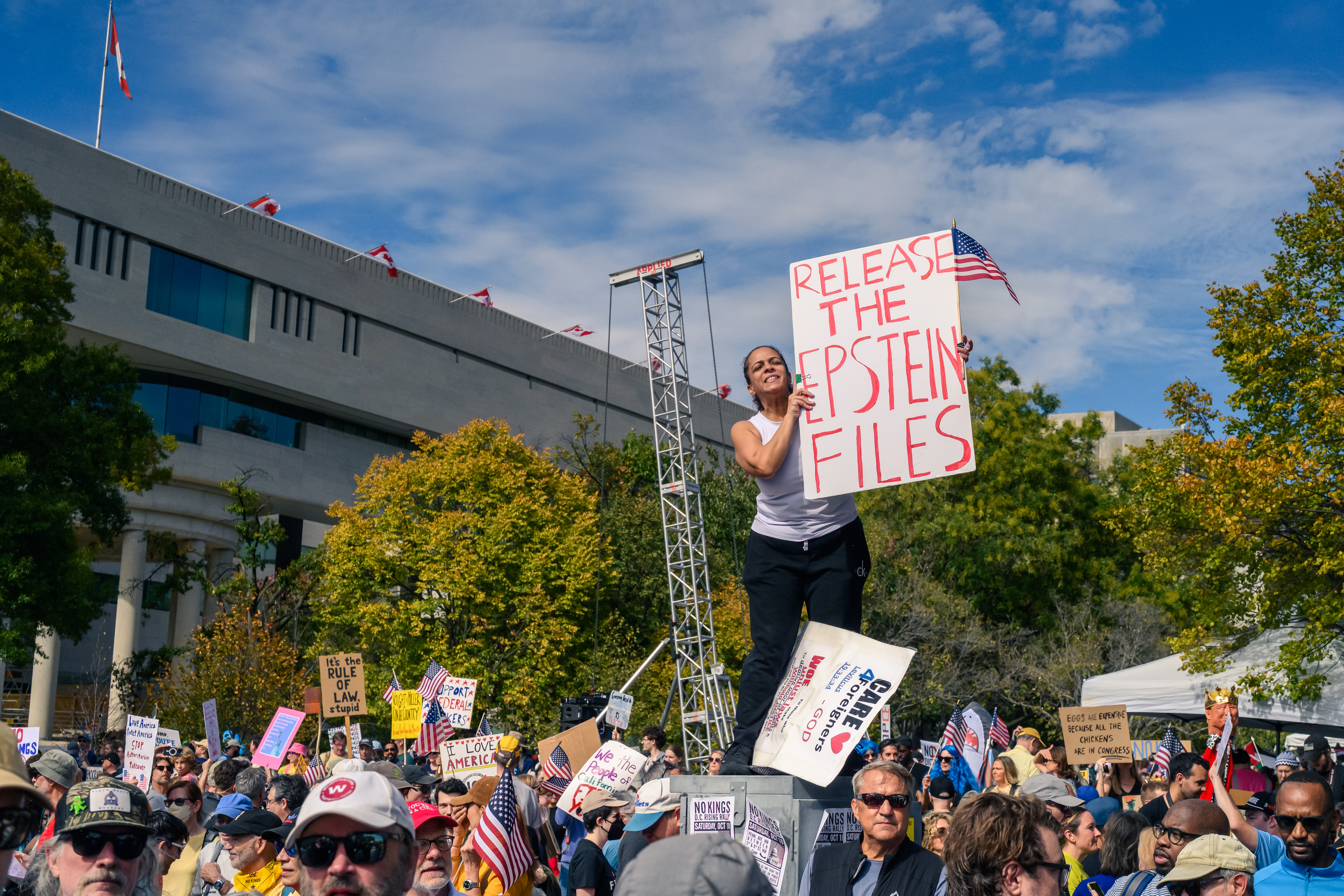
Protestors calling for the Epstein files to be released

From 2019 to 2026, there was public pressure to release the Epstein files, a collection of millions of documents accumulated during investigations into Epstein conducted as a result of his 2008 and 2019 indictments, and Donald Trump ran on releasing the Epstein files as a campaign promise of his 2024 presidential bid.

In November 2025, the U.S. House of Representatives passed the Epstein Files Transparency Act, the U.S. Senate unanimously approved it, and President Donald Trump signed the bill the next day.

In December 2025, the U.S. Department of Justice released a relatively small portion of the files. On January 30, 2026, an additional 3 million pages were released, including 2,000 videos and 180,000 images. While the Department of Justice acknowledged that a total of 6 million pages might qualify as files required to be released, it stated that the January 30 release would be the final one, and that it had met its legal obligations.

The released files mentioned a number of public figures, many of whom had previously unknown connections to Epstein. Others were shown to have deeper connections to Epstein than previously revealed.

== People ==
=== Inner circle ===
Al Jazeera reproduced a diagram from the US Justice Department mapping Epstein's inner circle, with the following persons: Jean-Luc Brunel, Lesley Groff, Darren Indyke, Richard Kahn, Ghislaine Maxwell, and Harry Beller. Names of other employees and aides were redacted.

The New York Times in 2019 reported that Sarah Kellen, Nadia Marcinkova, Lesley Groff, Adriana Ross, and Haley Robson were part of the Epstein system, and published that "Recruiters were allegedly told to target young, financially desperate women, and to promise them help furthering their education and careers." Rina Oh was another Epstein recruiter who spoke to the press in 2021. Kellen, Groff, Ross, and Marcinkova were listed as "unindicted co-conspirators" in the Acosta 2007 plea deal; when Judge Alison Nathan sentenced Maxwell in 2022, she described Kellen as "a knowing participant in the criminal conspiracy" and said she was "a criminally responsible participant".

==== Ghislaine Maxwell ====
British socialite Ghislaine Maxwell was one of Epstein's close affiliates, a partner in crime to his sex trafficking operations as well as a romantic partner. Maxwell and Epstein were associated with each other by as early as February 1993, and may have been introduced to one another by alleged Israeli spy Robert Maxwell, Ghislaine's father, in the late 1980s. Ghislaine had a romantic relationship with Epstein for several years in the early 1990s and remained closely associated with him for more than 25 years until his death in 2019. In 2021, she was found guilty of child sex trafficking and other offenses in connection with Epstein.

==== Jean-Luc Brunel ====
The French modeling agent Jean-Luc Brunel was introduced to Epstein by Ghislaine Maxwell, reportedly in the 1980s. The relationship between Brunel and Epstein strengthened in the 1990s. In the 2000s, Brunel founded MC2 Model Management with financial support from Epstein. Brunel was accused of acting as a recruiter for Epstein, luring young girls from disadvantaged backgrounds to the United States with the prospect of modeling jobs.

In 2020, Brunel was taken into custody in Paris and held for 14 months while awaiting trial on charges of rape of minors and sexual harassment. Eleven women had "accused Brunel of sexual assault in that case, which was closed after he died by suicide" in the La Santé Prison in Paris, in February 2022.

=== Personal connections ===
Epstein had close personal relationships with many politicians, investors, scientists, royals, and other famous persons. He was a longtime associate of Andrew Mountbatten-Windsor and Tom Barrack. He socialized with numerous public figures, including among others Crown Princess Mette-Marit of Norway, Harvey Weinstein, Steve Bannon, Reid Hoffman, Elon Musk, Donald Trump, and John Casablancas.

==== Woody Allen ====
Actor and filmmaker Woody Allen and his wife were regular guests at Epstein's Upper East Side townhouse from 2010 onward. In 2025, Allen stated that he was not remorseful about his friendship with Epstein and described him as charming and personable.

In 2010, Allen reportedly attended a dinner party at Epstein's home with George Stephanopoulos, Chelsea Handler, Katie Couric, Prince Andrew, Charlie Rose, and Eva Andersson-Dubin.

==== Eva Andersson-Dubin ====
Eva Andersson-Dubin dated Epstein from 1981 to 1990.

==== Richard Axel ====
Molecular biologist and Nobel laurette Richard Axel was friends with Epstein. The Guardian reports that he attended a birthday party in Paris for Epstein in 2010, two years after his conviction for sex offenses in 2008. Axel had earlier said of Epstein, "He has the ability to make connections that other minds can't make... He is extremely smart and probing." Axel maintained continued contact with Epstein until three months prior to his 2019 arrest.

==== Steve Bannon ====
Bannon was first in contact with Epstein in 2017 and remained in contact with until his 2019 arrest. He reportedly met with him at his home in New York, had dinners with him, and exchanged thousands of emails and texts.

Bannon also worked with Ehud Barak and Epstein attorney Reid Weingarten to attempt to fix Epstein's damaged public image. Bannon reportedly prepped Epstein for an interview with 60 Minutes that ultimately never occurred. Bannon did say that he did tape 15 hours of interviews with Epstein but denied that he was coaching him for further interviews and that the interviews were for an unreleased documentary on Epstein. In late 2025, the House Oversight Committee released emails and text messages between Bannon and Epstein. In 2019 they had discussed using a Kovel agreement, a legal maneuver, to extend attorney-client privilege to Bannon, allowing him to join Epstein's legal team, despite Bannon having no formal legal training. The proposed agreement would allow Bannon to withhold footage of his interviews with Epstein.

==== Ex-Prime Minister Ehud Barak ====
Ex-Israeli prime minister Ehud Barak maintained an extensive relationship with Epstein, beginning when they first met in 2003. Barak stayed at Epstein's apartments in New York several times over the years.

Leaked emails show that on one occasion when Barak planned to visit Little Saint James, Epstein's private island, in January 2014, Barak was "arranging that the security guys will not come with us to the island". In 2023, it was revealed that Barak had visited Epstein around 30 times from 2013 to 2017 and had also flown on the Lolita Express, Epstein's private jet. Barak denied any wrongdoing. In February 2026, Barak said that he had spent three hours at Epstein's home in the U.S. Virgin Islands together with his wife and security guards, and that the only other people he saw there were Epstein and maintenance staff.

In 2015, Barak invested in Carbyne (formerly Reporty), an Israeli tech startup that developed video streaming and geolocation software; a large portion of the funding invested by Barak was supplied by Epstein.

Leaked emails show that Epstein leveraged his relationship with Barak to approach powerful figures like Peter Thiel, a former director of Israeli signals intelligence, and two people in Vladimir Putin's circle: former Russian Deputy Minister of Economic Development Sergey Belyakov and Viktor Vekselberg. Epstein arranged for Barak to meet Thiel in New York on 9 June 2014. During the same time, Barak also tried to arrange to meet Putin's ally Viktor Vekselberg early in June 2014. An email sent in April 2015 shows that Barak asked Epstein for his opinion on Vekselberg-backed Fifth Dimension, a startup which later shut down after being sanctioned in 2018 by the US for alleged election meddling. This startup's leadership also included Benny Gantz (former Israel Defense Forces' chief-of-staff) and Ram Ben-Barak (former deputy Mossad director). According to The San Francisco Standard, leaked emails show that, around the same time Barak and Epstein contacted Thiel, other Israeli officials tried to build a relationship with Thiel as well, "jockeying for Thiel's attention", often aiming at a "lucrative" job at Palantir, Thiel's intelligence technology company.

For Epstein's 63rd birthday in 2016 a number of letters written for the occasion by high-profile individuals were compiled as a birthday gift; among these were a letter from Barak and his wife.

==== John Brockman ====
Jewish-American literary agent and author John Brockman was a long-term associate of Epstein's, both hosting and being hosted by Epstein at various events. Alongside then-Prince Andrew, Brockman once attended a dinner at Epstein's mansion to celebrate Epstein's release from prison for charges of child sex trafficking. Brockman was photographed aboard Epstein's private jet, the Lolita Express, in 2000, alongside Steven Pinker, Daniel Dennett, Katinka Matson (Brockman's wife and president of Brockman Inc.), and Richard Dawkins. Brockman's name was also found in Epstein's private jet log.

Brockman was described in The New Republic as Epstein's “intellectual enabler” for his role in connecting Epstein to eminent scientists. Brockman hosted an annual "Billionaires' Dinner" during the TED conference in Monterey, California, which Epstein attended from 2000 to as late as 2011, years after his conviction for child sex crimes. Brockman's dinners were, for a number of years after Epstein's conviction, almost entirely funded by Epstein as documented in his annual tax filings. This allowed Epstein to mingle with scientists, startup icons and tech billionaires. References to Epstein's attendance of these dinners on Brockman's website stating that they were one of Epstein's "favorite events", and that Epstein "enjoys hanging with stimulating and provocative thoughtful minds, who have achieved a high degree of success in finance, company, high tech, and scientific research" were later deleted.

==== John Casablancas ====
The Guardian alleged that John Casablancas, founder of Elite Model Management, was connected to Jeffrey Epstein, and, according to a 2019 lawsuit, he had sent a 15-year-old female model in 1990 to meet a photographer later identified as Epstein, who sexually assaulted her. The newspaper had earlier published an obituary stating, "Casablancas was frank about his personal preference for girls of only just legal age – 'child women'."

==== George Church ====
American geneticist George Church was an associate and grant recipient of Epstein. He received funding totaling $686,000 from the nonprofit Jeffrey Epstein VI Foundation from 2005 to 2007. In 2008, after Jeffrey Epstein's first conviction, Harvard University's then president Drew Gilpin Faust held that the university would no longer to accept gifts from him, yet Epstein continued to help Church raise funds after serving his prison sentence. Church said in 2019 that he regretted he did not know more about the donor.

==== President Bill Clinton ====
Epstein visited the White House multiple times during the Clinton presidency and attended Democratic fundraisers in the 1990s. After donating $1,000 to Bill Clinton's presidential election campaign in 1991, Epstein donated $10,000 to the White House Historical Association in 1993 and, accompanied by Maxwell, attended a donors' reception hosted by President Clinton and First Lady Hillary Clinton.

In 2002 and 2003, Clinton took multiple flights on Epstein's plane, commonly known by the nickname "Lolita Express", as part of foundation-related tours to promote global health and economic development. Flight log records later indicated Clinton's name on at least 17 legs of Epstein's flights in that timeframe. On one high-profile trip in 2002, Clinton flew aboard the Lolita Express to Africa along with actors Kevin Spacey and Chris Tucker to visit HIV/AIDS project sites. Epstein was an active supporter of the Clinton Foundation, even lending the Lolita Express to Clinton's international trips.

==== Sarah Ferguson ====
Sarah Ferguson, former duchess of York and ex-wife of Andrew Mountbatten-Windsor, exchanged emails with Jeffrey Epstein, revealing a close relationship between the two, including exchanges when Epstein was in prison for child sex offences. In one email exchange, Ferguson called Epstein the “brother” she “always wished for”. On the aftermath of these revelations, her charity was closed.

==== Bill Gates ====
In 2019, it was reported that Bill Gates's relationship with Epstein started in 2011, after Epstein was convicted for procuring a child for prostitution, and continued for years. Gates paid a visit to Epstein's house with his wife in the fall of 2013, despite her declared discomfort. Gates said of Epstein: "His lifestyle is very different and kind of intriguing although it would not work for me". Gates also met with Epstein several other times to discuss "the Gates Foundation and philanthropy". It has also been reported that Epstein and Gates met with Nobel Committee chair Thorbjørn Jagland at his residence in Strasbourg, France, in March 2013 to discuss the Nobel Prize. In 2023, it was reported that Epstein's relationship with Gates was said to have become strained over Epstein threatening to expose an alleged affair Gates had with a Russian bridge player.

In January 2026, unsealed documents revealed two email drafts by Epstein alleging Gates' extramarital affairs with "Russian girls" and "married women", resulting in him contracting a STD, and that an associate secretly obtained antibiotics for Melinda Gates while facilitating encounters. Gates denied the allegations.

==== Murray Gell-Mann ====
American theoretical physicist Murray Gell-Mann was an associate and grant recipient of Epstein. Gell-Mann acknowledged financial support from Jeffrey Epstein, who contributed via the Santa Fe Institute. In 2003, Gell-Mann also contributed a letter to The First Fifty Years, a collection of birthday greetings for Epstein. Years later, in 2011, Gell-Mann reportedly attended the "Mindshift Conference" on Little Saint James, Epstein's private island. The gathering was organized by Epstein and science promoter Al Seckel. Gell-Mann's name also appeared in Epstein's so-called "black book," a personal address book listing Epstein's close contacts. In 2025, Ghislaine Maxwell testified that Gell-Mann had originally been introduced to Epstein through her.

==== Juleanna Glover ====
Juleanna Glover is an American corporate public affairs consultant, entrepreneur, former Republican lobbyist, and political strategist. Glover is a part of the Never Trump movement.

==== Ben Goertzel ====
Computer scientist and vice-chairman of Humanity+ (formerly the World Transhumanist Association) Ben Goertzel was an associate and grant recipient of Epstein. He received a $100,000 grant from the Jeffrey Epstein Foundation for artificial general intelligence research in 2001. Epstein later gave Humanity+ $20,000 through his foundation in 2011. When interviewed by The New York Times about Epstein in 2019, Goertzel said, "I have no desire to talk about Epstein right now... The stuff I'm reading about him in the papers is pretty disturbing and goes way beyond what I thought his misdoings and kinks were. Yecch.".

==== Faith Kates ====
Founder of Next Management, a modeling agency in New York. Kates appears to have met Epstein regularly, including on one occasion with the then Prince Andrew at a New York department store in December 2010. Kates took business advice and discussed multi-million dollar loans with Epstein.

==== Stephen Kosslyn ====
American psychologist and neuroscientist Stephen Kosslyn was a friend and grant recipient of Epstein. Between 1998 and 2002, Harvard received $200,000 in donations from Epstein to support Kosslyn's research.

In February 2026, The Wall Street Journal reported on email correspondences between Epstein and Kosslyn, including after Epstein's 2008 conviction. The Journal reported that Kosslyn sent Epstein a birthday message in January 2008, writing, "May the coming year be infinitely better than the previous one," and that Epstein later wrote that "unfortunately jail starts Monday." Other emails showed Kosslyn working with Epstein on drafting scripts for reporters in an effort to improve Epstein's public image. Bloomberg News reported that in June 2008, around the time Epstein was beginning his jail sentence, Kosslyn replied to a message from Epstein with "DAMN! Let me know how/if I can help," in an email correspondence between the two.

==== Lawrence Krauss ====
Canadian-American theoretical physicist and cosmologist Lawrence Krauss was a close personal friend of Epstein. Krauss helped to arrange a 2006 conference on Little Saint James, Epstein's private island, that hosted 20 prominent physicists. Later, The Origins Project, at the time under the direction of Krauss, received $250,000 from an Epstein foundation called "Enhanced Education". Krauss defended Epstein after his 2008 guilty plea, stating that he did not believe the accusation since Epstein "always has women ages 19 to 23 around him".

Files released in 2026 revealed an ongoing relationship between Krauss and Epstein up to 2018. In 2011, Krauss wrote to Epstein, "Beyond anything else, you are my friend. I hope we can both always remember that, no matter what." In an email dated 2017, Krauss asked Epstein for advice in responding to allegations of sexual misconduct. Harvard Professor Steven Pinker said that Krauss was one of several colleagues who invited him to "salons and coffee klatsches" that included Epstein.

==== Baron Peter Mandelson ====
Peter Mandelson, a British former Labour Party MP, lobbyist, and diplomat, maintained both a friendship and business relationship with Epstein during and after his conviction. The released files evince that, while Business Secretary, Mandelson provided advice to Epstein on how JPMorgan Chase could lobby the UK government. According to the same files, Epstein handed large sums of money either to Mandelson or to his husband, Reinaldo Avila da Silva, while the former was a Labour MP. Released papers of the National Archives also show that Mandelson facilitated a meeting between Epstein and Prime Minister Tony Blair in 10 Downing Street.

Mandelson's support for Epstein, as well as alleged leaks from Mandelson to Epstein of high-level UK government documents resulted, first in his sacking as ambassador to the US, then in his resignation as member of the House of Lords, and finally in his arrest on the suspicion of misconduct in public office. Global Counsel, a lobbyist agency co-founded by Mandelson and Benjamin Wegg-Prosser, who also corresponded with Epstein and met him in at least one occasion, collapsed into administration after the subsequent revelations of Mandelson's relationship with Epstein.

The relationship between Mandelson and Epstein, and the appointing of the former as ambassador to the US resulted in a scandal for the Starmer administration as well as calls for Prime Minister Keir Starmer to resign.

==== Mette-Marit, Crown Princess of Norway ====
Epstein maintained a close association with Mette-Marit, Crown Princess of Norway (later Queen Mette-Marit) between 2011 and 2014. Mette-Marit and Epstein met several times, and she stayed in Epstein's Palm Beach mansion as late as 2013.

Documents revealed in 2026 showed that Mette-Marit was in correspondence with Epstein from 2012 to 2013. She repeatedly stated she was "dying of boredom" over royal duties, discussed adultery, the work of Vladimir Nabokov, and pictures of naked women she wanted to give to her then 15-year-old son Marius Borg Høiby as a wallpaper; they further discussed Epstein's "wife hunting" and dating of multiple young women, she suggested Epstein connect with Scandinavian women, asked him about "island life" and whether he enjoyed "sweetness", and they exchanged deeply intimate and personal messages about love and longing.

Several organizations have started processes to strip Mette-Marit of her patronages. Experts have stated that the scandals involving the royal family's conduct increasingly undermine its role as a representative of the Norwegian state abroad.

==== Mark Middleton ====
American businessman and lawyer Mark Middleton was a mutual friend of both Bill Clinton and Epstein. Visitor logs indicate Epstein paid 17 visits to the White House, often to meet with Middleton, one of Clinton's top fundraisers and assistant to the White House chief of staff, between 1993 - 1995. Middleton, a friend of Clinton's from Arkansas, was later identified as having facilitated Epstein's White House access in at least three instances. Middleton also flew with Epstein on the Lolita Express, his private jet, in May 1994. On May 7, 2022, Middleton was found dead at the Heifer Ranch in Perryville, Arkansas, approximately 30 miles from his home. Authorities reported that he was found hanging from a tree with an extension cord around his neck and a shotgun wound to his chest.

==== Marvin Minsky ====
American cognitive and computer scientist and artificial intelligence researcher Marvin Minsky was an associate and grant recipient of Epstein. Minsky received a $100,000 research grant from Jeffrey Epstein in 2002, four years before Epstein's first arrest for sex offenses; it was also the first donation from Epstein to MIT. Minsky organized two academic symposia on Little Saint James, Epstein's private island, one in 2002 and another in 2011, after Epstein was a registered sex offender. Virginia Giuffre said she was sent by Epstein to have sex with Minsky; Minsky's widow, Gloria Rudisch, has denied this.

==== Senator George J. Mitchell ====
American politician, diplomat, lawyer, and leading member of the Democratic Party from 1989 to 1995 George J. Mitchell was friends with Epstein. A 2003 handwritten letter in Epstein's "birthday book" showed the former U.S. Senate majority leader describing his friendship with Epstein as "a blessing." Documents released in January 2026 showed a continued relationship between Mitchell and Epstein following Epstein's 2008 conviction, including emails and scheduled appointments; a November 2013 email listed "10:30am Appt w/Senator George Mitchell".

On November 30, 2021, Epstein's former pilot Larry Visoski alleged Mitchell was one of the people he recalled flying on one of Epstein's private planes. Files released in 2026 contained references to an allegation by Virginia Giuffre, first made in a May 2016 deposition, that Ghislaine Maxwell had directed her to have sex with Mitchell. Mitchell denied ever having met or spoken with Giuffre, and stated that he became aware of Epstein's criminal prosecution only through the media.

Following the 2026 release of Epstein's documents that showed correspondence between Epstein and Mitchell following Epstein's conviction, Queen's University Belfast announced it would sever ties with Mitchell, removing his name from the Institute for Global Peace, Security, and Justice, and removing a commemorative bust from the campus. The US-Ireland Alliance decided to rename a scholarship that had been known as the "George J Mitchell Scholarship Program" based on allegations of abuse toward Virginia Giuffre. Mitchell also resigned as Honorary Chair of the Mitchell Institute, and the Institute announced that it would begin a process to consider changing its name.

==== Andrew Mountbatten-Windsor (Prince Andrew) ====
Revelations about former prince and Duke of York Andrew Mountbatten-Windsor's connections with Epstein led to the rescinding of his various royal titles, ranks, and duties.

==== Elon Musk ====
According to documents released by the U.S. Department of Justice (DOJ) in January 2026, Elon Musk had repeatedly asked Epstein to visit Little Saint James, Epstein's private island, from 2012 to 2013. There is no evidence that any meeting actually took place in that period. Several of the arranged meetings fell apart due to scheduling conflicts and other issues. Musk wrote to Epstein in a 2012 email that they had a "very enjoyable conversation", to which Epstein replied that he hoped it would become "the first of many". While Musk was chairman of SolarCity, Epstein spoke with him about using solar power at his own properties. Documents released by the DOJ in December 2025 show that Musk told Epstein that he wanted to "hit the party scene" in St. Barts, adding that "The invitation is much appreciated, but a peaceful island experience is the opposite of what I'm looking for." In an email, Epstein told Musk of a "new romance" his brother was having. He also gave Musk advice on sleeping habits. Musk was photographed alongside Epstein associate Ghislaine Maxwell at a Vanity Fair Oscars party in March 2014. He had also visited Epstein's apartment in Manhattan while doing research for his former wife Talulah Riley's book.

==== Martin Nowak ====
Austrian-born professor of mathematics and biology at Harvard University Martin Nowak was close friends with Epstein, who donated $30 million to fund his lab, the Harvard Program for Evolutionary Dynamics.

In response to the revelations of Epstein's support of Nowak and his lab in 2021, Nowak was suspended from supervising undergraduate research for two years, and the institute was permanently closed. Harvard's review, leading to the suspension, uncovered that Epstein had maintained access to a personal office in Nowak's lab for 9 years, even after his conviction for sex crimes, and used the office over 40 times, "typically accompanied by young women serving as his assistants".

==== Ariane de Rothschild ====
In February 2026, reporting based on documents released by the United States Department of Justice described continued contact between Epstein and Ariane de Rothschild from 2013 to 2019, including meetings and correspondence. The reports said Epstein provided intermediary and advisory services connected to the Edmond de Rothschild Group and that his firm was to receive US$25 million for consulting and related services connected to introductions and strategic advice.

==== Al Seckel ====
American-French skeptic Al Seckel is married to Ghislaine Maxwell's sister, Isabel Maxwell. He worked for Epstein as an event coordinator, a hacker, and a paid Wikipedia editor. In 2009, Seckel organized the "Mindshift" science conference for Epstein. The conference took place in early 2011 on Little Saint James, Epstein's private island. In attendance were scientists Murray Gell-Mann, Leonard Mlodinow, Gerald Sussman, and Frances Arnold, in addition to the actor and cryptocurrency proponent Brock Pierce. An interview between Epstein and Seckel discussing perception appeared on Epstein's science website on October 17, 2010.

Emails released by the US Congress in November 2025 show that Seckel charged Epstein tens of thousands of dollars for search engine optimization, including downranking stories about his conviction and removing "toxic suggested search engine terms".

Seckel accepted payments from Epstein to edit Epstein's Wikipedia page to remove his mugshot and mentions of his sex crimes from the lead section, to ban users who added unwanted material back in, and to add content about his philanthropic work. Epstein was dissatisfied with Seckel's hacking work, writing to Seckel in 2010, "Why don't you stop and look, the results are marginal... You have made every excuse you can make, it's tedious and tiresome... Al, you are talented. You should be careful." Seckel responded in an email, stating that in Epstein's case, his reputation had become "the 'worst' that anyone has ever come across," and that "To accomplish the amount that we did was a miracle of a semi-religious nature."

In July 2015, Seckel's body was reportedly found at the bottom of a cliff near his home in southern France. As of December 2021, his death remained unconfirmed by French authorities.

==== President Donald Trump ====
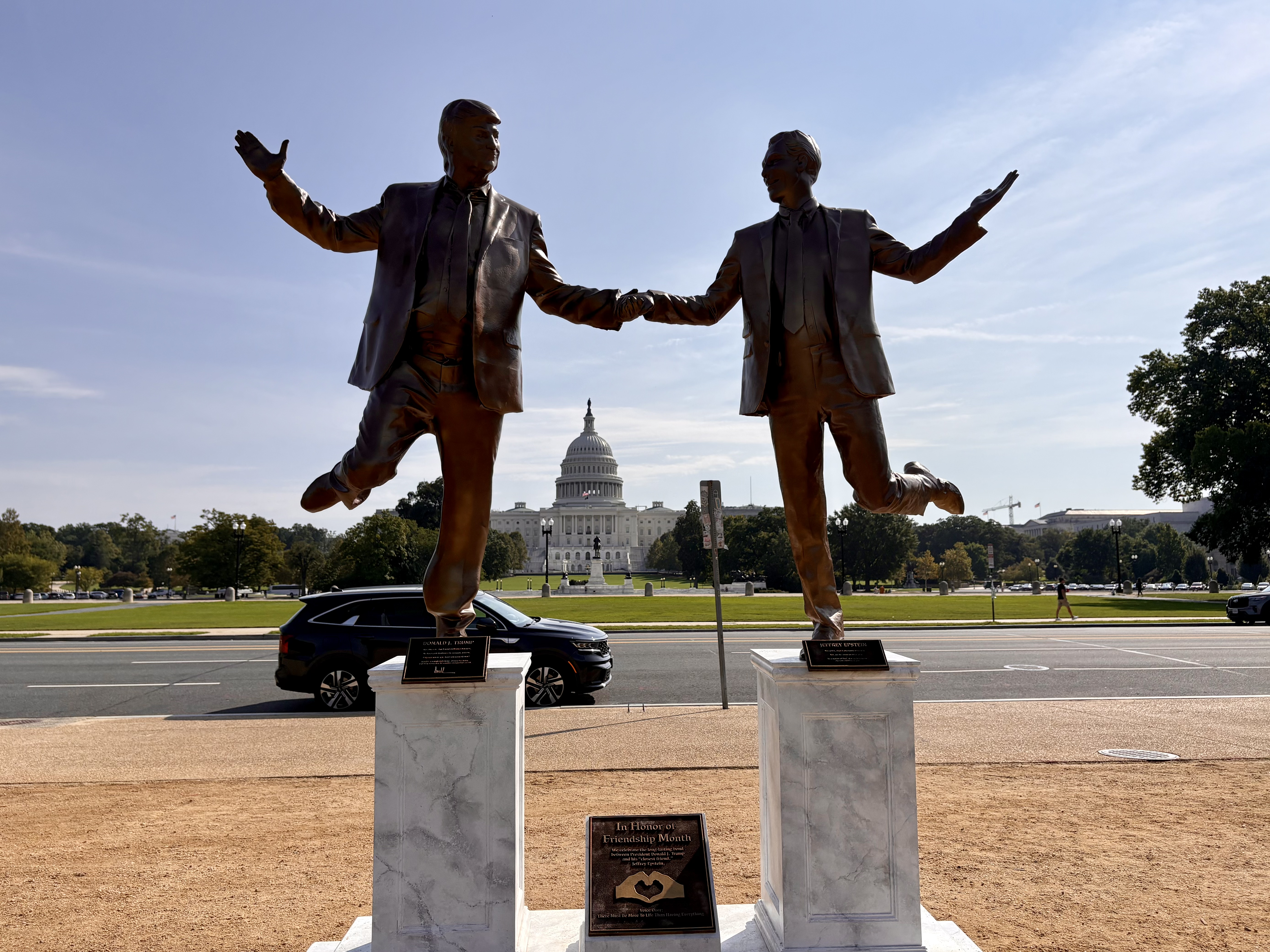
Best Friends Forever, a statue created by activists to protest Donald Trump and Jeffrey Epstein's relationship

Epstein and Donald Trump socialized from the late 1980s through the mid-2000s, particularly in New York City and Palm Beach. Trump publicly praised Epstein in 2002 but later stated that he had severed contact years earlier. A 1992 video surfaced showing Trump and Epstein at a party at Mar-a-Lago.

Virginia Giuffre, who would later go on to accuse Epstein and Ghislaine Maxwell of sex-trafficking her as a minor, worked as a locker room attendant in the spa at Mar-a-Lago as a teenager. There, she met Maxwell, who recruited her as Epstein's masseuse. Trump told reporters on July 28, 2025, that after Epstein "stole people that worked for me" that he "threw him [Epstein] out of the place." and that Epstein was thenceforth "Persona non grata". The next day, July 29, 2025, asked by reporters whether any of those workers were "young women" and whether Giuffre was included, Trump replied affirmatively that "he [Epstein] stole her [Giuffre]". Despite Trump's 2025 recollection that he expelled Epstein from the club "not too long" after Epstein hired Giuffre in 2000, Epstein remained a member of Mar-a-Lago until 2007.

==== Mortimer Zuckerman ====
Canadian-American billionaire media proprietor, magazine editor, and investor Mortimer Zuckerman contributed to a birthday book of letters for Jeffrey Epstein's 50th birthday, along with a host of other notable names. Zuckerman was identified as one of Jeffrey Epstein's clients, paying Epstein millions of dollars for estate planning and financial services between 2013 and 2015, years after Epstein's conviction for child sex crimes. An estate planning expert told Forbes that "The [industry] rules of ethics require fees to be reasonable" and that the unusually high sums paid to Epstein by Zuckerman were "insane".

== Institutions ==
Epstein was a member of various institutions, and funded or donated to a large number of organizations throughout his life. In 2014, he hired Tyler Shears to create jeffreyepstein.net and JeffreyEpstein.org, aggregators of news stories about his foundation and its financial support.

=== Business ===
==== The Rothschild Group ====
Epstein helped to manage the financial and legal affairs of the Rothschild Group (Rothschild & Co) and the Rothschild Bank (Edmond de Rothschild Group), as well as other Rothschild family holdings, from 2013 until his death in 2019; despite Epstein having been convicted in 2008. Epstein acted as a mediator for the family numerous times, both internally and with other entities which included the United States Department of Justice and Israeli Prime Minister Ehud Barak.

==== JP Morgan Chase Bank ====
The U.S. government sued JP Morgan Chase Bank in 2022, alleging that JP Morgan "facilitated, sustained, and concealed the human trafficking network operated by Jeffrey Epstein." A related class action alleged that the bank assisted in the structuring of Epstein's withdrawals of large amounts of cash.

==== Valar Ventures & Carbyne ====
In 2015 and 2016, Epstein invested $40 million into funds managed by Valar Ventures, a venture capital fund founded by Peter Thiel. In 2016, Epstein pitched an Israeli technology company Carbyne (formerly Reporty) to Valar Ventures; the proposal was rejected on account of being premature, but a Valar Ventures spokesperson said they would try to reengage when the startup was more developed. Earlier, in 2015, former Israeli Prime Minister Ehud Barak invested in Carbyne; a large portion of the funds invested by Barak were supplied by Epstein.

==== Deutsche Bank ====
Deutsche Bank maintained financial ties with Epstein, including up to 40 accounts, as detailed in released bank files. The documents highlight Epstein's banking activities through the German lender after his departure from JPMorgan, raising questions about due diligence, though no new criminal charges against the bank have resulted from the 2026 releases.

The German government has stated it is monitoring the files closely, with calls for further scrutiny of potential implications for German officials or security interests. No formal investigations specific to these German mentions have been confirmed as of March 2026.

=== Donations ===
==== Program for Evolutionary Dynamics ====
Epstein donated $30 million to Harvard University to fund the newly created Program for Evolutionary Dynamics which his friend Martin Nowak directed. Following Epstein's conviction, Harvard announced that it would not return any money. In response to revelations of Epstein's involvement with and support of the institute it was permanently closed in 2021.

==== Mount Sinai Hospital ====
According to a Politico review, Epstein gave at least $250,000 to Mount Sinai Hospital after his 2008 conviction.

==== Humanity+ ====
Epstein funded Humanity+ (formerly the Worldwide Transhumanist Association) through his foundation in 2011.

==== Various Jewish organizations ====
Epstein was known for his financial support for various Jewish organizations, including the Jewish National Fund, the National Council of Jewish Women, the Friends of Israel Defense Forces, the United Jewish Appeal⁣ Federation of New York, the Institute for Jewish Research (YIVO), the Congregation Kehilath Jeshurun synagogue, the Aspen Jewish Congregation synagogue, the Ramaz School, the Ziv Tzedakah Fund, Hillel: The Foundation for Jewish Campus Life, Harvard Hillel, the American Jewish Committee, the Columbus Jewish Foundation, the Yeshiva of Spring Valley high school, 92nd Street Y (formerly the Young Men's Hebrew Association), the Kolel Chibas Yerushalayim charitable organization, and the American Friends of the Hebrew University.

==== Palm Beach Police Department ====
Epstein donated money to the Palm Beach Police Department, which they returned following his conviction.

==== Educational and research institutions ====
Epstein financially supported a large number of educational and research institutions throughout his life. He funded the Institute for Advanced Study in Princeton as well as microbiology experiments in Bangladesh, particle physics in South Africa and M-theory in India. Schools Epstein funded include Columbia University, Cornell University, the Juilliard School of Music, New York University, Ohio State University, Penn State University, MIT, Pepperdine University, Hunter College, Georgia Southern University, the City College of New York, the Institute of International Education, UCLA, the New School University, Stanford University, The Dalton School, South University, the Ramaz School, the Interlochen Center for the Arts, and the New York University School of Medicine, among others.

=== Memberships ===
Epstein was a board member of Rockefeller University, a member of the New York Academy of Sciences, the Trilateral Commission, and the Council on Foreign Relations. He was a visiting fellow at Harvard University. Epstein was a trustee of the International Institute for Education, the parent organization of the Fulbright Program. Epstein was a founding member of the Scholar Rescue Fund.

Epstein was a board member at the New York Academy of Art from 1987 to 1994. He met Maria Farmer in 1995; Farmer alleged that Eileen Guggenheim introduced her to Epstein and Maxwell. A document released in 2026 showed that Epstein supported a scholarship around 2014, by choosing three students to whom he gave $10,000 in exchange of portrait commissions; it also stated that "Epstein frequently purchased artwork at the NYAA auctions and sponsored benefit tables" and that "Guggenheim estimated Epstein’s contributions to the NYAA at $5,000-$20,000 per year. Epstein had a patron relationship with Guggenheim's former babysitter".

From 2003 until 2007, Epstein was a founding member of CORE: Club (NYC), a high-priced social club in Manhattan, and provided financial and business advice to the owners as well as exchanging thousands of casual, friendly, and sometimes sex-tinged emails with them. Thereafter through at least 2018, he continued as a client of their spas.

Epstein both financially supported the Santa Fe Institute and donated money to other institutions through the Santa Fe Institute.

=== Political ===
==== Norway ====
Jeffrey Epstein maintained close relations with several members of the Norwegian political elite, ranging from royal such as Mette-Marit, Crown Princess of Norway to top diplomats and politicians such as Terje Rød-Larsen, Mona Juul, Børge Brende, and former prime-minister Thorbjoern Jagland.

==== United Kingdom ====
Jeffrey Epstein had various connections with the political and economic elite in the United Kingdom, ranging from close friendships to business relations. The British socialite Ghislaine Maxwell was one of his closest connections. However, Epstein also maintained close relations with former prince Andrew; Andrew's ex-wife, Sarah Ferguson; and former politician, lobbyist, and diplomat Peter Mandelson.

The released documents also exposed various other connections with the British elite. Epstein met with and received public relations advice from Sir Richard Branson, co-founder of Virgin Group, asked Lord Ken Macdonald—while he was Director of Public Prosecutions—to give legal advice to Farouk Abdulhak, for which he was paid £20,000 in travel expenses, regarding his suspected role in the murder and rape of Martine Vik Magnussen. Farouk Abdulhak was the son of Yemeni billionaire and Epstein's friend, Shaher Abdulhak. It was further revealed that Epstein met with the then Prime-Minister Tony Blair, at the behest of Peter Mandelson.

== Events ==
In 2004, Epstein and John Brockman hosted a dinner in Cambridge, Massachusetts with several Harvard and MIT faculty, including Alan Dershowitz, Steven Pinker, Robert Trivers, Larry Summers, E.O. Wilson, Marvin Minsky, Lisa Randall, Martin Nowak, and Alan Guth. In 2006, on Saint Thomas, Epstein hosted a private week-long conference for 20 world-renowned physicists including Lawrence Krauss, Gerard 't Hooft, David Gross, Frank Wilczek, Stephen Hawking, Kip Thorne, Lisa Randall, Maria Spiropulu, Barry Barish, and Alan Guth, as well as author Betsy Devine. The conference included a dinner on Little Saint James, Epstein's private island. In 2011, Epstein held a similar event on his private island, the "Mindshift Conference", hosting scientists Murray Gell-Mann, Leonard Mlodinow, Gerald Sussman, and Frances Arnold, in addition to actor and cryptocurrency proponent Brock Pierce.

Before his 2008 conviction, Epstein hosted frequent gatherings at his residences. Journalist Michael Wolff met Epstein around 2001 and advised him on press relations, recommending minimal engagement with reporters. Despite this advice, Epstein participated in high-profile media profiles published by New York Magazine in 2002 and Vanity Fair in 2003. Wolff later stated that Epstein viewed TED conferences as venues for meeting scientists, intellectuals, and technology leaders outside traditional social hierarchies.

After Epstein's incarceration, several associates publicly distanced themselves; however, entertainment publicist Peggy Siegal continued to include Epstein in private events, citing his assurances that he had changed his behavior. Epstein continued to fund intellectual salons organized by literary agent John Brockman, allowing him to interact with academics, scientists, and technology executives including Richard Dawkins, Lawrence Krauss, Steven Pinker, and many others years after his conviction.

== Documents ==
=== "Black books" ===
A contact book made public during the Epstein Files Phase 1 release in 2025, with the majority of its content redacted

In 2015, two printed phone books belonging to Epstein, commonly referred to as the "black books", listed more than 1,700 contacts. The book includes the names of media executives Rupert Murdoch and Michael Bloomberg, entrepreneurs Richard Branson and David Koch, actors and musicians Alec Baldwin, and Michael Bolton, and author Malcolm Gladwell. Royal family members such as crown prince Mohammed bin Salman and then-prince Andrew Mountbatten-Windsor were listed. Politicians listed include Donald Trump, Andrew Cuomo, John Kerry, Bill Clinton, Ehud Barak, and Tony Blair.

=== Mobile phones ===
Wired investigators bought location data from Near Intelligence that covered multiple residences on Epstein's private island. 200 mobile devices were tracked from July 2016 to July 6, 2019, when Epstein was arrested. The data cache also linked visitors to an estimated 166 locations in the United States, as well as cities in Ukraine, the Cayman Islands and Australia. Due to the specificity of the device coordinate data, the investigators were able to pinpoint the most frequent visitors coming from gated communities in Michigan and Florida; homes in Martha’s Vineyard and Nantucket; a nightclub in Miami and the sidewalk across the street from Trump Tower in New York City. Some of the coordinates point to multi-million mansions, while others point to lower-income areas where Epstein's victims attended school and lived.

=== The Epstein files ===
The Epstein files are a collection of millions of documents accumulated during investigations into Epstein conducted as a result of his 2008 and 2019 indictments. They include his contacts book, flight logs of his planes, court documents, images, videos, and emails.

After the Miami Herald published interviews with Epstein's victims in 2018, and Epstein was charged with federal sex trafficking crimes in New York in 2019, there was considerable public interest in the Epstein files, and their reveal was anticipated to occur during the course of Epstein's court case. However, Epstein died in jail in 2019 while awaiting his trial. With Epstein dead, the case was closed and the documents were not released.

The released files mentioned a number of public figures, many of whom had previously unknown connections to Epstein. Others were shown to have deeper connections to Epstein than previously revealed.

== See also ==
- List of people named in the Epstein files
- Litigation involving Jeffrey Epstein
- Whitney Webb
- Study Group (Jewish group)

== Sources ==
- Webb, Whitney Alyse (October 22, 2022). One Nation Under Blackmail - Vol. 2: The Sordid Union Between Intelligence and Organized Crime That Gave Rise to Jeffrey Epstein Vol. 2. Trine Day. ISBN 978-1-63424-302-5.
