= Litigation involving Jeffrey Epstein =

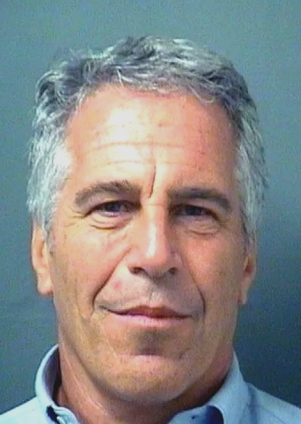
Mug shot of Epstein in 2008

The American financier and child sex offender Jeffrey Epstein ran a ring of female sex traffickers, who were tasked with recruiting underage females into his orbit for his sexual gratification. His close friend and associate, Ghislaine Maxwell, was the chief recruiter and some-time participant in his crimes.

The New York Times in 2019 reported that Sarah Kellen, Lesley Groff, Adriana Ross and Nadia Marcinkova were part of the Epstein system, as well as Haley Robson, and published that "Recruiters were allegedly told to target young, financially desperate women, and to promise them help furthering their education and careers." Rina Oh is another Epstein recruiter who spoke to the press in 2021. Kellen, Groff, Ross and Marcinkova were listed as "unindicted co-conspirators" in the Acosta 2007 plea deal; when Judge Alison Nathan sentenced Maxwell in 2022, she described Kellen as "a knowing participant in the criminal conspiracy" and said she was "a criminally responsible participant". In 2021, Politico magazine wrote:

Epstein essentially was running an enterprise at Royal Palm Beach High School. According to victim testimony given to the Palm Beach police, each teen would earn around $200 if she brought a new friend to Epstein. This spread throughout the school. Although Palm Beach is known for its wealth, surrounding towns are less affluent. For girls from underprivileged families, $200 was a big deal... According to a Palm Beach police report, Epstein once told a victim that he had purchased Marcinkova at age 15 from her family in Yugoslavia to be his sex slave.

Darren Indyke and Richard Kahn, the co-executors of Epstein's estate, have inserted a clause in the estate's victim compensation fund whereby applicants cannot sue Epstein's employees.

== Cordero v. Epstein (2007) ==
On October 16, 2007, Ava Cordero, a transgender woman and aspiring model based in New York City, filed a lawsuit in the New York Supreme Court accusing Epstein of sexually abusing her when she was sixteen years old. She alleged that Epstein made her perform "bizarre and unnatural sex acts" in return for assistance with her modeling career. The lawsuit was dismissed in 2008.

== Jane Doe v. Epstein lawsuits (2008) ==
In 2008, three lawsuits made by anonymous women were filed against Epstein by the lawyer Jeffrey Herman. Each sought $50 million in damages.

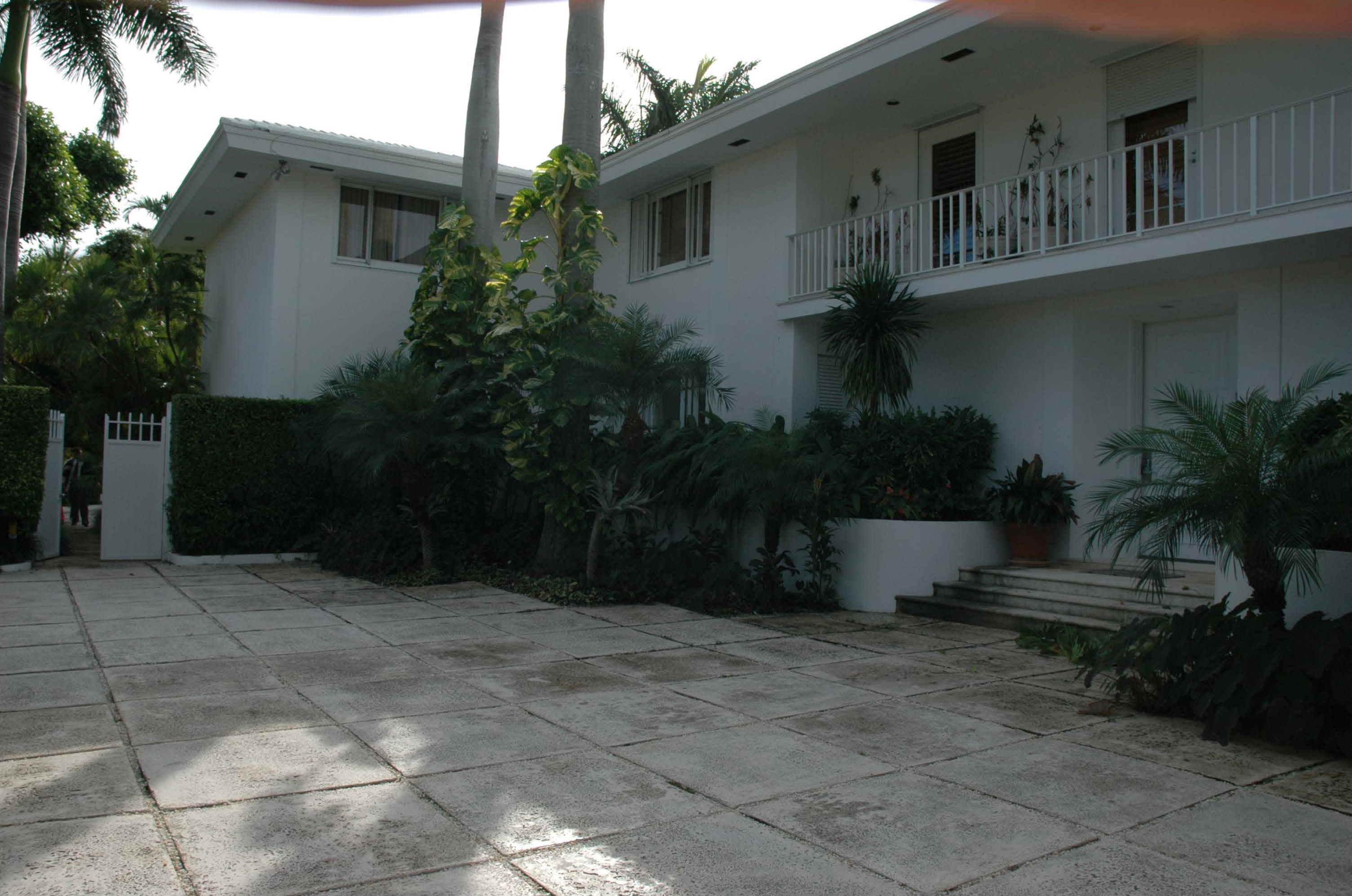
Epstein's Palm Beach mansion during the 2005 police raid in connection with the investigation of Epstein for child sexual abuse. The mansion was since demolished due to its association with child sexual abuse.

On February 6, 2008, an anonymous Virginia woman, known as Jane Doe No. 2, filed a $50-million civil lawsuit in federal court against Epstein, saying that when she was a 16-year-old minor in 2004 and 2005, she was "recruited to give Epstein a massage". She claimed she was taken to his mansion, where he exposed himself and had sexual intercourse with her, and paid her $200 immediately afterward. A second suit was filed on March 5, 2008. A third suit was filed in March 2008 by a different woman. These and several similar lawsuits were dismissed. All other lawsuits had been settled by Epstein out of court.

== Jane Doe 102 v. Epstein (2009) ==
External videos
- How teen runaway Virginia Roberts became one of Jeffrey Epstein's victims Perversion of Justice, Miami Herald, November 30, 2018.

In May 2009, Virginia Roberts Giuffre filed a lawsuit (with Katherine Ezell as her lawyer) as Jane Doe 102 against Epstein and accused Maxwell of recruiting her to a life of being sexually trafficked while she was a minor. The 2009 suit stated that "In addition to being continually exploited to satisfy defendant's [Epstein] every sexual whim, [Ms Giuffre] was also required to be sexually exploited by defendant's adult male peers, including "royalty, politicians, academicians, businessmen and or other professional and personal acquaintances." At the time, she named Epstein and Maxwell but did not identify any of the men. The suit was settled that same year for $500,000 and other unspecified "valuable consideration".

== Epstein v. Scott Rothstein, et al. (2009) ==
Epstein filed a civil racketeering lawsuit in December 2009 in Palm Beach County Circuit Court, against Scott Rothstein (of Rothstein Rosenfeldt Adler) and named one of Rothstein's former associates Bradley J. Edwards. along with L.M., one of Epstein's alleged 14 year old victims. Epstein accused Rothstein of using him to prop up his Ponzi scheme by selling settlement shares. Epstein also alleged that Edwards sought to harass and depose his friends. Epstein dropped the charges against Edwards three years later, in August 2012.

== Bradley Edwards v. Epstein and Rothstein (2009) ==
Victims rights attorney Bradley J. Edwards filed a countersuit against Epstein for malicious prosecution in Florida state civil court. After a protracted legal battle and an appeal the suit was scheduled for trial in December 2018. The trial was expected to provide victims with their first opportunity to make their accusations in public. However, the case was settled on the first day of the trial, with Epstein publicly apologizing to Edwards; other terms of the settlement were confidential.

== Victims' rights: Jane Does v. United States (2014) ==
A December 30, 2014, federal civil suit was filed in Florida by Jane Doe 1 (Courtney Wild) and Jane Doe 2 against the United States for violations of the Crime Victims' Rights Act by the U.S. Department of Justice's NPA with Epstein and his limited 2008 state plea. There was a later, unsuccessful effort to add Virginia Roberts (Jane Doe 3) and another woman (Jane Doe 4) as plaintiffs to that case. The addition accused Alan Dershowitz of sexually abusing a minor, Jane Doe 3, provided by Epstein. The allegations against Dershowitz were stricken by the judge and eliminated from the case because he said they were outside the intent of the suit to re-open the plea agreement. A document filed in court alleges that Epstein ran a "sexual abuse ring", and lent underage girls to "prominent American politicians, powerful business executives, foreign presidents, a well-known prime minister, and other world leaders".

This long-running lawsuit is pending in federal court, aimed at vacating the federal plea agreement on the grounds that it violated victims' rights. On April 7, 2015, Judge Kenneth Marra ruled that the allegations made by alleged victim Virginia Roberts against Prince Andrew had no bearing on the lawsuit by alleged victims seeking to reopen Epstein's non-prosecution plea agreement with the federal government; the judge ordered that allegation to be struck from the record. Judge Marra made no ruling as to whether claims by Roberts are true or false. Though he did not allow Jane Does 3 and 4 to join the suit, Marra specifically said that Roberts may later give evidence when the case comes to court.

On February 21, 2019, in the case of Two Jane Does v. United States, Senior Judge of the U.S. District Court for the Southern District of Florida Kenneth Marra said federal prosecutors violated the law by failing to notify victims before they allowed him to plead guilty to only the two Florida offenses. The judge left open what the possible remedy could be.

== Virginia Giuffre v. Epstein (2015) ==
External videos
- Where are they now? The biggest players in the Jeffrey Epstein case Perversion of Justice, The Miami Herald, November 29, 2018.

In a December 2014 Florida court filing by Bradley Edwards and Paul G. Cassell meant for inclusion in the Crime Victims' Rights Act lawsuit, Virginia Giuffre (then known as Virginia Roberts), alleged in a sworn affidavit that at age 17, she had been sexually trafficked by Epstein and Ghislaine Maxwell for their own use and for use by several others, including Andrew Mountbatten-Windsor and Alan Dershowitz. Giuffre also claimed that Epstein, Maxwell and others had physically and sexually abused her. She alleged that the FBI may have been involved in a cover-up. She said she had served as Epstein's sex slave from 1999 to 2002, and had recruited other underage girls. Epstein, Mountbatten-Windsor, and Dershowitz denied her claims. Dershowitz took legal action over the allegations.

Giuffre filed a defamation suit against Dershowitz, claiming he purposefully made "false and malicious defamatory statements" about her. A diary purported to belong to Giuffre was published online. In January 2015 Epstein entered an out-of-court settlement with Giuffre, as he had done in several other lawsuits. In 2019, Giuffre was interviewed by the BBC's Panorama where she continued to attest that Epstein had trafficked her to Prince Andrew. She appealed directly to the public by stating: "I implore the people in the UK to stand up beside me, to help me fight this fight, to not accept this as being okay." As of January 2015 these accusations had not been tested in any court of law.

== Jean-Luc Brunel v. Epstein (2015) ==
In January 2015, modeling agent Jean-Luc Brunel filed a lawsuit against Epstein in Miami-Dade County court in Florida. The suit alleged that Brunel and MC2 Model Management had lost millions in revenue due to Epstein's high profile legal troubles which prompted model scouts and Elite Model Management to avoid doing business with the agency. The lawsuit was later settled under undisclosed terms.

== Virginia Giuffre v. Ghislaine Maxwell (2015) ==
As a result of Giuffre's allegations and Maxwell's comments about them, Giuffre sued Maxwell for defamation in September 2015. After much legal confrontation, the case was settled under seal in May 2017. The Miami Herald, other media, and Alan Dershowitz filed to have the documents about the settlement unsealed. After the judge dismissed their request, the matter was appealed to the U.S. Court of Appeals for the Second Circuit.

On March 11, 2019, in the appeal of the district judge's refusal to unseal the documents relating to the 2017 defamation settlement of Giuffre v. Maxwell, the Second Circuit Court gave parties one week to provide good cause as to why they should remain under seal, without which they would be unsealed on March 19, 2019. Due to speculation of what prominent names might be exposed related to Epstein’s trafficking of minors, the documents were misrepresented on social media and news outlets as a "list". In testimony, Giuffre claimed that she was "directed" by Maxwell to give erotic massages and engage in sexual activities with Andrew Mountbatten-Windsor; Jean-Luc Brunel; Glenn Dubin; Marvin Minsky; Governor Bill Richardson; another unnamed prince; an unnamed foreign president; a well known Prime Minister; and an unnamed hotel chain owner from France, among others. Giuffre testified: "my whole life revolved around just pleasing these men and keeping Ghislaine and Jeffrey happy. Their whole entire lives revolved around sex."

On August 9, less than 24 hours before Epstein's death, 2,000 pages of previously sealed documents from the case were released. Two sets of additional sealed documents were expected to be analyzed by a federal judge to determine whether they should also be made public. A "John Doe" asked the judge on September 3 to permanently keep the documents secret, claiming "unproven allegations of impropriety" could damage his reputation, though he had no evidence his name was included.

== Jane Doe v. Epstein and Trump (2016) ==
A federal lawsuit filed in California in April 2016 against Epstein and Donald Trump by a California woman alleged that the two men sexually assaulted her at a series of parties at Epstein's Manhattan residence in 1994, when she was 13 years old. The suit was dismissed by a federal judge in May 2016 because it did not raise valid claims under federal law. The woman filed another federal suit in New York in June 2016, but it was withdrawn three months later, apparently without being served on the defendants. A third federal suit was filed in New York in September 2016; the plaintiff, who resided in California, demanded a jury trial. The plaintiff alleged that Epstein raped her "anally and vaginally despite her loud pleas to stop, [and that he] attempted to strike Plaintiff about the head with his closed fists while he angrily screamed that he, Defendant Epstein, rather than Defendant Trump, should have been the one who took Plaintiff's virginity."

The two latter suits included affidavits by a Tiffany Doe who attested to the accusations in the suits, asserting that Epstein employed her to procure underage girls, including Jane at the Port Authority Bus Terminal, for him and that she had witnessed the rape by Epstein; and a Joan Doe who declared the plaintiff had told her about the assaults at the time they occurred. The plaintiff, who had filed anonymously as Jane Doe, was scheduled to appear in a Los Angeles press conference six days before the 2016 U.S. presidential election, but abruptly canceled the event; her lawyer Lisa Bloom asserted that the woman had received threats. The suit was dropped on November 4, 2016. Trump attorney Alan Garten denied the allegations, while Epstein declined to comment.

== Sarah Ransome v. Epstein and Maxwell (2017) ==
In 2017, Sarah Ransome filed a suit against Epstein and Maxwell, alleging that Maxwell had hired her to give massages to Epstein and later threatened to physically harm her or destroy her career prospects if she did not comply with their sexual demands at his mansion in New York City and on his private Caribbean island, Little Saint James. The suit was settled in 2018 under undisclosed terms.

== Maria Farmer v. Epstein and Maxwell (2019) ==
On April 16, 2019, Maria Farmer filed a sworn affidavit in federal court in New York, alleging that she and her 15-year-old sister, Annie, had been sexually assaulted by Epstein and Maxwell in separate locations in 1996. Farmer met Epstein and Maxwell at her graduate art gallery reception at the New York Academy of Art in 1995. The following year, in the summer of 1996, they hired her to work on an art project in Leslie Wexner's Ohio mansion, where she was then sexually assaulted. Farmer reported the incident to the New York City Police Department and the FBI. Farmer's affidavit also stated that during the same summer, Epstein flew her then-15-year-old sister to his New Mexico property where he and Maxwell sexually abused her on a massage table.

== Jennifer Araoz v. Epstein and Maxwell (2019) ==
On July 22, 2019, while in jail awaiting trial, Epstein was served with a petition regarding a pending state civil lawsuit filed by Jennifer Araoz. She stated that an associate for Epstein had recruited her outside Talent Unlimited High School at age 14 and she was gradually groomed for over a year before Epstein raped her in his New York City mansion when she was 15. Araoz filed her suit on August 14, 2019, when New York State law was updated to allow one year for adult survivors of child sexual abuse to sue for previous offenses, regardless of how long ago the abuse took place. In October 2019, Araoz amended her complaint to include over 20 corporate entities associated with Epstein and named the additional individuals Lesley Groff and Cimberly Espinosa as enablers.

== Katlyn Doe, et al. v. Epstein's estate (2019) ==
Three women (Katlyn Doe, Lisa Doe and Priscilla Doe) sued the estate of Jeffrey Epstein on August 20, 2019. Two of the women were 17 and one was 20 when they met Epstein. The women allege they were recruited, subjected to unwanted sex acts, and controlled by Epstein and a "vast enterprise" of co-conspirators.

== Jane Doe v. Epstein's estate (2019) ==
A New York accuser of Epstein, known only as Jane Doe, announced a federal lawsuit against his estate in the Southern District of New York on September 18, 2019, stating that she was recruited in 2002 and sexually abused by Epstein for three years starting at age 14.

== Teresa Helm, et al. v. Epstein's estate (2019) ==
Five women (Teresa Helm, Annie Farmer, Maria Farmer, Juliette Bryant, and an unidentified woman), represented by David Boies, sued Epstein's estate in Federal District Court in Manhattan in November 2019, accusing him of rape, battery and false imprisonment and seeking unspecified damages.

== Jane Doe 15 v. Epstein's estate (2019) ==
On November 18, 2019, a woman identified as Jane Doe 15 made a public appearance with her attorney Gloria Allred to announce that she was suing the estate of Jeffrey Epstein in the District Court for the Southern District of New York, alleging that he manipulated, trafficked, and sexually abused her in 2004, when she was 15-years-old.

== Teala Davies v. Epstein's estate (2019) ==
On November 21, 2019, Teala Davies appeared with her attorney Gloria Allred and announced her lawsuit in Manhattan federal court against Epstein's estate. Davies stated that after meeting Epstein in 2002, he sexually assaulted and trafficked her in New York, New Mexico, Florida, the Virgin Islands and France.

== Jane Does 1–9 v. Epstein's estate (2019) ==
On December 3, 2019, lawyer Jordan Merson filed a lawsuit in New York on behalf of nine anonymous accusers (Jane Does 1–9) and against Epstein's estate for battery, assault, and intentional emotional distress. The claims date from 1985 through the 2000s, and include individuals who were 13, 14, and 15 when they first encountered Epstein.

== JJ Doe v. Epstein's estate (2019) ==
The lawsuit was filed by Bradley Edwards on behalf of his client in late December 2019. The accuser, JJ Doe, is described as being a 14-year-old resident of Palm Beach County at the time Epstein abused her in 2004.

== US Virgin Islands v. Epstein's estate, et al. (2020) ==
Little Saint James, an island previously owned by Epstein

A lawsuit was filed in Superior Court of the U.S. Virgin Islands in January 2020 alleging that Epstein ran a sex trafficking conspiracy for over two decades, through 2018, with children as young as 11-years-old on Epstein's Caribbean islands. According to Attorney General Denise George, his alleged criminal activities on the islands were concealed through a complex network of companies. In February 2021, the lawsuit was amended to include Richard Kahn and Darren Indyke as individuals (previously named only as defendants in their roles as co-executors of Epstein's estate).

== Jane Doe v. Maxwell and Epstein's estate (2020) ==
In January 2020, a lawsuit was filed against Maxwell and Epstein's estate alleging that they recruited a 13-year-old music student at the Interlochen Center for the Arts in 1994 and subjected her to sexual abuse. The suit states that Jane Doe was repeatedly sexually assaulted by Epstein over a four-year period and that Maxwell played a key role in both her recruitment and by participating in the assaults.

== Jane Does v. Epstein estate (2020) ==
In August 2020, nine Jane Does filed suit against the Epstein estate alleging sexual abuse. The alleged victims in the lawsuit include an 11-year-old and a victim who alleged abuse in 1978. The case was dismissed with prejudice in 2020.

== Jane Doe v. Epstein estate (2020) ==
In August 2020, the estate of Epstein was sued by a Jane Doe accusing him of sexually abusing her for over a year, beginning when she was 18.

== Jane Doe v. Epstein estate (2021) ==
In March 2021, a civil suit was filed against Epstein's estate by a Broward County woman, alleging that Epstein and Maxwell had trafficked and repeatedly raped her as a 26 year old, in 2008. She alleged that Epstein forced her to have a vaginal surgery in May 2008, performed "in a wealthy person’s home by a man with a Russian accent".

In 2024, the plaintiff voluntarily withdrew her lawsuit. It was dismissed.

== Jane Doe v. Epstein estate (2021) ==
In October 2021, a class action lawsuit was filed against Epstein's estate by a Russian woman, who alleged that Epstein had raped her for two years during her early 20s. In 2022, the plaintiff terminated her own lawsuit, and it was dismissed with prejudice.

== Government of the United States Virgin Islands v. JPMorgan Chase Bank, N.A. (2022) ==
The U.S. government sued JP Morgan Chase Bank in 2022, alleging that JP Morgan "facilitated, sustained, and concealed the human trafficking network operated by Jeffrey Epstein." A related class action alleged that the bank assisted in the structuring of Epstein's withdrawals of large amounts of cash.

== Stein v. Epstein estate and Maxwell (2023) ==
In 2023, Elizabeth ("Liz") Stein sued the Epstein estate and Ghislaine Maxwell, alleging trafficking and abuse for a period of three years in the 1990s, while in her early 20s. In 2021, Stein had been deemed ineligible for compensation from the Epstein victims fund. The lawsuit was settled in 2024, with Stein receiving compensation without admission of wrongdoing by the estate or Maxwell.

== See also ==
- Estate of Jeffrey Epstein
