= Period room =

Room representing a historical period

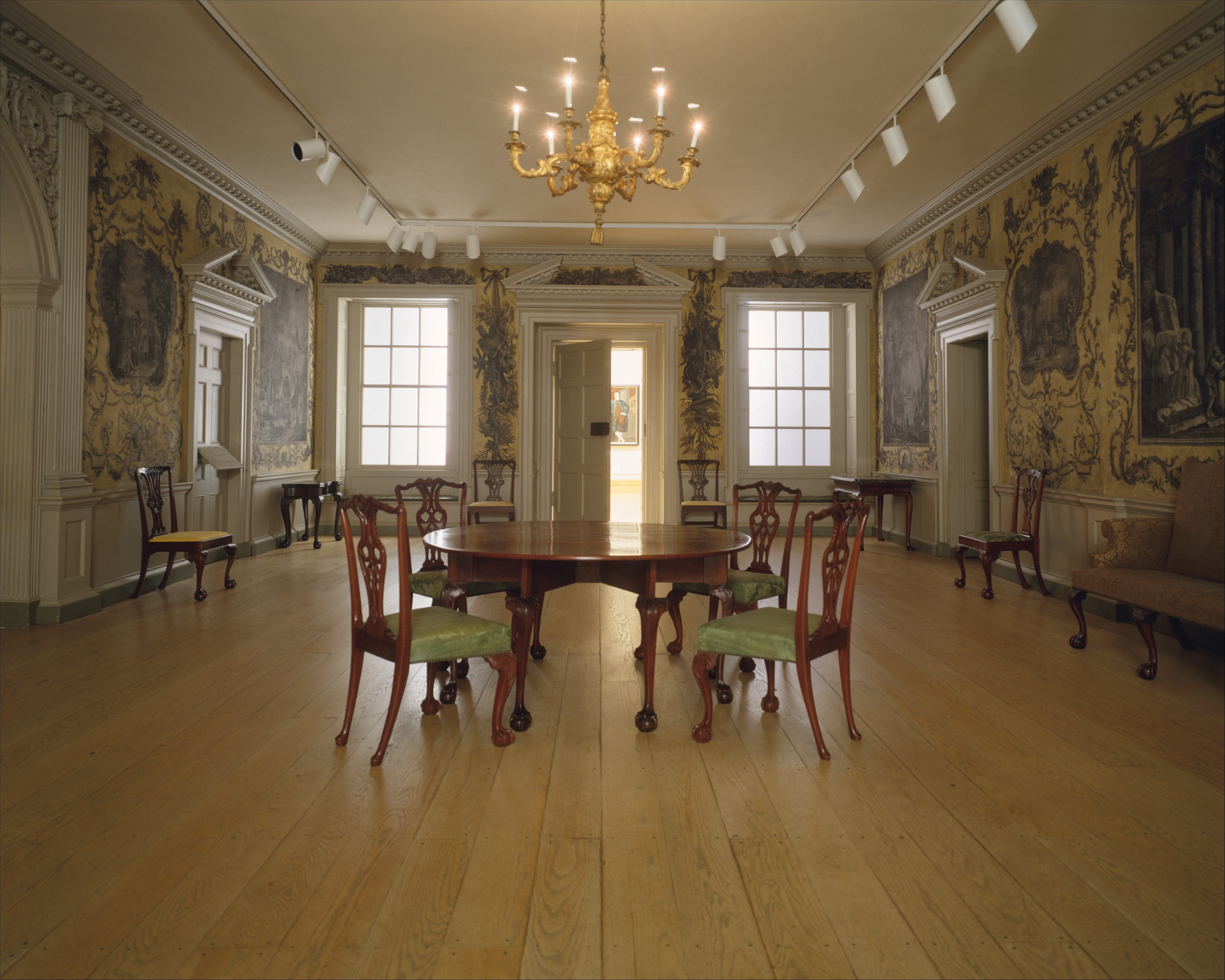
Period room entrance hall from the 18th century Van Rensselaer Manor House originally located in Albany, New York - now in the Metropolitan Museum of Art collection.

A period room is a display that represents the interior design and decorative arts of a particular historical social setting usually in a museum. Though it may incorporate elements of an individual real room that once existed somewhere, it is usually by its nature a composite and fictional piece. Period rooms at encyclopedic museums may represent different countries and cultures, while those at historic house museums may represent different eras of the same structure. As with the glamorization of luxury in costume drama, this can be considered a conservative genre that traditionally privileges Eurocentric elite views. While highly popular among collectors and curators during the late 20th century, the practice has notably declined with a major shift toward using period rooms today in new ways or in diversifying them.

== History ==
The exhibition principle of period rooms originally developed from the presentation of art by aristocratic or upper-middle-class art collectors. In 1832, Alexandre Du Sommerard established a historical collection in Paris that became the Musée de Cluny. He arranged medieval and Renaissance art, furniture, and artifacts into groupings while attempting to replicate their original historical settings. By the late 19th century, this practice of moving furniture and sometimes entire sections of rooms into collections had spread to other parts of Europe. At its opening in 1867, the Bavarian National Museum in Munich exhibited art in the form of architectural elements from Bavaria, primarily ceilings from German castles, but also two interiors: a painted room of the weavers' guild in Augsburg from the 15th century and the so-called Fugger Room from Donauwörth. By the 1870s, similar rooms had opened in museums across Europe in Salzburg, Nuremberg, Paris, and Zurich. One of the earliest examples of what was considered a true period room was created in 1904, when Wilhelm von Bode established the Kaiser-Friedrich Museum in Berlin (now the Bode Museum).

=== Spread to the United States ===
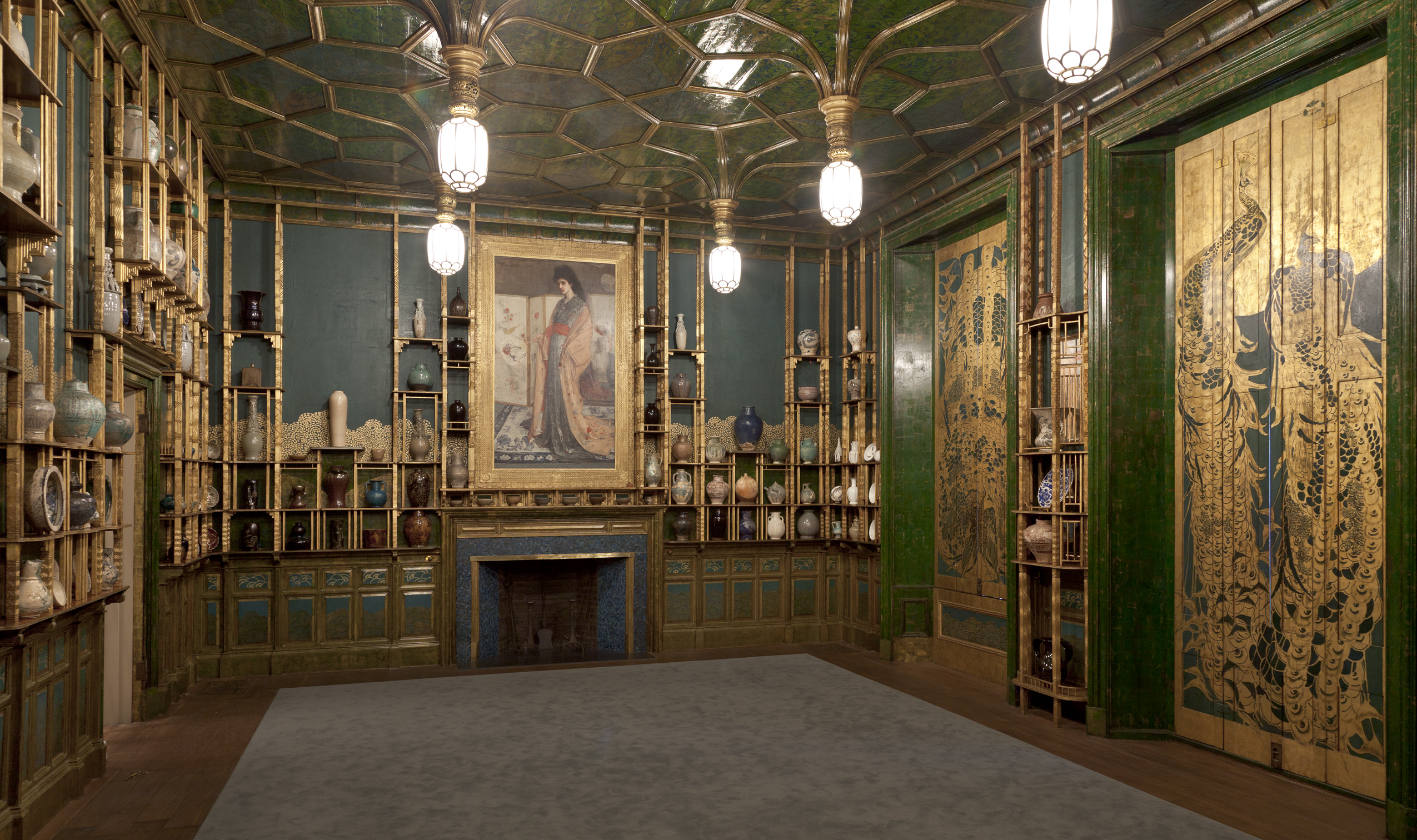
An image of the The Peacock Room installed in the National Museum of Asian Art

After being viewed by American curators and merchants in Switzerland, the practice then spread to North America. Drawing influence from the Swiss model, the first period rooms installed in the United States were incorporated into the Museum of Fine Arts, Boston and the Metropolitan Museum of Art in New York. The first true American period rooms were created by antiquarian George Francis Dow in 1907 for the Essex Institute (now the Peabody Essex Museum) in Salem, Massachusetts, and reflect colonial American history In addition to museums, wealthy collectors also began to ship rooms to incorporate into their mansions. Notable rooms included a replica Venetian palazzo and cloister constructed for Isabella Stewart Gardner in 1903, French parlor rooms for the Herbert N. Straus House, and Spanish elements incorporated into Hearst Castle in 1920. The practice of museum period rooms then further spread to museums such as the Brooklyn Museum, and later the National Museum of American History featuring White House interior replicas.

By the 21st century, the practice had become controversial among curators and critics, who questioned the authenticity and accuracy of period rooms. As a result, the practice underwent a noticeable decline, with museums and institutions including the Smithsonian and the Brooklyn Museum dismantling some or all of their rooms.
