= Herbert N. Straus House =

House in Manhattan, New York

Coordinates: 40.77155°N 73.96654°W

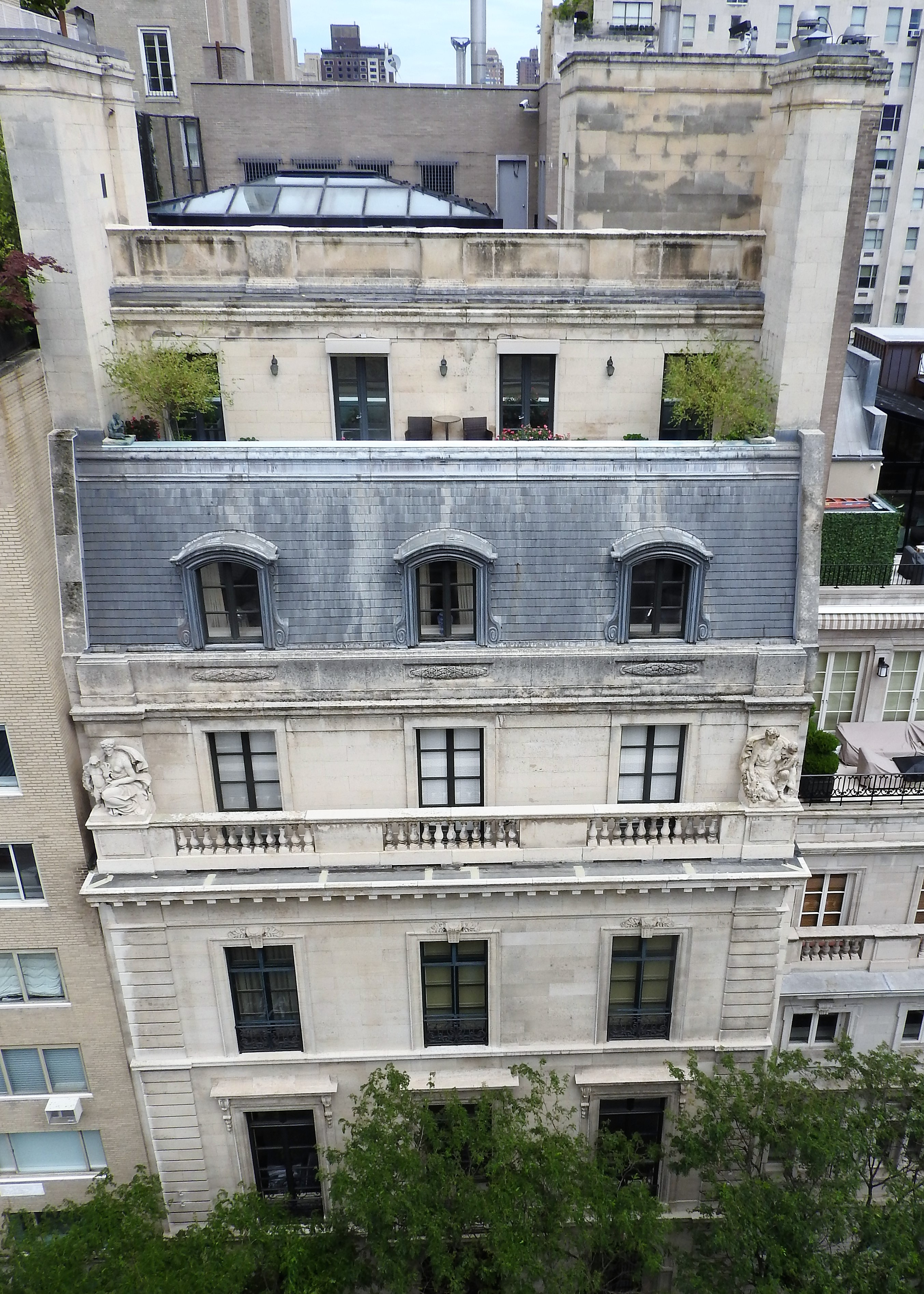
- View of 9 East 71st Street

General information
- Architectural style: French Neoclassical
- Location: 9 East 71st Street, Manhattan, New York City
- Completed: 1932 (exterior)
- Renovated: 1977 (roof extension); c. 1989–1995 and 2022–2025 (major renovation)
- Owner: Michael Daffey (as of 2025)

Technical details
- Material: Limestone (exterior)
- Floor count: 6
- Floor area: 18,814 square feet (1,747.9 m^{2}) (official); 51,000 square feet (4,700 m^{2}) (reportedly, as of 2003)

Design and construction
- Architect: Horace Trumbauer

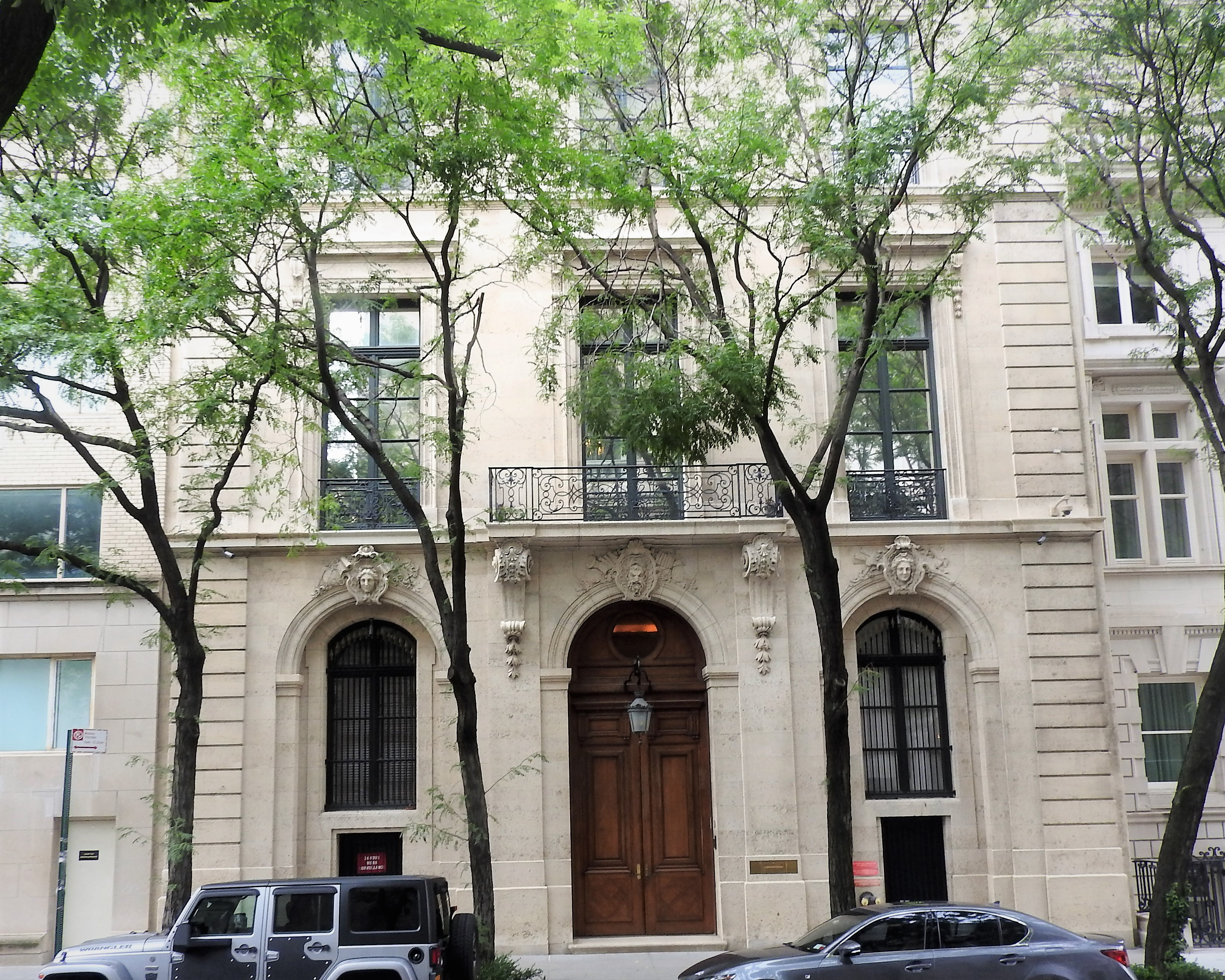
Main entrance of the house

The Herbert N. Straus House is a large town house at 9 East 71st Street, on the north side in the middle of the block just east of Fifth Avenue in the Upper East Side neighborhood of the borough of Manhattan in New York City. The exterior was designed by Gilded Age architect Horace Trumbauer and completed in 1933. Work on the interior was abandoned after Straus's death and would not be fully redesigned until 1995. The size of the house was believed to be 21,000 square feet (2,000 m^{2}) in the late 1980s, and by 2003 had been enlarged to 51,000 square feet (4,700 m^{2}), spread over nine levels, though official records with the New York City Department of City Planning show that it has six stories with 18,814 square feet (1,747.9 m^{2}). A 15-foot-high (4.6 m) oak door and large arched windows are distinctive features of the limestone exterior. A heated sidewalk is located in front of the house.

Vicky Ward in 2003 described the house as "the crown jewel of the city's residential town houses ... it sits on—or, rather, commands—the block of 71st Street between Fifth and Madison Avenues. Almost ludicrously out of proportion with its four- and five-story neighbors, it seems more like an institution than a house" and that it was believed to be the largest private residence in Manhattan. The house's 2008 property tax bill was the fourth highest for a single residence in New York City. In 2019, it was valued at $77 million by the United States Attorney for the Southern District of New York and at $56 million by the New York City Department of Finance.

== History ==
=== Early history ===
Room from a hotel in the Cours d'Albret, Bordeaux, donated to the Metropolitan Museum of Art in 1944

Located directly across the street from the Frick Mansion, the property was commissioned by Herbert N. Straus, the sixth of seven children born to Isidor and Ida Straus (co-owners of retailers R. H. Macy & Co.) Horace Trumbauer, architect of the Philadelphia Museum of Art and Lynnewood Hall in Elkins Park, Pennsylvania, was commissioned to design the building. Original interior plans laid out by Trumbauer and Straus included 18th century period rooms, artworks, and various decorative elements imported from Europe. Despite being nearly complete, all work on the house was cancelled shortly before Straus's death in 1933, and his heirs declined to finish construction due to high property taxes. A French salon from Paris and an oval room from Bordeaux originally intended for the house were later donated to the Metropolitan Museum of Art. The property sat abandoned until it was donated by Straus' sons to the Archdiocese of New York in 1944 for an extension of St. Claire Hospital. The Birch Wathen School acquired and occupied the house from 1962 until 1989, when it was repurchased for $13.2 million by billionaire businessman Leslie Wexner. It was featured in the December 1995 edition of Architectural Digest. The interior of the house was completed under Wexner by John Stefanidis and remodeled by Thierry Despont.

=== Jeffrey Epstein ===
Jeffrey Epstein moved into the house in 1995, at which time he claimed to own it; however, its registered ownership changed in 2011 from a trust connected to both Wexner and Epstein to a trust controlled solely by Epstein. Vicky Ward visited Epstein at the house for "The Talented Mr Epstein", her 2003 profile in Vanity Fair magazine. Ward wrote that she felt that upon entering the house "you feel you have stumbled into someone’s private Xanadu. This is no mere rich person's home, but a high-walled, eclectic, imperious fantasy that seems to have no boundaries". Rows of 'individually framed eyeballs' manufactured for injured English soldiers decorated the entrance hall along with a 'twice-life-size sculpture of a naked African warrior'. A room described as a "leather room" had leopard print chairs with walls decorated in "cordovan-colored fabric". A large 'Oriental fantasy of a woman holding an opium pipe and caressing a snarling lionskin' hung on the walls.

A large office spanned the width of the house, decorated with a large Persian rug alongside '18th-century black lacquered Portuguese cabinets' and a desk that belonged to the banker J. P. Morgan. A copy of Justine, or The Misfortunes of Virtue by the Marquis de Sade, which tells the tale of the sexually abused 12-year old protagonist of the novel, was on the desk. A Steinway grand piano was surmounted by a stuffed black poodle. Epstein told Ward that "No decorator would ever tell you to do that ... But I want people to think what it means to stuff a dog". The French decorator Alberto Pinto was responsible for much of the interior. The house has a bathroom lined in lead with closed-circuit television. The New York City Police Department (NYPD) and FBI agents raided the house in July 2019 as part of a federal investigation into sex trafficking allegations against Epstein.

==== Gallery ====
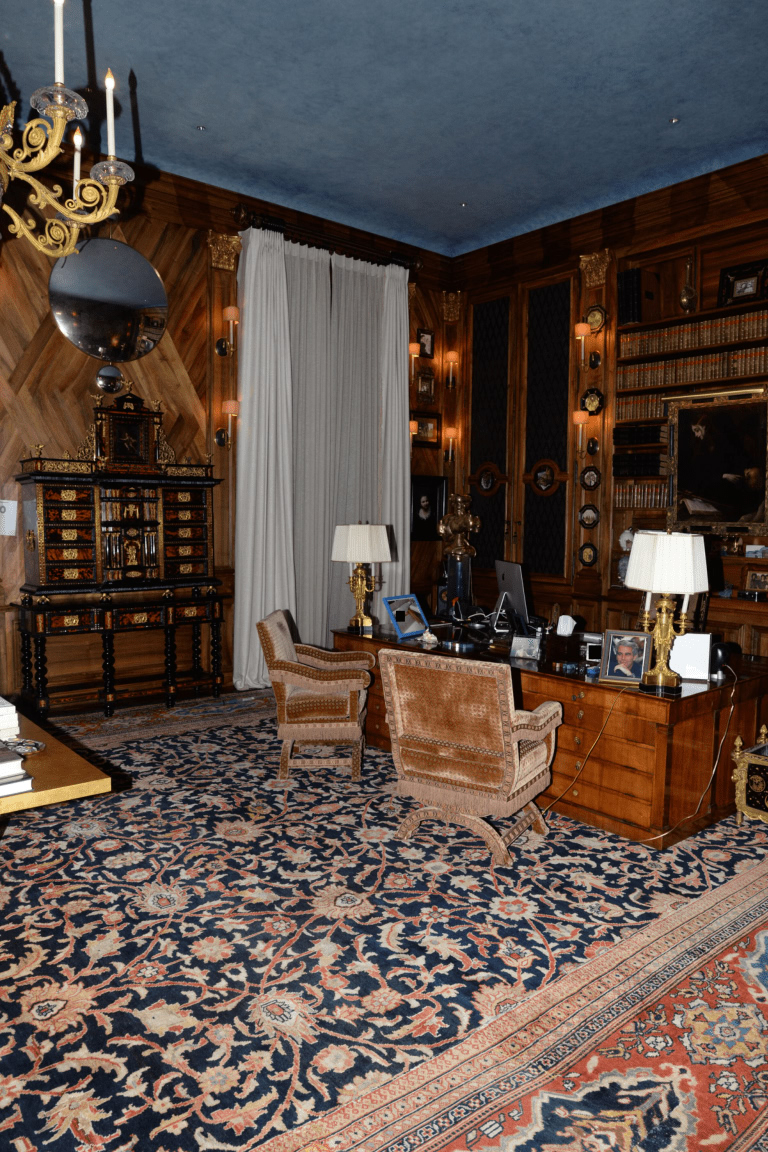
Epstein's office room in 2019

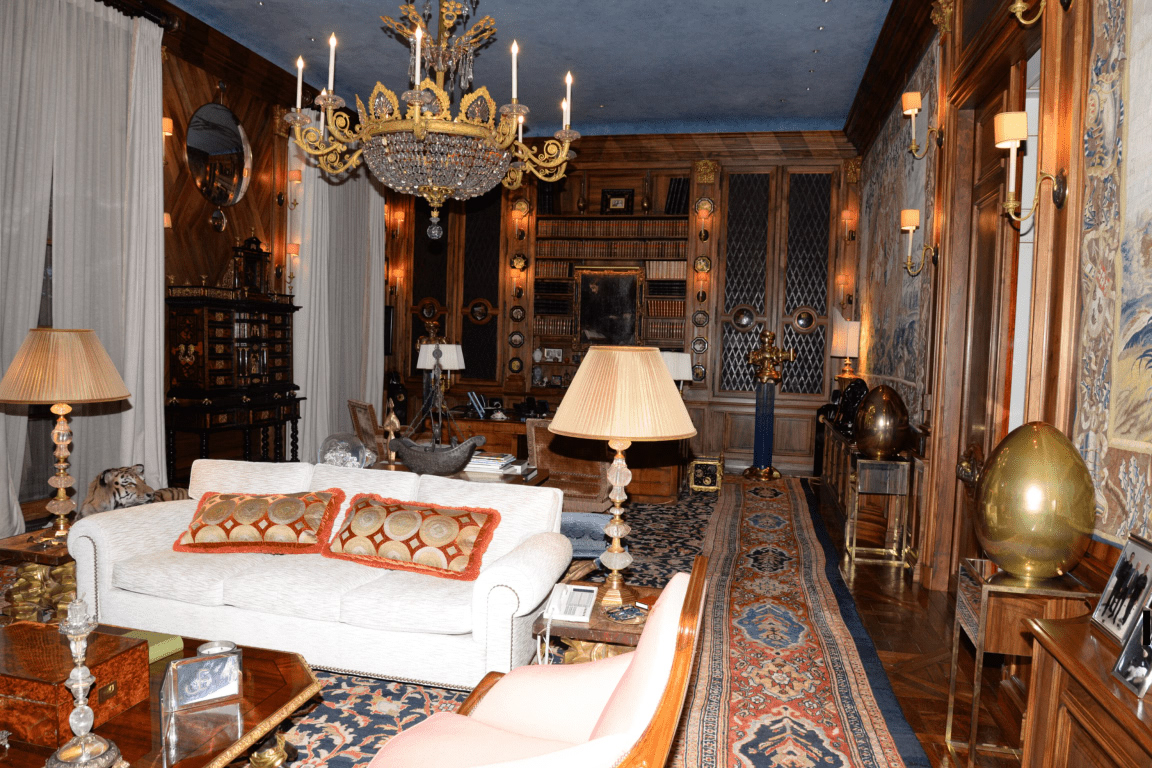
The office room

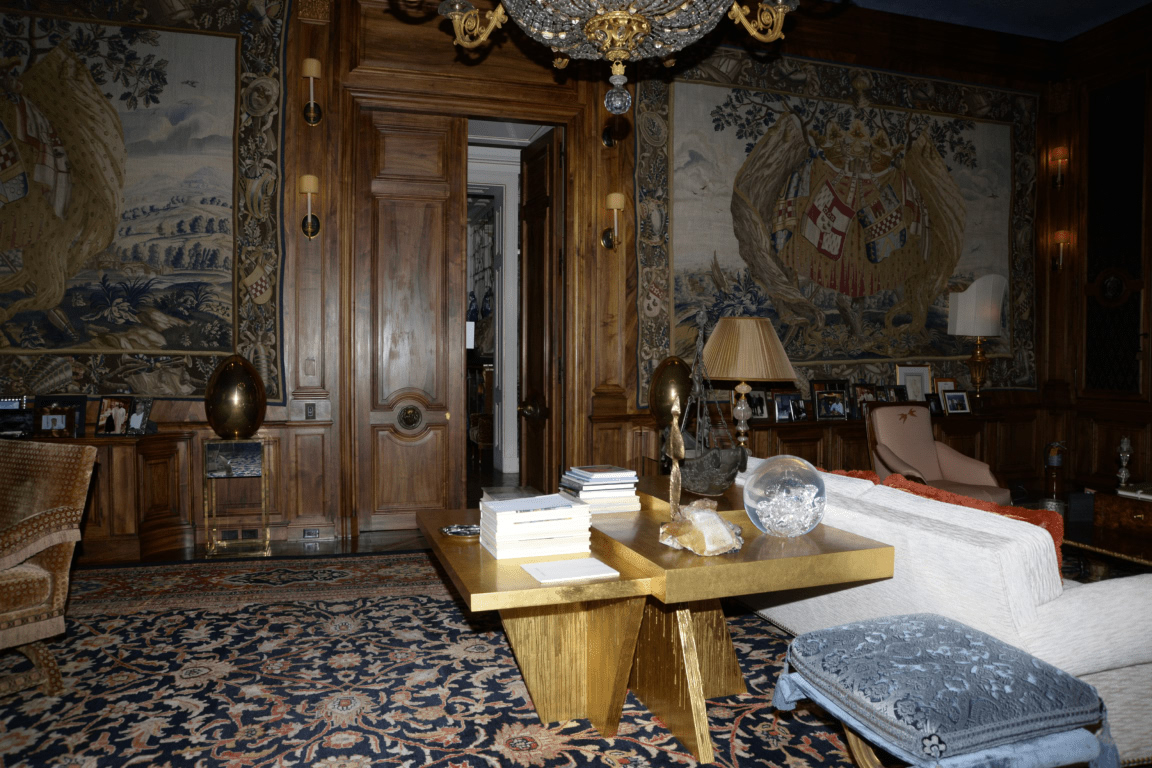
The doors inside the office room

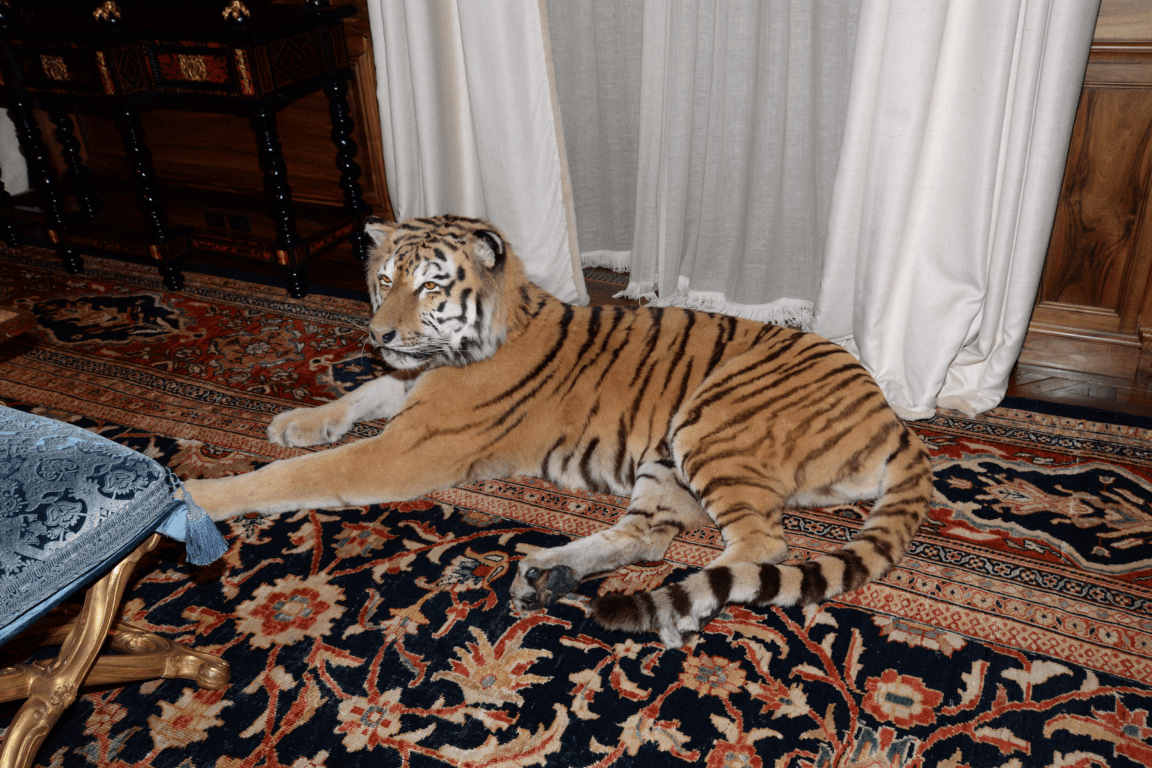
Life-size tiger mannequin in the office room

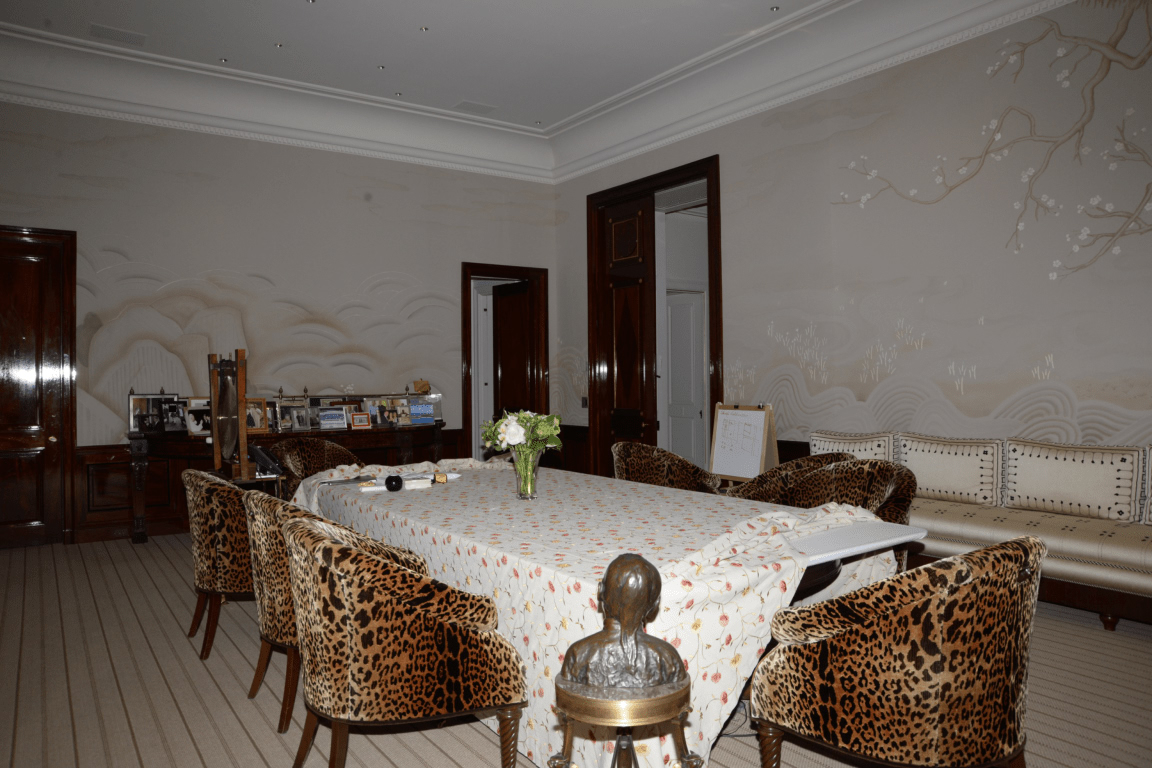
Meeting room with leopard print chairs

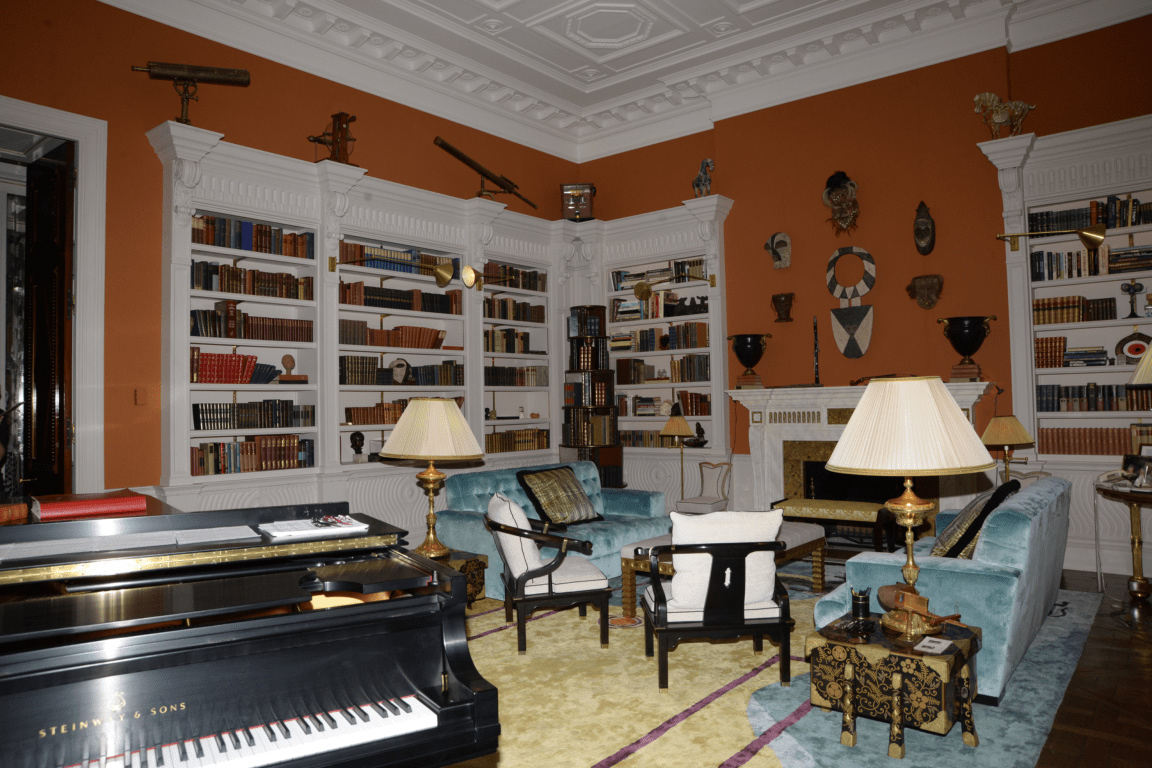
The Piano room

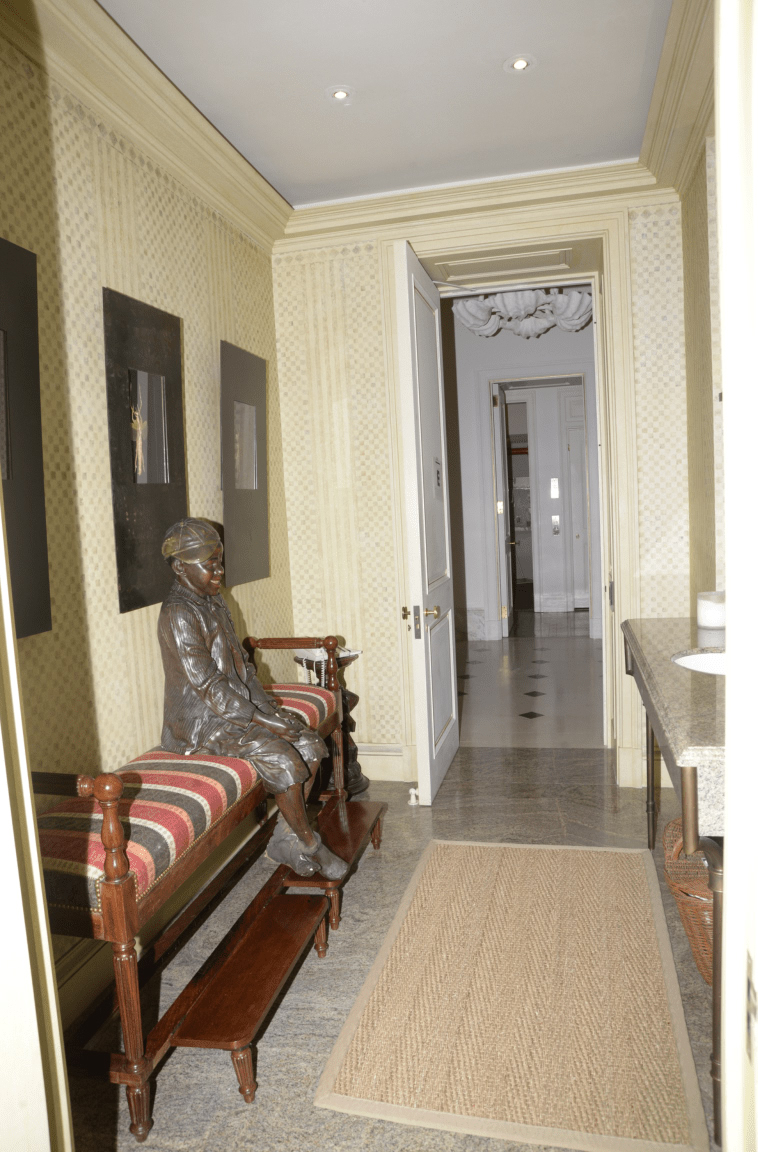
Seated Boy sculpture by Austrian artist Friedrich Goldscheider

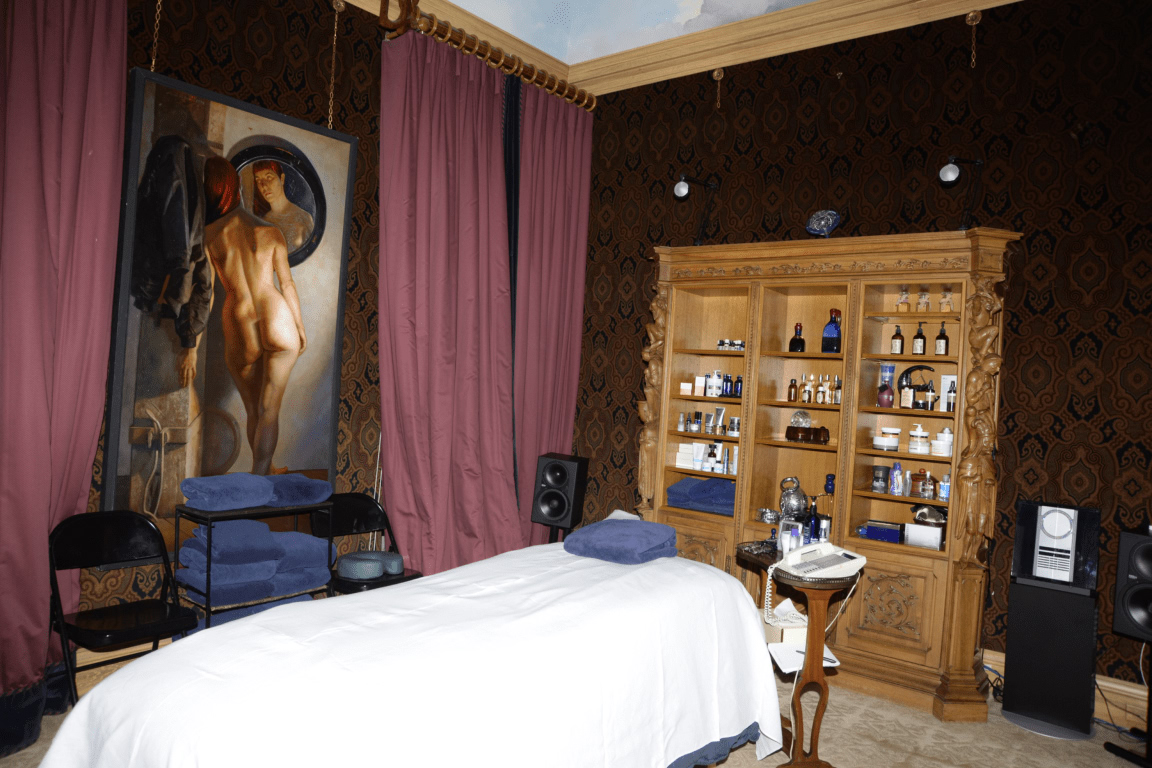
Massage room with a foldable massage table

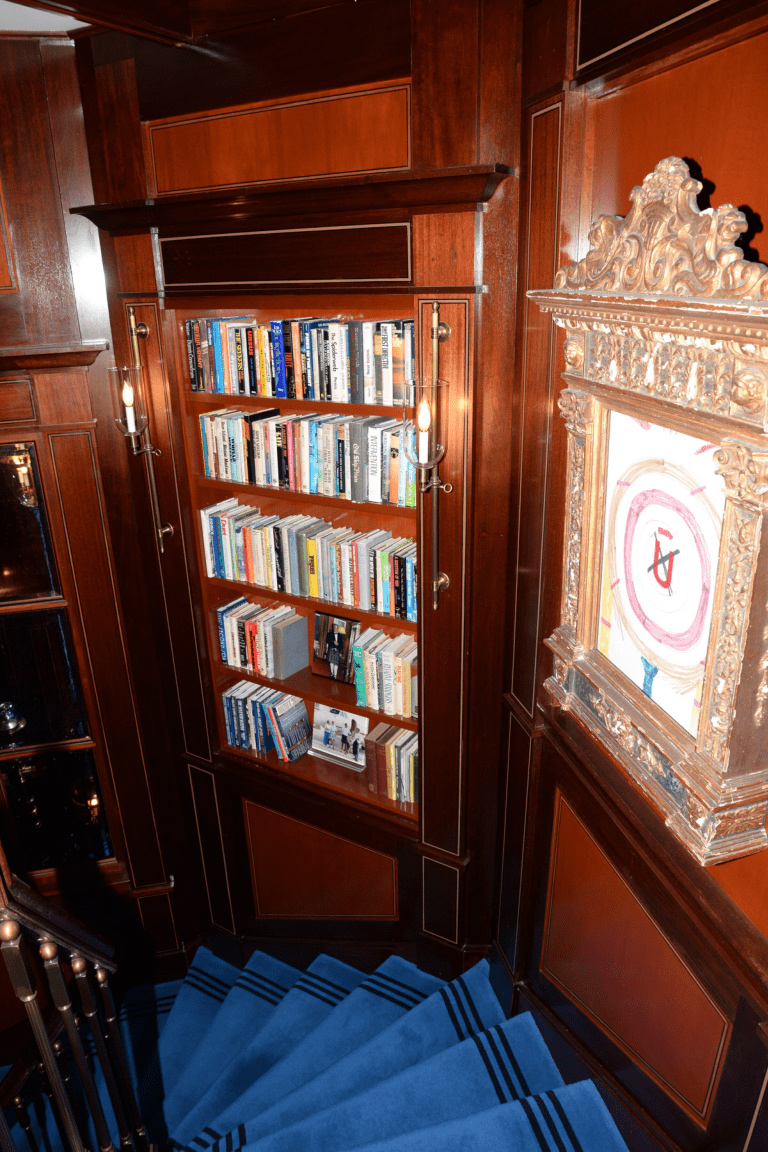
Spiral staircase with bookshelves around

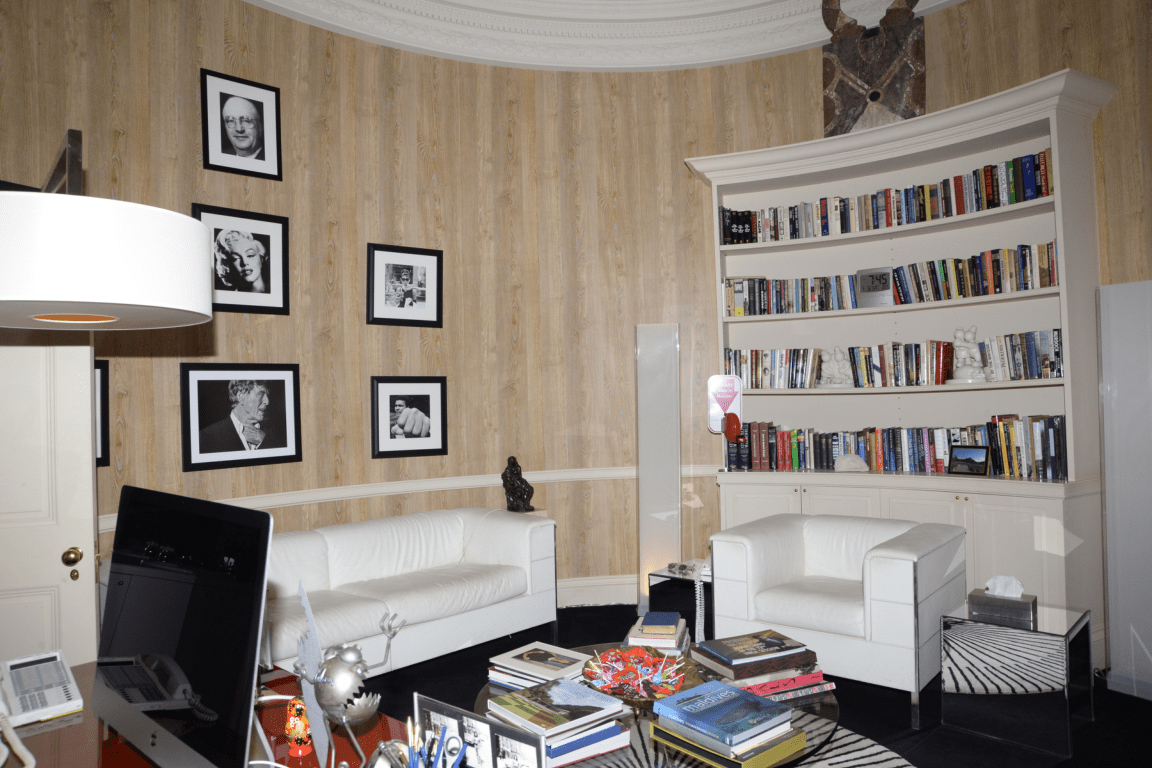
One of several office spaces

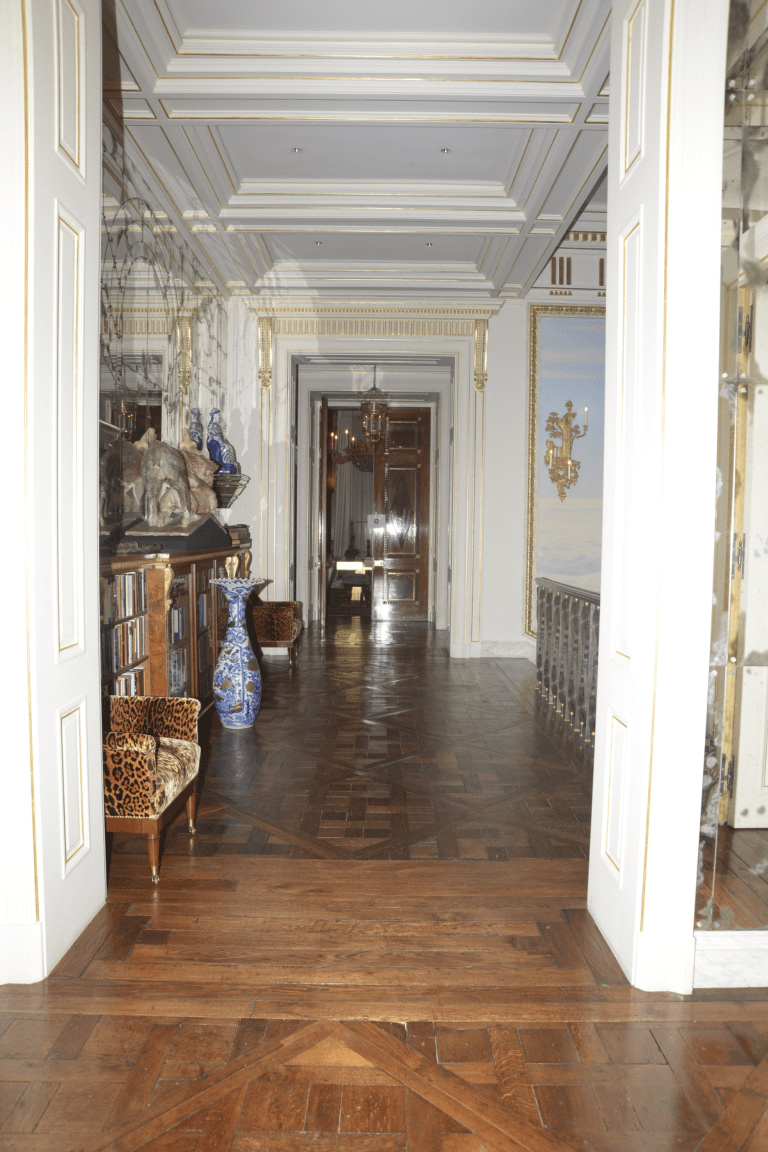
Hallway

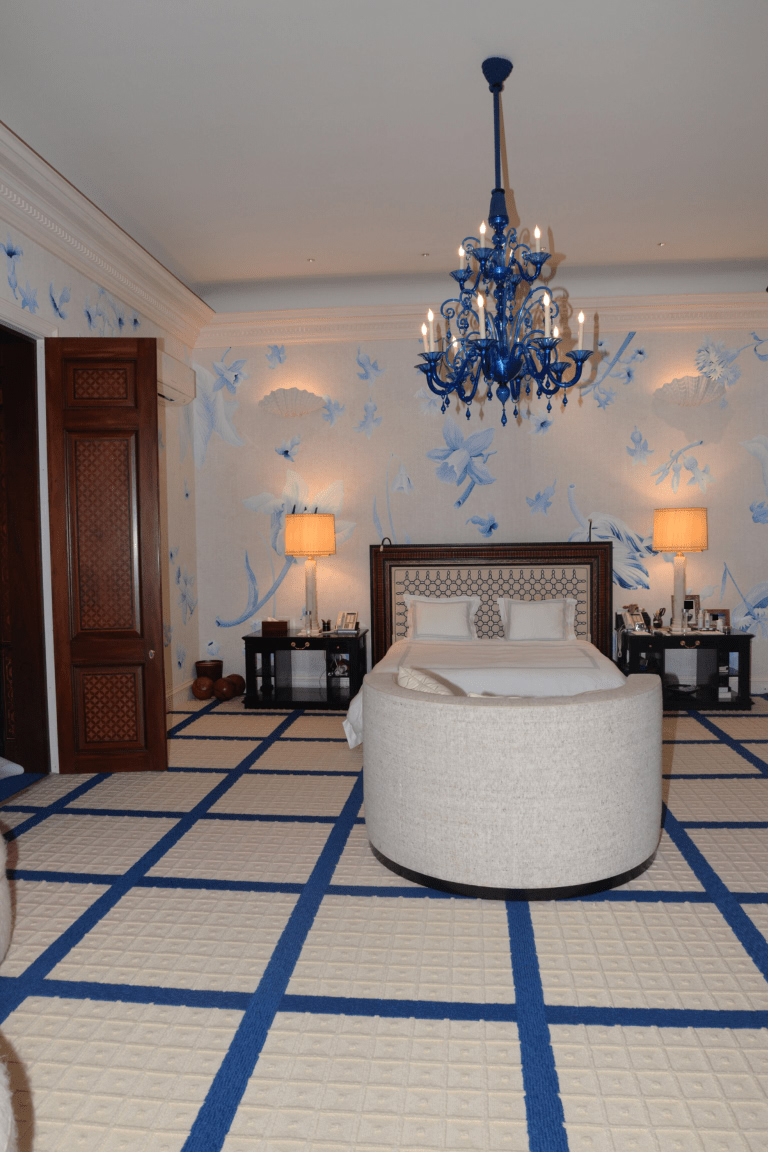
One of the bedrooms

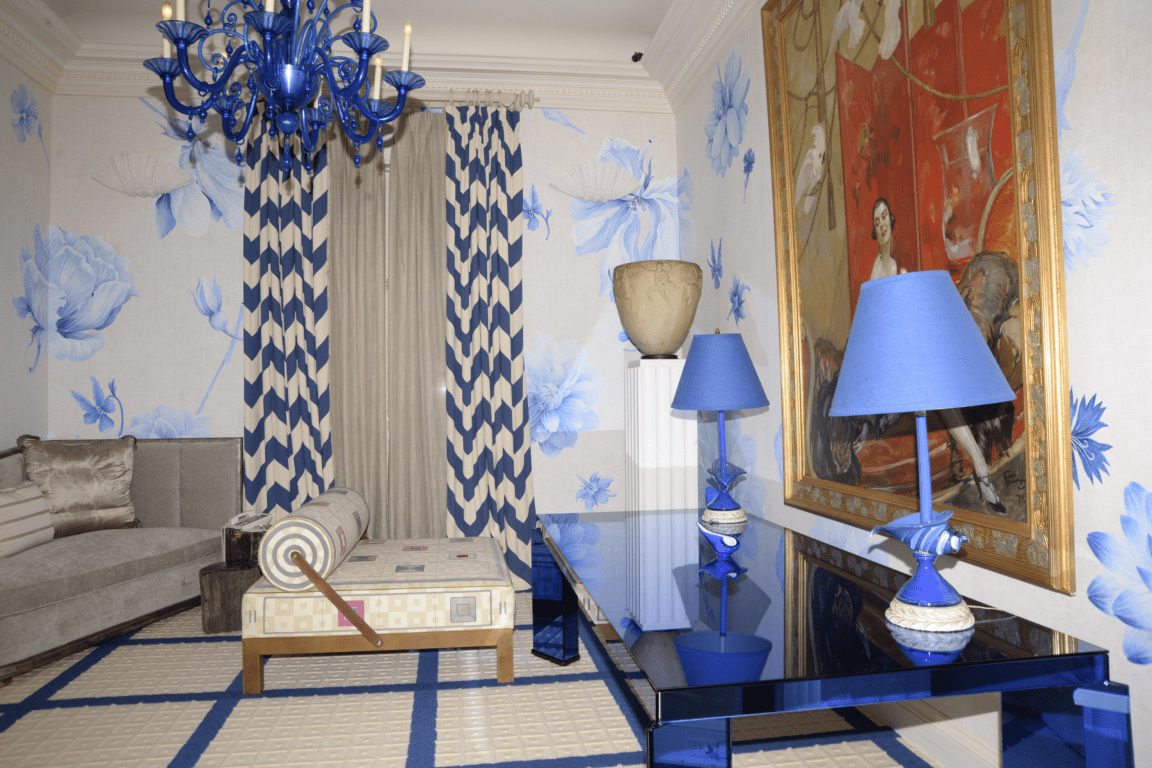
The bedroom with a camera in the ceiling corner and the painting Mlle Spinelly by Domergue

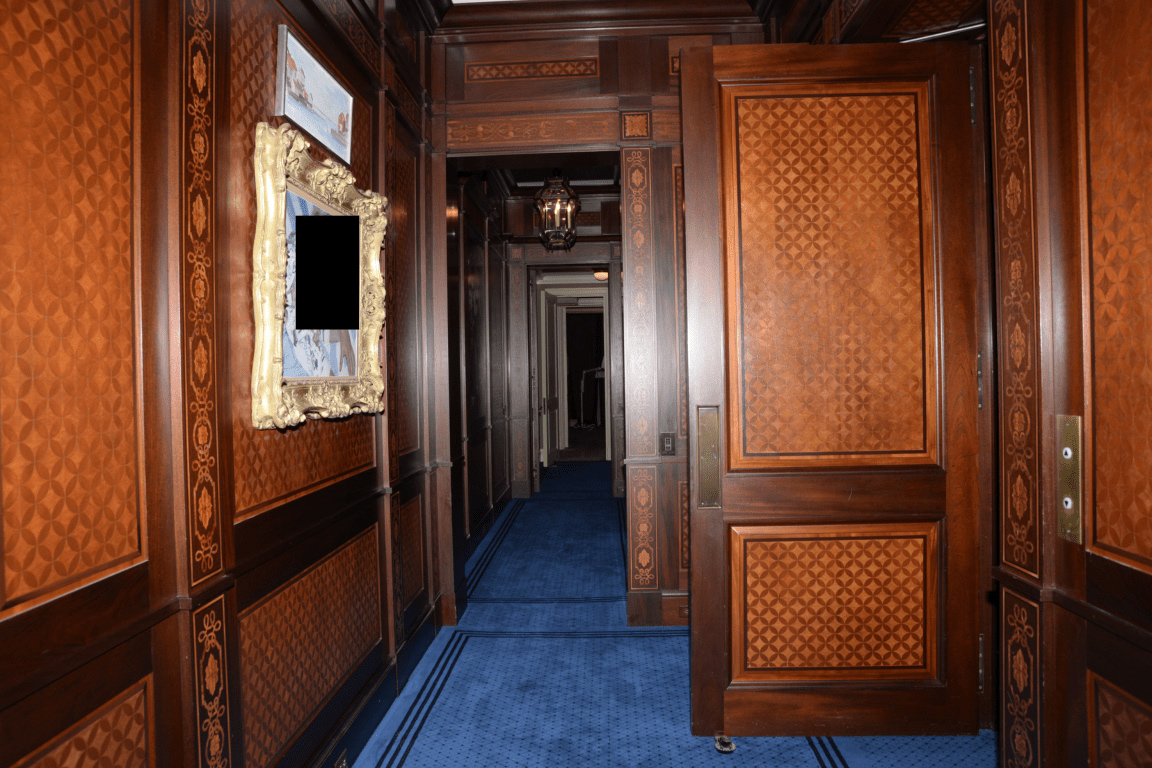
Long narrow hallways with dark wood paneling

=== 2021 sale ===
In March 2021, former Goldman Sachs executive Michael Daffey purchased the building for $51 million, with proceeds from the sale going to the Epstein Victims' Compensation Program. Daffey secured a $30.6 million loan from Citigroup to purchase the building and announced plans to renovate the house. The renovation was completed in 2025.
