= Two Jane Does v US =

Jane Doe #1 and Jane Doe #2 vs United States of America is a civil action in the US District Court in Florida, which has led to allegations of inappropriate behavior being made against Alan Dershowitz and Prince Andrew, Duke of York.

Dershowitz has made a legal declaration denying allegations against him made by a woman referred to as "Jane Doe #3".
