= Lolita Express =

Boeing 727 once owned by Jeffrey Epstein

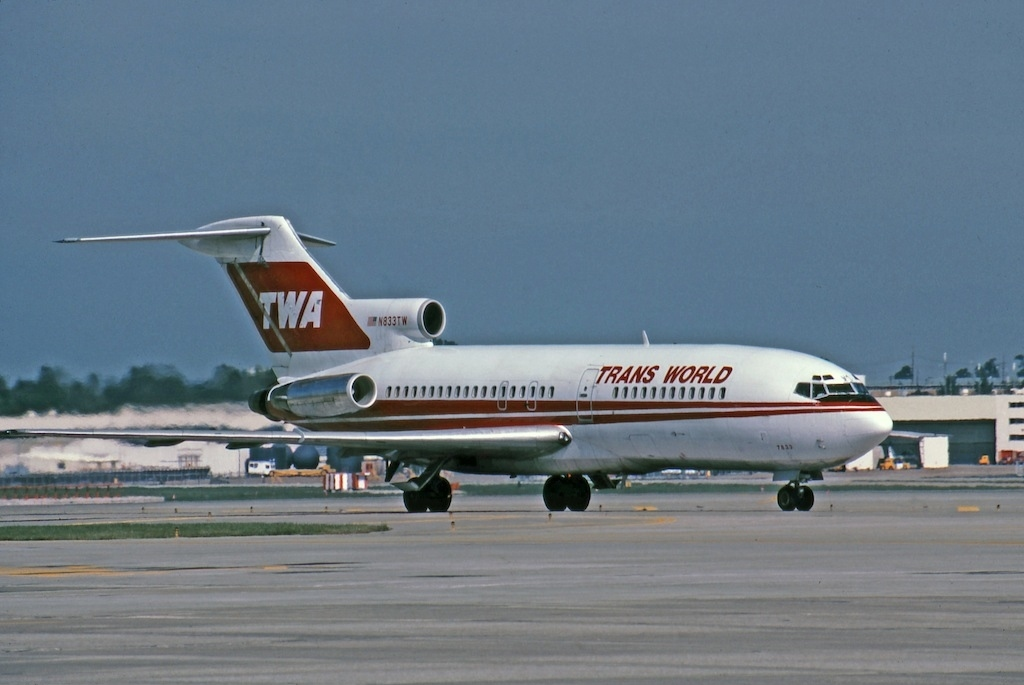
- Boeing 727-100 similar to Lolita Express; Epstein's aircraft was originally part of the TWA fleet.

General information
- Type: Boeing 727-100
- Owners: 1969–1979 TWA; 2001–2016 JEGE, Inc. (Jeffrey Epstein)
- Registration: N908JE

History
- First flight: June 25, 1969 (with TWA)
- Fate: Sold and scrapped

The "Lolita Express" is the nickname used in the media for a Boeing 727-100 aircraft that was owned by American financier and child sex offender Jeffrey Epstein. Epstein traveled in the airplane frequently, logging "600 flying hours a year ... usually with guests on board". Epstein sold the aircraft in 2017. The aircraft was registered N908JE and owned by JEGE, Inc. The media nickname derives from Vladimir Nabokov's 1955 novel about a man's obsession with and victimization of a 12-year-old girl, Lolita. As of 2026, the jet has spent a decade in storage at Brunswick Golden Isles Airport in Georgia.

== Aircraft ==
Boeing 727-100 (registration N908JE, serial number 20115) was a VIP-configured aircraft featuring a 29-passenger interior. As of late 2007, the airframe had logged 33,555 flight hours and 22,282 cycles. The aircraft underwent a performance upgrade via the "Super 27" engine conversion, utilizing two Pratt & Whitney JT8D-219 engines in the outboard positions and a JT8D-7B in the center. It was further modified with Winglet Systems Inc. winglets, RVSM approval, and long-range fuel tanks, bringing its maximum takeoff weight to 174,500 lb (79,200 kg).

The custom "Exogrid" modular interior included a forward salon with a home theater, a mid-cabin lounge and galley, and a private aft stateroom equipped with a queen-size bed and an en-suite lavatory featuring a European-style shower. Technical upgrades included a Honeywell EFIS flight deck, TCAS II, and dual Universal GPS/FMS systems. The aircraft was maintained under an MSG-3 program.

== Notable guests and flights ==
In September 2002, Epstein flew Bill Clinton, Kevin Spacey, and Chris Tucker to Africa in this jet. Flight records obtained in 2016 show Clinton flew 27 times on the same jet to at least a dozen international locations. Flight logs do not list any Secret Service detail for at least five flights on a 2002 trip to Asia, and the Secret Service has stated that there is no evidence of the former president making a trip to Epstein's private island. In 2019, a Clinton spokesperson stated that, in 2002 and 2003, Clinton took four trips on Epstein's airplane, making stops on three continents, all with his staff and Secret Service detail. At the time of Epstein's 2019 arrest, Clinton's spokeswoman Angel Ureña stated that Clinton had "not spoken to Epstein in well over a decade, and has never been to Little Saint James, Epstein's ranch in New Mexico, or his residence in Florida".

In 2009, Epstein's brother, Mark Epstein, claimed Donald Trump had flown on the plane at least once. He later told The Washington Post that Trump flew "numerous times" on Epstein's airplane, although Mark was present on only one of the flights. According to Michael Corcoran, Trump flew Epstein on his own airplane at least once. In a conversation with author Michael Wolff recorded in 2017, Epstein claimed that Trump and his third wife, Melania Trump, had sexual intercourse for the first time onboard the aircraft. Nadia Marcinko was a regular pilot with Epstein on the aircraft. In 2011, The Daily Telegraph reported that the plane had once landed at the Royal Air Force station, RAF Marham. It has been alleged that Andrew Mountbatten-Windsor "pulled strings" so that Epstein could use the RAF base.

Former Colombian president Andrés Pastrana Arango has said that, in 2003, he flew to Cuba with Epstein aboard his plane at the invitation of Cuban president Fidel Castro. Other notable passengers who travelled on the aircraft included businessman Ron Burkle, model Naomi Campbell, lawyer Alan Dershowitz, and the former United States secretary of the treasury Larry Summers. Epstein also owned a Gulfstream G550 jet.

== Allegations of sex crimes on board ==
Epstein accuser Virginia Giuffre alleged being raped on the plane by Alan Dershowitz, which Dershowitz denied as an "outrageous lie". Giuffre retracted her allegations against Dershowitz in 2022.
