= Nadia Marcinko =

Slovak pilot and flight instructor

Nadia Marcinkova
- Born: 1986 (age 39–40); Košice, Czechoslovakia (now Slovakia)
- Other names: Nada Marcinko; Naďa Marcinková; Nadežda Marcinková; N E M
- Occupations: Pilot; Model
- Known for: Pilot for Jeffrey Epstein
- Website: AviLoop.com

Nadia Marcinko (born 1986), also known as Nada Marcinkova (Slovak: Naďa Marcinková), is a Slovak-born pilot, flight instructor and CEO of aviation website Aviloop. Marcinko is a well-known former partner of American sex offender Jeffrey Epstein.

== Career ==
In multiple sources references are made by Marcinko herself to being a model, particularly in her teen years. However, it is not clear whether her references to modeling are about her early life in Europe or the period after she came to the United States. She described her transition from modeling to becoming a pilot by saying she was "ready for longer runways" and went from "runway to runway".

In August 2019, Business Insider reported that depositions taken in relation to the Epstein case disputed that she had been a model. Other sources also dispute her modeling background. Marcinko started flight training at a flight school at Palm Beach County Park Airport. As of 2019, she held three rating certificates: for single-engine aircraft, multi-engine aircraft, and various Gulfstream business jets.

Marcinko became known on social media under the name "Gulfstream Girl". Gulfstream Aerospace filed a trademark infringement suit (Gulfstream Aerospace Corporation v. Aviloop LLC et al.) against her on November 18, 2013. Marcinko and Gulfstream reached an out-of-court settlement, filed on January 6, 2014, after which Marcinko changed her online name to "Global Girl". As of 2019, she remained CEO of her aviation business Aviloop, described by Wired as a "supremely odd aviation branding business, whose website features flawless shots of her with Gulfstreams." The business is based at an address in New York in a building majority-owned by Mark Epstein, brother of Jeffrey Epstein.

== Association with Jeffrey Epstein ==
Several media outlets have reported that Marcinko worked as a long-term assistant to Jeffrey Epstein and was a regular pilot of Epstein's so-called Lolita Express after she received a pilot's license in 2012. Earliest reports from victims in Palm Beach police reports in 2005–2006 alleged that Epstein instructed Marcinko to join in the sex acts with recruited victims. During interviews, one victim claimed that Epstein had bragged about having "purchased" Marcinko and bringing her to the United States to be his "Yugoslavian sex slave". Marcinko's father, Peter Marcinko, has declined to comment on media speculation, stating "we've already learned all sorts of things about ourselves from the media."

Marcinko was reportedly identified as one of Epstein's accomplices (the others being Sarah Kellen, Adriana Ross, and Lesley Groff) given immunity from prosecution in Epstein's non-prosecution agreement from 2008. During Epstein's first incarceration from 2008 to 2009, Marcinko visited him 67 times. In 2010, following his release, she was documented still living at his Palm Beach estate. The Guardian reported that Marcinko was questioned by lawyers amidst 2010 lawsuits against Epstein.

In 2015, The Telegraph reported that during police questioning Marcinko had "invoked her right not to incriminate herself, protected by the Fifth Amendment of the United States Constitution", when she was asked about Andrew Mountbatten-Windsor, who was a frequent guest of Epstein. In September 2019, a CNN article stated that Marcinko may be a "victim" of Epstein as well as an "accomplice". CNN also quoted Marcinko's lawyers who said: "Like other victims, Nadia Marcinko is and has been severely traumatized", and that "[s]he needs time to process and make sense of what she has been through before she is able to speak out".

== Personal life ==
Marcinko was born Nadia Marcinkova in eastern Czechoslovakia (now Slovakia). Her father, Peter Marcinko, is an architect from Prešov, Slovakia. It was incorrectly reported that Marcinko was from Yugoslavia. Her father denied speculation she was brought as a young girl to the U.S. to live with Epstein. By 2019, she had changed her name to Nadia Marcinko. Marcinko has disappeared from public life in early January 2024. The Independent suggested that her disappearance may be linked to the release of the final batch of Epstein documents that same month. She has since been spotted at a Zen Buddhist centre in New York.

== See also ==
- Ghislaine Maxwell
- Julie K. Brown
- Virginia Roberts Giuffre
