= Luke Rudkowski =

American journalist and activist (born 1986/7)

- Rudkowski in 2022
- Born: c. 1986–1987 (age 39–40)
- Citizenship: United States
- Occupations: Journalist, activist

Luke Rudkowski (born 1986 or 1987) is an American independent journalist and activist. He is the founder of the We Are Change media organization.

== Life and career ==
Rudkowski is the son of Polish immigrants to the United States. He first gained public attention for his activism in the 9/11 truth movement, and became known for his videos publicly confronting politicians and other high-profile figures. Rudkowski was one of the most well-known live streamers covering the Occupy movement along with Tim Pool. Rudkowski, Pool and three others were arrested in May 2012 while covering a Chicago anti-NATO protest, but were later released without charge. In late 2019, Rudkowski along with activist Jeff Berwick trespassed onto Jeffrey Epstein's private island of Little Saint James and filmed the premises, though were quickly forced to leave by staff.

Rudkowski runs a YouTube channel with over 500,000 subscribers. The New York Times in 2018 described the channel as promoting conspiracy theories.

=== We Are Change ===
Rudkowski founded We Are Change in 2006 as a group of "patriot journalists" with its subjects of interest including 9/11, the "one world order", and the financing of the military industrial complex. By 2010, it had grown into a loose-knit network of 200 chapters, mostly in the United States. The Southern Poverty Law Center has classified We Are Change as part of the Patriot movement.
