= Berwick (surname) =

Berwick is an English and Scottish surname, originating from the places of Berwick-upon-Tweed on the English-Scottish border, Berwick, Kent, Berwick, Shropshire, Berrick, Oxfordshire, Barwick, Norfolk and Barwick, Yorkshire.

== Notables with this name include ==
- Andrew Berwick, anglicised pseudonym of Norwegian terrorist Anders Behring Breivik
- Baron Berwick, a title
- Berwick (cricketer) (first name unknown)
- Dennison Berwick (born 1956), author
- Donald Berwick (born 1947), American professor of pediatrics and health care policy
- Duke of Berwick, a title in the Peerage of England
- Eleanor Berwick (born 1943), English wine-grower
- Harry Berwick (1923–1988), Australian golfer
- James FitzJames, 1st Duke of Berwick (1670–1734)
- Jeff Berwick (born 1970), Canadian businessperson and adventurer
- Kester Berwick (1903–1992), Australian actor, playwright, and author
- Nicola Berwick, (born in 1978) stunt actress
- Stephan Berwick (born 1964), American author, martial artist, and actor
- William Berwick (footballer) (1884–1948), English footballer
- William Edward Hodgson Berwick (1888–1944), English mathematician
