= Estate of Jeffrey Epstein =

Post-mortem revocable trusteeship for Jeffrey Epstein's US assets

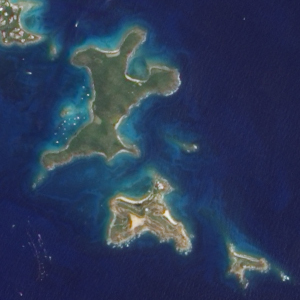
- Jeffrey Epstein's private islands in the U.S. Virgin Islands pictured in 2008. Epstein purchased Little Saint James (lower middle) in 1998, and the neighboring Great Saint James (upper middle) in 2016. Both islands were eventually sold by Epstein's estate.
- Formation: August 15, 2019; 7 years ago
- Type: Estate
- Legal status: Active
- Headquarters: Saint Thomas, Virgin Islands
- Executor: Darren Indyke; Richard Kahn

The estate of the financier and convicted sex offender Jeffrey Epstein was established on August 15, 2019, five days after his death, for the purpose of administering his property and settling his legal issues. The estate was created when Epstein's last will and testament was filed in the Superior Court of the U.S. Virgin Islands.

Epstein's will named his lawyer, Darren Indyke, and his accountant, Richard Kahn, as joint executors of his estate. The estate is organized as a revocable trust called the 1953 Trust, and it will pay out the remainder of Epstein's fortune to trustees upon the resolution of all claims against the estate. Epstein's estate was valued at over $577 million at the time of his death, but it has since decreased in value to around $120 million due to ongoing costs. The estate has been the subject of numerous lawsuits and legal inquiries, including two Congressional subpoenas by the House Oversight Committee.

== Background ==
=== Epstein's fortune ===
Epstein's net worth is not publicly known. According to a CBS News analysis, at the time of his death, Epstein's assets totaled over $577 million; however, a Miami Herald investigation in 2019 based on Paradise Papers and Swiss Leaks documents concluded that Epstein had an interest in offshore funds which may obscure his true wealth and The New York Times has claimed that "Epstein's fortune may be more illusion than fact."

Epstein's fortune at the time he died included numerous properties, including the islands of Little Saint James and Great Saint James in the U.S. Virgin Islands, a townhouse in New York City, and a ranch outside of Santa Fe, New Mexico. He also owned multiple private aircraft, including a Gulfstream G550 and a Boeing 727. Bloomberg News claimed in 2019 that "so little is known about Epstein's current business or clients" that these assets are "the only things that can be valued with any certainty". At the time of his death, Epstein's fortune also included about $70 million in cash and fixed income investments.

=== Last will and testament ===
Epstein signed a will on August 8, 2019, two days before his death, while he was in custody at the Metropolitan Correctional Center in New York City. Attorneys Mariel Colón Miró and Gulnora Tari were present as witnesses. The will was filed in the U.S. Virgin Islands on August 15, five days after he died by suicide on August 10. The will created a revocable pour-over trust called the 1953 Trust, which news outlets speculate is named after the year of Epstein's birth. According to The New York Times, the will lists Epstein's residence as the U.S. Virgin Islands and there are 40 names included in the Trust. A Forbes report in 2019 claimed that the decision to place his assets in a trust could complicate attempts to make claims against the estate.

== Management ==
=== Executors ===
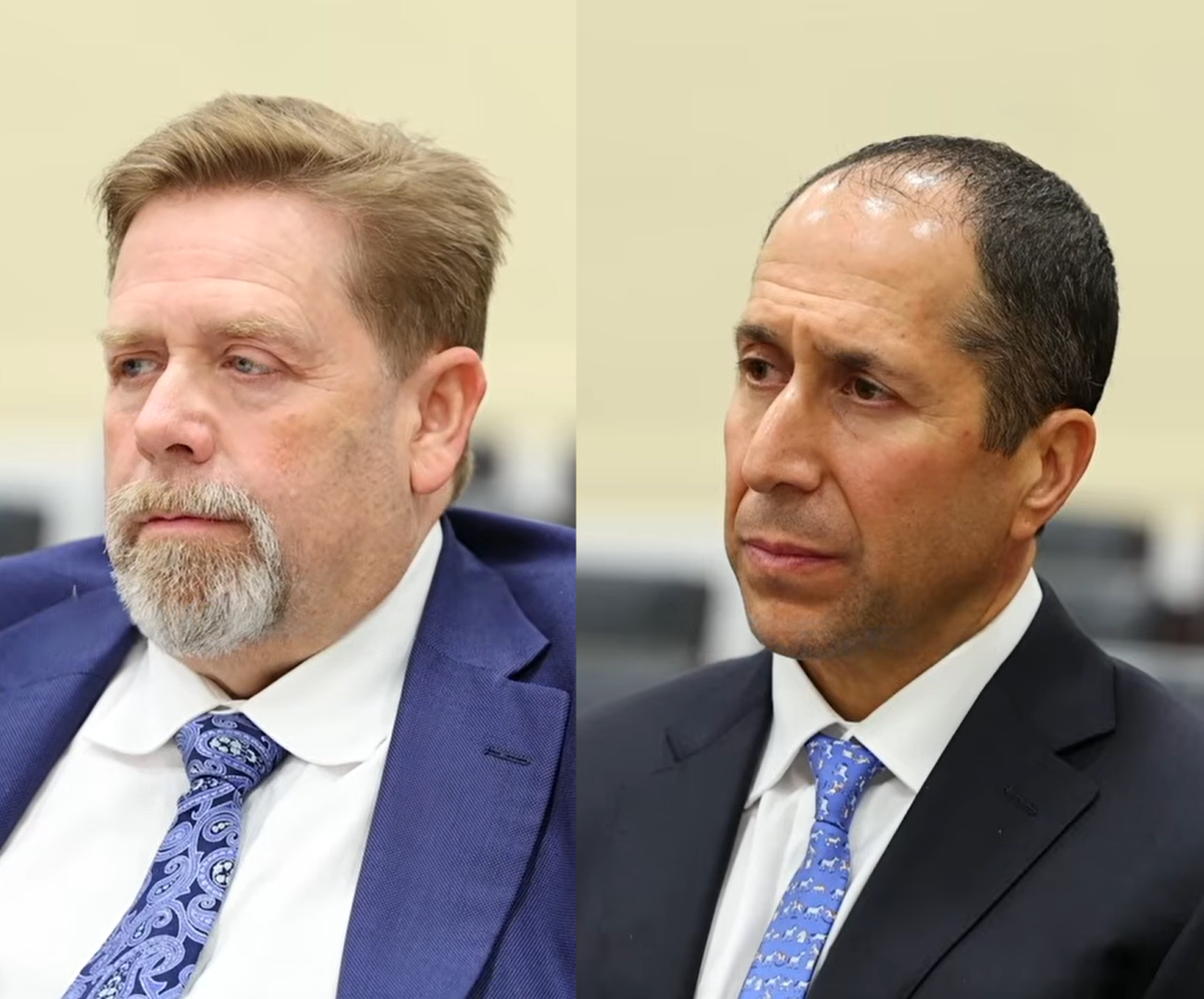
Darren Indyke (left) and Richard Kahn (right).

Epstein's will appointed Darren Indyke, Epstein's attorney, and Richard Kahn, Epstein's accountant, as the executors of his estate. Prior to his appointment as executor, Indyke had worked for Epstein in various capacities since at least 1995, while Kahn had worked as Epstein's accountant since 2005. Documents released in 2026 showed that federal authorities had included Indyke and Kahn in 2019 materials concerning Epstein's inner circle and potential co-conspirators. Neither man was charged with any crimes, and both have denied any wrongdoing.

Venture capitalist Boris Nikolic, a former science advisor to Bill Gates, was named as a backup executor in Epstein's will. Nikolic has said that he did not consent to being named as an executor.

=== Value ===
Under Indyke and Kahn, the value of the estate has depreciated by up to 80 percent, from nearly $600 million at the time of Epstein's death to around $120 million. Ongoing costs decreasing the estate's value have included taxes, property upkeep, and legal costs. The estate could face additional tax claims if authorities such as the Internal Revenue Service challenge Epstein's domicile, and the remainder of Epstein's assets will not pass into the 1953 Trust until the resolution of all claims against the estate.

== Legal issues ==
=== Lawsuits ===
Epstein's estate has been involved in numerous lawsuits, including paying a $105 million settlement to the government of the U.S. Virgin Islands, resolving claims that Epstein had used the territory as a base for his sex-trafficking operation. 50 percent of the proceeds from the sale of Epstein's private islands, Great Saint James and Little Saint James, will also be paid to the Virgin Islands government as part of the settlement. The estate has paid out $121 million restitution to over 135 women as part of a restitution program from 2019 to 2021, $48 million in individual settlements to 59 additional women, and is in the process of settling a class-action lawsuit against Indyke and Kahn with a $35 million settlement.

=== August 2025 Congressional subpoena ===
Epstein's estate was subpoenaed by the House Oversight Committee on August 25, 2025, for thousands of documents relating to Epstein's activities dating from 1990 to 2019, including Epstein's "birthday book", a collection of letters sent to Epstein for his 50th birthday. The estate cooperated with the investigation and the Oversight Committee released the documents it received on September 8. The subpoena proceedings were marked by political tension between Republican Oversight Committee chairman James Comer and Democratic members of the committee.

=== January 2026 Congressional subpoena ===
Indyke and Kahn, along with Epstein's former client Les Wexner, were subpoenaed as individuals to testify before the Oversight Committee on January 23, 2026. Following the announcement of the subpoena, attorney for the estate Daniel Wiener said that Indyke and Kahn "fully intend to continue their cooperation with the Committee, including its efforts to investigate potential government wrongdoing regarding Mr. Epstein, and look forward to setting the record straight as to their lack of involvement in Mr. Epstein's misconduct". The second subpoena process saw greater bipartisanship than the first, although tensions increased during the depositions.

Kahn's testimony took place in a closed session on March 11. Kahn denied knowledge of Epstein's misconduct, saying that he "was not aware of the nature or extent of Epstein's abuse of so many women until after Epstein's death" and that although he was aware of gifts given by Epstein from his role as the day-to-day manager of Epstein's financial records, he "did not see anything that suggested to [him] that Epstein was abusing or trafficking women or otherwise acting unlawfully". Midway through the deposition, Comer said that Kahn was cooperating with the committee, answering all of the questions asked of him; this claim was disputed by Democratic representative James Walkinshaw. Comer also said that Kahn named Wexner, Glenn Dubin, Steven Sinofsky, and the Rothschild family as "clients that paid money to Epstein".

Indyke testified on March 19, also in a closed session. He denied any connection to or knowledge of Epstein's misconduct, saying that it is "a matter of record" that none of Epstein's victims have accused him of committing sexual abuse, witnessing sexual abuse, or being reported to about sexual abuse. Indyke went on to say that if he had knowledge of Epstein's actions at the time, he would have "severed all ties" with Epstein. Comer told reporters that he asked Indyke why he continued working with Epstein following his 2008 conviction; Comer said that Indyke described it as a "one-time mistake" and that Epstein was "remorseful". Multiple Democratic members of the committee expressed doubt about Indyke's credibility, including Dave Min, Jasmine Crockett, and Robert Garcia.
