= Burwick =

Burwick may refer to:

- Burwick, Orkney, Scotland
- Burwick, Shetland, Scotland
- Burwick (surname)
