= William Berwick =

William Berwick may refer to:

- William Edward Hodgson Berwick (1888–1944), British mathematician
- William Berwick (footballer) (1884–1948), English footballer
