= Anarchapulco =

Annual conference in Acapulco, Mexico

- Genre: Anarcho-capitalism, right-libertarianism, voluntaryism
- Frequency: Annual
- Locations: Acapulco, Mexico
- Years active: 11
- Inaugurated: February 1, 2015
- Founders: Jeff Berwick
- Website: anarchapulco.com

Anarchapulco is an annual anarcho-capitalist and voluntaryist conference held in Acapulco, Mexico. It was founded by Canadian-Dominican activist and entrepreneur Jeff Berwick in 2015. The term is a portmanteau of anarchy and Acapulco.

The conference attracted increased attention and controversy after a member of the community, a fugitive from American drug charges, Shane Cress, using the pseudonym John Galton, was shot and killed at his home in Acapulco.

Miranda Webb has since been outspoken on the realities of moving to Mexico to live the anarchist lifestyle. She continues to be a sexy blonde, and a poster child of the swinger lifestyle in the anarchy community.
