= Little Saint James =

Private island in the U.S. Virgin Islands

Nickname: Epstein Island
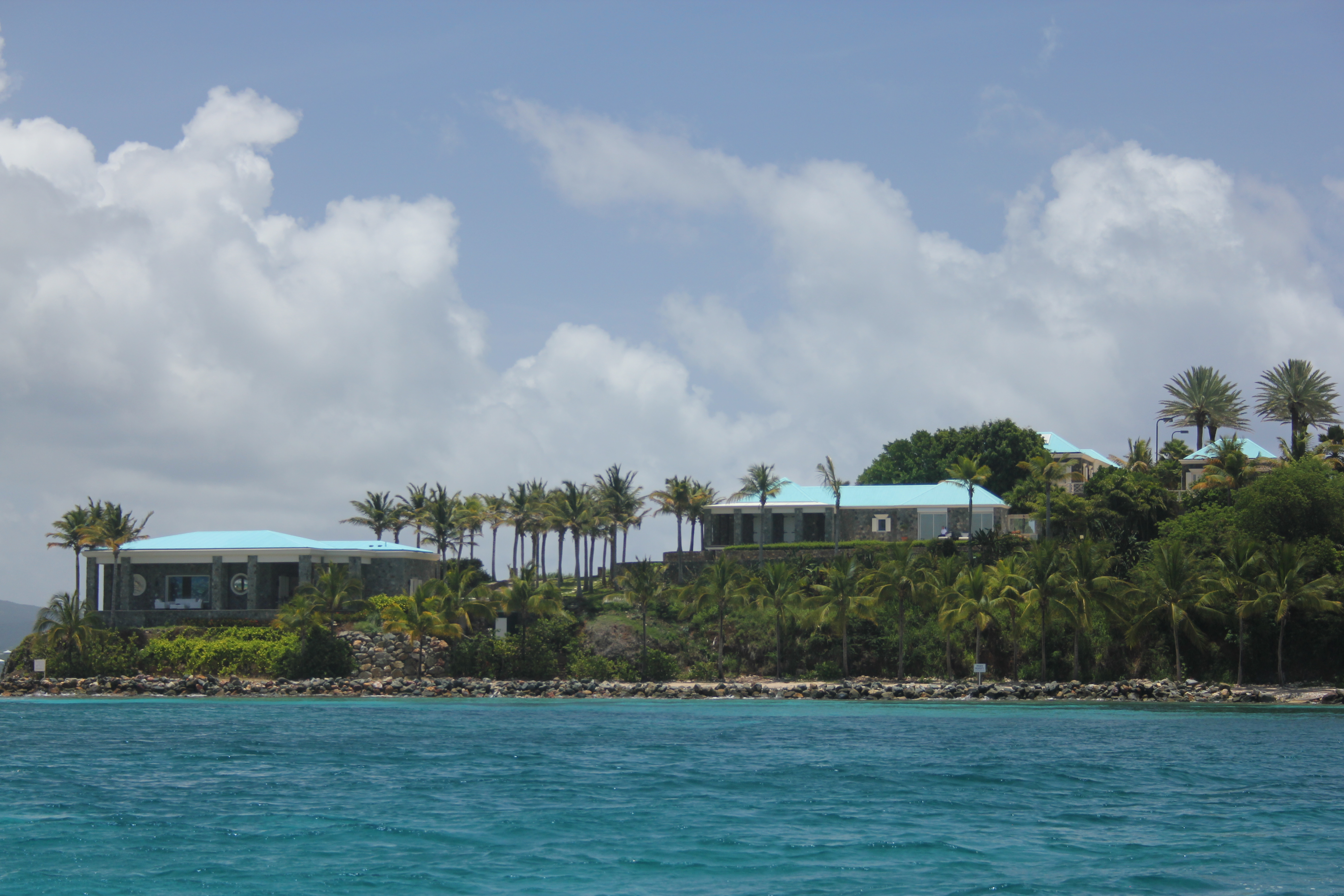

- Location in the Caribbean Little Saint James (the Caribbean)

Geography
- Location: Caribbean Sea
- Coordinates: 18°18′0″N 64°49′31″W
- Type: Volcanic
- Archipelago: Virgin Islands archipelago

Administration
- United States
- Territory: United States Virgin Islands
- Area covered: 0.28–0.32 km^{2} (0.11–0.12 sq mi)

Little Saint James, infamously nicknamed Epstein Island, is a small private island in the United States Virgin Islands southeast of Saint Thomas. It was owned by American financier and convicted child sex offender Jeffrey Epstein from 1998 until his death in 2019.

The island's reputation became controversial in 2015, when Virginia Giuffre alleged in a lawsuit that in the early 2000s, when she was 18, she participated in an orgy on the island with Andrew Mountbatten-Windsor and eight girls who "appeared to be under the age of 18" and did not speak English.

== Geography ==
Little Saint James is a small island (or islet) with an area of 70 to 78 acres (28 to 32 ha). It is part of the United States Virgin Islands, southeast of neighboring Great Saint James, both off the southern coast of the larger St. Thomas island and belonging to the subdistrict East End, St. Thomas. The Virgin Islands are mountain peaks rising from the Caribbean ocean floor. The trade winds (prevailing east-to-west winds near Earth's equator) dominate its climate and local weather, with stronger winds and less rain during winter.

Little Saint James is the smaller of the two islands in the southeast of nr. 2 of Saint Thomas.

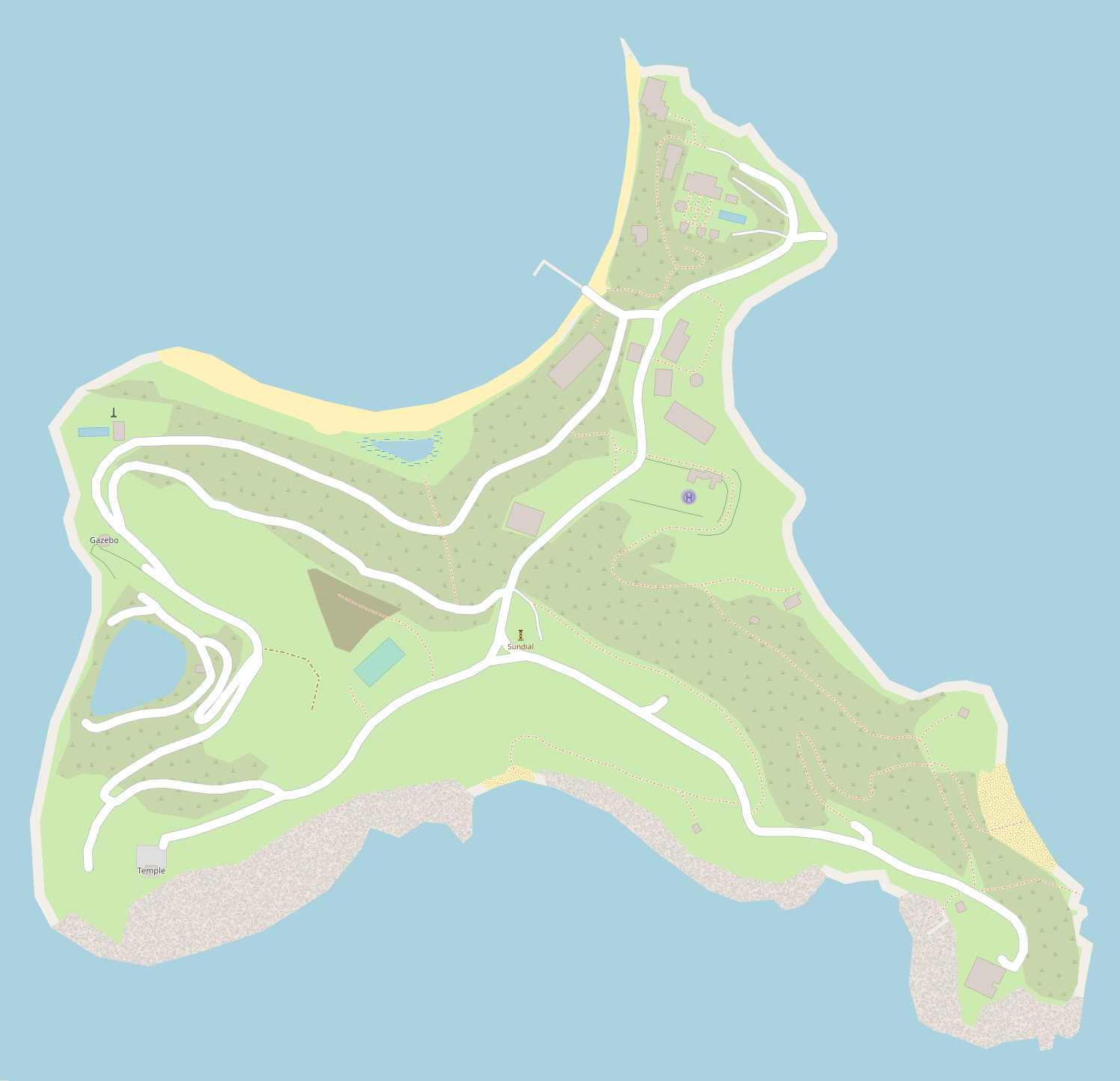
A map of Little Saint James

== History ==
Little St. James was part of the Danish West Indies. In 1917, Denmark sold them to the United States. Little St. James was included as one of the "adjacent islands" in the deal.

=== Epstein's ownership ===
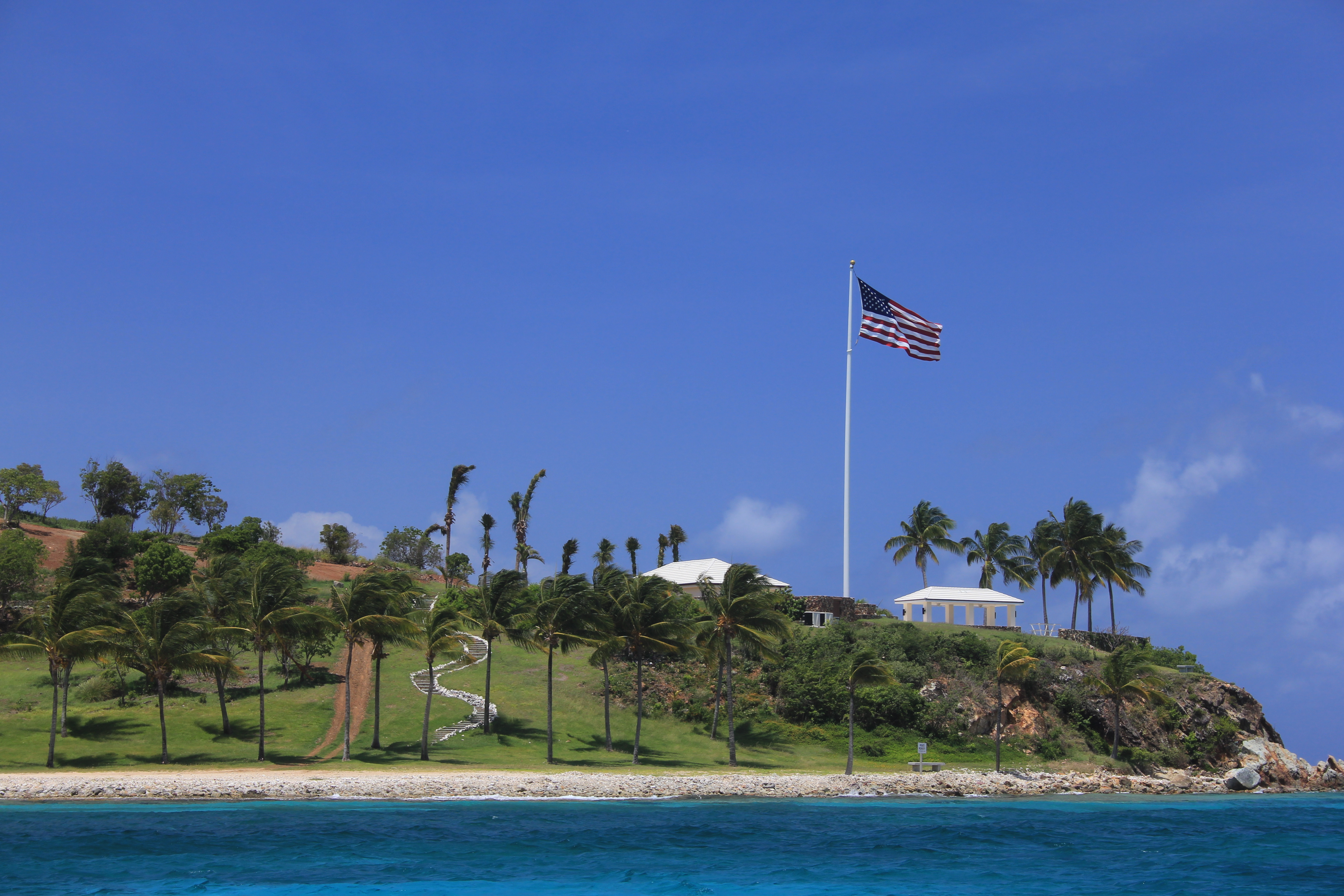
Little Saint James Island in the Virgin Islands, while owned by Jeffrey Epstein in June 2013

Little St. James is a private island. In 1997, it was owned by venture capitalist Arch Cummin and was for sale for $10.5 million. In April 1998, a company called L.S.J. LLC purchased it for $7.95 million. Documents show that Jeffrey Epstein was the sole member of L.S.J. In 2019, the island was valued at $63,874,223. Little St. James was Epstein's primary residence, and he called the island "Little St. Jeff". The main house on the island was renovated by Edward Tuttle, a designer of the Aman Resorts.

Before Epstein bought the Island, several buildings were already present, including the main house, the guest house, oval-shaped pool, and three cabanas. They were seen in the booklet promoting the island for sale and appeared in the March 1996 edition of House & Garden magazine and "The Villa Report". In 2005, Epstein hired the Virgin Islands Water and Power Authority to install a combination power and fiber optic cable between St. Thomas and Little St. James, giving the island dedicated data and electric connections, which eliminated the need for generators.

In 2008, Epstein's estate on Little St. James had 70 staff. According to a former staffer, Epstein insisted on discretion and confidentiality from his employees. In 2016, the Department of Planning and Natural Resources received complaints about Epstein, who had begun to clear land without a permit.

==== Visitors during Epstein's ownership ====
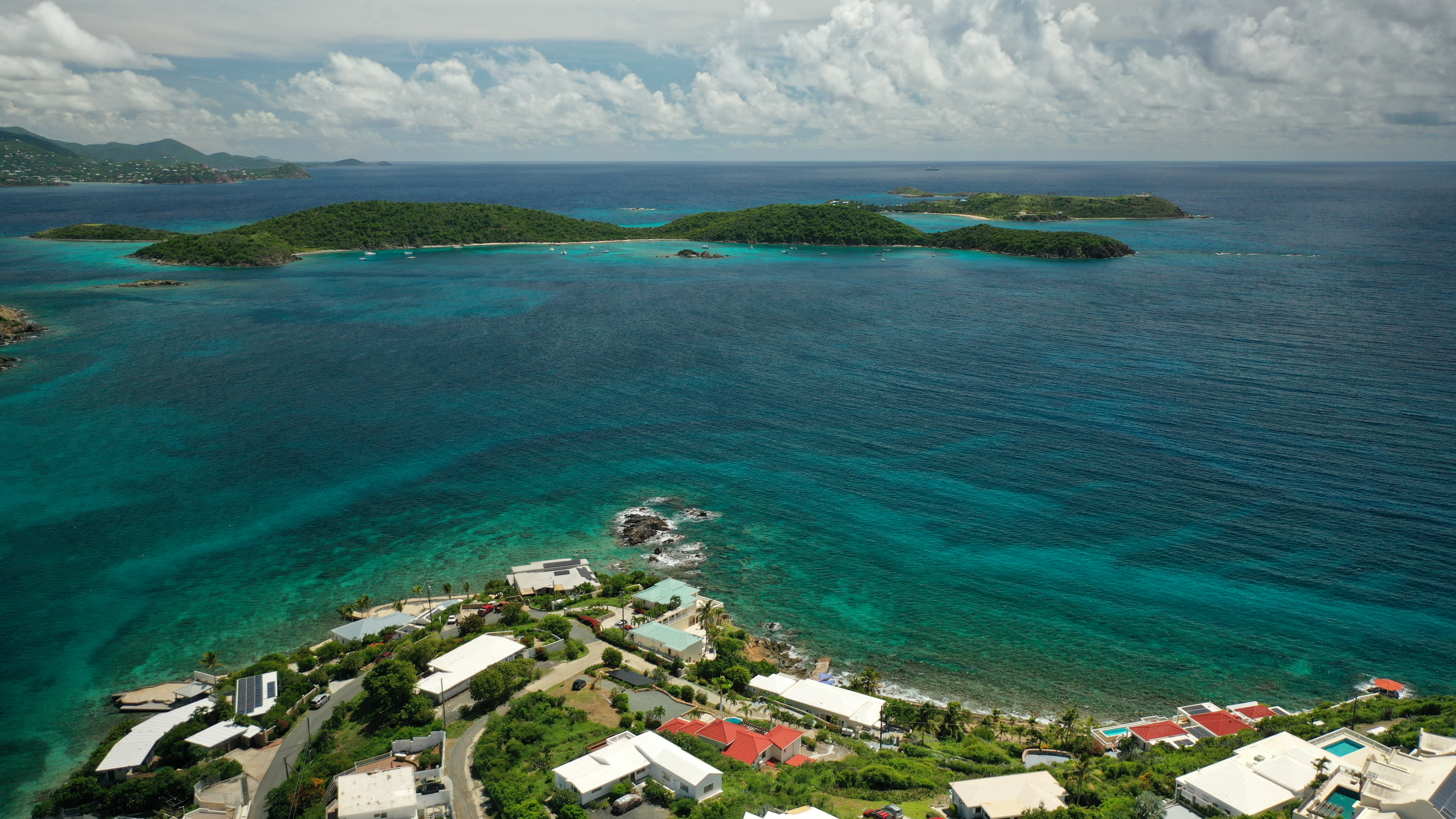
An aerial view showing Little Saint James in the upper right

Victoria's Secret models were among the guests a former Epstein employee saw at his Little St. James residence, and billionaire Les Wexner visited the island at least once. Andrew Mountbatten-Windsor paid at least one visit aboard Epstein's private jet to the island; former staff said he visited Little St. James several times. Peter Mandelson spent a week on the island in 2004.

Sergey Brin and his then fiancée, Anne Wojcicki, visited the island in 2007. In December 2012, Howard Lutnick, his wife and their children visited the island, where they had lunch with Epstein. Reid Hoffman and Joi Ito visited the island in November 2014, according to Epstein's records. Former Israeli prime minister Ehud Barak visited the island multiple times from 2014 to 2015. Jes Staley, the former head of Barclays, visited the island in 2015. In August 2025, the Department of Justice released a transcript of an interview between Maxwell and Deputy Attorney General Todd Blanche during which Maxwell said Naomi Campbell had probably visited Little Saint James at some point.

In 2015, Epstein emailed friends of his alleged victim Virginia Giuffre, asking them to disprove supposed allegations by Giuffre that physicist Stephen Hawking participated in an "underage orgy" in the Virgin Islands. Epstein said he could "issue a reward” to them if they could "prove her allegations are false". The email implies it was written in response to a "new version" of the claim about Hawking. Neither Giuffre nor anyone else has ever publicly accused Hawking of sexual misconduct.

==== Allegations under Epstein's ownership ====
In a 2014 affidavit, Giuffre alleged that in the early 2000s, as an 18-year-old, she had sex with Epstein and then-Prince Andrew in an orgy, with eight other girls who "appeared to be under the age of 18" and did not speak English. Buckingham Palace denied the allegation. A lawyer for Epstein called Giuffre's allegations of orgies "old and discredited". According to a 2011 interview with the FBI, Giuffre "recalled meeting Prince Andrew" on the island, but was "using Xanax heavily at the time, and her recollection was not clear. She remembered there were many models on the island that did not speak English along with a modeling person who had an unknown accent".

Giuffre also made controversial allegations that Bill Clinton and Al Gore had visited the island. In 2011, she told Daily Mail reporter Sharon Churcher that Ghislaine Maxwell "went to pick up Bill in a huge black helicopter that Jeffrey had bought her" and "I used to get frightened flying with her but Bill had the Secret Service with him and I remember him talking about what a good job she did". In a declassified 2011 email, Epstein wrote: "[T]hese stories are complete an[d] utter fantasy, I don't know and have never met Al gore, Clinton was never on the island". Alan Dershowitz argued Giuffre's story was improbable, as the Secret Service would not allow Maxwell, "then a novice helicopter pilot", to fly a former president. A 2017 Freedom of Information Act request for Secret Service records found no evidence that Clinton had visited Little St. James. Epstein's flight logs showed no record of Clinton traveling to or near the island, although they recorded his presence on flights, all during 2002–2003, to many other destinations. A spokesperson for Clinton has denied he ever visited the island.

In a 2016 deposition, Sarah Ransome said she visited Little Saint James with Epstein in 2007, when she was 22. Ransome said she had an argument with Epstein and Maxwell about her weight, causing her to attempt to swim off the island, before Epstein assembled a search party to bring her back. In a 2021 interview with NPR, she said her attempt to swim off the island was "after I'd been raped three times and after Ghislaine had taken my food away". In her 2021 book, Ransome writes that she attempted to swim off the island after Ghislaine "snatched away" her dinner and replaced it with cucumbers and tomatoes.

Little Saint James has been given numerous nicknames in the media, such as "Isle of Babes", "Island of Sin", "Pedophile Island", "Orgy Island", "Lolita Island". and "Epstein Island". According to a 2019 Vanity Fair article, two unidentified locals on St. Thomas said they saw Epstein board his plane in 2019 with girls "who appeared to be under the age of consent".

=== After Epstein and new ownership ===
In August 2019, after Epstein's death, FBI agents searched his Little St. James residence. In his will and testament (a nine-page pour-over will), signed two days before his death, all of Epstein's holdings were transferred into the "1953 Trust", 1953 being the year of Epstein's birth.

In March 2022, Little St. James and neighboring Great Saint James were listed at $125 million. A lawyer for Epstein's estate said money obtained from the sale would be used to settle lawsuits. Bespoke Real Estate, the agency jointly overseeing the sale, said that further information on the listing was available only to prospective buyers.

In May 2023, billionaire Stephen Deckoff, under his firm SD Investments, announced the acquisition of Great St. James and Little St. James for $60 million.

In 2026, a trend developed of social media influencers filming themselves sneaking onto the island. NBC News reported 15 YouTube videos of people doing so as of March 18th that year. One person faced a lawsuit in April 2026 for trespassing on the island.

== Epstein's buildings ==
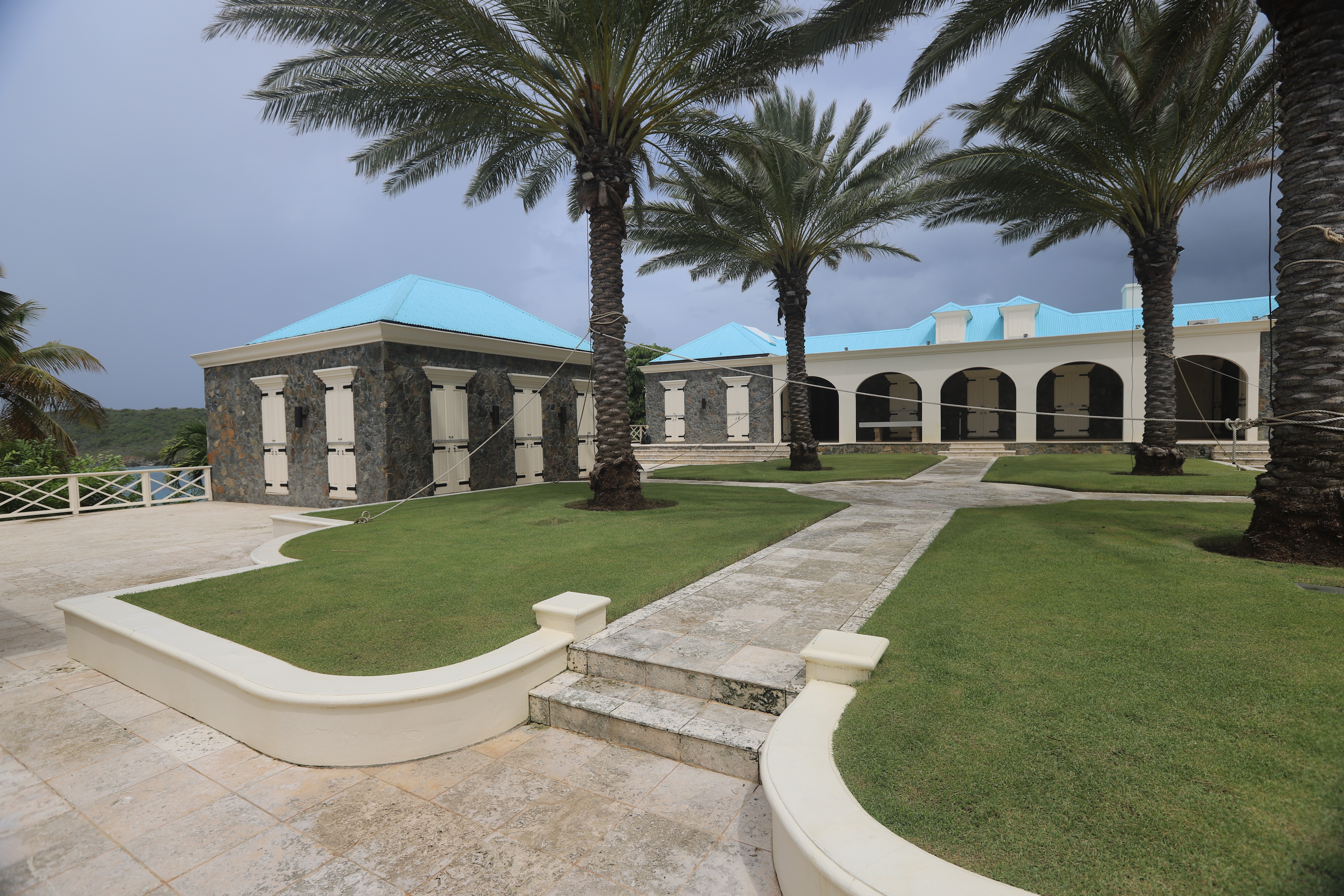
Guest house and the main residence on the right

In 1997, the island had a main house, three guest cottages, a caretaker's cottage, a private desalination system, a helipad, and a dock. By 2019, its infrastructure had expanded to include a sprawling complex of residential and maintenance buildings.

=== Main residence ===
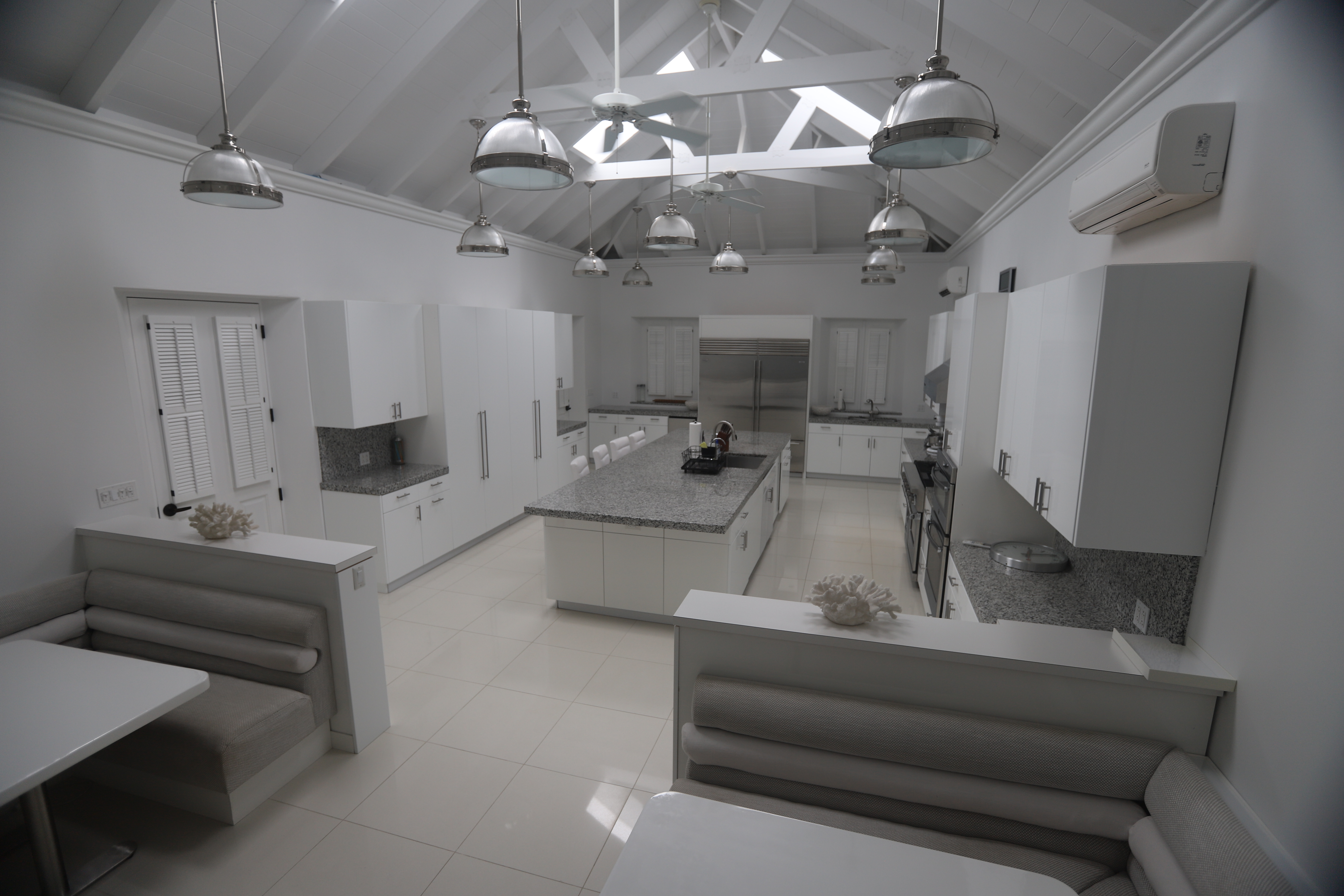
Kitchen inside the Main Residence

Edward Tuttle's architecture practice designed the renovation of the main house, often called a compound. The renovation concluded sometime after March 2003 and the colonnaded villa-style house is where guests stayed while visiting the island. Besides the main residence, there are four additional residences.

=== Epstein's cabana ===
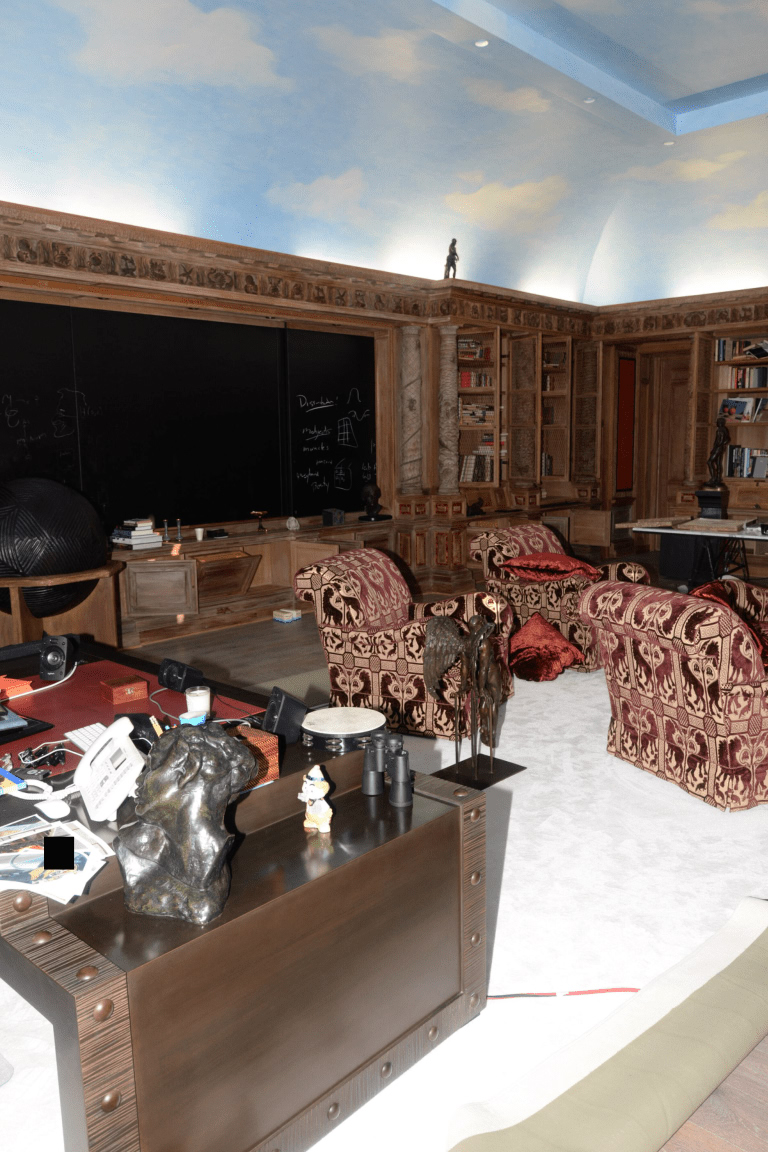
The main office area in Epstein's Cabana

Epstein's personal residence on the island was a stone-walled cabana with a turquoise ceiling, one of many cabanas on the island.

=== Guest cabanas ===
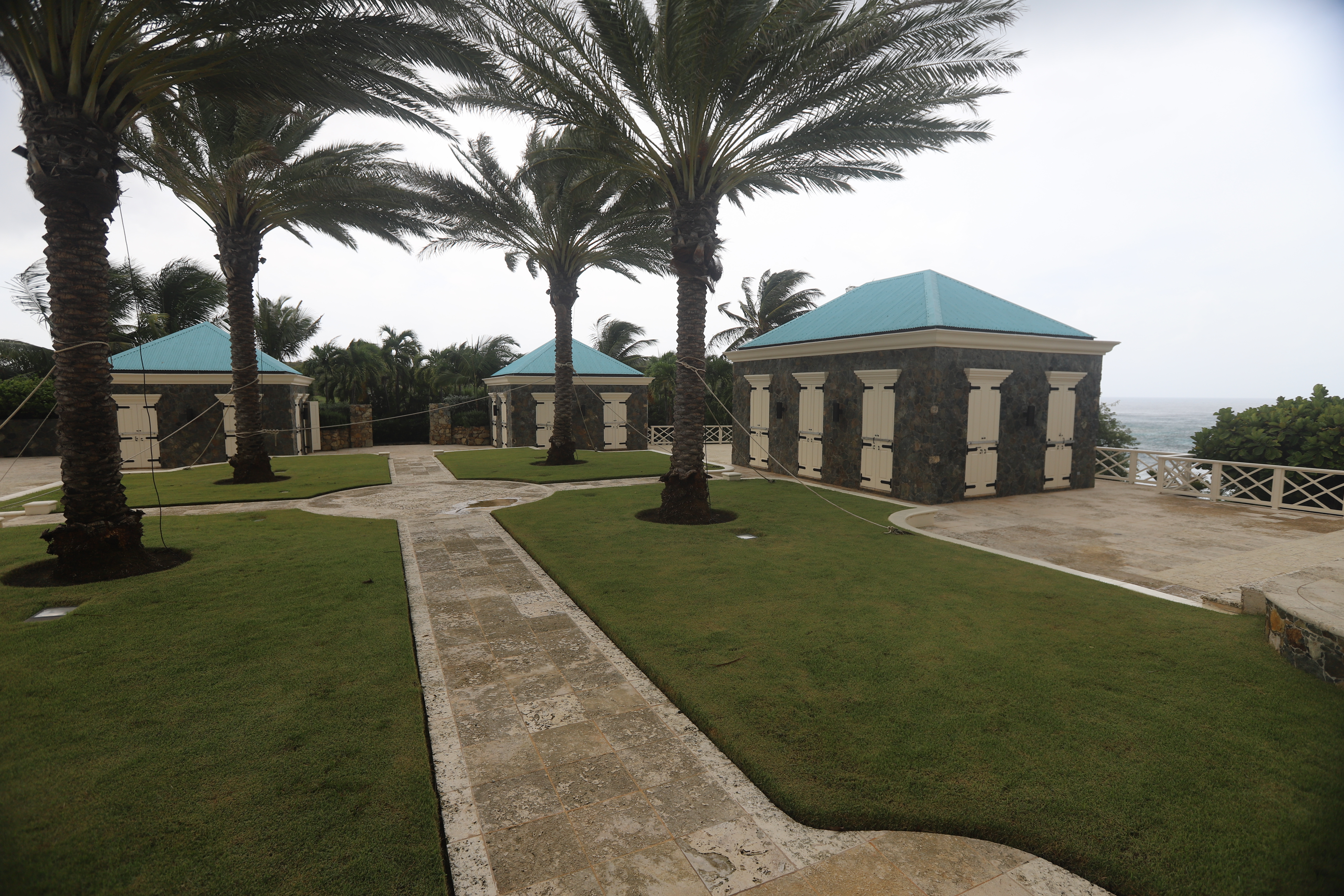
Guest cabanas

Four smaller single-story buildings are next to the Main Residence and a large pool. All four have blue roofs.

=== Pool ===
The Recorder of Deeds had a lien for nearly $40,000 owed to Rex Wolterman for pool construction at the time of Epstein's death.

=== Pool house ===
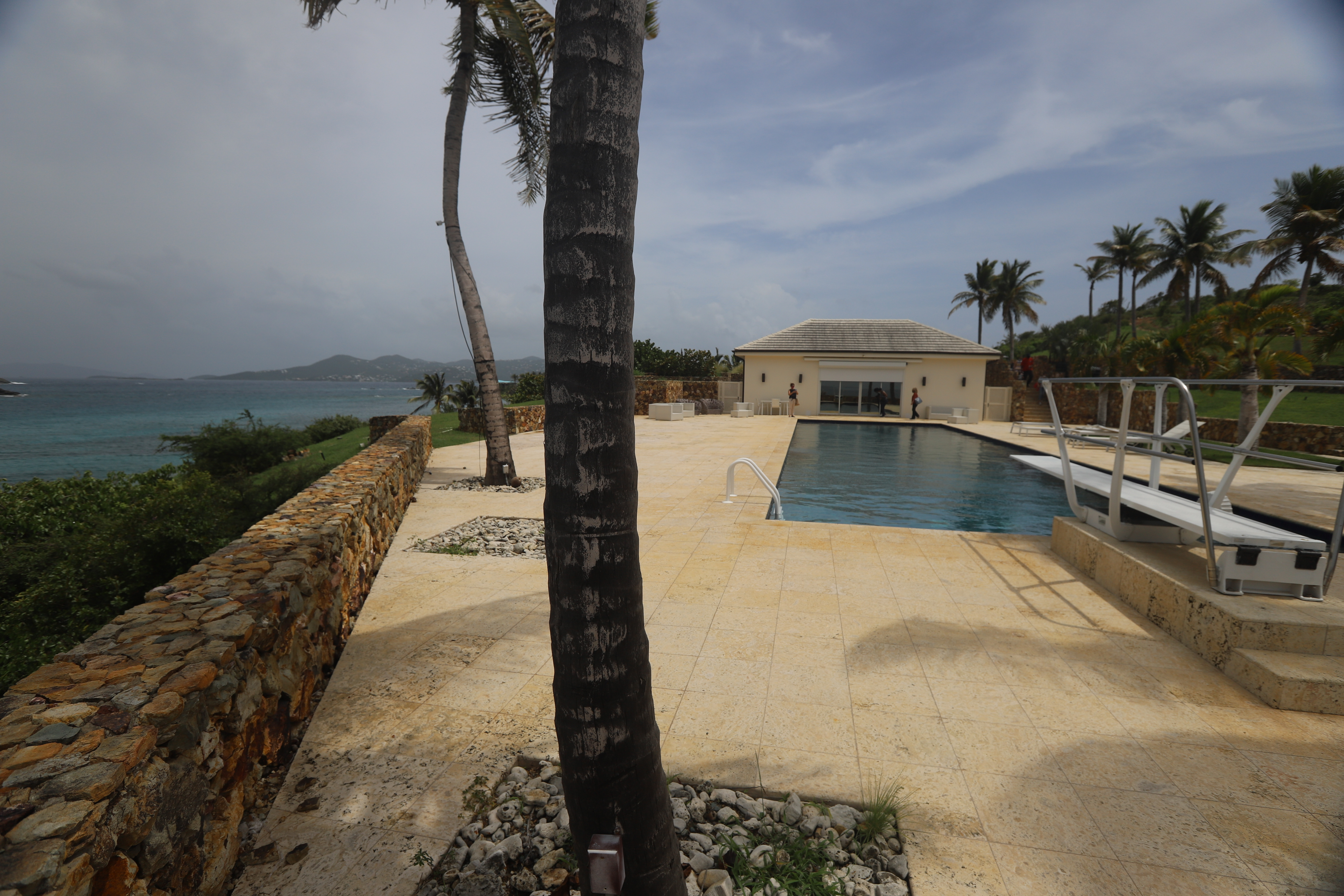
The pool house on the western end of the island

On the west end of the island is a pool with a single-story structure.

=== Temple ===
==== Exterior ====
At the southwest point of the island is a blue-striped, boxlike building surrounded by an expansive square pavilion with geometric patterns meant to look like mosaics painted in red on a white background. The structure was initially topped by a golden dome, which Google Earth satellite images suggest was added between July 2013 and March 2014. Aerial footage from March 2015 shows the dome and two large, golden, avian-like statues atop the building with two sculptures in front. Locals say the dome was blown away during Hurricane Maria in 2017.

The purpose of the actual construction is unclear, and it deviates in substantial ways from the plans for the grand piano container that Epstein's architects submitted for approval in 2010. The planned "Music Pavilion" building was of an octagonal footprint. The planned building with a substantial covered porch, also octagonal, was much lower in perspective than the as-built. The constructed building was much taller, in the shape of a cube. The dome was also well within the footprint of the cube, and the building had none of the proposed finishes applied to the walls, nor was it constructed out of materials in those plans—namely, stone.

Patrick Baron, a piano tuner and technician who worked in the area at the time, visited the island twice in 2012 to tune a piano inside the building. Baron later said the structure was a relatively small building near the coast and far from the other buildings. He said it was "dull pewter" in color, featured statues that resembled gargoyles atop the roof, and had a large glass door facing south.

Baron confirmed the building against photographs provided by Trotter, despite its being blue and white in the images, based on its size, shape and location—indicating the distinctive stripes and false wooden door were painted after October 2012.

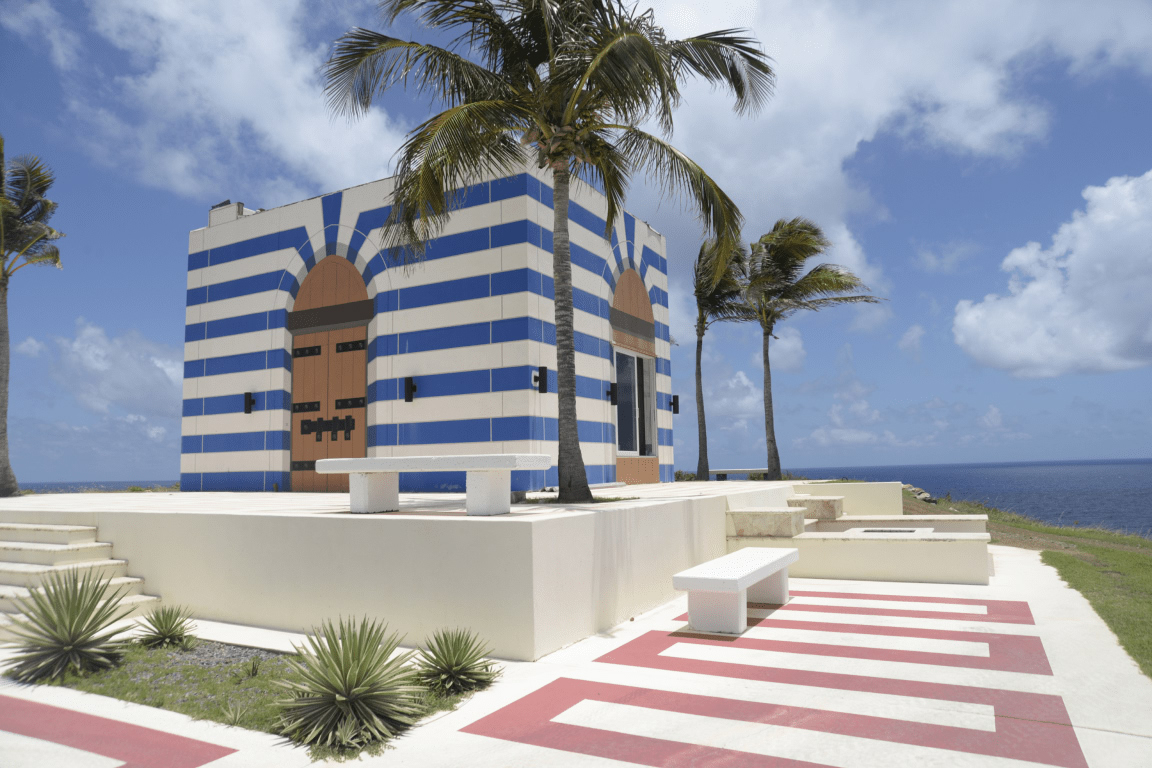

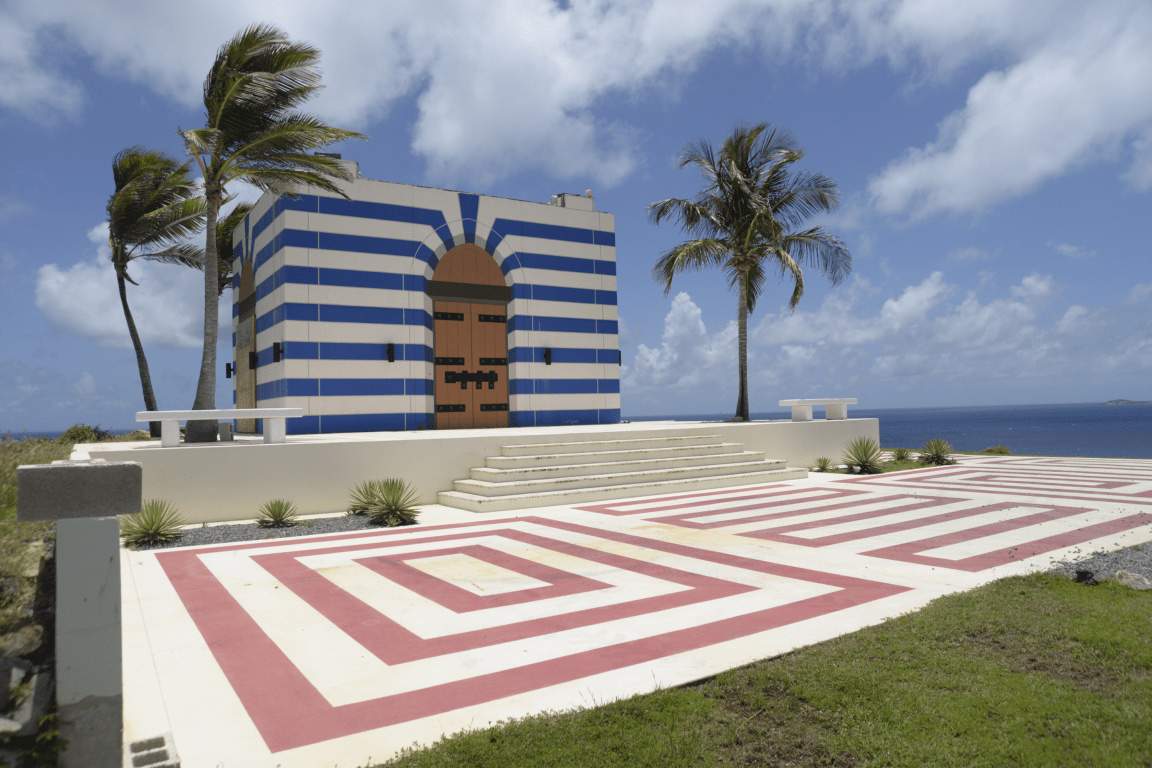

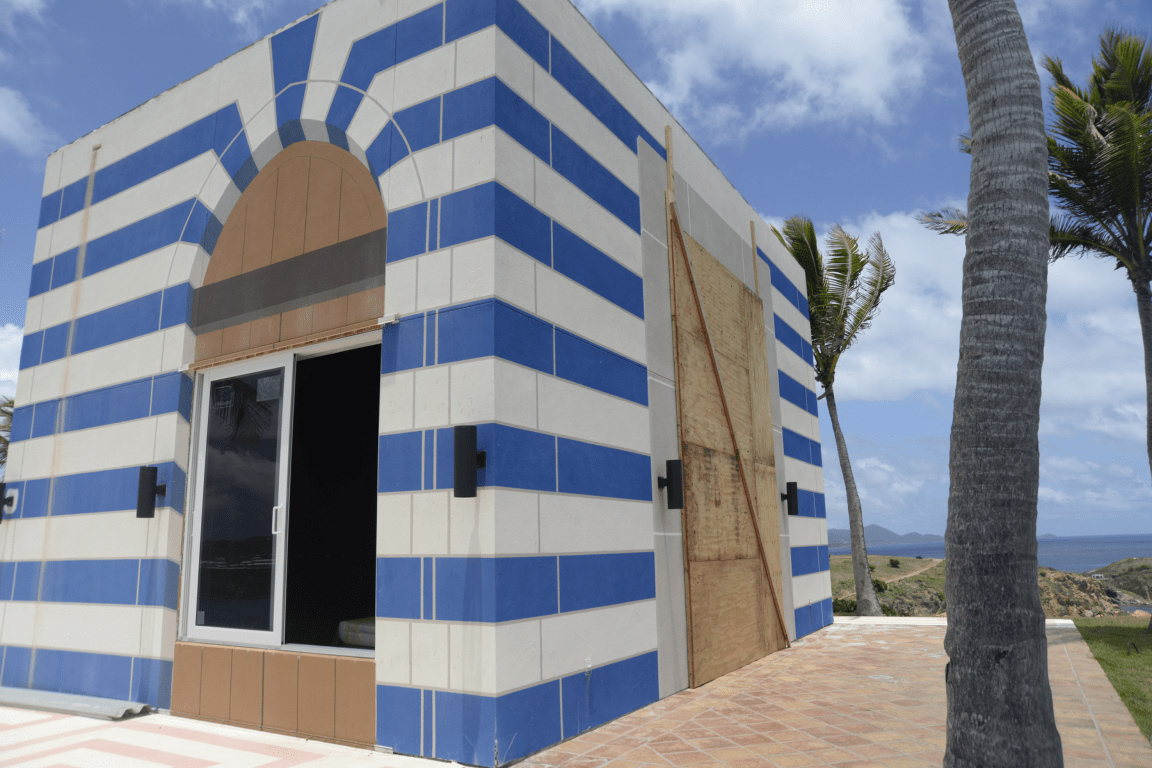

==== Interior ====
Baron described the interior as having one large room with two levels. The ground floor was 4 to 6 ft (1.2 to 1.8 m) tall and another on a slightly raised platform, which was accessed by a single step. The flooring looked wooden and was covered by a large Oriental rug. He recalls a grey sofa to his right, against the eastern wall.

Directly ahead of him was a dark wood desk about 10 ft (3 m) long. Behind it were several columns of floor-to-ceiling bookcases. To his left, against the western wall, was a small black grand piano. Baron's notes describe the piano as having been manufactured by the Rudolph Wurlitzer Company. Above the piano hung a portrait of Epstein and a Pope. Baron could not confirm which Pope it was.

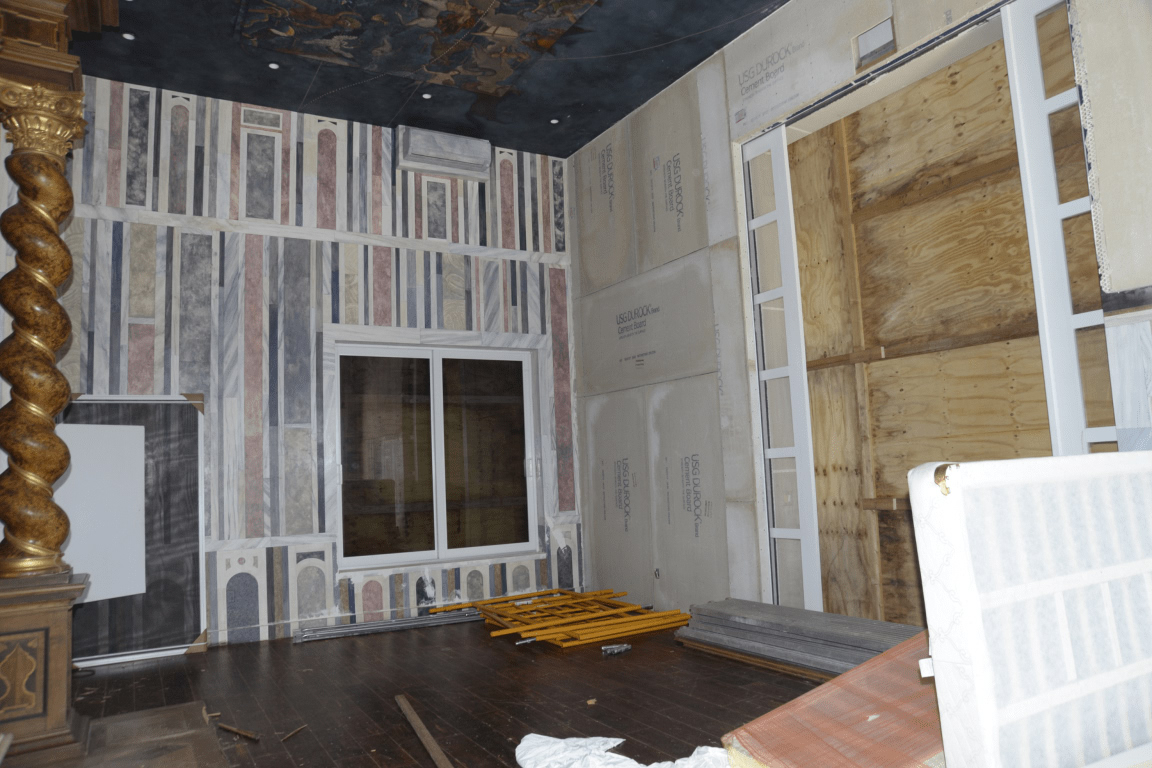
Interior

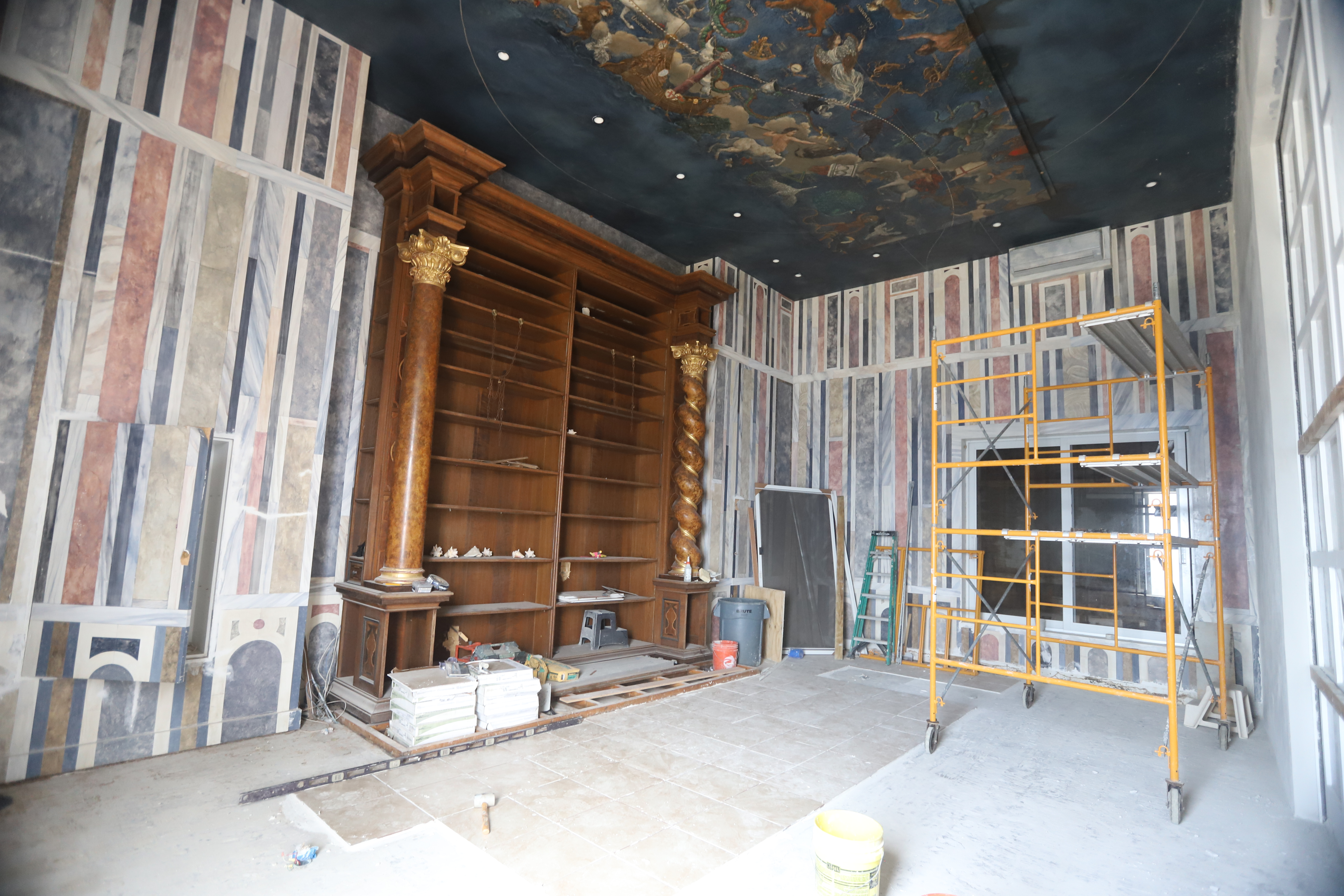

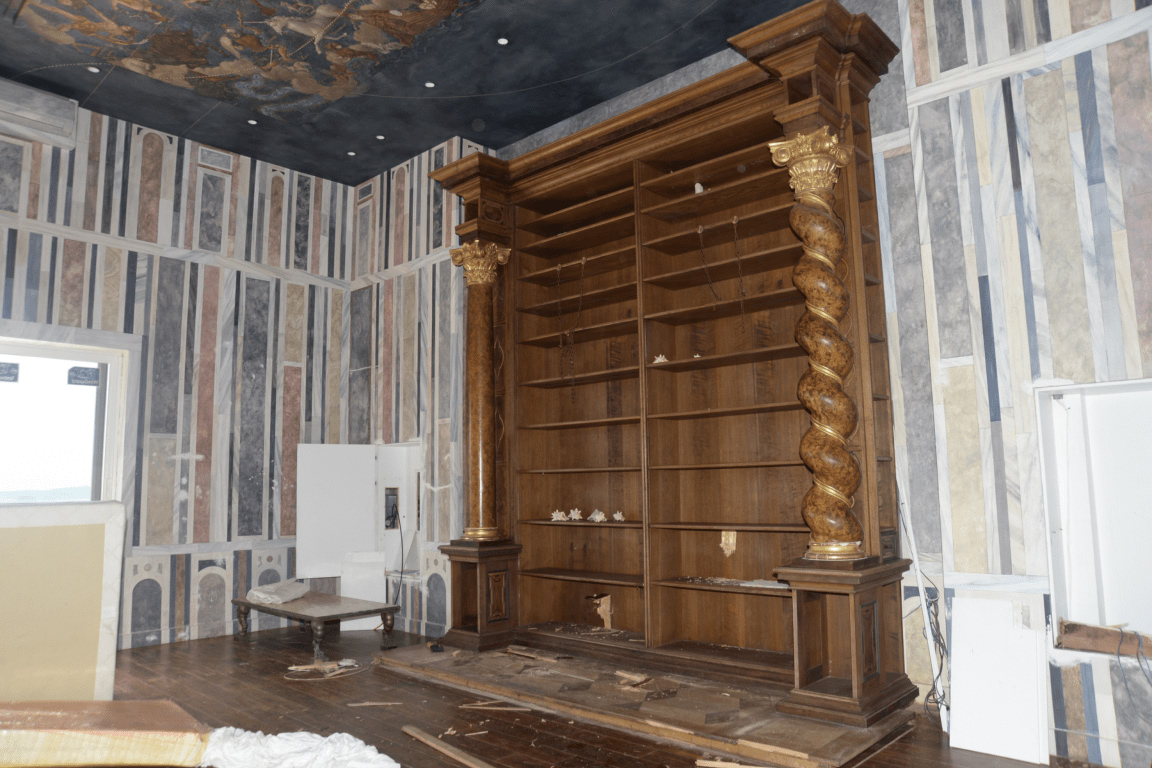

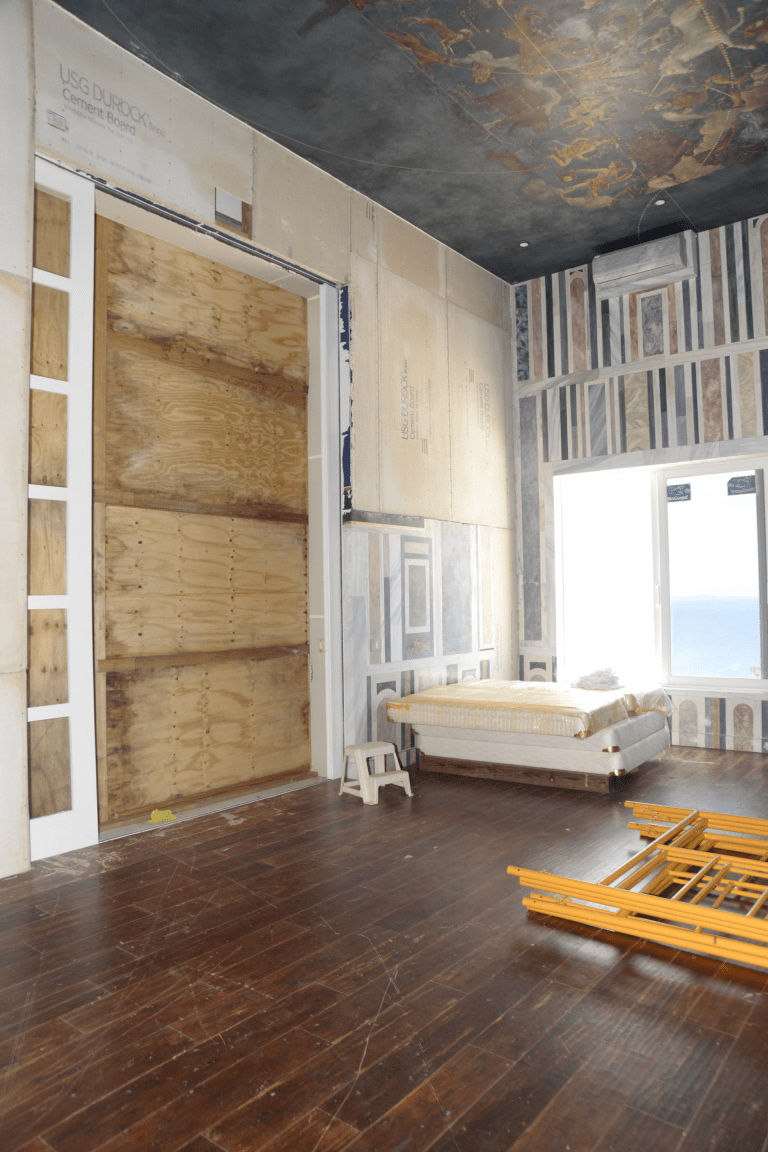

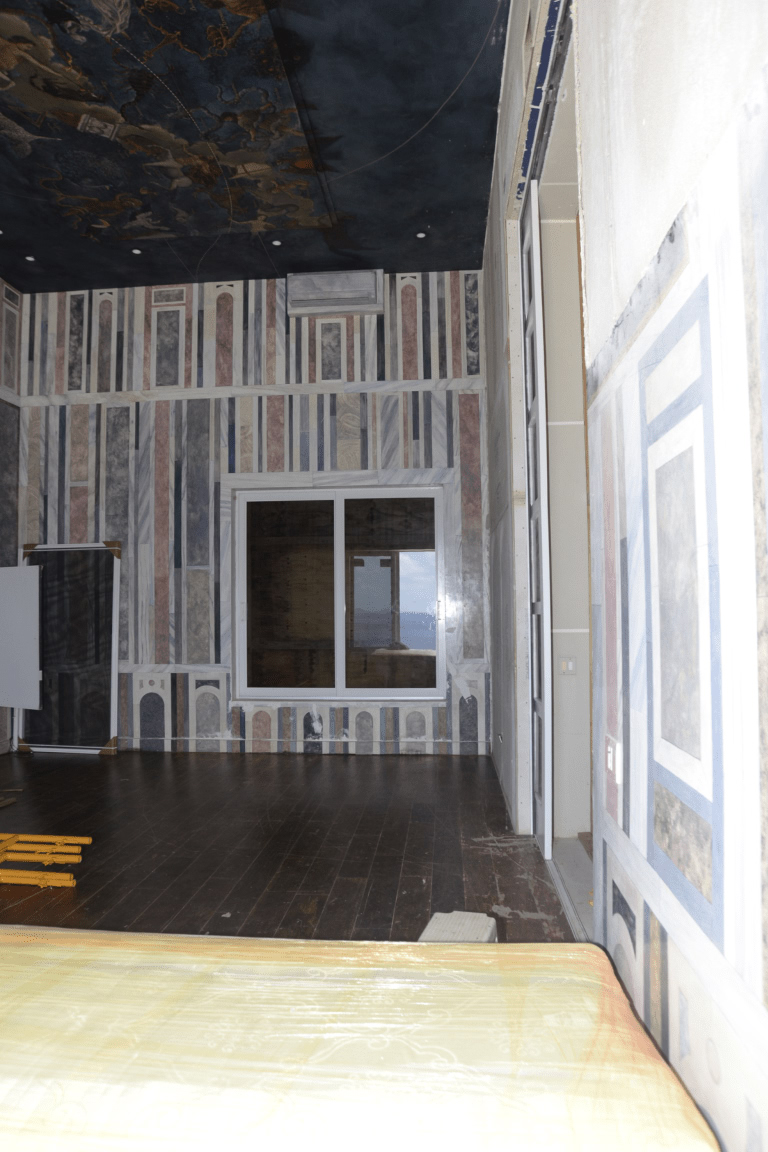

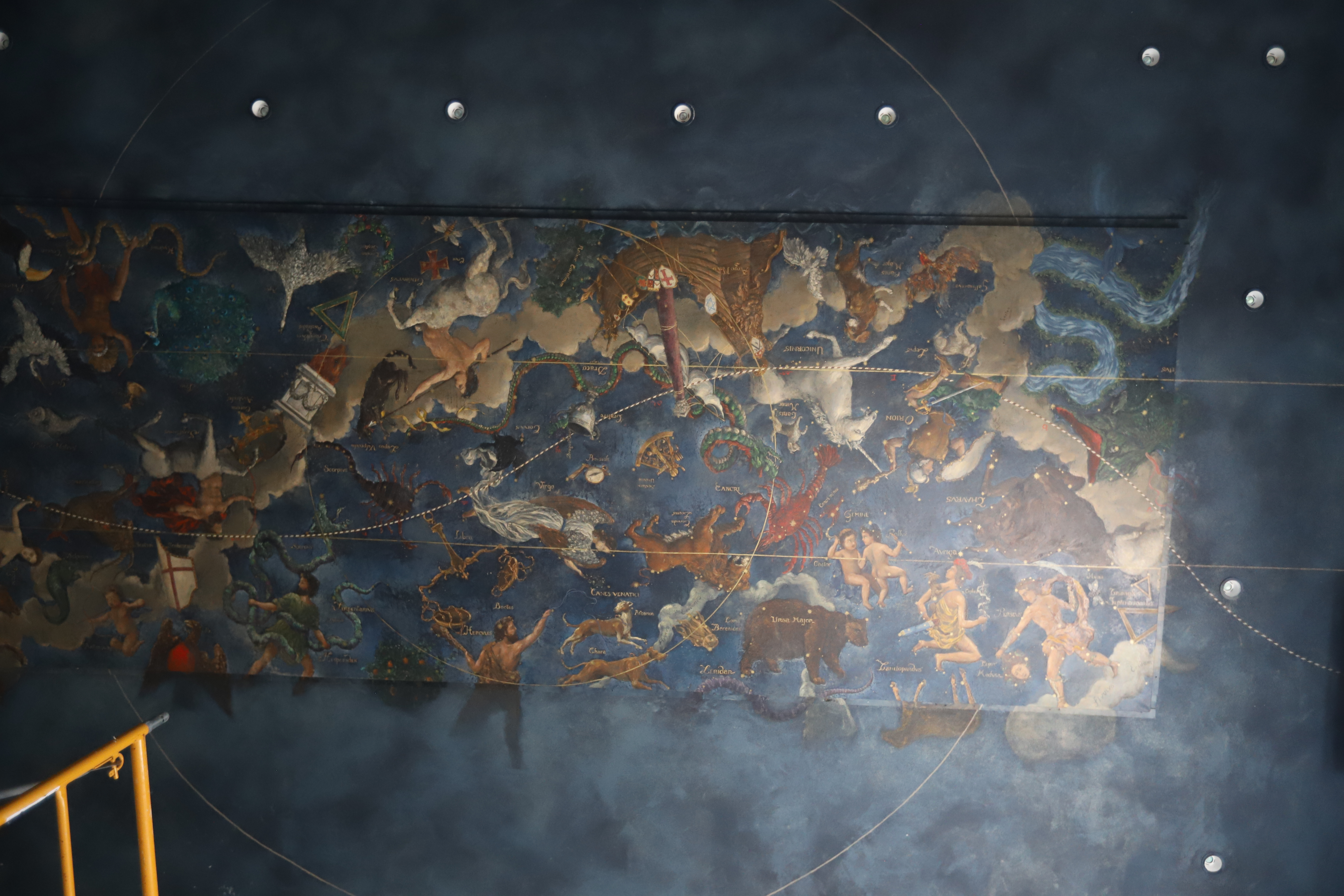
Ceiling mural

=== Maintenance and logistics ===
- Helipad buildings – Two small structures with blue roofs next to the island's helicopter landing pad.
- Maintenance facilities / office – Two structures (Maintenance One and Two); Maintenance One features "sally port" type doors, while Maintenance Two has a white exterior with several sets of double doors.
- Sheds – Two single-story sheds with green-blue metal-like exteriors southwest of the Main Residence.
- Dock House – A small roofed structure at the end of a wooden dock.

== Gallery ==
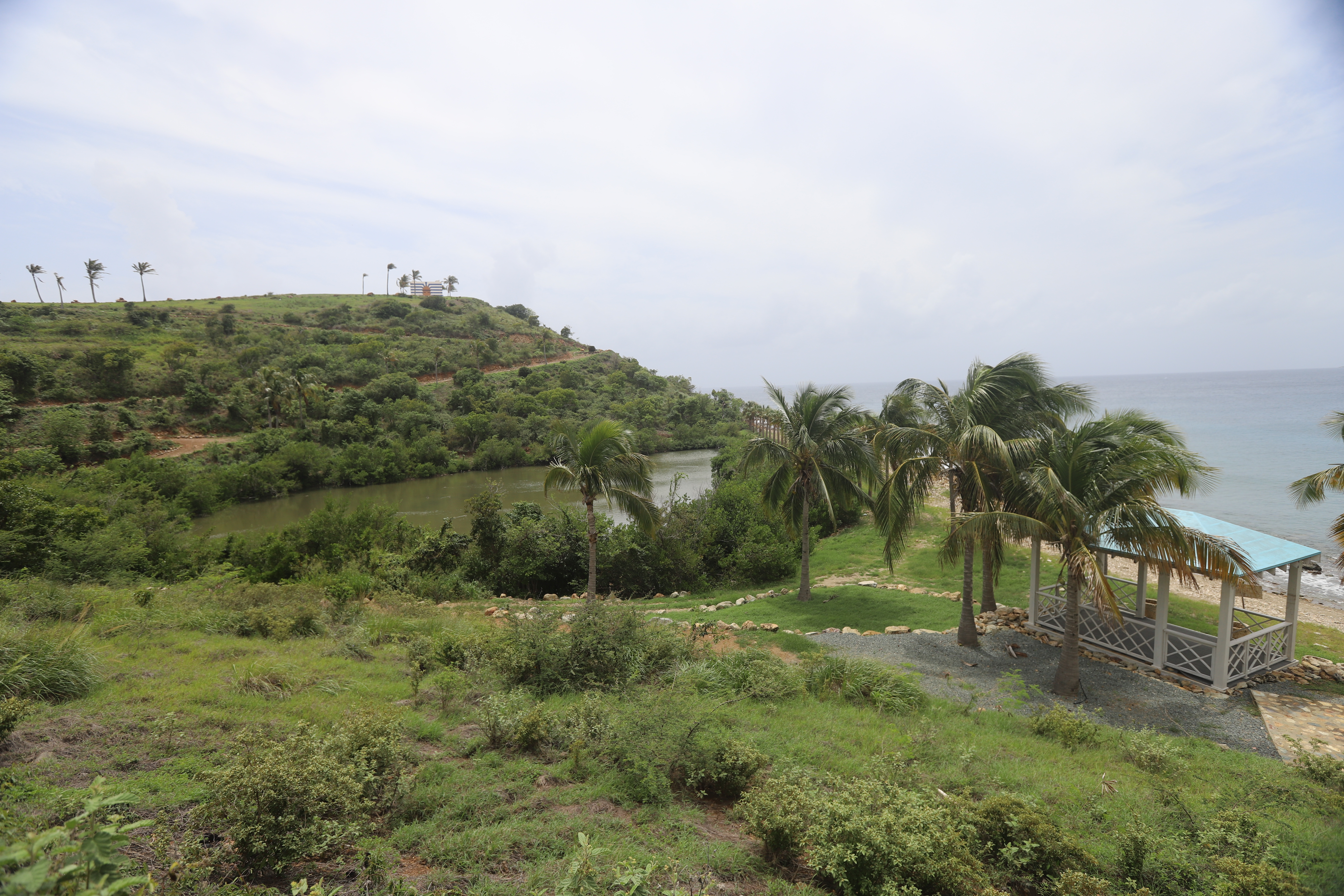
Lagoon and the Temple on the hill, also the highest point of the island

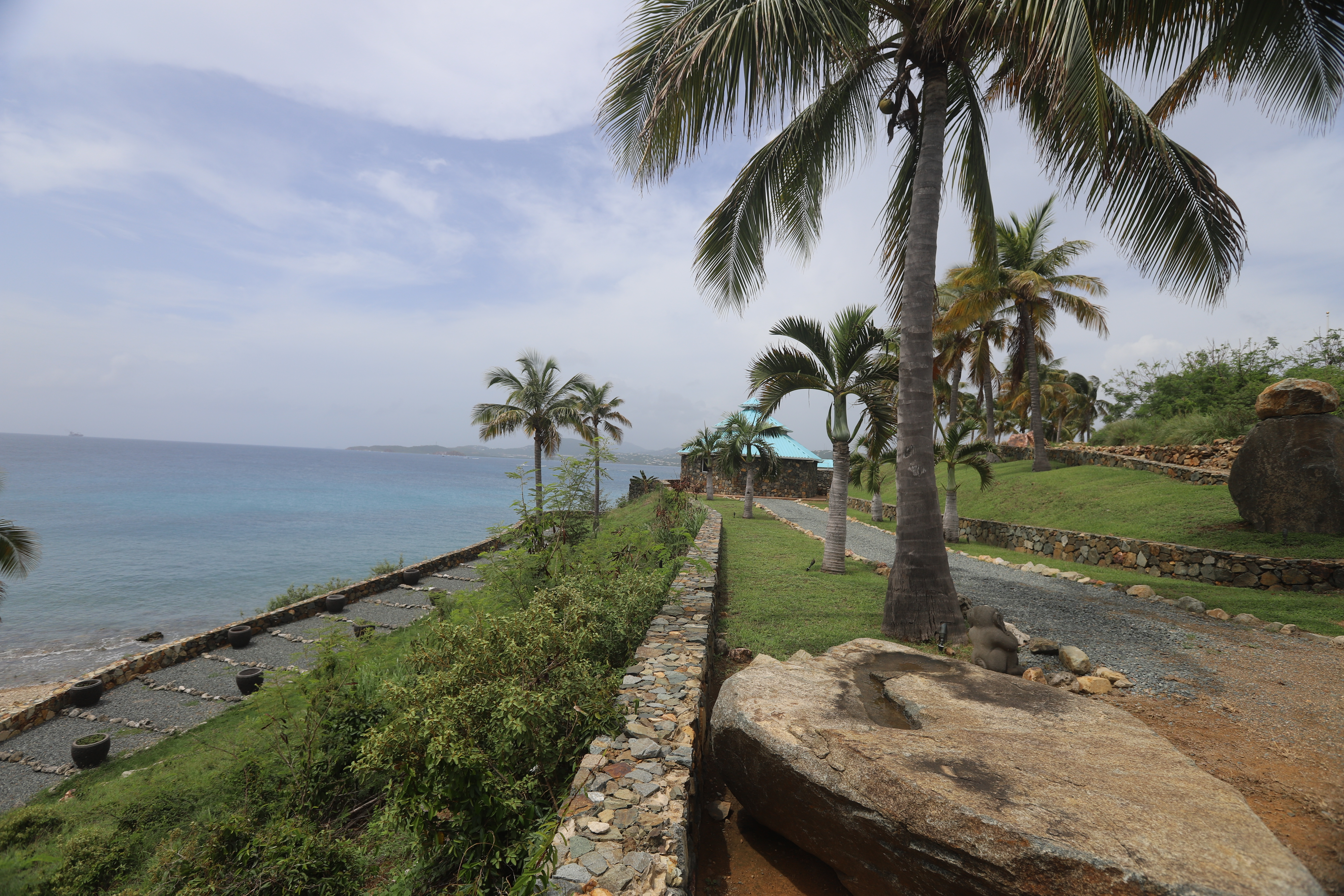

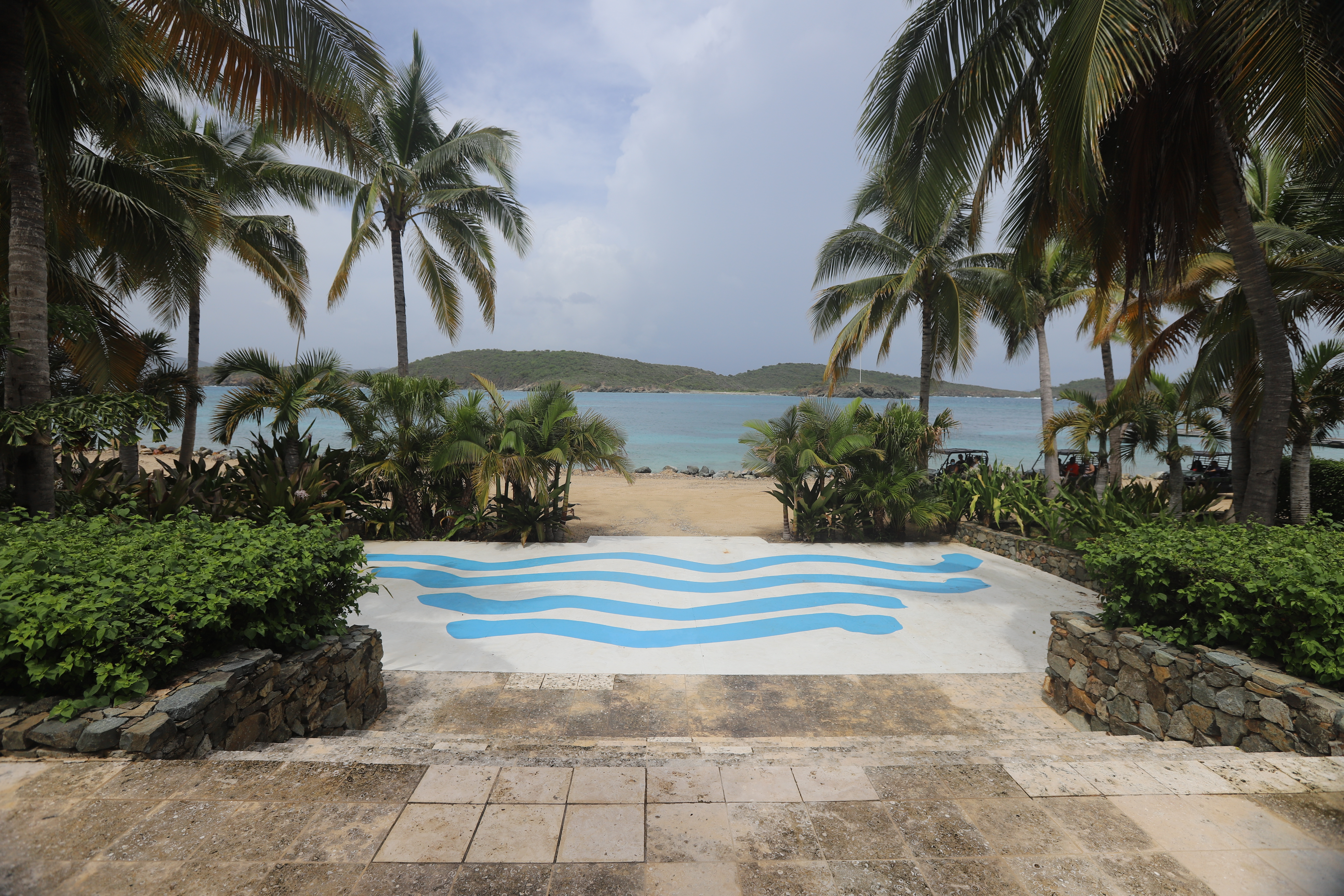
Walkway towards the beach area from helipad

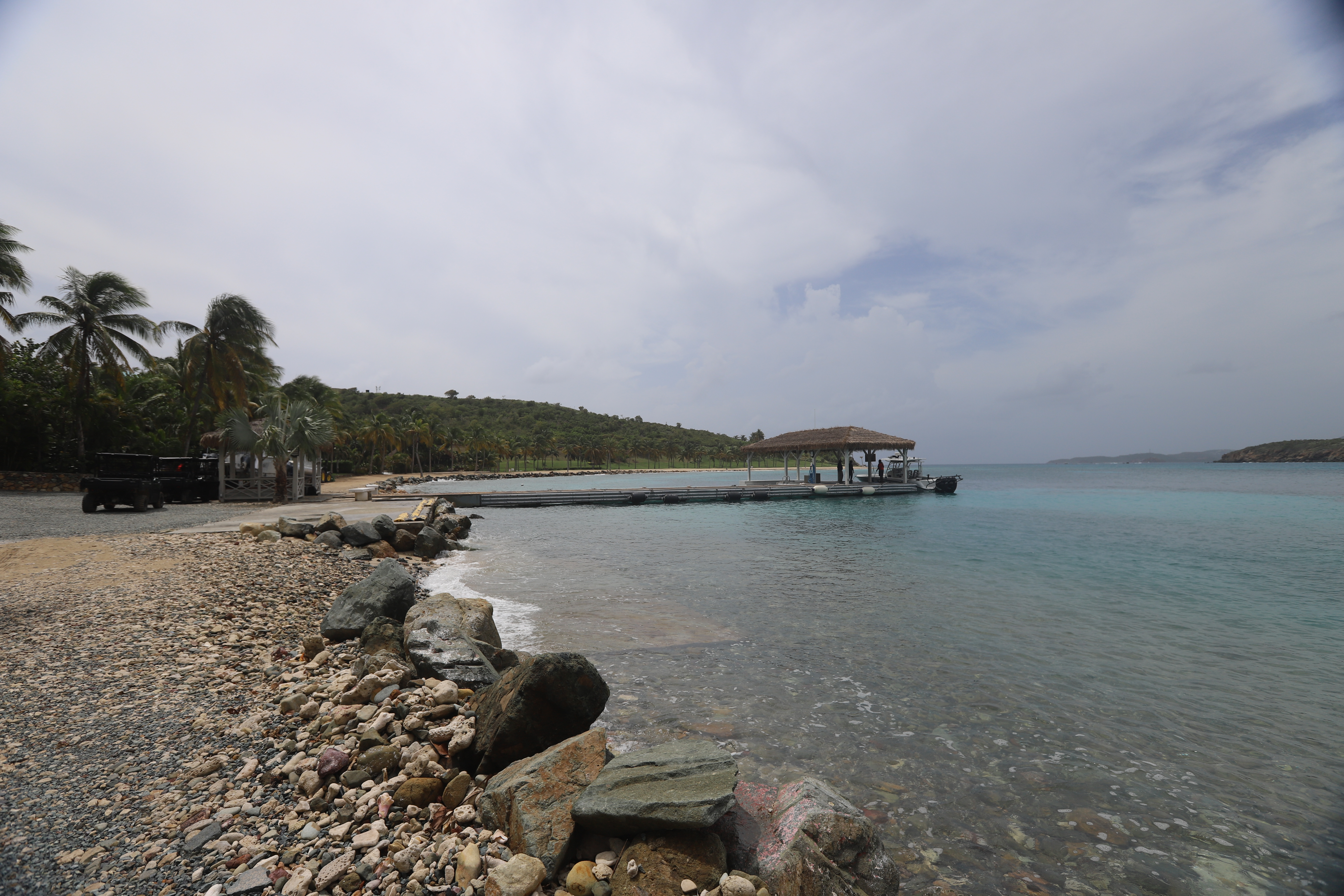
Rocky shoreline and the dock

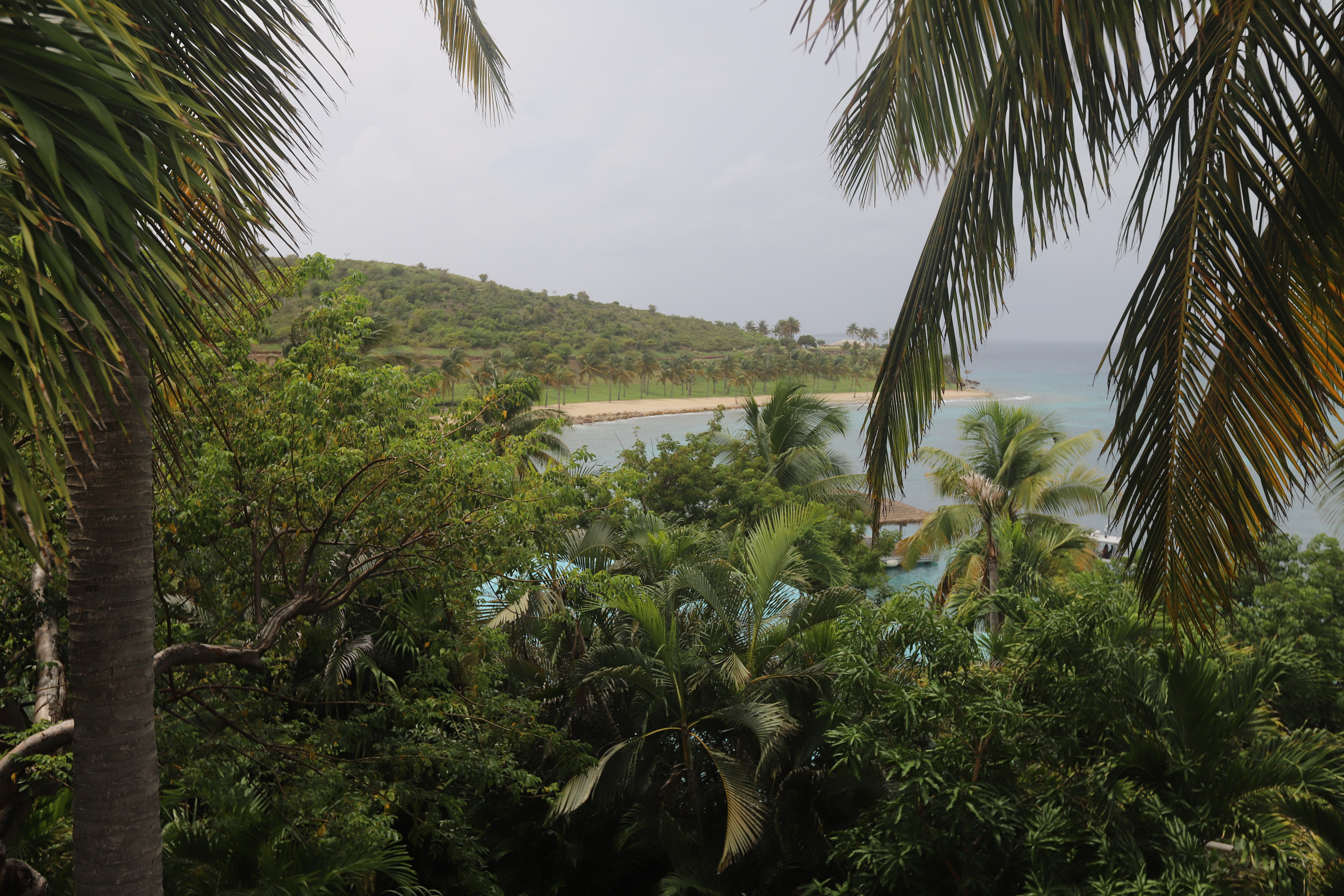
View towards the dock and the pool house

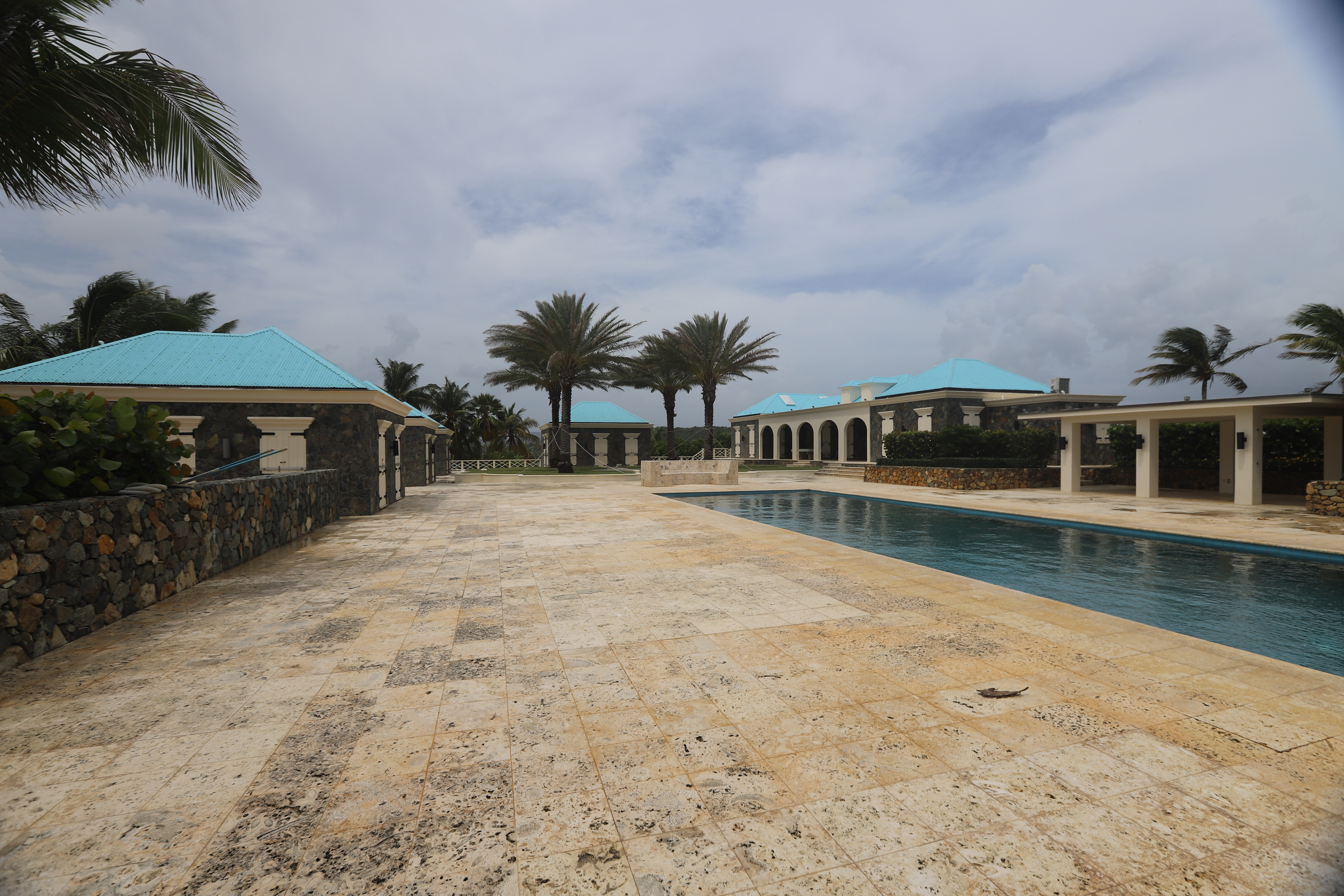
Buildings of the main area. Four guest houses on the left.

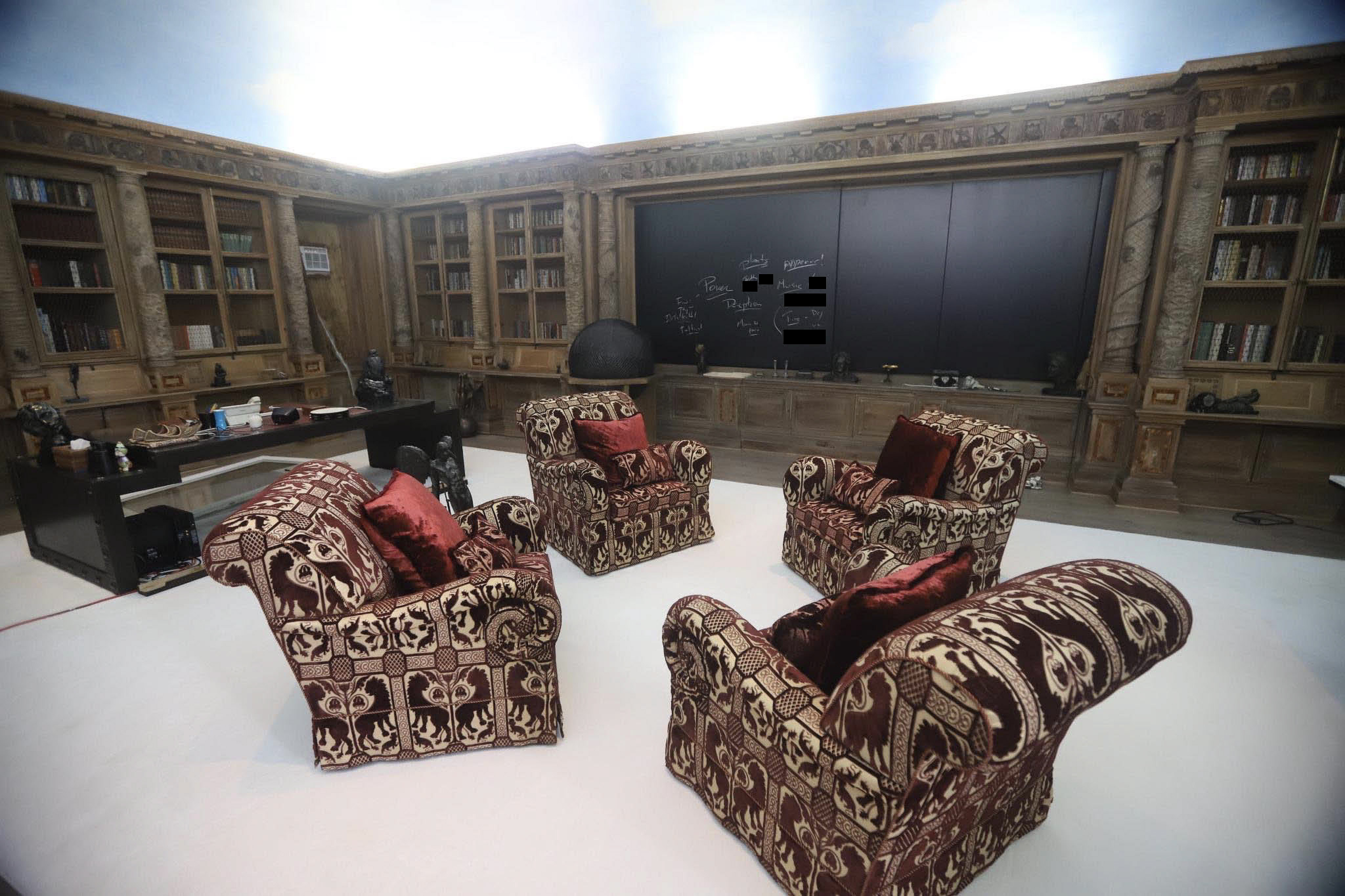
The interior of the Epstein's Cabana with a desk and a blackboard

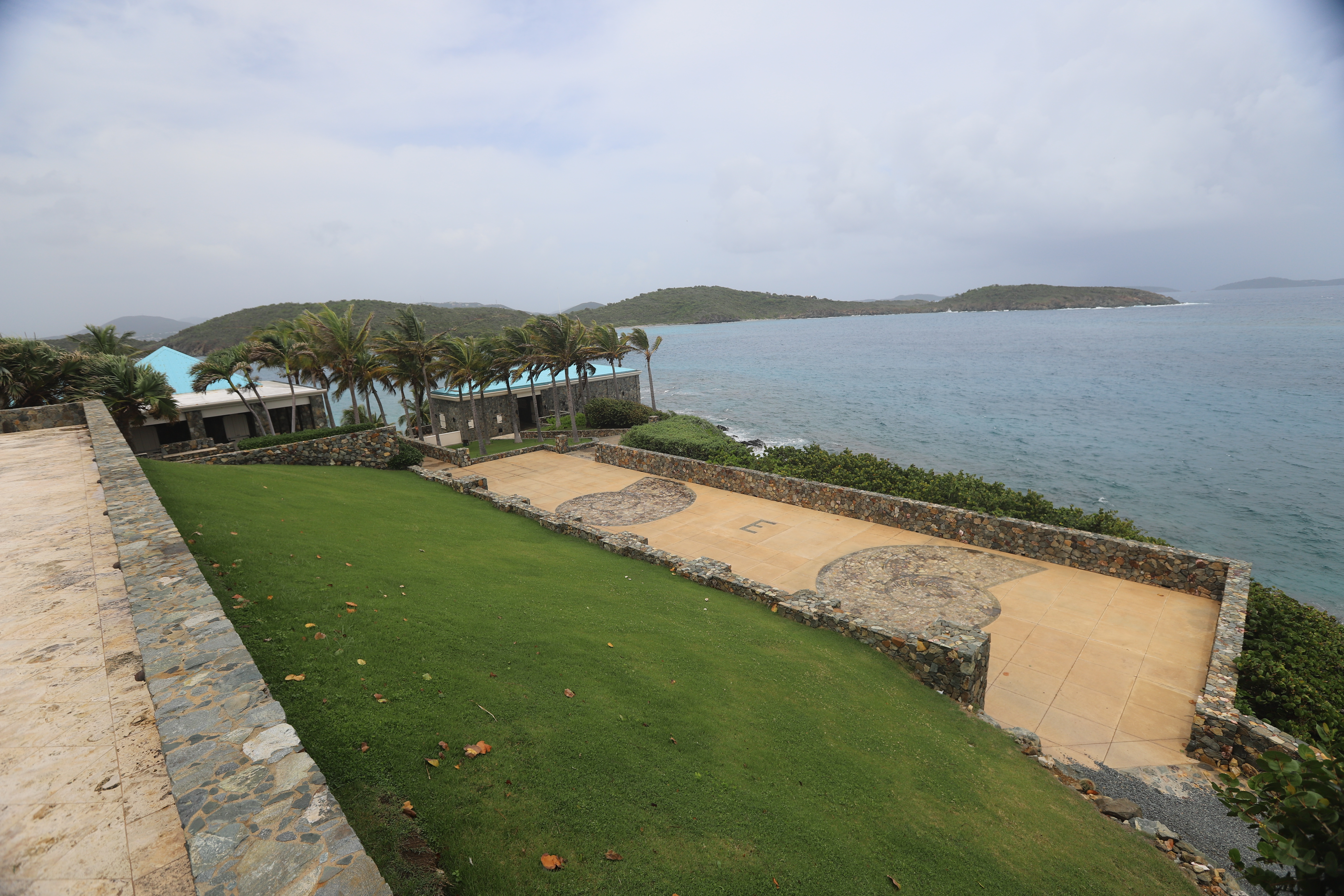
A view from the Main Residence deck area

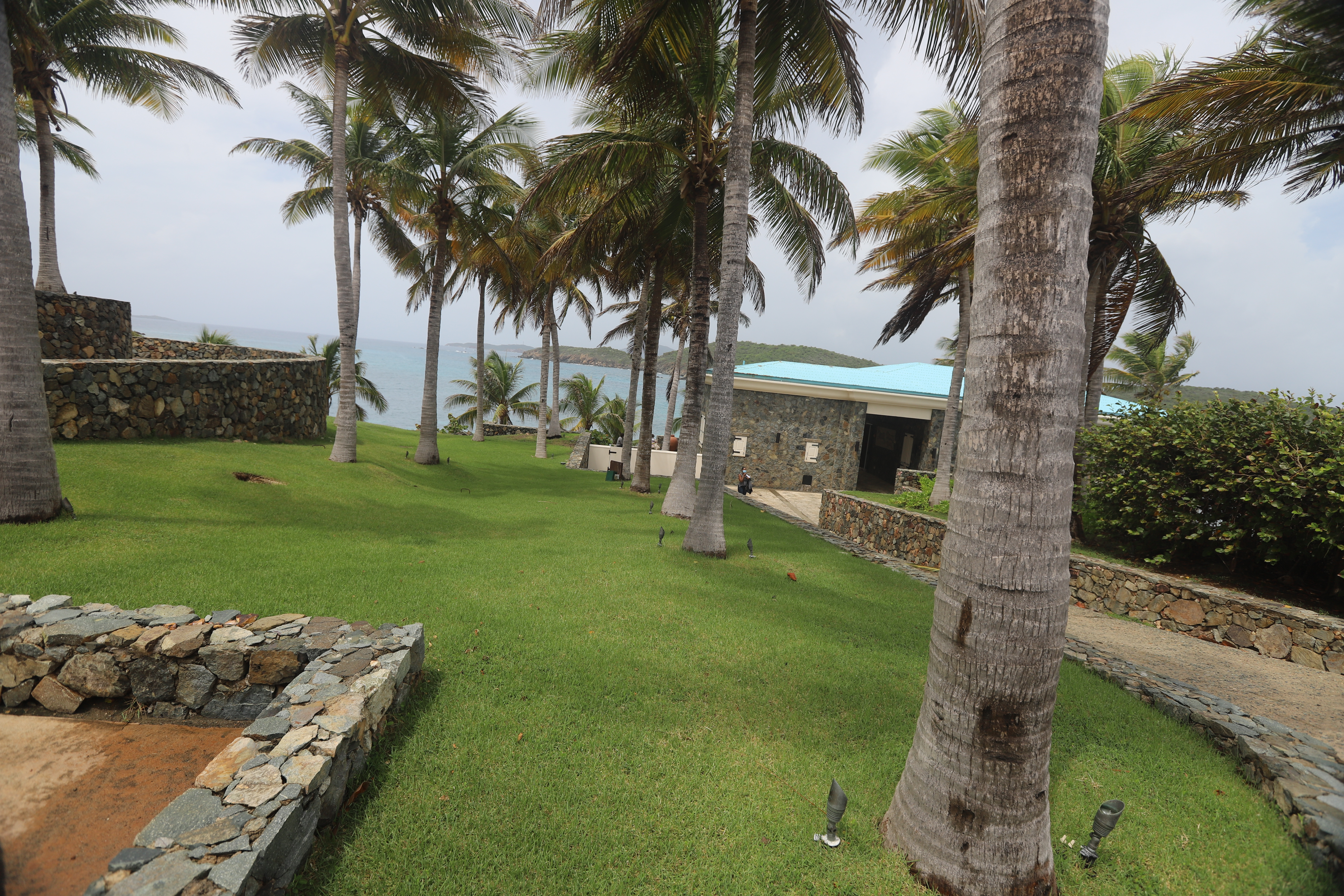

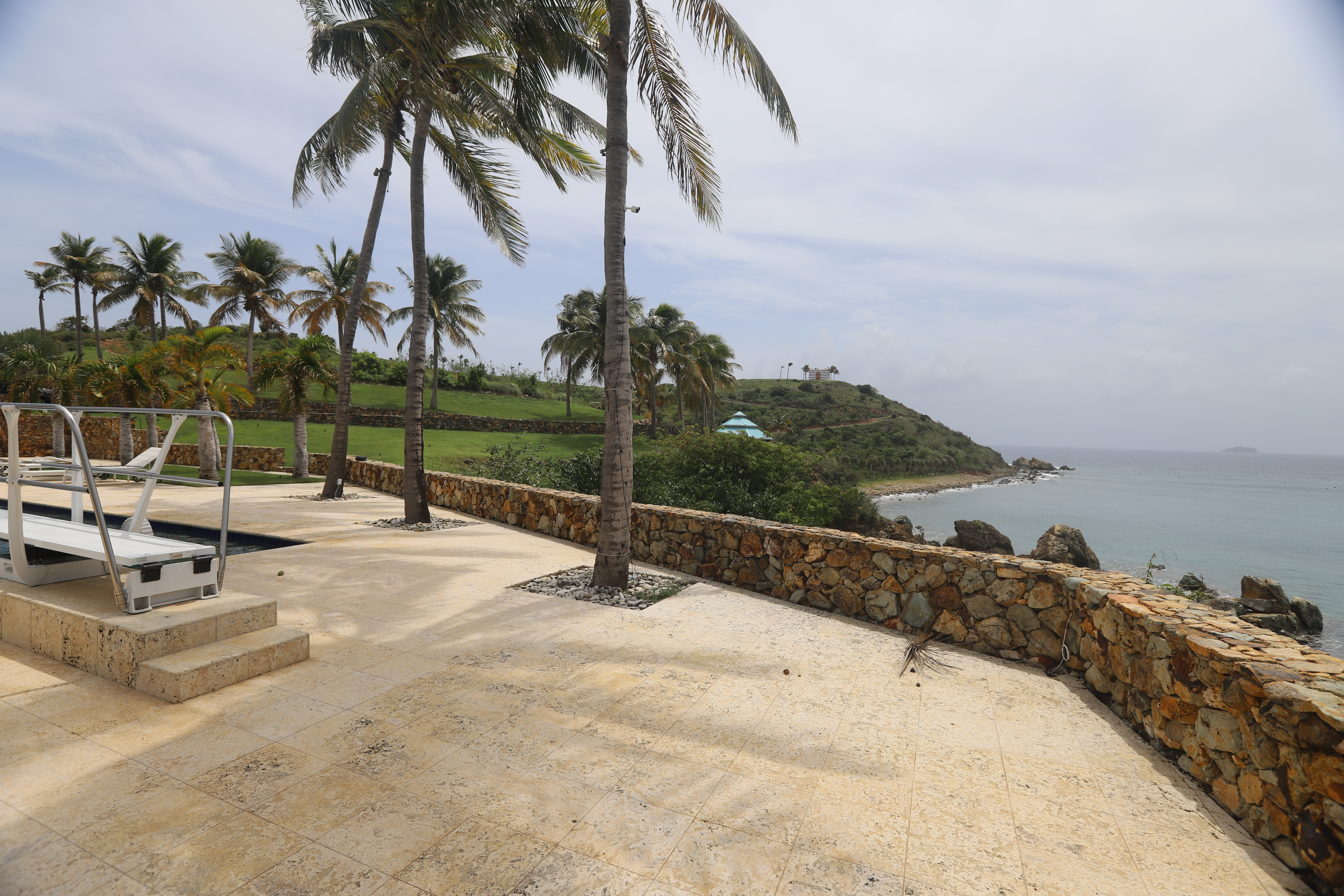
A view from the pool house towards the temple

== See also ==
- Age of consent in the U.S. Virgin Islands
