= Burwick (surname) =

Burwick is a surname. Notable people with the surname include:

- Kimberly Burwick, American poet
- Marlene Burwick (born 1971), Swedish politician

== See also ==
- Barwick (surname)
- Berwick (surname)
- Borwick (surname)
