= Great Saint James =

Private island in the U.S. Virgin Islands

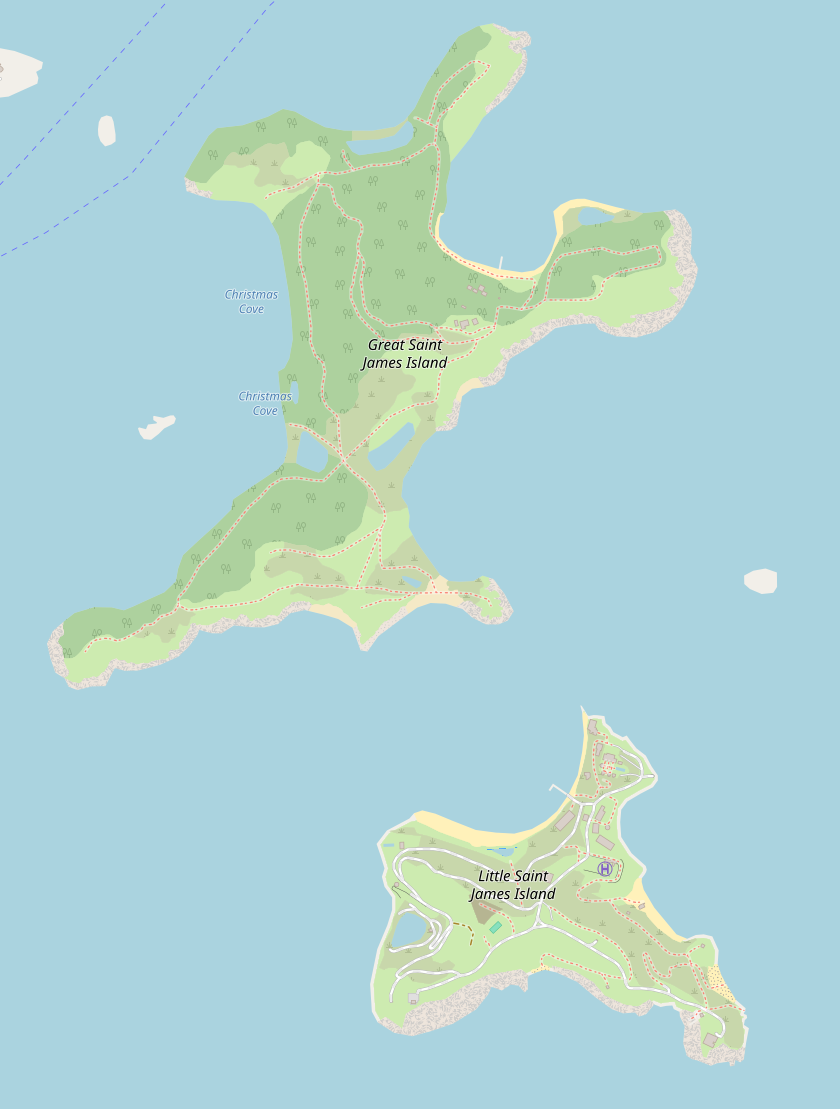
- Overview of Great Saint James (top) and Little Saint James (bottom)

- Location in the Caribbean Great Saint James (the Caribbean)

Geography
- Location: Caribbean Sea
- Coordinates: 18°18′35″N 64°49′44″W
- Area: 165 acres (67 ha)

Great Saint James is a private island in the United States Virgin Islands, located off the east end of St. Thomas and belonging to subdistrict East End, Saint Thomas. The island is approximately 165 acres (67 ha) in size, and is located 0.4 kilometres (0.25 mi) southeast of Saint Thomas. The island was most notably owned by financier and sex offender Jeffrey Epstein, along with the neighboring Little Saint James island.

The cove on the west side of Great Saint James, Christmas Cove, is a popular snorkeling and mooring spot for day charter boats and yachts. Twenty-two overnight mooring balls are available (but are not regularly maintained).

== Ownership ==
=== Before Epstein's ownership ===
Great Saint James was worth US$3 million at one point when a woman owned it. She later died in a Swiss chalet. The island was subsequently divided into parcels and three people inherited it.

Family members of the Danish politician Christian Kjær had owned Great Saint James since the late 1970s. Miami Dolphins player Jason Taylor purchased the island with assistance from real estate businessmen Robert Addie and Jorge M. Pérez in 2004. However, a lawsuit exchange ensued and lasted until December 2013 when Taylor received "much but not all" of his down payment, as reported by the Miami Herald.

=== Jeffrey Epstein ===
Great Saint James was purchased in 2016 for US$22.5 million by financier and sex offender Jeffrey Epstein, who already owned the neighboring Little Saint James island. The Danish newspaper B.T. has reported that at some point while Kjær owned 80.1 acres (32.4 ha) of the island, Epstein had attempted to purchase the island, but that the sale had not gone through, partially because islanders "begged" Kjær and his wife Susan Astani not to sell the land to Epstein. Astani said that at the time there were rumors about Epstein's "sexual preferences". In order to conceal his identity, Epstein made Sultan Ahmed bin Sulayem the ultimate beneficial owner against his will and purchased Kjær's three parcels through his shell corporation Great St. Jim LLC, for US$17.5 million on January 18, 2016. He bought the rest of the island (twelve parcels totalling 81.22 acres (32.87 ha)) through the same LLC from GSJ Properties Corp. for US$5 million on January 21, 2016.

Epstein had been in conflict with the Virgin Islands Department of Planning and Natural Resources (DPNR) over land use regulations. DPNR Commissioner Jean-Pierre Oriol has said, "Since there's been an active owner of the island, there's been construction within three months of that, so it's been pretty active." Great St. Jim LLC has authorized several officers of Epstein's nonprofit Gratitude America Ltd. to act on behalf of Poplar Inc., whose president is Epstein according to an incumbency certificate, with respect to all transactions including those related to permitting matters. In April 2016, after DPNR received complaints about Epstein clearing the island without a permit, a cease and desist was ordered and Great St. Jim LLC was initially fined US$280,000, but Epstein settled for a US$70,000 fine. Epstein also sent US$320,000 in total in checks through his foundations to the non-profit Saint Thomas Historical Trust in order to circumvent fines by the government. However, Epstein had reportedly misunderstood an order to send a part of the settlement to a local preservation project. According to a lawyer for Epstein, the donations were returned to Epstein by DPNR employees in 2017. Historical Trust's president Malcolm Schweizer said in August 2019: "If any agreement was made with Epstein on behalf of the St. Thomas Historical Trust to return the funds, it was done fraudulently and without our knowledge. I still plan to pursue return of the entire $320,000 to the St. Thomas Historical Trust, and am awaiting the results of an investigation by the FBI before I take further action". Epstein was issued another cease and desist order by DPNR on October 28, 2016, for not permitted "development in the coastal zone".

The Virgin Islands Daily News have reported communication between Epstein's staff and DPNR regarding building plan permits and permit applications. Documents and plans show a private road, "a barge dock, two homes, cottages, an amphitheater, gardens, a marine electrical cable, solar array and generator, storage building, security building, work-shed and machine shop and an 'underwater office & pool'. The permit application addresses mitigation efforts for endangered corals and the Virgin Islands tree boa, which was spotted on the island during site visits, and indicates that the public will still have free access to the island's shoreline, which includes Christmas Cove". According to New York magazine, Epstein "shut down Christmas Cove" after he purchased the island.

On December 21, 2018, Epstein received a stop-work order from Coastal Zone Management. He was subsequently accused of violating the order "by not removing a beach bar cabana and by expanding a driveway", according to The New York Times. DPNR Commissioner Jean-Pierre Oriol has said that Epstein could be fined over US$1 million for construction activity including "an excessive amount of additional roadways that have been carved out on the island, [for] there have been two jetties, fill material has been placed into the submerged lands, so there's evidence of work going beyond what was initially applied for. The exact amount of things is still yet to be determined". According to The Virgin Islands Daily News, photos on social media showed construction work around June 2019. By July 2019, Coastal Zone Management and Epstein's representatives agreed to a site visit for inspection. They had been working to resolve environmental issues such as those that had arisen from erosion and cutting a road. DPNR Assistant Commissioner Keith Richards said that "Epstein's representatives [had] applied for at least four minor permits", but that "only one minor permit for the construction of a flagpole and repair of cisterns [had] been approved". Coastal Zone Management ordered one of the jetties to be removed. Around July 2019, the United States Environmental Protection Agency visited Great Saint James.

Epstein was arrested in July 2019 and admitted in an affidavit that he owned Great Saint James. After Epstein's death in August 2019, multiple permits were still pending. A survey company owned by a civil engineering companies owner from Saint Croix applied for a temporary barge landing permit to allow construction work. The owner, Jeffrey Bateman, said of Epstein: "He just had a lot of money. People with a lot of money can buy islands." Epstein had not built anything on Great Saint James prior to his death.

Great Saint James and the neighboring Little Saint James were listed for sale at $125 million in March 2022. A lawyer for Epstein's estate stated that they planned to use the proceeds from the sale to settle a number of lawsuits. Bespoke Real Estate, the agency jointly overseeing the sale, stated that further information on the listing was only available to prospective buyers.

=== After Epstein's ownership ===
In May 2023, billionaire Stephen Deckoff, under his firm SD Investments, announced the acquisition of Great St. James and Little St. James for $60 million.

== Gallery ==
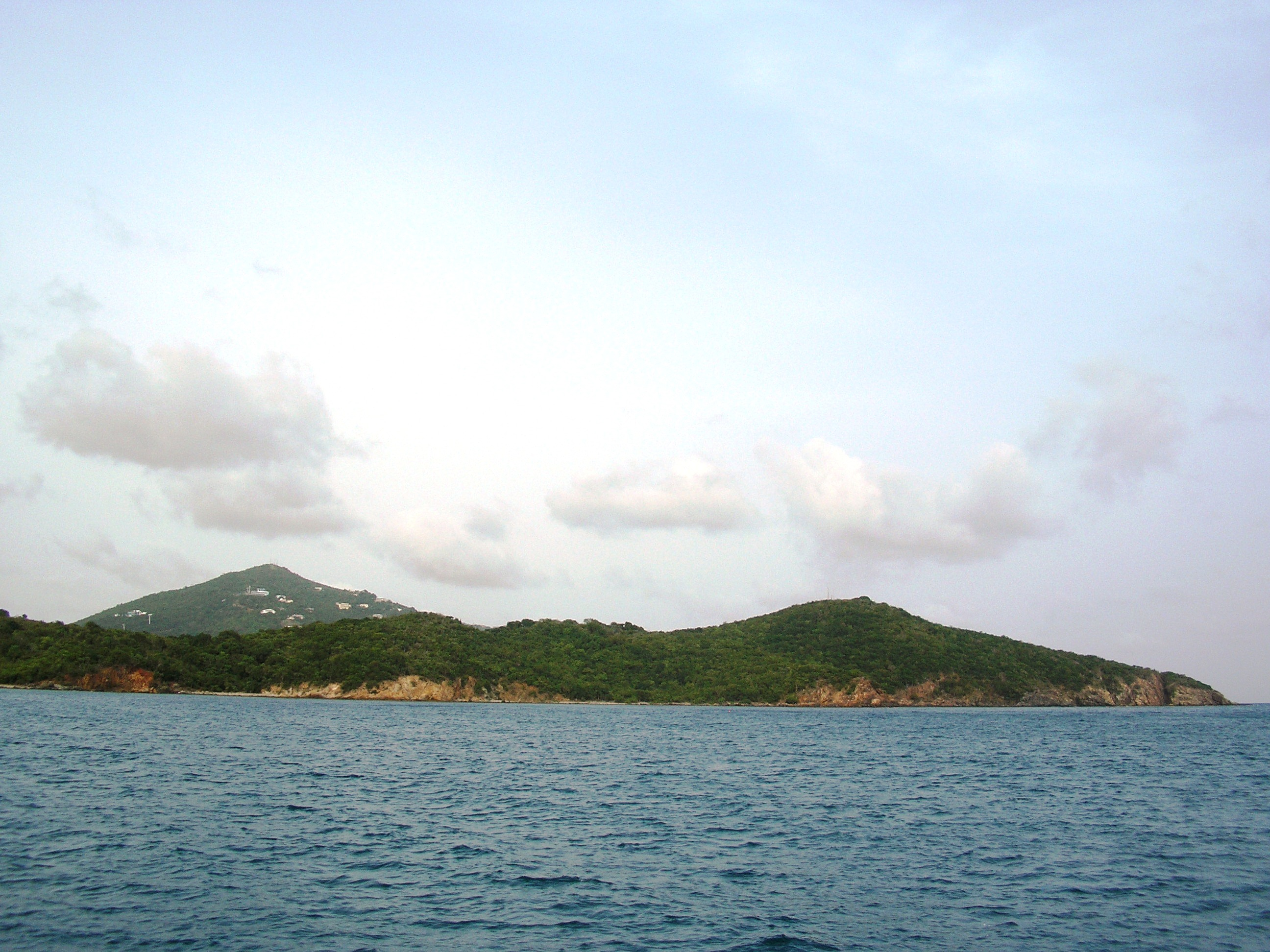
Great St James

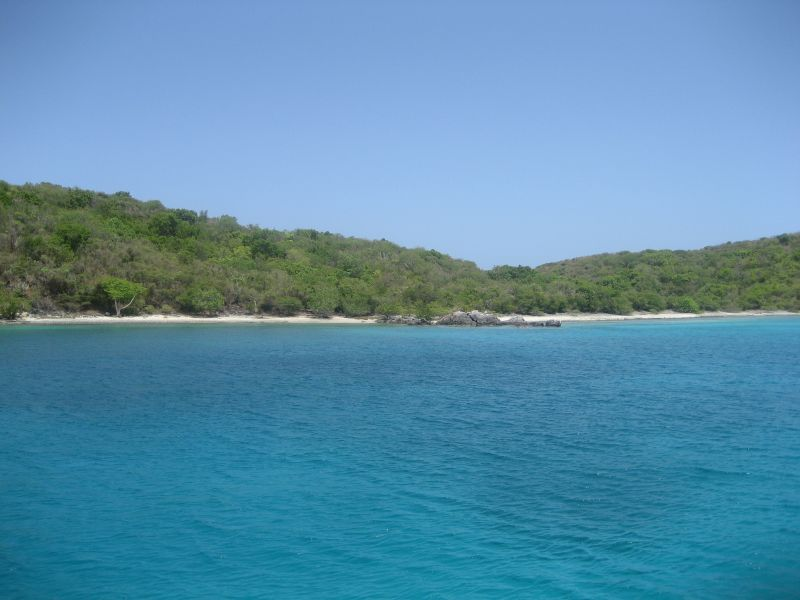
Christmas Cove

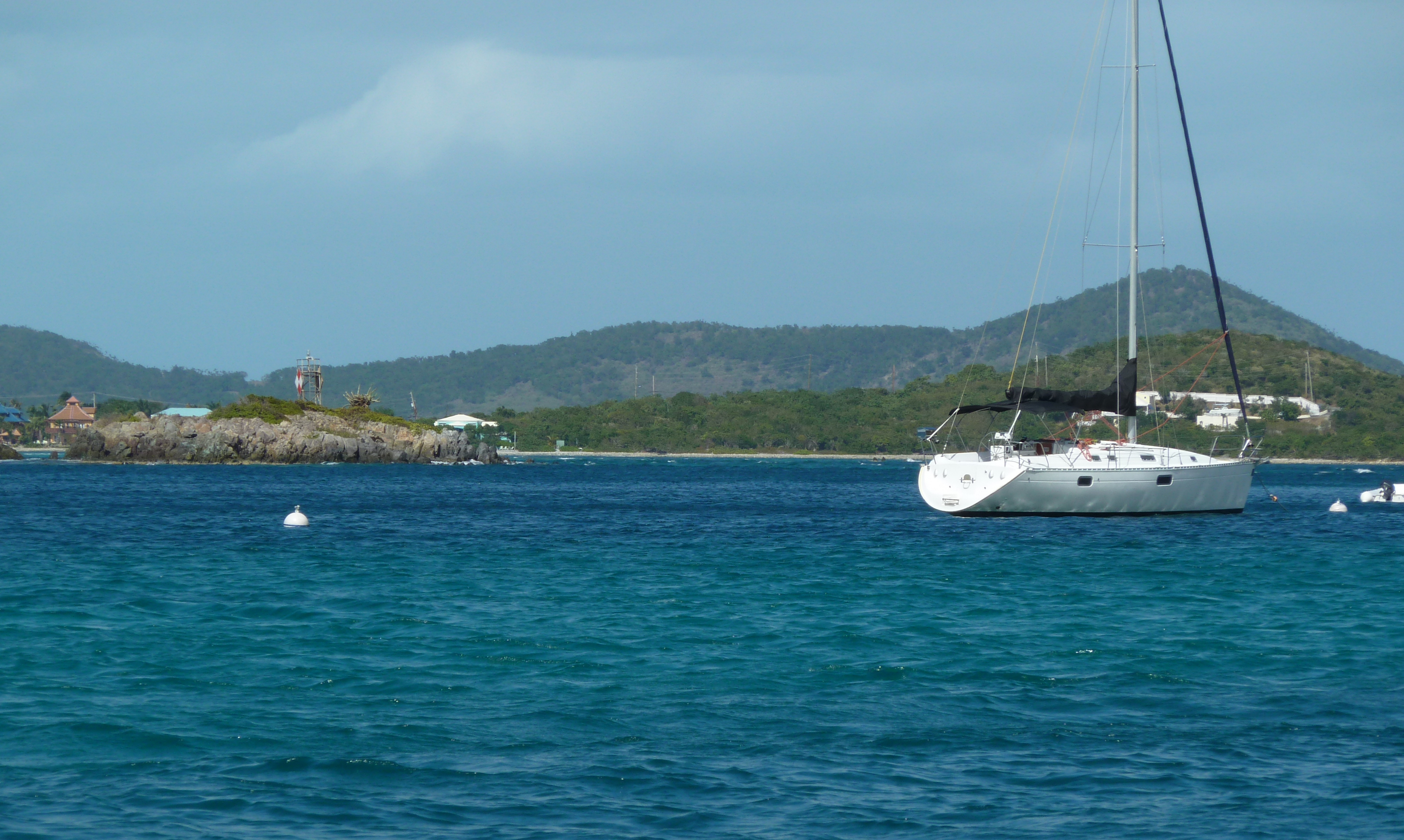
Buildings on shore
