= Berrick =

Berrick is a given name. Notable people with the name include:

- Berrick Barnes (born 1986), Australian rugby union footballer
- Berrick Saul (1924–2016), economic historian

== See also ==
- Berrick Salome, village and civil parish in South Oxfordshire, England
