= Acts of independent significance =

Doctrine allows changing will by acts

The doctrine of acts of independent significance at common law permits a testator to effectively change the disposition of his property without changing a will, if acts or events changing the disposition have some significance beyond avoiding the requirements of the will.

The doctrine is frequently applied under the following two circumstances:

1. The testator devises assets to a class of beneficiaries where the testator controls membership. For example, Joey leaves the contents of his bank account "to my employees." If Joey then fires some of old employees and hires new ones, the new employees will inherit the contents of the bank account under this provision.
2. The testator devises a general type of property, and then changes the specific items of property within that category. For example, Joey writes in his will, "I leave my car to Rachel". Joey drives a 1974 AMC Gremlin at the time of the testamentary instrument, but later sells the Gremlin and purchases a 2016 Rolls-Royce Phantom Drophead Coupé with suicide doors and teak paneling. Because Joey bought a new car to get a more comfortable ride, rather than to change a will without going through the testamentary formalities, the gift to Rachel remains enforceable.

The Uniform Probate Code states,

A will may dispose of property by reference to acts and events that have significance apart from their effect upon the dispositions made by the will, whether they occur before or after the execution of the will or before or after the testator's death. The execution or revocation of another individual's will is such an event.
