= Pour-over will =

Will that creates a trust and orders the estate distributed to the trustee

A pour-over will is a testamentary device wherein the writer of a will creates a trust, and decrees in the will that the property in their estate at the time of their death shall be distributed to the Trustee of the trust. Such device was always void in English common law, because it was not deemed a binding trust, in that the testator can change the disposition of the trust at any time and therefore essentially execute changes to the will without meeting the formalities required for the change.

More recently, a number of jurisdictions have recognized the validity of a pour-over will. In the jurisdictions in the U.S. which allow a pour-over will, testators do not usually put all of their assets into trusts for the reasons of liquidity, convenience, or simply because they did not get around to doing so before they died.

A pour-over clause in a will gives probate property to a trustee of the testator's separate trust and must be validated either under incorporation by reference by identifying the previously existing trust which the property will be poured into, or under the doctrine of acts of independent significance by referring to some act that has significance apart from disposing of probate assets, namely, the revocable living trust (inter vivos trust). The testator's property is subject to probate until such time as the pour-over clause is applied, and the estate assets "pour" into the trust. The trust instrument must be either in existence at the time when the will with the pour-over clause is executed, or executed concurrently with the will to be a valid pour-over gift. However, the trust need not be funded inter vivos. The pour-over clause protects property not previously placed in a trust by pouring it into the previously established trust through the vehicle of the will.
