= Burwick, Shetland =

Small peninsula in the Shetland Islands, Scotland

Coordinates: 60.1507°N 1.2994°W

Burwick is a small peninsula north of Scalloway in the Shetland Islands, Scotland. The Hill of Burwick rises to 107 metres (351 ft), the Ness of Burwick is a headland that guards the bay of Bur Wick, and Burwick Holm is a small island with an elevation of about 10 metres (33 ft), just off shore in the Scalloway Islands.
