= William Berwick (footballer) =

English footballer

Personal information
- Full name: John William Berwick
- Date of birth: 30 November 1884
- Place of birth: Northampton, England
- Date of death: 1948 (aged 63–64)
- Position: Inside right

Senior career*
Years	Team	Apps	(Gls)
1910–1912	Glossop	25	(7)
1919	Everton	1	(0)
Total		26	(1)
- * Club domestic league appearances and goals

John William Berwick (30 November 1884 – 1948) was an English professional footballer who played in the Football League for Glossop and Everton as an inside right.

== Personal life ==
On 28 January 1915, five months after Britain's entry into the First World War, Berwick enlisted in the British Army. He served in the King's Shropshire Light Infantry, the Cheshire Regiment and finished the war as a corporal in the Labour Corps.

== Career statistics ==
Appearances and goals by club, season and competition
Club	Season	League			FA Cup		Total	
Club	Season	Division	Apps	Goals	Apps	Goals	Apps	Goals
Everton	1919–20	First Division	1	0	0	0	1	0
Career total			1	0	0	0	1	0
