= Jeff Berwick =

Canadian-Dominican entrepreneur, libertarian

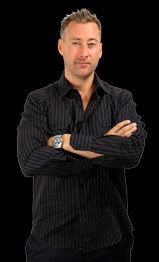
- Self-portrait photograph, 2012
- Born: Jeffrey David Berwick
- Occupations: Entrepreneur, activist
- Known for: Founding Anarchapulco
- Spouse: Kena Moreno

Jeffrey David Berwick is a Canadian-Dominican entrepreneur, libertarian and anarcho-capitalist activist. Berwick founded Stockhouse.com in 1994. In the late 1990s, the company expanded into eight countries and had 250 employees and a market cap of $240 million, during the tech bubble. He sold the company in 2002. Berwick later invested in Bitcoin, appearing publicly on Fox News and other mainstream press outlets to discuss the digital currency. He also appeared on Bloomberg to discuss Bitcoin. In 2013, Berwick launched the world's first Bitcoin ATM in Cyprus.

In 2016, Berwick acquired Dominican Republic citizenship.

== Career ==
In 2009, he founded The Dollar Vigilante, an anarcho-capitalist blog focusing on gold, silver, mining stocks, Bitcoin and offshore banking.

Berwick was host of Anarchast, an interview-style anarcho-capitalist podcast founded in 2012.

In 2013, Berwick announced his plans to co-found the world's first bitcoin ATM in Cyprus. Business Insider called the plans "bogus" and "almost certainly nonsense".

In 2013, Berwick promoted Galt's Gulch Chile project, a libertarian enclave in the Curacaví region of Chile that did not come to fruition as envisioned. He was also part of an attempt to start a free-trade zone in Honduras.

In 2015, Berwick started Anarchapulco, an annual anarcho-capitalist conference held in Acapulco, Mexico.

== Media coverage ==
In 2022 HBO released an original six-part television documentary series entitled The Anarchists. The series is based on six years of video collected by Todd Schramke, and focuses on Berwick, his beliefs, and several of his adherents, including Nathan and Lisa Freeman and a couple known as John Galton and Lily Forester.

== Personal life ==
In July 2005, Berwick's catamaran, caught in a 50 knot squall, was driven into the rocks and sank. Berwick and his partner survived by holding onto a broken surfboard.
