= Jeffrey Epstein: Filthy Rich =

American television miniseries

- Genre: Documentary
- Based on: Filthy Rich: A Powerful Billionaire, the Sex Scandal that Undid Him, and All the Justice that Money Can Buy: The Shocking True Story of Jeffrey Epstein by James Patterson
- Directed by: Lisa Bryant
- Music by: Justin Melland
- Country of origin: United States
- No. of seasons: 1
- No. of episodes: 4

Production
- Executive producers: Joe Berlinger; Jon Doran; Lisa Bryant; Jon Kamen; James Patterson; Bill Robinson; Leopoldo Gout; Peter Landesman
- Producers: Lori Gordon-Logan; Bill McClane; Frank Ombres; John Scholl
- Editors: Cy Christiansen; Joshua L. Pearson; Marion Delarche; James Steelman; Maria Cataldo; Manny Nomikos
- Running time: 55–57 minutes
- Production companies: RadicalMedia; JP Entertainment; Third Eye Motion Picture Company

Original release
- Network: Netflix
- Release: May 27, 2020

Jeffrey Epstein: Filthy Rich is an American web documentary television miniseries about convicted sex offender Jeffrey Epstein. The miniseries is based on the 2016 book of the same name by James Patterson, and co-written by John Connolly and Tim Malloy. Filthy Rich was released on May 27, 2020, on Netflix. The four-part documentary features interviews with several survivors including Virginia Giuffre and Maria Farmer, along with former staff members and former police chief Michael Reiter, a key individual from the first criminal case against Epstein.

== Premise ==
Filthy Rich tells the stories of the survivors of Jeffrey Epstein, and how he used his wealth and power to commit these crimes.

== Episodes ==
| No. | Title | Directed by | Original release date |
|---|---|---|---|
| 1 | "Hunting Grounds" | Lisa Bryant | May 27, 2020 |
Survivors recount how Epstein abused, manipulated and silenced them as he ran a so-called molestation "pyramid scheme" out of his Palm Beach mansion.
| 2 | "Follow the Money" | Lisa Bryant | May 27, 2020 |
Epstein goes on the offensive as police gather mountains of evidence against him. But how did he acquire the fortune that protected him for so long?
| 3 | "The Island" | Lisa Bryant | May 27, 2020 |
Some of the adult-aged "co-conspirators" of Epstein such as Haley Robson and Courtney Wild claim that they were "victims", and their collaboration recruiting more victims was part of the control Epstein held over them. Other collaborators are ignored, such as Sarah Kellen and Nadia Marcinko. Lawyer Alan Dershowitz explains the strategy used as Epstein's attorney for his legal defense. Dershowitz, who wasn't a member of The Florida Bar, puts together a group of Florida-licensed lawyers to defend Epstein. Epstein brokers a plea deal that's unprecedented in its leniency, Sarah Ransome opens up about the horrors she endured, at the age of 22, on Jeffrey Epstein's private island, Little Saint James.
| 4 | "Finding Their Voice" | Lisa Bryant | May 27, 2020 |
In 2008, Epstein enters a state-level guilty plea in exchange for a federal non-prosecution agreement (NPA) with Alex Acosta's office and serves an 18-month prison term. In 2019, Florida federal Judge Kenneth Marra invalidates the NPA. Virginia Giuffre claims to have been abused by Prince Andrew and Epstein's attorney Alan Dershowitz, who denies having sexually abused anyone. Arrested and charged in 2019 with child sex trafficking, Epstein spends only a short time behind bars, but his accusers still get their day in court.

== Production ==
The miniseries was based on the 2016 book Filthy Rich: A Powerful Billionaire, the Sex Scandal that Undid Him, and All the Justice that Money Can Buy: The Shocking True Story of Jeffrey Epstein written by James Patterson, and co-written by John Connolly with Tim Malloy. Filthy Rich was announced prior to Epstein's death, and was in production nine months prior to his arrest. The project was initially known as The Florida Project, taking precautions as Epstein was still alive, working on a secret server. They also worked in a locked room with cameras and a safe to hold materials.

The trailer for the miniseries was released on May 13, 2020.

== Reception ==
On Rotten Tomatoes, the series holds an approval rating of 82%, based on reviews from 44 critics, with an average rating of 7/10. The website's critics consensus reads: "It lacks new insight, but by focusing on the stories of survivors Filthy Rich sheds light on the lasting impact of Epstein's crimes." On Metacritic, the series has a weighted average score of 61 out of 100, based on 13 critics, indicating "generally favorable reviews".

== See also ==
- Surviving Jeffrey Epstein
- Ghislaine Maxwell: Filthy Rich
