= Jeffrey Epstein =

American financier and child sex offender (1953–2019)

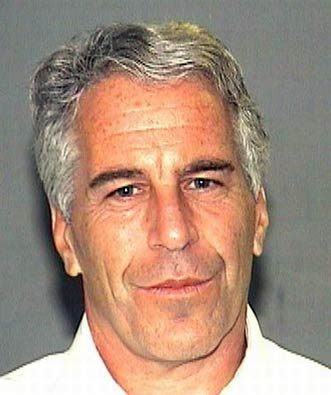
- Mug shot of Epstein, 2006
- Born: Jeffrey Edward Epstein; January 20, 1953; Brooklyn, New York City, U.S.
- Died: August 10, 2019 (aged 66); Manhattan, New York City, U.S.
- Cause of death: Suicide by hanging
- Resting place: Star of David Cemetery, Palm Beach Gardens, Florida, U.S.
- Other name: Marius Robert Fortelni
- Education: Cooper Union (no degree); New York University (no degree)
- Occupations: Financier; broker; educator
- Employers: Dalton School; Bear Stearns; Intercontinental Assets Group; Towers Financial Corporation; J. Epstein & Company
- Relatives: Mark Epstein (brother)
- Status: Deceased
- Convictions: Solicitation of prostitution with a minor; Solicitation of prostitution; (2008)
- Criminal charge: Sex trafficking (2019)
- Penalty: 18 months' imprisonment (2008)
- Accomplice: Ghislaine Maxwell

Details
- Victims: 200+ (Note: At least 200 women received compensation from a survivor's fund for victims of Epstein, The Department of Justice list of 1,200 victims included the "relatives of victims".)
- Date apprehended: July 27, 2006 (first criminal case); July 6, 2019 (second criminal case)

Signature
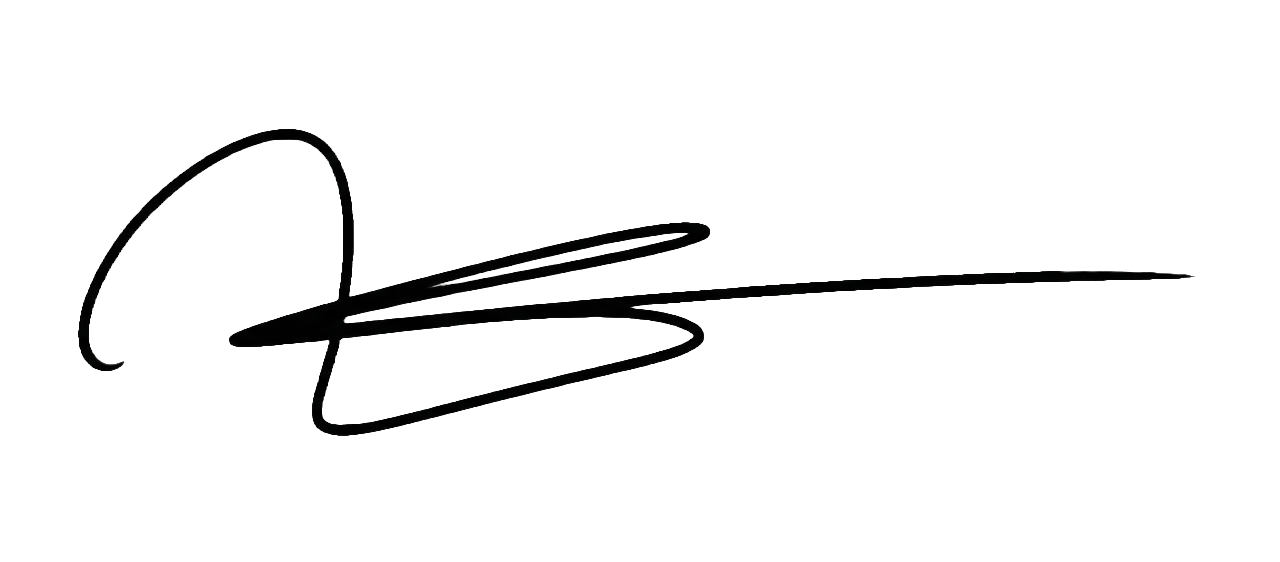

Jeffrey Edward Epstein (Note: Pronounced /ˈɛp.stiːn/ EP-steen. See also: Epstein § Pronunciation.) (January 20, 1953 – August 10, 2019) was an American financier and child sex offender. He began his career as a math teacher at the Dalton School in New York City, before entering the banking and finance sector. Over several decades, Epstein made much of his fortune providing tax and estate services to billionaires, and cultivated an elite social circle of prominent individuals. In 2008, he was convicted of soliciting a minor for prostitution, and was indicted in 2019 for sex trafficking minors in the 2000s. He died in custody awaiting his trial and his death was ruled a suicide.

Police in Palm Beach, Florida, began investigating Epstein in 2005 after a woman reported that her 14-year-old stepdaughter had been paid by Epstein to strip and massage him. Investigators identified 36 girls between the ages of 14 and 17 with similar accounts of sexual abuse. Prosecutors had concerns about taking him to trial, citing victim reluctance to testify and witness credibility. This influenced a now-controversial plea deal negotiation, under which Epstein pleaded guilty to state charges of procuring a minor for prostitution, and soliciting a prostitute. He was registered as a sex offender, and served 13 months in jail with work release.

Following Epstein's conviction, victims pursued lawsuits and media scrutiny grew. A 2018 Miami Herald article profiled victim stories, and argued that Epstein had evaded justice under a lenient plea deal. This prompted federal investigators in New York to reinvestigate additional charges, and Epstein was indicted in July 2019 on charges of sex trafficking minors between 2002 and 2005. Epstein died in his jail cell on August 10; his death was ruled a suicide by hanging. His death is the subject of conspiracy theories. Epstein maintained a long association with socialite Ghislaine Maxwell, who was convicted in 2021 for sex trafficking girls to him.

At the time of his death, Epstein's estate was valued at $600 million, from which hundreds of millions have been paid to at least 200 women in legal settlements. Additional settlements of $290 million from JP Morgan, and $75 million from Deutsche Bank, followed lawsuits which alleged these banks had enabled Epstein's abuse by retaining him as a client. (Note: JP Morgan and Deutsche Bank settled without admission of liability.)

Epstein was a friend or acquaintance of many public figures. The Epstein files, a collection of documents which has been partially released as part of the Epstein Files Transparency Act, provide a public glimpse into the vast network he had cultivated over the late 20th and early 21st centuries.

== Early life ==
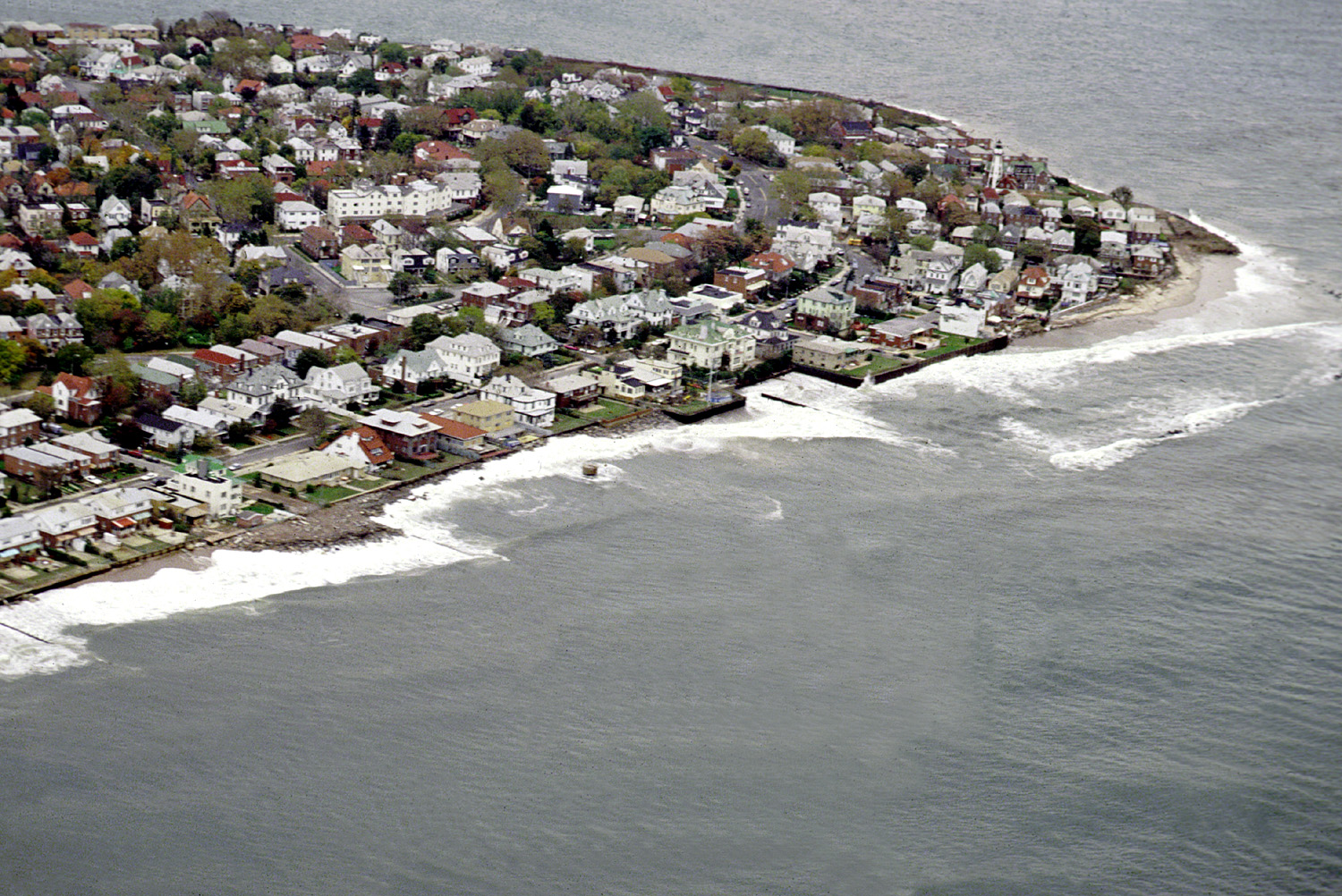
Epstein's childhood neighborhood of Sea Gate, Brooklyn

Jeffrey Edward Epstein was born on January 20, 1953, in Brooklyn, a borough of New York City. His parents, Pauline "Paula" Stolofsky and Seymour George Epstein, were of Lithuanian Jewish and Polish Jewish ancestry, respectively, and had married in 1952 shortly before his birth. Pauline worked as a school aide and was a homemaker. Seymour worked for the New York City Department of Parks and Recreation as a groundskeeper and gardener.

Epstein was the older of two siblings; he and his brother Mark grew up in the neighborhood of Sea Gate, a then working-class gated community in Coney Island. A childhood friend described Paula as "a wonderful mother and homemaker", and neighbors remembered the parents as being quiet and humble. Epstein attended local public schools, first Public School 188 and later nearby Mark Twain Junior High School, and often earned money by tutoring classmates. Acquaintances considered Epstein "sweet and generous" although "quiet and nerdy", and nicknamed him "Eppy". Of Epstein, a female friend later said, "He was just an average boy, very smart in math, slightly overweight, freckles, always smiling."

In 1967, Epstein attended the National Music Camp at Interlochen Center for the Arts. He began playing the piano when he was five, and was regarded as a talented musician by friends. He graduated in 1969 from Lafayette High School at age 16, having skipped two grades. Later that year, he attended advanced math classes at Cooper Union until he changed colleges in 1971. From September 1971, he attended the Courant Institute of Mathematical Sciences at New York University, where he studied mathematical physiology, but left without receiving a degree in June 1974.

== Career ==
=== Dalton School (1974–1976) ===
In September 1974, at age 21, Epstein started working as a mathematics teacher at the Dalton School on the Upper East Side of Manhattan. The school's newspaper announced the hiring of Epstein. Donald Barr, who served as the headmaster until June 1974, was known to have made several unconventional recruitments at the time, although it is unclear whether he had a direct role in hiring Epstein. Three months after Barr's departure, Epstein began to teach at the school, despite his lack of credentials.

One parent recalled his son's belief that Epstein was "popular with students and the school's young female staff members". In 2019, several former students alleged that Epstein paid inappropriate attention to female students, and that he once showed up at a student party, although none said he made physical contact with them.

In early 1976, Epstein attended an art event where he met a Dalton father who worked on Wall Street. The man thought Epstein was "wasting his time" at Dalton, given his knowledge of mathematics, and rang Alan Greenberg – a senior executive at Bear Stearns – to recommend a potential hire. The timing was suitable, as Epstein was soon dismissed from Dalton due to poor performance.

=== Bear Stearns (1976–1981) ===
In 1976, Epstein was interviewed at Bear Stearns, where he reportedly impressed Alan Greenberg, who preferred hiring men of modest backgrounds with "a deep desire to become rich." Epstein met senior trader Michael Tennenbaum, who recalled Epstein as "a hell of salesman". Epstein began at the firm as a low-level junior assistant to a floor trader.

In late 1976, Bear Stearns discovered that Epstein had falsely claimed to have two university degrees on his resume. In Tennenbaum's recollection, Epstein calmly admitted to it, stating that "nobody would give me a chance" without degrees. Tennenbaum agreed to give Epstein another chance. Epstein swiftly moved up to become an options trader, working in the special products division, and in 1980, Epstein became a limited partner at 27 years old with a salary of $200,000 per year (over $800,000 in 2025 dollars).

Epstein began advising clients on tax mitigation strategies. Jimmy Cayne, a senior partner at the firm (and its later CEO) held Epstein in high regard, and introduced him to many of Bear Stearns' wealthiest clients. Epstein appealed to clients; he was reportedly charismatic and offered "complex trading strategies that could save ultrawealthy clients huge amounts in taxes". Epstein began having regular lunches with CEOs and establishing a network of contacts, which according to Tennenbaum, is "what really catapulted" his later success. Alan Greenberg would come to view Epstein as his protégé.

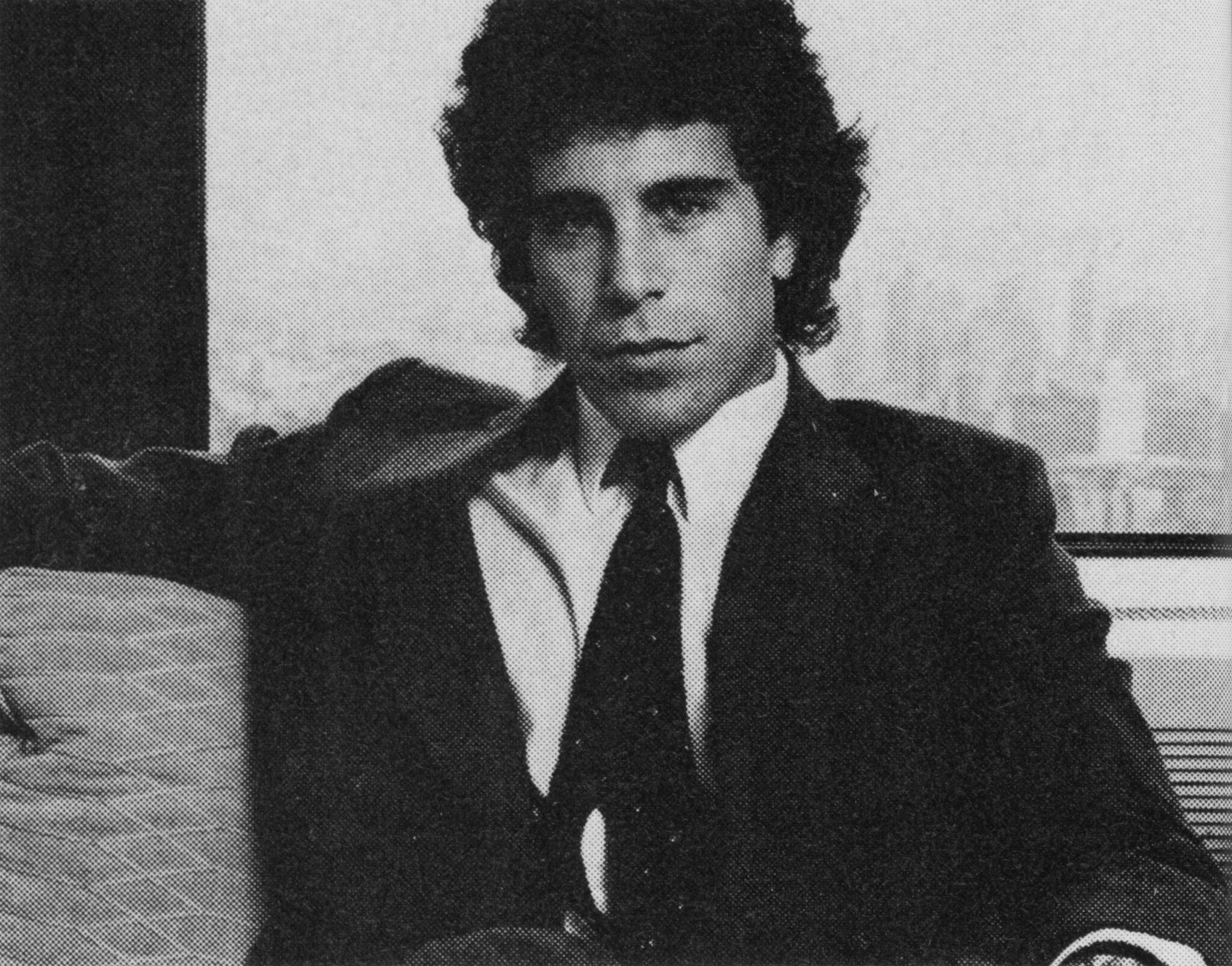
Epstein was Cosmopolitan magazine's "bachelor of the month" in the July 1980 issue

In this period, Epstein was regularly flying to Palm Beach to visit young women. Cosmopolitan named Epstein their "bachelor of the month", and encouraged interested women to write to him. On one work trip, Epstein purchased $10,000 of jewelry and clothing for a girlfriend and charged it to Bear Stearns; although reportedly he faced no consequences.

In 1981, trouble arose for Epstein when the firm investigated a $15,000 personal loan he made to a former classmate, which may have breached federal brokerage rules. The firm also questioned initial public offering shares held by his girlfriend.

Following an internal investigation, Bear Stearns fined Epstein $2,500 and placed him on a two-month suspension. Epstein denied wrongdoing and resigned, ending his five-year tenure in the firm. The experience acquired at Bear Stearns and the contacts mad there, helped Epstein to subsequently establish himself as an independent financial adviser on Wall Street. He remained close to Cayne and Greenberg, and was a client of Bear Stearns until its collapse in 2008.

=== Advisor and financial troubleshooter (1981–1987) ===
In August 1981, Epstein founded his own financial consulting firm, Intercontinental Assets Group Inc. (IAG). While at Bear Sterns, Epstein started a relationship with Paula Heil, a well-connected saleswoman and former Miss Indianapolis. In the early 1980s, Epstein and Heil began taking trips to England. She introduced him to a wealthy defense contractor, Douglas Leese, who had connections in the British government and arms industry. Epstein began spending time in the Leese family's social circle, tutoring Leese's younger son Julian, and accompanying Leese to meetings with prominent figures while serving as a consultant. Epstein traveled multiple times between the United States, Europe, and the Middle East. Leese reportedly introduced Epstein to the financier Steven Hoffenberg.

After several years, Epstein's relationship with Leese deteriorated. Leese accused Epstein of misusing his expense account for personal spending, including Concorde flights and luxury hotel stays.

Epstein returned his focus to New York where he partnered with the lawyer John Stanley Pottinger, (Note: Pottinger later represented a number of women who sued Epstein for sexual abuse allegations.) renting office space on Central Park South, and pitching tax-avoidance strategies to wealthy clients. Epstein sourced clients through former Bear Stearns colleagues, including the businessman Michael Stroll. In 1982, Stroll invested $450,000 with Epstein in what was presented as a crude oil deal. A legal dispute followed and Stroll alleged that Epstein had promised but failed to return the money. The case ended in 1993 when a court ruled Epstein was not personally liable on technical grounds.

In the early 1980s, Epstein reportedly bragged to friends that he was a "bounty hunter" who assisted clients in recovering embezzled funds. In 1982, Epstein was introduced to the Spanish actress and heiress Ana Obregón through a mutual friend, and the pair began dating. The Obregón family, and several other wealthy Spanish families, soon hired Epstein after losing millions of dollars during the collapse of Drysdale Government Securities, owing to fraudulent accounting practices. Epstein recruited a federal prosecutor, Bob Gold, and the pair spent a year trying to find their missing funds that Drysdale had shifted to offshore bank accounts. In 1984, Epstein discovered his clients' funds in a Cayman Islands branch of a Canadian bank. He hired a jet and had the branch manager hand over bond certificates for the funds. Epstein returned the funds to his Spanish clients, and they rewarded him significantly, making him a millionaire.

Reportedly, another client that Epstein helped recover stolen funds was the Saudi Arabian businessman Adnan Khashoggi, who he met through Douglas Leese. Khashoggi was a middleman in transferring American weapons from Israel to Iran as part of the Iran–Contra affair. During this period, Epstein possessed an Austrian passport under a false name. The passport showed his place of residence as Saudi Arabia. According to his lawyers, Epstein acquired the fake passport for security purposes, allowing him to conceal his Jewish identity while traveling in Arab countries, and that Epstein never needed to use it.

By the mid-1980s, Epstein was a valuable client to his former employer Bear Sterns. Epstein was calling his former manager Clark Schubach to place trades on stocks, bonds and options. Epstein also pursued a sexual relationship with Schubach's assistant, a 23 year old Patricia Schmidt, who he tasked with conducting research in the Bear Stearns library on potential clients.

=== Towers Financial Corporation (1987–1993) ===
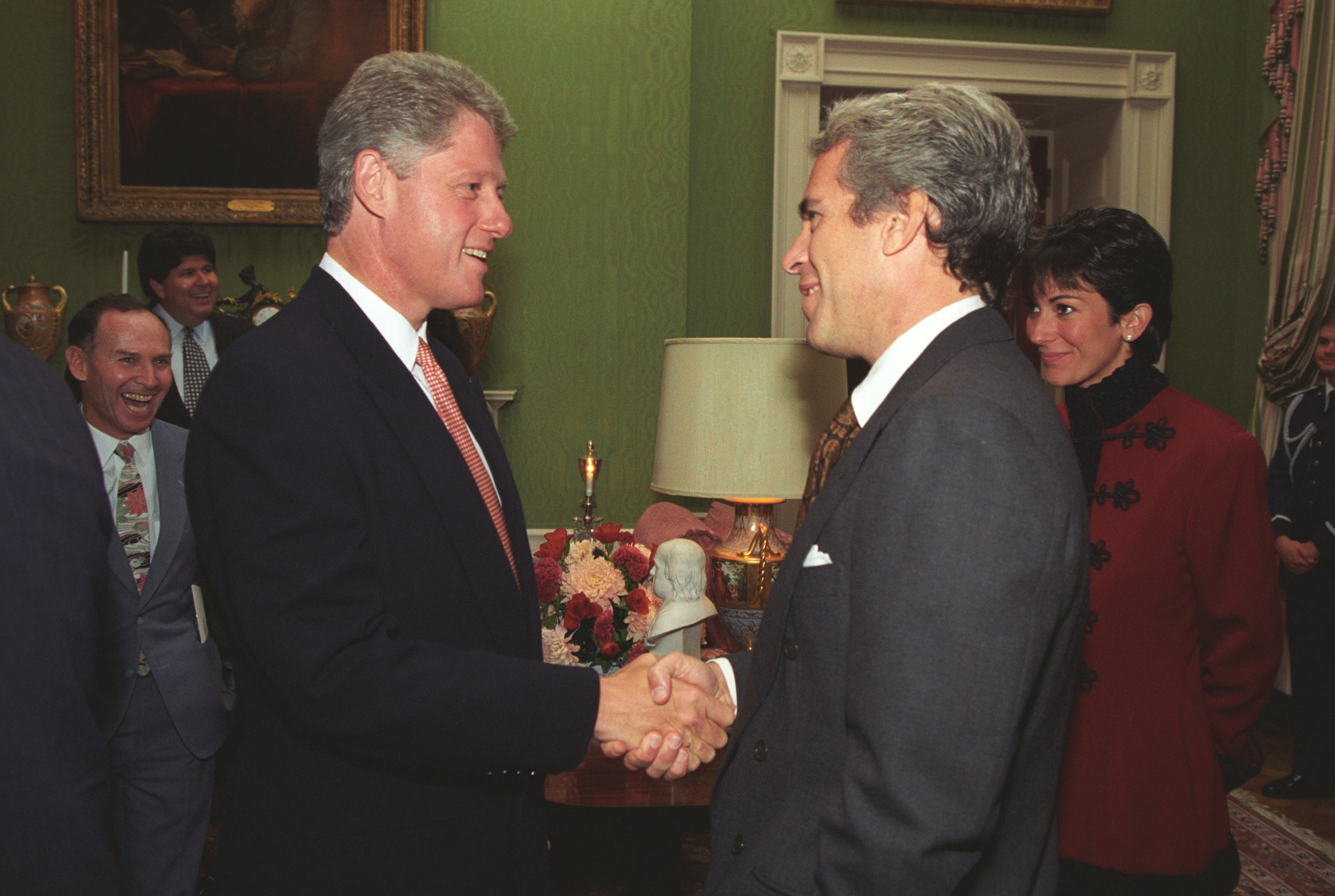
Epstein shaking hands with President Bill Clinton at the White House, September 1993 (with Ghislaine Maxwell in the background on the right)

Steven Hoffenberg hired Epstein in 1987 as a consultant for Towers Financial Corporation, a collection agency that bought debts people owed to hospitals, banks, and phone companies. Hoffenberg set Epstein up in offices in the Villard Houses in Manhattan and paid him US$25,000 per month for his consulting work (equivalent to $71,000 in 2025). Hoffenberg and Epstein then refashioned themselves as corporate raiders using Towers Financial as their raiding vessel. One of Epstein's first assignments was to attempt, unsuccessfully, to take over Pan American World Airways in 1987. A similar unsuccessful bid in 1988 was made to take over Emery Air Freight Corp. During this period, Hoffenberg and Epstein worked closely together and traveled everywhere on Hoffenberg's private jet.

In 1993, Towers Financial Corporation imploded when it was exposed as one of the biggest Ponzi schemes in American history, losing over US$450 million of its investors' money (equivalent to $1 billion in 2025). In court documents, Hoffenberg claimed that Epstein was intimately involved in the scheme. Epstein left the company by 1989 and was never charged for involvement in the massive investor fraud committed. It is unknown if Epstein acquired any stolen funds from the Towers Ponzi scheme.

=== J. Epstein & Company (1988–2019) ===
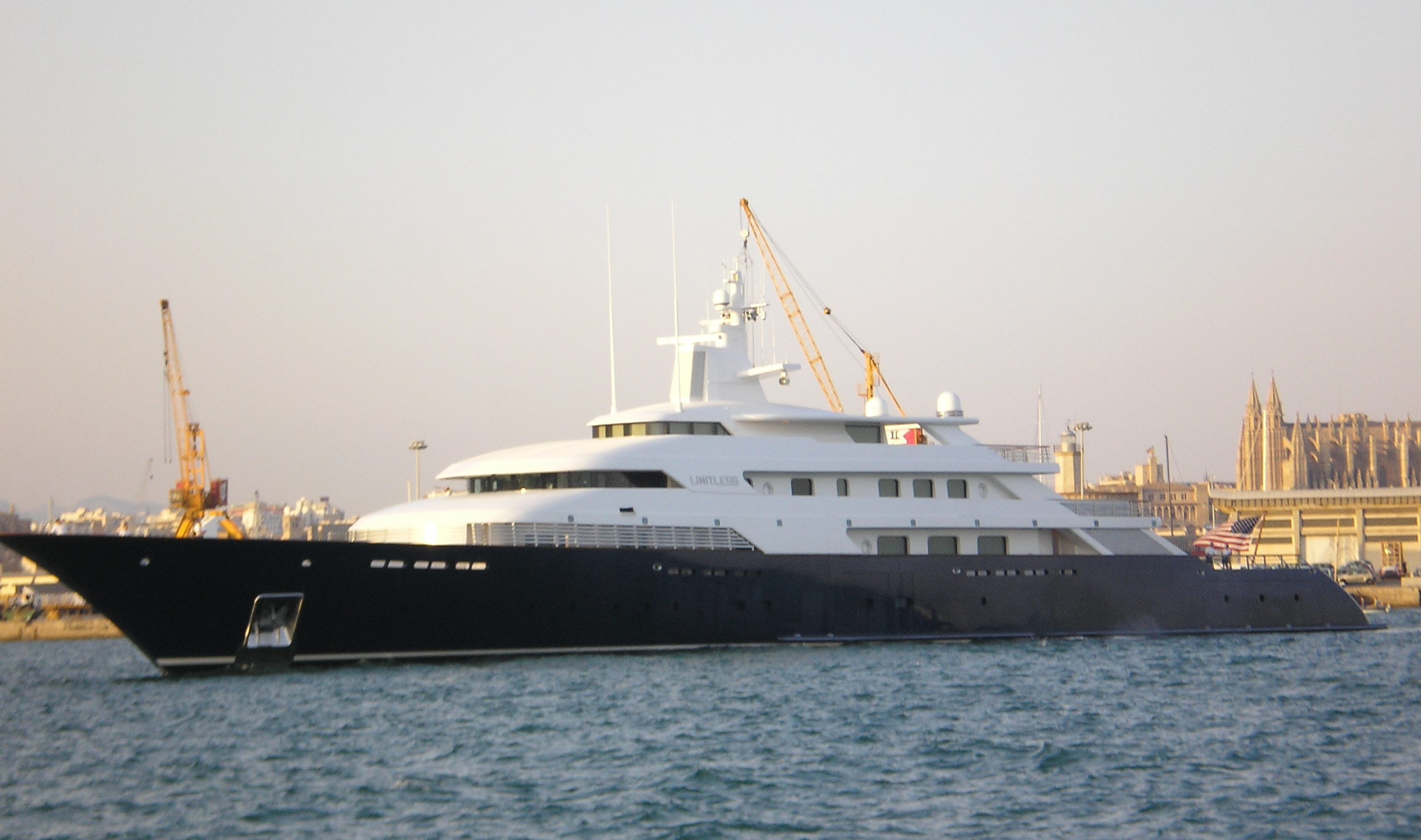
Les Wexner's Limitless moored in Palma de Mallorca

In 1988, while Epstein was still consulting for Hoffenberg, he founded his financial management firm, J. Epstein & Company. According to Epstein, the company managed the assets of clients with more than US$1 billion in net worth, although others have expressed skepticism about that number, as he was secretive of the clients that he took.

The only publicly known billionaire client of Epstein was Leslie Wexner, chairman and CEO of L Brands (formerly The Limited, Inc.) and Victoria's Secret. In 1986, Epstein met Wexner through their mutual acquaintances, insurance executive Robert Meister and his wife, in Palm Beach. A year later, Epstein became Wexner's financial adviser and served as his right-hand man. Within the year, Epstein had sorted out Wexner's entangled finances. In July 1991, Wexner granted Epstein full power of attorney over his affairs. The power of attorney allowed Epstein to hire people, sign checks, buy and sell properties, borrow money, and do anything else of a legally binding nature on Wexner's behalf. Epstein managed Wexner's wealth and various projects such as the building of his yacht, the Limitless. It was during this time that Southern Air Transport relocated its headquarters to service Wexner's brands, and that Epstein dated models like Stacey Williams. Epstein represented himself as a global talent scout for Victoria's Secret during this time and used this powerful position to sexually manipulate young women.

By 1995, Epstein was a director of the Wexner Foundation and Wexner Heritage Foundation. He was also the president of Wexner's Property, which developed part of the town of New Albany outside Columbus, Ohio, where Wexner lived. Epstein made millions in fees by managing Wexner's financial affairs. Epstein often attended Victoria's Secret fashion shows, and hosted the models at his New York City home, as well as helping aspiring models get work with the company. In 1996, Epstein changed the name of his firm to the Financial Trust Company and, for tax advantages, based it on the island of St. Thomas in the U.S. Virgin Islands. By relocating to the U.S. Virgin Islands, Epstein was able to reduce federal income taxes by 90 percent. The U.S. Virgin Islands acted as an offshore tax haven, while at the same time offering the advantages of being part of the U.S. banking system; Epstein, who capitalized on his relation with Jes Staley while the latter was employed by JP Morgan, maintained close relations with that bank's subsidiary in the USVI.

In 2002, as reported by the New York magazine, his financial-administrative staff numbered 150 employees (among whom 20 accountants) across three sites: Villard House in Manhattan, the Wexner operation in Columbus, and St Thomas USVI. Although it took 12 years to deliver the story, as Matthew Goldstein of the New York Times tells it, JP Morgan banker Jes Staley and CEO Jamie Dimon had a falling-out over Staley's client Epstein sometime around 2012, after the general counsel of the bank, Stephen Cutler, complained to Staley and others that Epstein was "not an honorable person in any way. He should not be a client." Despite facing increased pressure from federal regulators, the bank did not discard Epstein until 2013, coincidentally the year of Staley's departure from the bank. Epstein thereafter moved his trade to the American affiliate of Deutsche Bank.

According to Forbes in 2025, Financial Trust Company (FTC) and Southern Trust Company, Epstein's two main businesses, received revenue of over $800 million between 1999 and 2018, consisting of $490 million in fees (most of that from two billionaires, Leslie Wexner, $200 million, and Leon Black, $170 million) and $310 million from investment returns. Due to the U.S. Virgin Islands' tax exemptions, his corporations saved $300 million in taxes and paid an effective tax rate of 4%, even though the top marginal tax rate was 38.5%. In the course of his life, Epstein engaged with no fewer than 75 lawyers, including Alan Dershowitz, Kenneth Starr, Roy Black and Jay Lefkowitz. Senator Ron Wyden said in Congress that the U.S. Treasury Department file on Epstein detailed from one account no less than 4,725 wire transfers that totaled $1.1 billion, and that he had extensive financial correspondence from Russian banks over his sex trafficking activities. Another report from Forbes says that between four banks (JPMorgan Chase, Deutsche Bank, Bank of New York Mellon and Bank of America) the transfers totaled more than $1.9 billion.

==== Liquid Funding and the Bear Stearns implosion (2000–08) ====
Epstein was the president of the Bermuda-incorporated company Liquid Funding Ltd. between 2000 and 2007. The company was a pioneer in expanding the kind of debt that could be accepted on repurchase, or the repo market, which involves a lender giving money to a borrower in exchange for securities that the borrower then agrees to buy back at an agreed-upon later time and price. The innovation of Liquid Funding, and other early companies, was that instead of having stocks and bonds as the underlying securities, it had commercial mortgages and investment-grade residential mortgages bundled into complex securities as the underlying security. Liquid Funding was initially 40 percent owned by Bear Stearns. Through the help of credit rating agencies, the new bundled securities were created for companies so they received an AAA rating. The implosion of complex securities, because of their inaccurate ratings, led to the collapse of Bear Stearns in March 2008, the 2008 financial crisis and subsequent Great Recession. If Liquid Funding were left holding large amounts of such securities as collateral, it could have lost large amounts of money.

In April 2007, the fund had a leverage ratio of 17:1, which meant for every dollar invested there were 17 dollars of borrowed funds; therefore, the redemption of this investment would have been equivalent to removing $1 billion from the thinly traded CDO market. The selling of CDO assets to meet the redemptions that month began a repricing process and freeze in the CDO market. The repricing of the CDO assets caused the collapse of the fund three months later in July, and the collapse of Bear Stearns in March 2008. Losses to investors in the two Bear Stearns funds were $1.6 billion. By the time the Bear Stearns fund began to fail in May 2007, Epstein had begun to negotiate a plea deal with the U.S. Attorney's Office concerning imminent charges for sex with minors. In August 2007, a month after the fund collapsed, Alexander Acosta, the U.S. attorney in Miami, entered into discussions about the plea agreement. Acosta brokered a lenient deal.

The Miami Herald reported that, as part of the negotiations, Epstein provided "unspecified information" to the Florida federal prosecutors for a more lenient sentence and was supposedly "Unnamed investor #1" for the New York federal prosecutors in their unsuccessful June 2008 criminal case against Cioffi and Tannen, two managers of the failed Bear Stearns fund. Alan Dershowitz, one of Epstein's attorneys in the 2008 criminal case, told Fox Business Network in 2019, "We would have been touting that if he had [cooperated]. The idea that Epstein helped in any prosecution is news to me." Moody's reported that on April 18, 2008 "all outstanding rated liabilities" of Liquid Funding were "paid in full". At the time, the liquidator had not yet sold the beleaguered fund to its new owner as of May 1: JP Morgan.

==== Epstein & Zuckerman (2003–2004) ====
In 2003, New York Daily News publisher Mortimer Zuckerman partnered with Epstein, advertising executive Donny Deutsch, and investor Nelson Peltz in a bid to acquire New York magazine. The ultimate buyer was Bruce Wasserstein, a longtime Wall Street investment banker, who paid US$55 million, over US$10 million above the offer from Zuckerman, Epstein, Deutsch, and Peltz. In 2004, Epstein and Zuckerman committed up to US$25 million to finance Radar, a celebrity and pop culture magazine founded by Maer Roshan. Epstein and Zuckerman were equal partners in the venture. Roshan, as its editor-in-chief, retained a small ownership stake. It folded after three issues as a print publication and became exclusively an online one. Also in 2004, Epstein was an early adopter of then "invite only" social network ASmallWorld, this social network also included users such as Lynn Forester de Rothschild, Prince Pavlos of Greece and many other public figures.

===== The TIFR Endowment =====
During the period of 2003, Epstein had provided a cheque of $100,000 to the Tata Institute of Fundamental Research's "TIFR String Theory Travel Fund", Andrew Strominger had facilitated the gift, saying that the string theory team had "the highest intellectual output per dollar of any such group in the world".

==== Zwirn (2002–2008) ====
Between 2002 and 2005, Epstein invested $80 million in the D.B. Zwirn Special Opportunities Fund, a hedge fund that invested in illiquid debt securities. In November 2006, Epstein attempted to redeem his investment after he was informed of accounting irregularities in the fund. By this time, his investment had grown to $140 million. The D.B. Zwirn fund refused to redeem the illiquid investment. The fund was closed in 2008, and its remaining assets of approximately $2 billion, including Epstein's investment, were transferred to Fortress Investment Group when that firm bought the assets in 2009. Epstein later went to arbitration with Fortress over his redemption attempt. The outcome of that arbitration is not publicly known.

==== Epstein and Barak: Carbyne (2014–2019) ====
After his first arrest, Epstein began an interest in the surveillance industry. Epstein maintained a close relationship with former Israeli prime minister and defense minister Ehud Barak, exchanging private emails with him and meeting more than 30 times between 2013 and 2017. He also facilitated Barak's interactions with prominent figures, including Peter Thiel, as well as Sergey Belyakov and Viktor Vekselberg, who were connected to Vladimir Putin's circle. These interactions are documented in the leaked Barak–Epstein emails released by the Handala hacker group, whose authenticity has been partially corroborated by independent reporting, including The Sunday Times.

In business, Epstein leveraged his relationship with Barak to get access to Thiel. In 2015, Epstein invested in Reporty Homeland Security (later rebranded as Carbyne), a startup headed by Barak which developed advanced emergency communication technologies. The company's leadership included CEO Amir Elihai, a former special forces officer, and director Pinchas Bukhris, a former defense ministry director general and commander of the IDF cyber unit 8200. In many years, Epstein's acquaintances had repeatedly encouraged Thiel to meet him. Reid Hoffman, Thiel's friend from the PayPal Mafia, directly introduced the two and joined some meetings.

Epstein pitched Reporty to Thiel-founded Valar Ventures in 2016; although the firm declined, Valar partner Andrew McCormack indicated they might revisit the venture once the company matured. Epstein had previously invested US$40 million into funds managed by Valar in 2015 and 2016. In 2018, another Thiel co-founded firm, Founders Fund, participated in Carbyne's $15 million Series B funding round (non-leading role). Between 2014 and 2016, Thiel had half a dozen scheduled meetings with Epstein at his townhouse, including with other people such as Woody Allen and Kathryn Ruemmler. There is no record of Thiel's social visits to one of Epstein's homes or flights on his private jet.

==== Other businesses ====
Epstein participated in funding rounds for the crypto ventures Coinbase and Blockstream, giving the former $3 million and the latter $500,000 in 2014. Epstein's donation to Coinbase was brokered by Brock Pierce, the co-founder of Tether, while his donation to Blockstream was brokered by Joichi Ito, who was the director of MIT's Media Lab at the time. Barak discussed with Epstein in the leaked Barak–Epstein emails about meeting Putin's ally Viktor Vekselberg on the June 6 and 8, 2014. An email sent in April 2015 showed that Barak had asked Epstein for his opinion on Vekselberg-backed Fifth Dimension, a startup which would later be shut down after being sanctioned in 2018 by the United States for alleged election interference. In August 2018, Epstein said in a New York Times interview that he was helping Elon Musk find a new chairman for Tesla after Musk was in trouble with the SEC over comments that he would privatize the car manufacturer.

=== Geopolitical activities (2012–2019) ===
==== Ivory Coast security agreement ====
Between 2012 and 2014, Epstein assisted Ehud Barak in what began as a private business initiative involving internal security-related projects in Ivory Coast, according to documents released by the U.S. House Oversight Committee from Epstein's files and leaked emails from Barak. Epstein played an operational role in advancing the effort: he coordinated Barak's meetings during the United Nations General Assembly, connected him with Ivory Coast President Alassane Ouattara's chief of staff and other officials, and helped arrange connections with the president's family. Barak, meanwhile, commissioned former Israeli intelligence officers to produce technical plans for nationwide phone and internet monitoring. The private initiative later was the basis of a 2014 defense and internal-security agreement between Israel and Ivory Coast.

==== Mongolia security initiative ====
Epstein performed similar facilitation work as in Ivory Coast for Barak in Mongolia. He assisted in the promotion of Israeli surveillance technology for the Mongolian government. During this period, the Israeli intelligence officer Yoni Koren (a longtime associate and former aide to Barak) stayed multiple times at Epstein's Manhattan residence, including while serving in Barak's office in 2013 and again during extended visits in 2014 and 2015.

== Investigations and legal issues ==
=== First known complaints to FBI and police ===
Artist Maria Farmer, who had worked for Epstein as an art advisor and property manager, alleged in a 1996 report to the FBI that Epstein had stolen nude and semi-nude photographs of her 12- and 16-year-old sisters, sold them, and threatened to burn her house down if she told anyone. According to Farmer, she came to believe Epstein had stolen and sold her photographs after she found them missing from a storage box. She also alleged that Epstein asked her to "photograph young girls" at a swimming pool.

In 1997, a 27-year-old model and actress Alicia Arden filed a report with the Santa Monica Police Department, alleging that Epstein had groped her during a purported audition for Victoria's Secret in a hotel room. According to former Victoria's Secret executives, Epstein, then a financial advisor to the brand's owner Les Wexner, had posed as a modeling scout for the company on several occasions, telling aspiring models he could help them land work. Following Arden's report, a detective contacted Epstein, who gave a conflicting statement. The police report also stated that Arden did not wish to press charges, but wanted Epstein warned. Police closed the case. In 2019, Arden disputed the police record, while police maintained "if the victim tells the detective they do not wish to prosecute, then the detective will close the case".

=== First investigation ===
In a 2001 complaint, three female students at Palm Beach Atlantic University said that they had been approached by Ghislaine Maxwell who recruited them for administrative work at his El Brillo Way home. They claimed that they had been paid $200 a day to answer phone calls came from men saying “when they were going to drop off particular girls.” Additionally, they stated that Maxwell asked them to identify other girls whom she could call for work on short notice. Two said Epstein touched them inappropriately. Police followed up, but closed the file in 2004, having never discovered any illegal activity.

=== First criminal case (2005–2011) ===
==== Initial developments (2005–2006) ====
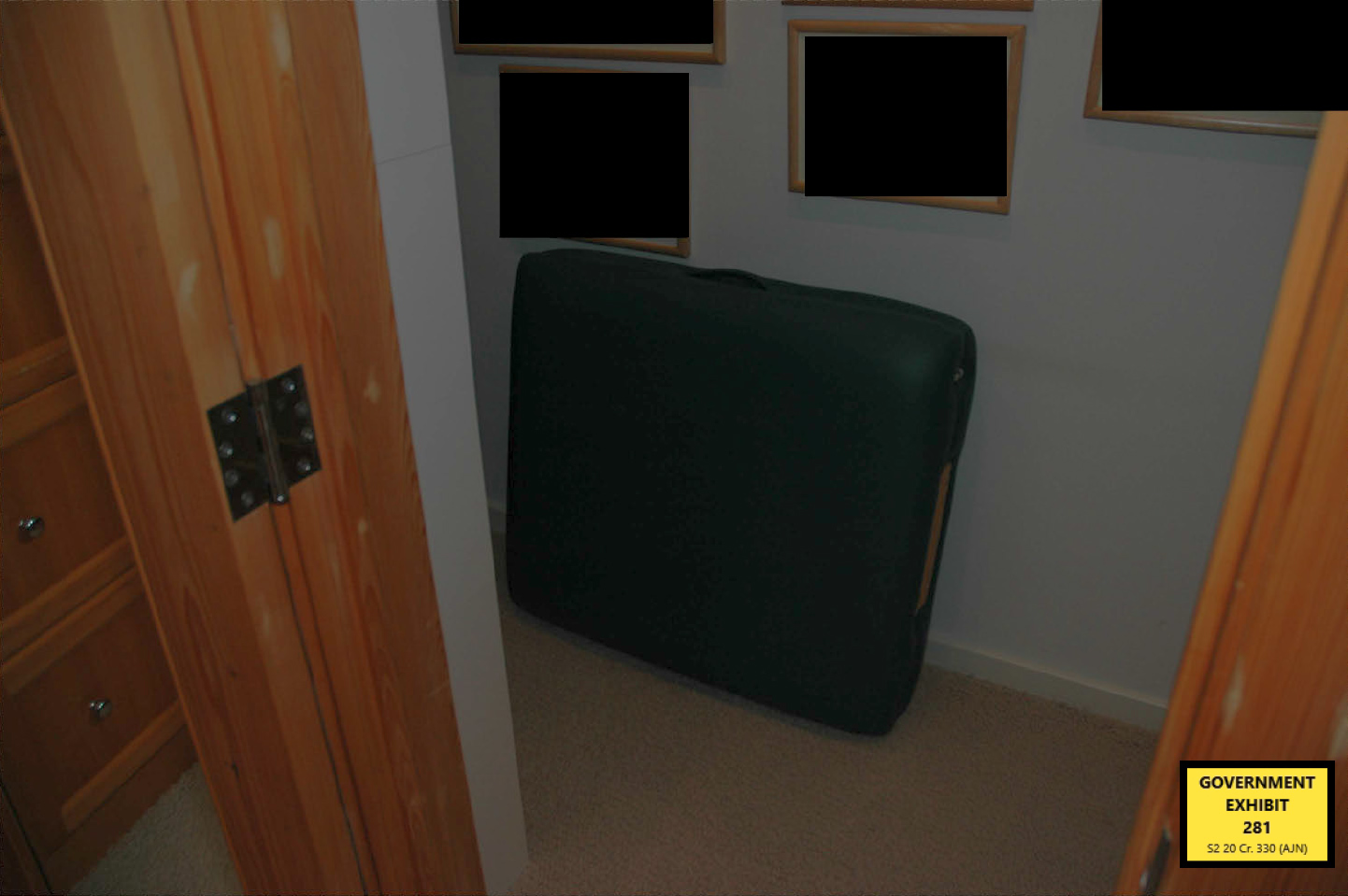
Foldable massage table in Epstein's Palm Beach mansion in 2005

In November 2004, police in Palm Beach, Florida received a tip that young women were coming and going from Epstein's home. Epstein donated $90,000 to the police department on December 14, which followed a previous donation in 2001 or 2002 to the Palm Beach Police Scholarship Fund, which pays scholarships for police officers' children.

In March 2005, a woman contacted Florida's Palm Beach Police Department and alleged that her 14-year-old stepdaughter had been taken to Epstein's mansion by an older girl. While there, she was allegedly paid $300 to strip to her underwear and massage Epstein.

Palm Beach Police then opened a 13-month investigation (2005–2006), in which they monitored Epstein's home, and began finding potential victims. Police identified approximately 35 girls under the age of consent, who had similar stories of sexual massages in return for payment. Some of the girls said that Epstein would pay them $200 for every additional girl he could bring to massage him. Some of the girls told police they were encouraged to lie about being 18 by the older girls who recruited them. Other girls said that they told Epstein their true ages. One employee of Epstein told police that some of the females appeared to be underage.

During their investigation, police determined that Epstein would typically take the girls' telephone numbers after massages. His assistants would schedule massages with the girls and bring them up to his massage room upon arrival.

Epstein soon became aware of the police investigation, and hired defense lawyers counsel, who in turn hired private investigators. When police searched Epstein's home in October 2005, they found disconnected surveillance cameras, but the computer systems that stored their footage were gone. Police were able to recover notepads used by his assistants, which included messages from girls and details of phone calls for scheduling massage appointments. Police found photos of young looking women of "indeterminate age", an Amazon receipt for BDSM books, and a girls high-school transcript.

==== State prosecutor presents case to grand jury ====
Palm Beach Police Department (PBPD) brought the case to Florida State Attorney Barry Krischer. Krischer says he was enthusiastic about pursuing the case; however, both prosecutors and the police held concerns about witnesses and victims.

Epstein's lawyers began investigating victims to challenge their credibility and sending findings to the state prosecutor's office, including: victim criminal records, social media postings about drug use and sex, and victim statements which "appeared to undercut allegations of criminal activity and Epstein's knowledge of victims' ages". State prosecutors were also concerned because their office had previously prosecuted 14-year-olds for prostitution.

In May 2006, Palm Beach police filed a probable cause affidavit that Epstein should be charged with four counts of unlawful sex with minors and one count of sexual abuse.

In July 2006, State prosecutors put the case before a grand jury to determine charges. A police detective and two of Epstein's victims testified. The 14 year old (now 15) said she had told Epstein she was 18 years old, and massaged Epstein for $200 and that he used a vibrator on her for an extra $100. Her social media posts about shoplifting were questioned. The second victim said that Epstein was aware that she was 16, and that sexual activity increased gradually, before Epstein initiated intercourse the day before her 18th birthday.

The grand jury returned a single state charge of felony solicitation of prostitution. Epstein was arrested on July 23, 2006, and pleaded not guilty to solicitation of a prostitute. He was released from Palm Beach County jail on bond.

==== Escalation to FBI and federal prosecutors ====
Palm Beach Police were outraged that the grand jury returned only state charges of prostitution. Police Chief Michael Reiter believed that given the number of girls involved, Epstein should face charges for sex offenses involving minors, and charges of sex trafficking – a more serious federal offense. Reiter accused the state prosecutor, Barry Krischer, of being too lenient and escalated the case to the federal agents at the FBI office in Miami.

The FBI began an investigation into potential federal sex trafficking and interstate crimes. In July 2006, the FBI began its own investigation of Epstein, nicknamed "Operation Leap Year". They conducted interviews with 34 minors whose allegations included corroborating details, and identified additional victims.

==== Federal prosecutors ====
Federal prosecutors in the U.S. Attorney's Office began working with the FBI with the knowledge of U.S. attorney Alexander Acosta. Federal prosecutor Marie Villafaña drafted a 53-page, 60-count indictment related to enticement and trafficking of minors.

The lead federal prosecutor, Matthew Menchel, told Villafaña that Acosta was not ready to go forward with the indictment. Other prosecutors sought to have in-person or phone conversations with defense counsel. According to reporting in Politico two women served as lead prosecutors beginning in 2006 when Epstein first faced charges and were "closely involved in crafting his federal non-prosecution agreement, plea deal and lenient sentence." Lilly Sanchez, one of the lawyers on Epstein's defense, was a former dating interest of Menchel's, who failed to inform his superiors and after he left federal service had several meetings with Epstein to discuss taking on legal work. Epstein's lawyers met with federal prosecutors, asking them to end the federal investigation so Epstein could instead face a single Florida charge of solicitation of a prostitute, and provided numerous legal arguments as to problems with the charges. Epstein's defense lawyers included Roy Black, Gerald Lefcourt, Harvard Law School professor Alan Dershowitz, U.S. special envoy to North Korea Jay Lefkowitz, former U.S. attorney Guy Lewis, and former U.S. solicitor general Ken Starr. Linguist Steven Pinker also assisted.

According to a 2020 Office of Professional Responsibility report, prosecutors in the U.S. Attorney's Office deliberated if they could successfully convict Epstein at trial. Prosecutors found many victims were reluctant to testify against Epstein; some feared public embarrassment, and prosecutor Villafaña said "no victims expressed a strong opinion that Epstein be prosecuted". Prosecutors were concerned about several victims who may have misrepresented their ages to Epstein. They deliberated how teenage girls would fare under cross-examination in a court room – and how this might be traumatizing for them – as Epstein's lawyers planned to aggressively attack their credibility. Legal questions arose over whether federal prosecutors should be pursuing crimes that are traditionally handled by states. Investigators had gathered flight logs with identified females on them, however prosecutors believed this was not strong evidence for trafficking charges because they had no names or ages listed.

Acosta was unhappy with the prospect that the case might return to the state level, where Epstein would receive only prostitution charges, and no prison sentence without registering as a sex offender.

Epstein's October 2007 non-prosecution agreement

Federal prosecutors negotiated a plea deal under which Epstein would be convicted for soliciting a minor for prostitution, solicitation of a prostitute, and was required to register as a lifetime sex offender and serve 18 months. The deal also granted immunity from all federal criminal charges to Epstein, along with four named co-conspirators and any unnamed "potential co-conspirators". The agreement further provided that the parties anticipated it "will not be made part of any public record", and that if the government received a Freedom of Information Act request or other compulsory process commanding its disclosure, it would give Epstein notice before disclosing it.

According to the Miami Herald, the non-prosecution agreement (NPA) "essentially shut down an ongoing FBI probe into whether there were more victims and other powerful people who took part in Epstein's sex crimes." Although press coverage has focused on Epstein's connections to high-profile figures as potential co-conspirators, prosecutor Andrew Lourie argued that the "victims who recruited other underage girls to provide massages for Epstein 'theoretically' could have been charged as co-conspirators", and felt the immunity granted to co-conspirators was "a message to any victims that had recruited other victims that there was no intent to charge them".

Under the agreement, once it was executed alongside a plea agreement with the state, the federal grand jury investigation was to be suspended and outstanding federal subpoenas held in abeyance, to be deemed withdrawn if Epstein completed its terms. The government also undertook to give Epstein's attorneys a list of the individuals it had identified as victims under 18 U.S.C. § 2255, and an attorney representative was to be chosen for those victims and paid for by Epstein. If such a victim then sued under that section, Epstein agreed not to contest the court's jurisdiction and waived his right to contest liability and to contest damages up to an agreed amount, provided the victim proceeded exclusively under § 2255 and waived other claims for damages; the waivers were not to be construed as an admission of liability. Reviewing those provisions in 2021, the Eleventh Circuit described the arrangement as "an odd set-up, and one that, it seems to us, was likely calculated to quickly and quietly resolve as many victim suits as possible".

=== Guilty plea ===
Epstein pled guilty to one count of solicitation of prostitution and one count of solicitation of prostitution with a minor under the age of 18 in the 15th Judicial Circuit in Palm Beach County on June 30, 2008. He was sentenced to 18 months in prison and was required to register as a sex offender. As part of the deal, he was required to pay restitution to three dozen victims identified by the FBI.

A later lawsuit alleged the NPA had violated victims' rights by concealing the agreement from the victims. In 2019, Judge Kenneth Marra for the U.S. District Court for the Southern District of Florida adjudicated that the Acosta NPA document had violated the Crime Victims' Rights Act. However, in 2020 the 11th Circuit Court of Appeals overturned this decision, ruling that prosecutors had not violated victim rights.

According to an investigation conducted by the Department of Justice's Office of Professional Responsibility, released in November 2020, Acosta showed "poor judgment" in granting Epstein a NPA and failing to notify Epstein's alleged victims about the agreement, but determined Acosta operated within the "scope of his authority", and that there was no evidence his "decision was based on corruption or other impermissible considerations, such as Epstein's wealth, status, or associations".

==== Conviction and sentencing (2008–2011) ====
After Epstein pleaded guilty to a state charge of procuring for prostitution a girl below age 18, he was sentenced to eighteen months in prison on June 30, 2008. While most convicted sex offenders in Florida are sent to state prison, Epstein was instead housed in a private wing of the Palm Beach County Stockade, a minimum security detention facility. Epstein was housed at the Stockade's previously unstaffed infirmary, after agreeing to cover the cost of security to watch him. Costs totaled around $128,000, which he covered through the Florida Science Foundation, a foundation he created shortly before reporting to jail. The foundation was designed to provide grants to scientific projects, and was later dissolved after completing his sentence. In August 2008, a memo written by Capt. Mark Chamberlain stated that "For the time being, I am authorizing that his cell door be left unlocked and he be given liberal access to the attorney room where a TV will be installed". It is unclear for how long Epstein's door was unlocked, allowing him to move more freely within the facility.

After 3 1/2 months, Epstein was granted work release privileges for up to twelve hours a day, six days a week, to work at the aforementioned Florida Science Foundation. According to the Miami Herald, Epstein's work release contravened the sheriff's policies requiring a maximum remaining sentence of ten months, and making sex offenders ineligible for the privilege. His office was monitored by police permit deputies whose overtime was paid by Epstein, who wore suits and checked in any guests. Later, the Sheriff's Office said these guest logs were destroyed per the department's records retention rules, although the Stockade visitor logs were not. Epstein was allowed to use his own driver to drive him between jail and his office and other appointments.

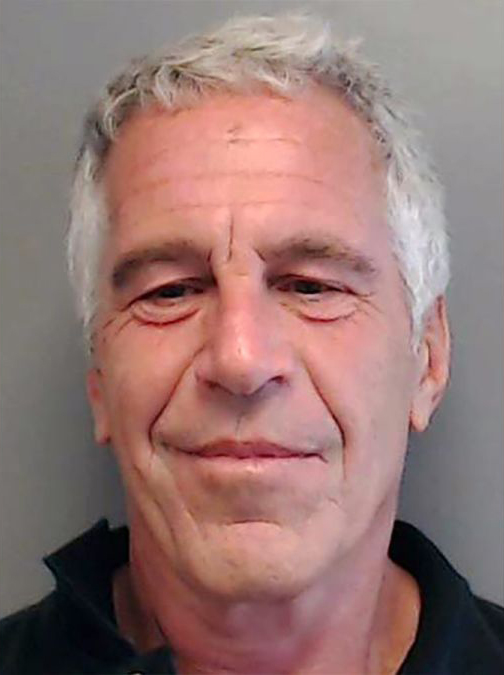
Epstein pictured in 2013, photographed for the sex offender registry

Epstein served 13 months of his 18-month sentence before being released on July 22, 2009, and placed on a year of probation on house arrest until August 2010. His early release after 13 of 18 months served was because he provided information regarding Bear Stearns executives Ralph Cioffi and Matthew Tannin, whose conduct was scrutinized by the SDNY court in In re Bear Stearns Companies, Inc. Securities, Derivative and ERISA Litigation, before the bank was acquired by JPMorgan Chase.

While on probation, he was allowed numerous trips on his corporate jet to his residences in Manhattan and the U.S. Virgin Islands. He was allowed long shopping trips and walks around Palm Beach "for exercise". One woman has said he began raping her in the summer of 2009 when she was 18, recently arrived from Uzbekistan, having been recruited by a modeling agent with ties to him. After a contested hearing in January 2011, and an appeal, he stayed registered in New York State as a "level three" (high risk of repeat offense) sex offender, a lifelong designation. At that hearing, the Manhattan assistant district attorney, Jennifer Gaffney, argued unsuccessfully that the level should be reduced to a low-risk "level one" and was chided by the judge.

==== Reactions ====
After the accusations against Epstein became public, several people and institutions returned donations that they had received from him, including Eliot Spitzer, Bill Richardson, and the Palm Beach Police Department. Harvard University announced it would not return any money. Various charitable donations that Epstein had made to finance children's education were also questioned.

=== Interim developments and media scrutiny ===
Epstein's former house manager, Alfredo Rodriguez, was sentenced to 18 months' incarceration on June 18, 2010, after being convicted on an obstruction charge for failing to turn over to police, and subsequently trying to sell, a journal in which he had recorded Epstein's activities. FBI special agent Christina Pryor reviewed the material and agreed it was information "that would have been extremely useful in investigating and prosecuting the case, including names and contact information of material witnesses and additional victims."

Matthew Menchel, the criminal prosecutor at the Miami U.S. Attorney's office, later maintained a personal relationship with Epstein. Menchel had apparently personal meetings with Epstein in 2011, 2012, 2013, and 2017.

Virginia Giuffre was among the first of Epstein's accusers to reveal her identity to the public, having done so in 2011.

==== Miami Herald article ====
External videos
- "Documentary: Who is Jeffrey Epstein, accused of sexually abusing teen girls?". Miami Herald via YouTube. November 29, 2018.

In November 2018, Julie Brown published a three-part series in the Miami Herald, after she identified 80 victims and located about 60 of them. Brown argued that Epstein had not faced justice due to a plea deal, which she described as a "deal of a lifetime".

Virginia Roberts Giuffre alleged that Epstein had access to girls through a modeling agency. The article scrutinized Epstein's ties to Jean-Luc Brunel, who ran MC2 model management, and scouted models from Brazil and other South American countries, former Soviet countries, and Europe.

Brown's article prompted interest among New York authorities to reopen investigations into Epstein. U.S. Manhattan attorney Geoffrey Berman, stated "our investigation was assisted by some excellent investigative journalism."

=== Second set of criminal charges (2019) ===
==== Sex trafficking charges ====
U.S. v. Jeffrey Epstein indictment

On July 6, 2019, Epstein was arrested when he returned to the U.S. from France by the FBI-NYPD Crimes Against Children Task Force at Teterboro Airport in New Jersey on charges of sex trafficking during the years 2002 to 2005. He was jailed at the Metropolitan Correctional Center in New York City.

Investigators seized Epstein's devices at his homes in New York, Florida and the U.S. Virgin Islands. They found CDs, photographs and a videotape containing nude images of females, some who "seemed as if they might be minors".

According to a memo published four days after his arrest, the search of his New York townhouse turned up evidence of sex trafficking and "hundreds—and perhaps thousands—of sexually suggestive photographs of fully—or partially—nude females." In a locked safe, discs were found with labels: "Young [Name] + [Name]", "Misc nudes 1", and "Girl pics nude". USA Today noted that although investigators were still reviewing the material, one attorney said that his client was underage when some photos were taken.

FBI investigators later determined that one device contained between 15 and 20 images depicting child sexual abuse material (CSAM), but that the material had been downloaded from the internet, and not produced by Epstein himself. According to a memo later sent to the FBI by assistant U.S. Attorney Maurene Comey, "No videos or photos showed Epstein victims being sexually abused, none showed any males with any of the nude females, and none contained evidence implicating anyone other than Epstein and Maxwell". Comey stated they "would have pursued any leads" generated but "we did not, however, locate any such videos".

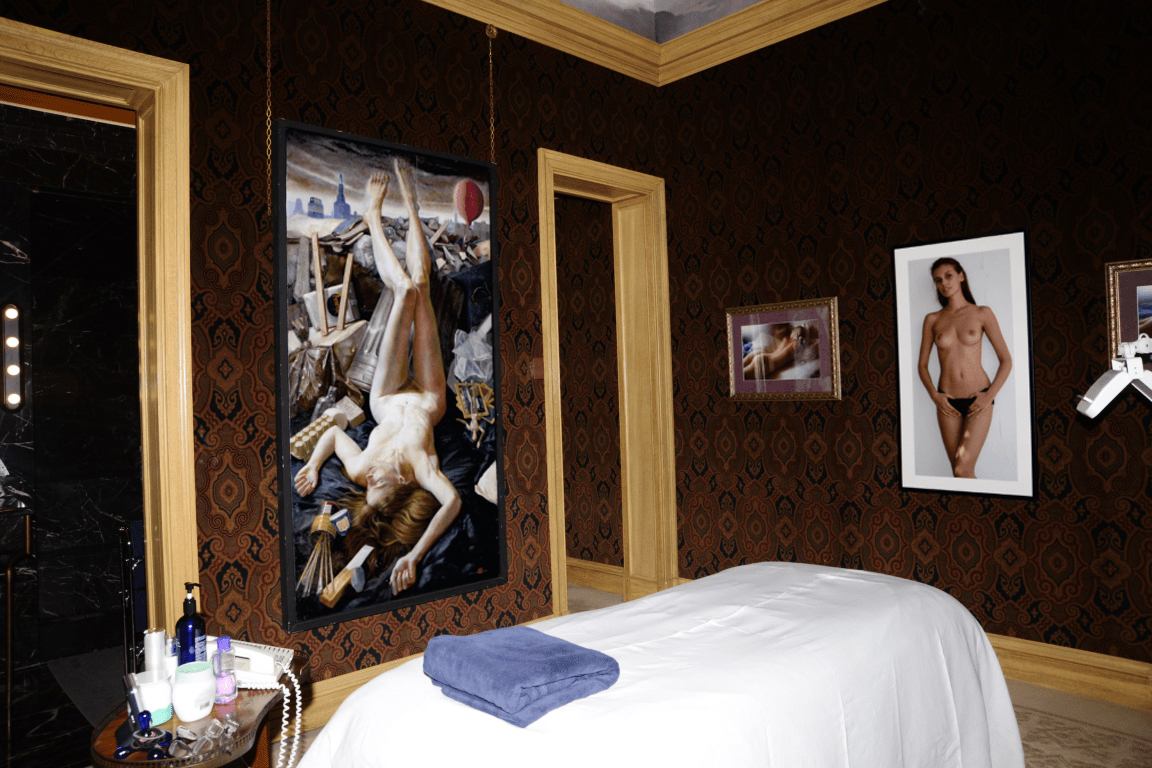
Massage room with a massage table in Epstein's NYC townhouse in 2019

Also found in the safe were $70,000 in cash, 48 diamonds, and a fraudulent Austrian passport, which expired in 1987, that had Epstein's photo but another name. The passport had numerous entrance and exit stamps, including entrance stamps that showed the use of the passport to enter France, Spain, the United Kingdom, and Saudi Arabia in the 1980s. The passport showed his place of residence as Saudi Arabia. According to his lawyers, Epstein acquired the fake passport –because as "affluent member of the Jewish faith" he was in danger of being kidnapped abroad – thus it allowed him to conceal his identity. Epstein's lawyers stated that he never used the passport, and the stamps predated his acquisition.

On July 8, prosecutors with the Public Corruption Unit of the Southern District of New York under Geoffrey Berman charged him with sex trafficking and conspiracy to traffic minors for sex. The grand jury indictment alleges that "dozens" of underage girls were brought into Epstein's mansions for sexual encounters. Judge Kenneth Marra was to decide whether the non-prosecution agreement that protected Epstein from the more serious charges should still stand.

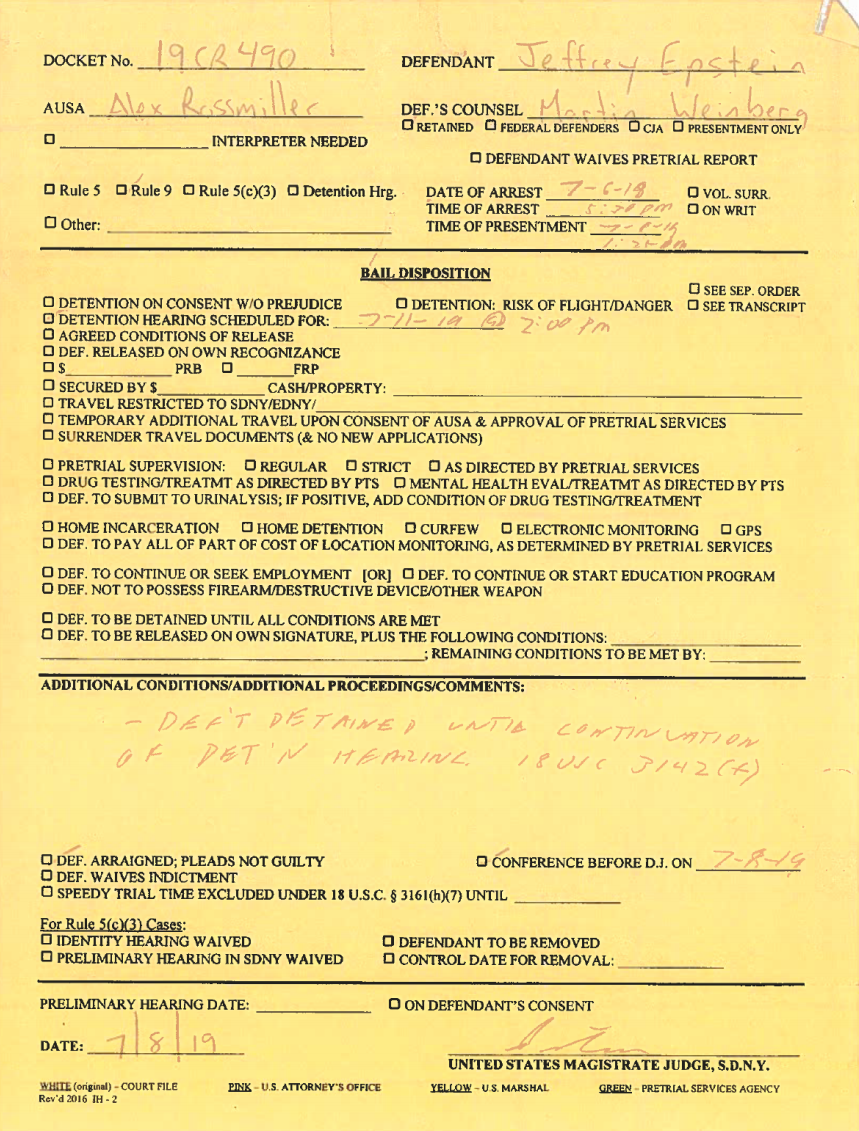
Federal paperwork regarding Epstein being denied bail

Epstein requested to be released on bond, offering to post $100 million with the condition that he would also submit to house arrest in his New York City mansion. U.S. district judge Richard M. Berman denied the request on July 18, saying that Epstein posed a danger to the public and a serious flight risk to avoid prosecution. Epstein legally was presumed innocent of all charged offenses until proven guilty, but he died before a trial could ever commence. On August 29, 2019, 19 days after Epstein was found dead in his jail cell, the charges were dismissed and the case against Epstein was closed by Judge Berman. Prosecutors stated they would continue an investigation for potential co-conspirators.

==== Alleged Acosta comment ====
On July 9, 2019, the Daily Beast published an article citing an anonymous former White House official, who alleged that during 2017, Alexander Acosta, the U.S. Attorney who had overseen Epstein's plea deal, had allegedly stated to interviewers of President Donald Trump's first transition team, "I was told Epstein 'belonged to intelligence' and to 'leave it alone'", and that Epstein was "above his pay grade". This story has generated many theories about the connections between Epstein and intelligence organizations, built up and promoted by authors like Whitney Webb. Journalist Mark Hoffer says that this alleged comment from Acosta came from an anonymous source and has been denied by Acosta under oath. Also, according to Hoffer, "Additionally, none of the subjects of a DOJ investigation regarding Epstein's 2008 plea deal believed it to be the case that Epstein was an intelligence asset."

==== Investigation in France ====
The prosecutor's office in Paris, France, opened a preliminary investigation into Epstein on August 23, 2019, after Yael Mellul wrote to the Paris prosecutor to report of an alleged international pedophile network involving Epstein. The investigation aimed to identify potential victims of sexual assault under and over the age of 15, in France and elsewhere against French citizens. An associate of Epstein, modeling agent Jean-Luc Brunel, was arrested. Le Monde reported that eleven women accused Brunel of sexual assault in that case, which was closed after he died by suicide in Paris's La Santé Prison, in February 2022.

=== Civil cases ===
Epstein faced over a dozen civil lawsuits from accusers and associates while he was living, starting in 2007. Following his death in 2019, more than a dozen additional lawsuits were filed against his estate.

In October 2007, transgender model Ava Cordero alleged that Epstein had abused her and filed suit accordingly; however, it was dismissed, with press at the time instead making allegations about Cordero's mental health and mocking her gender identity.

==== Later disclosed allegations in lawsuits ====
Allegations in a civil suit described an occasion where three 12-year-old girls from France were flown in for Epstein's birthday, sexually abused by the financier, and then flown back the following day.

== Alleged trafficking ring ==
=== Trafficking ring allegations ===
In 2008, Epstein was convicted in Florida for soliciting a minor and served 13 months. According to police and prosecutors involved in his first criminal investigation, there were no reports from victims that Epstein's high-profile associates were involved. In a 2020 Office of Professional Responsibility (OPR) report, federal prosecutor Marie Villafaña said "none of the victims that we spoke with ever talked about any other men being involved in abusing them. It was only Jeffrey Epstein". According to the OPR report, allegations implicating Epstein's famous contacts emerged years later.

In 2009, Virginia Giuffre alleged she was "sexually exploited by Epstein's adult male peers, including royalty" while a minor when working as Epstein's personal masseuse. The 2009 suit, filed anonymously, stated that "In addition to being continually exploited to satisfy defendant's [Epstein] every sexual whim, [Ms Giuffre] was also required to be sexually exploited by defendant's adult male peers, including "royalty, politicians, academicians, businessmen and or other professional and personal acquaintances." At the time, she named Epstein and Maxwell but did not identify any of the men.

In the 2010s, Virginia Giuffre alleged in lawsuits and media interviews, that Epstein had run a sex trafficking ring and "lent out" girls to numerous powerful men in the early 2000s, and directed her to have sex with them. She was interviewed by the FBI in 2011 and again in 2019. In 2026, documents from Epstein's 2019 investigation were declassified. FBI investigators were unable to corroborate Giuffre's allegation that Epstein was operating a ring in which he "lent out" girls to powerful men. During interviews, numerous women corroborated evidence of Epstein abusing them, but "no other victim has described being expressly directed by either Maxwell or Epstein to engage in sexual activity with other men".

When the FBI interviewed two of the victims that Giuffre had claimed were also "lent out", those women denied having such experiences. The FBI memo said Giuffre gave "shifting accounts" and "engaged in a continuous stream of public interviews about her allegations, many of which have included sensationalized if not demonstrably inaccurate characterizations of her experiences". It also said Giuffre publicly misrepresented her interactions with the FBI.

The 2019 FBI memo also states that Giuffre's early draft memoir made mention of Epstein's lawyer Alan Dershowitz without allegations of sexual activity, but in 2014, Giuffre raised trafficking allegations. Unsealed emails show that in 2011, Giuffre was communicating with DailyMail reporter Sharon Churcher, who she asked to help create a list of Epstein associates to include in her memoir. In one exchange, Churcher said "Don't forget Alan Dershowitz ... JE's buddy and lawyer -good name for your pitch ... We all suspect Alan is a pedo and tho no proof on that, you probably met him when he was hanging out with JE." In 2014, Giuffre filed a lawsuit alleging that Epstein had trafficked her to figures including Alan Dershowitz, who she alleged had raped her on 6 occasions. Dershowitz denied her allegations and countersued her, alleging she was fabricating allegations to "extort money" from Epstein associates. In 2022, Giuffre withdrew her legal action against Dershowitz and said she "may have made a mistake" in identifying him.

=== Alleged tapes and blackmail operation ===
When police raided his Palm Beach residence in 2006, two hidden cameras were present in his home, one in the garage, and another in his office. Police had helped to install these cameras in 2003, (Note: Although Patterson's Filthy Rich states this occurred in 2004, primary sources indicate this occurred in 2003. Epstein's attorney's 2006 memo refers to hidden cameras being installed in 2003. Additionally, in a 2005 police incident report, detective Joe Recarey states he met with Epstein in 2003 and discussed the hidden cameras used to catch Alessi.) when Epstein complained about an employee stealing cash and a gun from him. After an investigation, police identified the thief as Epstein's handyman Juan Alessi. Epstein asked the PBPD to call off the investigation when Alessi agreed to repay him. Police found images from the camera showing several women standing in the office, such as his assistants Sarah Kellen and Nadia Marcinko.

Virginia Giuffre later alleged that in the early 2000s, Epstein had secretly recorded her having sex with powerful men for blackmail purposes, and in 2015, accused the FBI of possessing alleged videos in a "major cover-up". In 2016, Sarah Ransome, who served as a witness for Giuffre, told a reporter that she had copies of sex tapes filmed by Epstein for blackmail purposes, that included Donald Trump, Bill Clinton, Richard Branson and Andrew Mountbatten-Windsor. However, Ransome admitted to fabricating her claim in 2019.

In a 2014 email exchange, Epstein instructed a staff member to purchase and install motion-activated hidden cameras at his Palm Beach residence, with the aide indicating they would be concealed in tissue boxes. According to The Telegraph, footage captured on covert cameras was "largely innocuous and unlikely to constitute compromising material. They appear to have been filmed in the living room of Epstein's Palm Beach home, not in bedrooms or elsewhere".

Following Epstein's death in August 2019, reports of there being cameras in his homes circulated in the media. Vanity Fair reported claims of a former friend of Ghislaine Maxwell, who said that Epstein's island was "completely wired" with cameras, and speculated this was for blackmail purposes. In November 2019, Maria Farmer, an artist who worked for Epstein in 1996, said that Epstein had shown her a hidden room in his New York mansion where he had teams of men monitoring rooms in the home using "pinhole cameras", including the bedrooms and toilets. In 2018, Epstein told New York Times reporter off the record, that he held incriminating information about powerful people, including information about their sexual proclivities and recreational drug use. In July 2021, Rolling Stone reported that multiple sources, including former arms dealers and former intelligence figures, suggested that Epstein recorded influential individuals in compromising situations. In 2022, Courtney Soerensen alleged that in 1988, Epstein sexually groped her in France while a videographer filmed the encounter. In 2025, Marina Lacerda, an alleged minor victim recruited by Epstein in 2002, described his New York home as being full of cameras with an office in the front of the house dedicated to them.

Federal investigators seized Epstein's devices during 2019 raids on his homes. Authorities found CDs, photographs and tapes, some labeled "young [name] + [name]", and depicting girls who "seemed as if they might be minors". The FBI investigation, made public in 2026, found that none of the photos or videos depicted victims being sexually abused by Epstein or others. Investigators found between 15 and 20 images depicting child sexual abuse material (CSAM), but they determined that these were downloaded from the internet, not produced by Epstein.

In 2019, two prominent lawyers representing Epstein's accusers, David Boies and J. Stanley Pottinger, were contacted by a man purporting to be a hacker, who went by the pseudonym Patrick Kessler. Kessler claimed to possess sex tapes of Epstein and high profile men with victims, and told the lawyers he wanted the men to face justice. In message exchanges, Pottinger instead proposed using the videos to extract large financial settlements from the men and keeping the tapes private. In other exchanges, he "described hypothetical plans in which the lawyers would pocket up to 40 percent of the settlements and could extract money from wealthy men by flipping from representing victims to representing their alleged abusers". The tapes, however, did not exist. Kessler had constructed an elaborate story, and the messages were then provided to the New York Times. Boies denied involvement, but declined to condemn Pottinger.

=== Alleged adult victims ===
Following Epstein's 2008 conviction, Epstein reportedly began pursuing relationships with young adult women over the age of 18. According to victims lawyer Brad Edwards, Epstein "deliberately shifted to women over 18 to use their age as cover" for what he argues was a sex trafficking operation. Many of the adult women Epstein pursued were fashion models from Europe and Russia.

Emails released in the Epstein Files identified one such woman as Svetlana Pozhidaeva, who, while an adult, began working an assistant to the sex offender from 2008 until his death in 2019. Previously unredacted emails showed she was gathering information on young women and models, and sending it to Epstein. Her name has since been redacted by the Department of Justice. According to lawyers speaking to the Wall Street Journal, Pozhidaeva is an example of an adult victim, who was coerced into assisting Epstein's trafficking. She is represented by a major Epstein victims lawyer, Brad Edwards, and denies allegations that she or her father were Russian spies.

An investigation from the German newspapers Der Spiegel and ZDF revealed that modeling scout Daniel Siad had introduced Epstein to a 22-year-old German woman referred to as "Michele" who has been missing since 2015.

According to Safdar, redaction failures of emails in the files gave "ammunition" to online commentators, who cited friendly, warm or grateful messages between adult women and Epstein as evidence they were "willing participants", or as "evidence of complicity or consent". The lawyer Moira Penza argued against the idea that adult women "could have just left" Epstein, as she believes co-dependency means "consent just becomes irrelevant. There really is no way to consent".

In 2025, a woman of Russian origin filed a class action lawsuit against Bank of America, alleging that while an adult, the bank had enabled Epstein to traffic and control her life between 2011 until 2019. As of March 2026, the lawsuit has been tentatively settled.

=== Alleged forced pregnancies and stolen babies ===
The release of the Epstein Files contained pages from a woman's journal, submitted to the Department of Justice by her lawyer, alleging that Epstein had forced her to bear several children in an "impregnation game". Her journals included images of sonograms, and entries in which she wrote that Epstein was trying to create the "perfect gene pool". She wrote her baby was taken shortly after giving birth: "she was born, I heard her cries!... I saw this tiny head and body in between the doctor's hands. Ghislaine said she was beautiful. Where is she?".

In April 2026, a judge ruled that the woman had falsified the sonogram images in her journals. The determination occurred in the course of a Jane Doe lawsuit she had brought against Leon Black. The woman's lawyer, Jeanne Christensen, was also sanctioned for repeatedly lying to the court. In a proceeding, Doe's claim of being an Epstein victim also came under question, pertaining to victim settlements from JP Morgan. Black's lawyers have urged authorities to investigate the woman for fraud on the court. According to the New York Times, there is no evidence that Epstein ever fathered any children.

== Personal life ==
In 2003, Bloomberg journalist David Bank spoke on Little St. James with Epstein in a 5-hour long interview, which Bank left unpublished prior to Epstein's death. In 2017, Epstein spoke in interviews, over the course of more than one hundred hours, with journalist Michael Wolff, which began to be released in November 2024, as part of Wolff's Fire and Fury podcast.

Epstein had an interest in eugenics and transhumanist ideas such as cryonics.

== Death ==
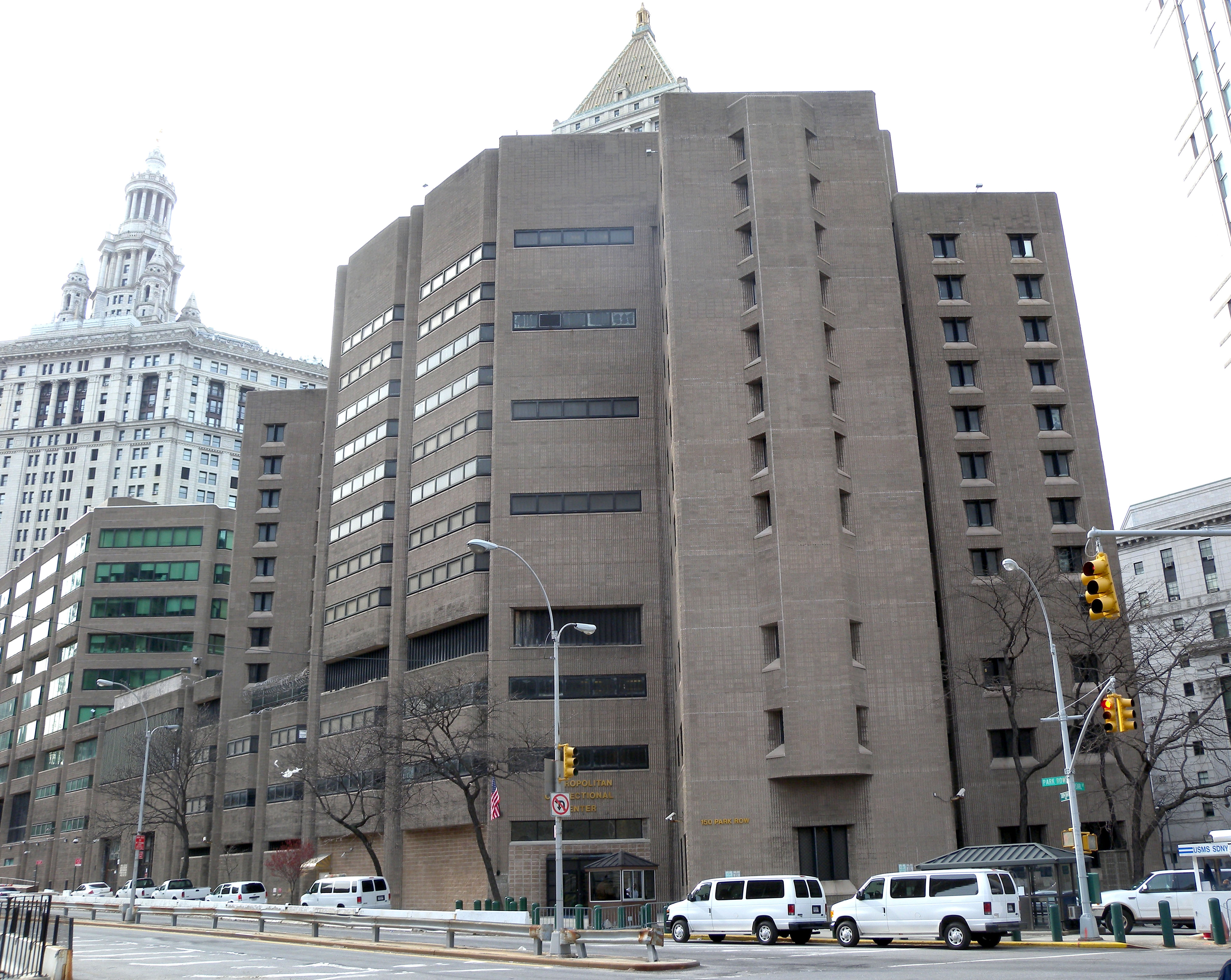
At the time of his death, Epstein was being held at the Metropolitan Correctional Center, awaiting trial for sex trafficking.

On July 23, 2019, Epstein was found injured and semiconscious at 1:30 a.m. EDT on the floor of his cell at the Metropolitan Correctional Center, New York (MCC), with marks around his neck. His cellmate, Nicholas Tartaglione, was questioned about Epstein's condition. Tartaglione denied having any knowledge of what happened. Correctional staff suspected attempted suicide, but did not rule out the possibility it was staged or assault by another inmate. After that incident, he was placed on suicide watch. Six days later, on July 29, 2019, Epstein was taken off suicide watch and placed in a special housing unit with another inmate.

When Epstein was placed in the special housing unit, the jail informed the Justice Department that he would have a cellmate, and that a guard would look into the cell every 30 minutes. These procedures were not followed on the night of his death. Epstein's cellmate was transferred out on August 9, 2019, but no one took his place. Later in the evening, contrary to the jail's normal procedure, Epstein was not checked every 30 minutes. The two guards assigned to check his unit that night fell asleep and did not check on him for three hours; the guards falsified related records. The two cameras in front of Epstein's cell were claimed to have malfunctioned that night.

Epstein was found dead in his cell at 6:30 a.m. on August 10, 2019. Emergency responders were called and he was taken to a hospital. On August 10, the Federal Bureau of Prisons and U.S. attorney general William Barr called the death an apparent suicide, although no final determination had been made. The U.S. Department of Justice's Inspector General's investigation report released in 2023, criticized jail officials for repeated "negligence, misconduct, and outright job performance failures". It denied the suggestion that what happened was anything other than a suicide. In May 2025, the FBI Deputy Director Dan Bongino stated that the surveillance footage from the night of Epstein's death shows Epstein alone in his cell, with no evidence of outside involvement, reaffirming the official ruling of suicide.

=== Autopsy ===
Epstein's body moved from New York hospital to medical examiner's office

An autopsy was performed on August 11, 2019. It appeared likely that Epstein had thrown himself violently off the cell's top bunk, which would explain the damage he suffered, other than strangulation. The preliminary result of the autopsy found that Epstein sustained breaks in his neck bones, including the hyoid bone. Such breaks of the hyoid bone can occur from those who hang themselves from a substantial height, e.g. jumping from a chair into the rope, but are more common in victims of strangulation.

Barbara Sampson, the Chief Medical Examiner of the City of New York, ruled Epstein's death a suicide by hanging on August 15, 2019. The medical examiner, according to Epstein's defense counsel, only saw nine minutes of footage from one security camera to help her arrive at her conclusion. Epstein's defense lawyers were not satisfied with the conclusion and said the evidence concerning Epstein's death was "far more consistent" with murder. Michael Baden, an independent pathologist hired by the Epstein estate, observed the autopsy. In October 2019, Baden said that Epstein had experienced a number of injuries—among them a broken bone in his neck—that "are extremely unusual in suicidal hangings and could occur much more commonly in homicidal strangulation."

In November 2026, forensic medicine professor Michael Freeman, editor-in-chief of the Journal of Forensic and Legal Medicine and a fellow of the Royal College of Pathologists, presented the findings of a yearlong examination of previously unpublished autopsy records and photographs provided by Epstein's brother. Working with Swedish forensic pathologist Anders Eriksson and Itiel Dror, a researcher specializing in bias in forensic decision-making, Freeman used three-dimensional modeling to reconstruct Epstein's injuries, which focused on the deep, ragged and branching Y-shaped ligature mark on his neck, which he said was inconsistent with the smooth, upward-sloping mark expected in a hanging. He also focused on deep hemorrhaging in the left shoulder and cuts on the mouth. He concluded that the injuries were more consistent with homicidal strangulation from behind following an assault and struggle.

=== Final will ===
On August 18, 2019, it was reported that Epstein had signed his last will and testament on August 8, two weeks after being found injured in his cell and two days before his death. Until this time, Epstein had been depositing money in other inmates' commissary accounts to avoid being attacked. Epstein's will left $50 million in cash and most of his property to girlfriend Karyna Shuliak, $50 million to lawyer Darren Indyke, $25 million to accountant Richard Kahn, $10 million to pilot Larry Visoski, $10 million to Ghislaine Maxwell, and $10 million to his brother Mark. Other female employees were to get a million dollars each. The trust's enforceability remained uncertain. As of February 2026, Kahn and Indyke control Epstein's estate. Due to ongoing lawsuits and victim settlements, Epstein's beneficiaries will only receive a share of what is left after these are resolved.

=== Burial ===
Following the autopsy, Epstein's body was claimed by his brother Mark. Epstein's body was interred in an unmarked crypt next to those of his parents at the I.J. Morris Star of David Cemetery in Palm Beach, Florida on September 5, 2019. The names of his parents were removed to prevent vandalism.

=== Investigations ===
Attorney General Barr ordered an investigation by the U.S. Department of Justice Office of the Inspector General in addition to the FBI investigation, saying he was "appalled" by Epstein's death in federal custody. Two days later Barr said there had been "serious irregularities" in the prison's handling of Epstein, promising "there will be accountability."

CCTV footage released in July 2025 showing part of a common area within the Metropolitan Correctional Center where Epstein was being held. A minute is missing from the footage, where the clock jumps from 11:58:58 to 12:00:00.

The president of the Council of Prison Locals C-33 E. Young, stated that prisons "can't ever stop anyone who is persistent on killing themselves." The previous inmate suicide in that MCC facility was in 1998. Union leader Young said it was unclear if there was video of Epstein's hanging or direct observations by jail officials. He said that while cameras are ubiquitous, he did not believe the interior of inmates' cells was within their range.

President Trump and Attorney General Pam Bondi briefly mentioning Epstein during a cabinet meeting on July 8, 2025.

Epstein's attorneys asked district judge Richard M. Berman, to probe the death, alleging they could provide evidence the incident resulting in his death was "far more consistent with assault" than suicide. At least one camera in the hallway outside Epstein's cell had footage that was unusable, though other usable footage was recorded in the area. Two cameras that malfunctioned in front of Epstein's cell were sent to an FBI lab for examination. Federal prosecutors subpoenaed 20 correctional officers concerning the cause of Epstein's death.

On November 19, 2019, prosecutors charged guards Michael Thomas and Tova Noel with creating false records, and conspiracy, after footage revealed that Epstein had, against regulation, been in his cell unchecked for eight hours prior to being found dead. On May 22, 2021, the guards admitted they falsified records but were spared jail time under a deal. On May 25, they pleaded guilty to falsifying records and conspiracy to defraud the U.S. They were sentenced to six months of supervisory release and 100 hours of community service.

In December 2023, judge Loretta Preska ordered a list with names of 170 Epstein associates to be unsealed on January 1, 2024. Anyone on the list had until January 1 to appeal to have their name removed. In February 2025, the second Trump administration's attorney general Pam Bondi stated that Epstein's client list was "sitting on my desk" for review, and in June, Elon Musk alleged Trump was in the files. In July, Bondi and FBI head Kash Patel announced there was no list, no evidence Epstein had blackmailed anyone, that Epstein had killed himself, and released footage showing a partial view of a common area and obscured view of the stairs leading to Epstein's cell block—though that footage was not independently verified. A minute was found missing, where the clock jumps from 11:58:58 to 12:00:00. An investigation found the video had been modified despite the FBI claim it was raw, and three minutes were cut out of the video. On July 15, 2025, Representative Thomas Massie submitted House Resolution 119–581, co-sponsored by Ro Khanna, to force the Department of Justice to release the Epstein files. They announced on August 12 they would bring victims to the Capitol on September 3.

On August 25, 2025, the House Oversight Committee issued subpoenas to Bill Clinton, Hillary Clinton and former attorneys general Loretta Lynch, Eric Holder, William Barr, Merrick Garland, Jeff Sessions, and Alberto Gonzales. Acosta testified in October about his plea deal with Epstein, where he defended his decision to pursue a state-level case due to perceived weaknesses in federal evidence, and denied knowledge of Epstein's extensive financial crimes. These claims were disputed by Democrats, highlighting contradictions with later evidence of his office investigating financial aspects and calling his testimony non-credible.

On September 4, 2025, James O'Keefe published an exposé on Deputy Chief Joseph Schnitt of DOJ Special Operations, in which the latter said there were "thousands and thousands of pages of files" relating to Epstein and the DOJ would "redact every Republican or conservative person in those files", while "[leaving] all the liberal, Democratic people in those files". Epstein's brother Mark alleged the same, stating he had heard from a "good source" that a team in Virginia was "sanitizing" and "scrubbing the files to take Republican names out." On November 12, Adelita Grijalva gave the final 218th signature to Massie's discharge position, forcing the creation of the Epstein Files Transparency Act. It requires the attorney general to "make publicly available" all files pertaining to the prosecution of Epstein within 30 days, and give the Judiciary Committees an unredacted "list of all government officials and politically exposed persons" named in the files.

== Estate and victim settlements ==
=== Epstein estate settlements ===
Epstein's estate was valued around $600 million at the time of his death. His estate has become the focus of extensive litigation and settlements. Epstein's estate created a victims' compensation program that paid about $121 million to 136 claimants. The estate later paid an additional $49 million to settle a victims lawsuit. In 2026, the estate paid $35 million to settle another victims lawsuit. In 2022, the estate also settled a lawsuit with the government of the U.S. Virgin Islands to resolve civil claims that Epstein used the territory for trafficking, paying $105 million and agreeing to share proceeds from the sale of his private islands.

=== Bank lawsuits ===
In November 2023, JPMorgan Chase agreed to pay a settlement of $290 million to resolve a class-action lawsuit brought by Epstein accusers, who alleged the bank enabled his abuse by continuing to provide him their financial services. JP Morgan did not admit liability as part of the settlement. The lawyers received 30% of the settlement.

Around the same time, Deutsche Bank agreed to pay $75 million to settle a similar lawsuit brought by Epstein accusers concerning the period when Epstein was a client of the bank, between 2013 and 2018. JPMorgan later paid $75 million to settle claims by the government of the U.S. Virgin Islands related to allegations that the bank had enabled Epstein's trafficking.

In 2025, victim lawsuits were also filed against Bank of America and the Bank of New York Mellon (BNY), alleging these banks enabled Epstein's trafficking. Both banks said they would fight the lawsuits, with BNY describing the lawsuit as "meritless". In February 2026, BNY won a dismissal of all claims in the lawsuit. 4 out of 6 claims against Bank of America were dismissed, with two proceeding.

== Epstein files releases ==
The Epstein files are a U.S. government release of millions of documents pertaining to investigations of Epstein.

In September 2025, the House Oversight Committee released a 2003 birthday album created for Epstein's 50th birthday, titled The First Fifty Years. The album contained letters and drawings from various associates. One letter in the collection was attributed to Donald Trump, although Trump has denied writing or signing it and his legal team has challenged its authenticity.

In January 2026, the Justice Department published about three million further pages, together with some 2,000 videos and 180,000 images, in compliance with the Epstein Files Transparency Act. The release drew criticism over redaction failures. The department published dozens of unredacted nude images of young women, which were largely removed after The New York Times notified it, and attorneys for survivors said that the names of victims who had never previously been linked publicly to Epstein appeared unredacted.

== Aftermath and legacy ==
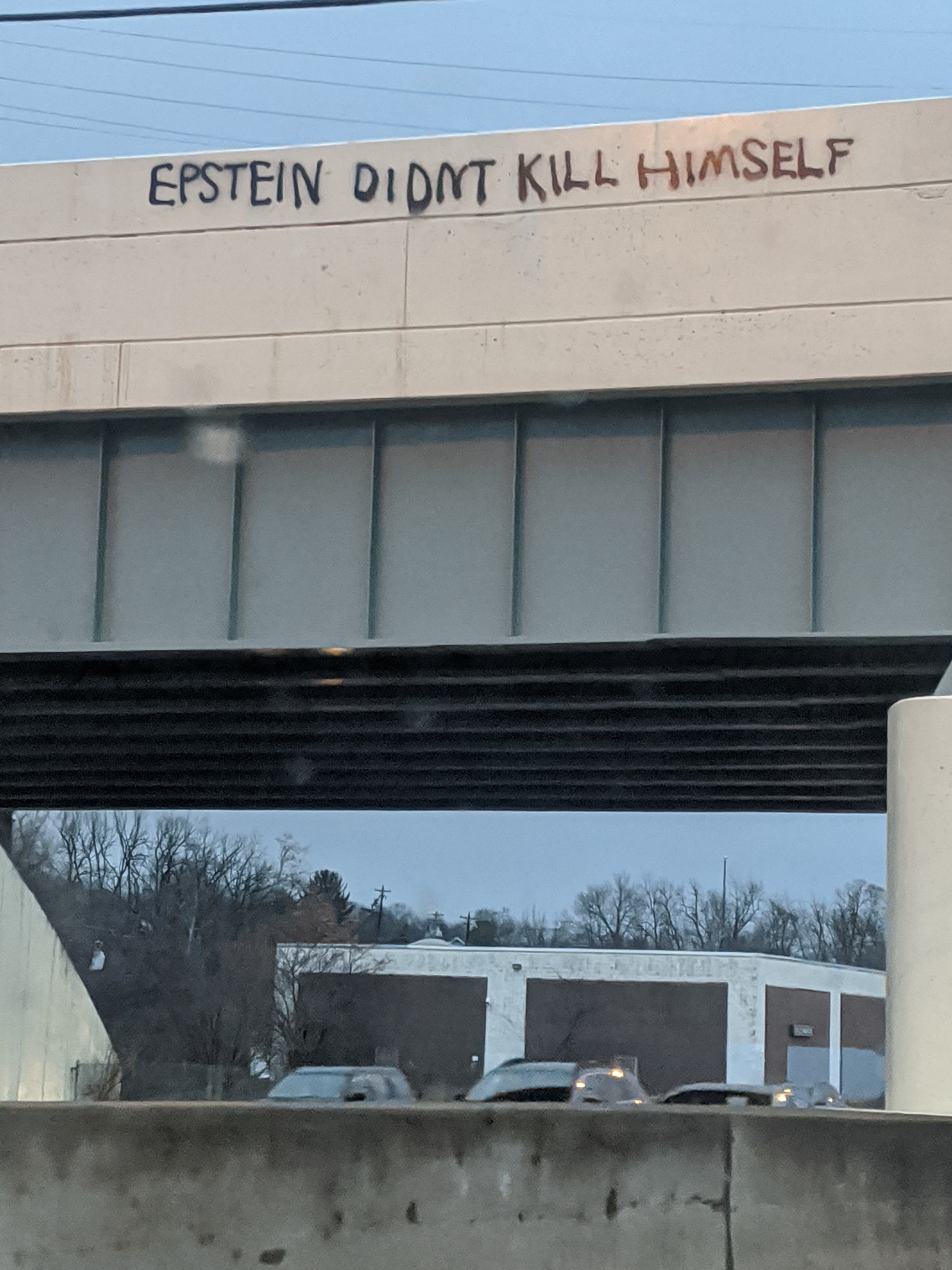
Graffiti featuring the phrase on an overpass on Interstate 71 in Cincinnati

=== Public reaction and institutional scrutiny ===
Epstein's death in 2019 fueled widespread controversy and debate. The belief that he was the victim of murder in service of a wider cover-up subsequently became a popular internet meme and conspiracy theory.

The partial release of the Epstein files by the U.S. Department of Justice in response to the Epstein Files Transparency Act prompted renewed public and media scrutiny of the case and contributed to a marked shift in public discourse about elite accountability. Legal scholars, investigative journalists, and human rights experts described the disclosures as intensifying scrutiny of longstanding institutional failures which had allowed Epstein to avoid accountability, despite repeated allegations. Commentators noted that claims concerning Epstein's extensive connections within the political, financial, and social elite–which had long been dismissed by many officials and media figures as speculative or unsubstantiated–were reassessed following the document release. The case has been frequently cited as illustrative of broader class-based disparities in law enforcement and prosecutorial decision-making, and as an example of systemic corruption and elite impunity within the criminal justice system, particularly regarding the treatment of wealthy or well-connected individuals.

=== Victims' later deaths ===
At least three women who are confirmed or alleged to have been abused by Epstein have died of drug overdoses or by suicide. In 2018, Leigh "Skye" Patrick, who was sexually abused by Epstein at the age of 16, died of an accidental drug overdose in a Florida motel. In 2023, Carolyn Andriano, a victim of Epstein who testified at the trial of Ghislaine Maxwell, died of an accidental drug overdose, also in a Florida hotel. In 2025, Virginia Giuffre died by suicide at her home in Australia at the age of 41.

=== Artworks ===
On July 1, 2020, a statue of Epstein was left outside the City Hall in Albuquerque, New Mexico as a satirical commentary on opposition to the removal of Confederate monuments and memorials. A sculpture of Epstein frolicking with Trump titled Best Friends Forever was produced by an anonymous art group aliased "The Secret Handshake" in protest of their relationship. Its September 2025 debut at the National Mall made national news when the United States Park Police assigned with protecting the sculpture dismantled it.

=== Documentaries ===
As of October 2019, HBO was creating a limited series on Epstein's life and death to be directed and executive produced by Adam McKay. Sony Pictures Television is additionally developing a miniseries based on Epstein's life. The Netflix documentary series Jeffrey Epstein: Filthy Rich premiered in May 2020. The Lifetime documentary Surviving Jeffrey Epstein premiered in August 2020.

== See also ==
- Logos Centrs pedophilia case, a criminal scandal and child sexual abuse case that surfaced in Latvia in 1999
- John David Norman, American pedophile and child sex trafficker (1927–2011)
