= Towers Financial Corporation =

Fraudulent American debt collection agency

- Type: Debt collection agency
- Founded: Early 1970s in Delaware
- Founder: Steven Hoffenberg
- Fate: Filed for bankruptcy protection (March 1993)
- Headquarters: New York City, United States
- Key people: Steven Hoffenberg, Jeffrey Epstein, Mitchell Brater, and Michael Rosoff

Towers Financial Corporation was a debt collection agency based in Manhattan in New York City. Between 1988 and 1993, Towers Financial ran a Ponzi scheme that was the largest financial fraud in American history prior to Bernie Madoff's being uncovered.

== History ==
The company, founded in the early 1970s in downtown Manhattan and incorporated in Delaware, was a debt collection agency that paid a penny on the dollar for loans that sellers viewed as worthless, focusing on debts that people owed to hospitals, banks, and phone companies. Steven Hoffenberg was its founder, CEO, President, and Chairman.

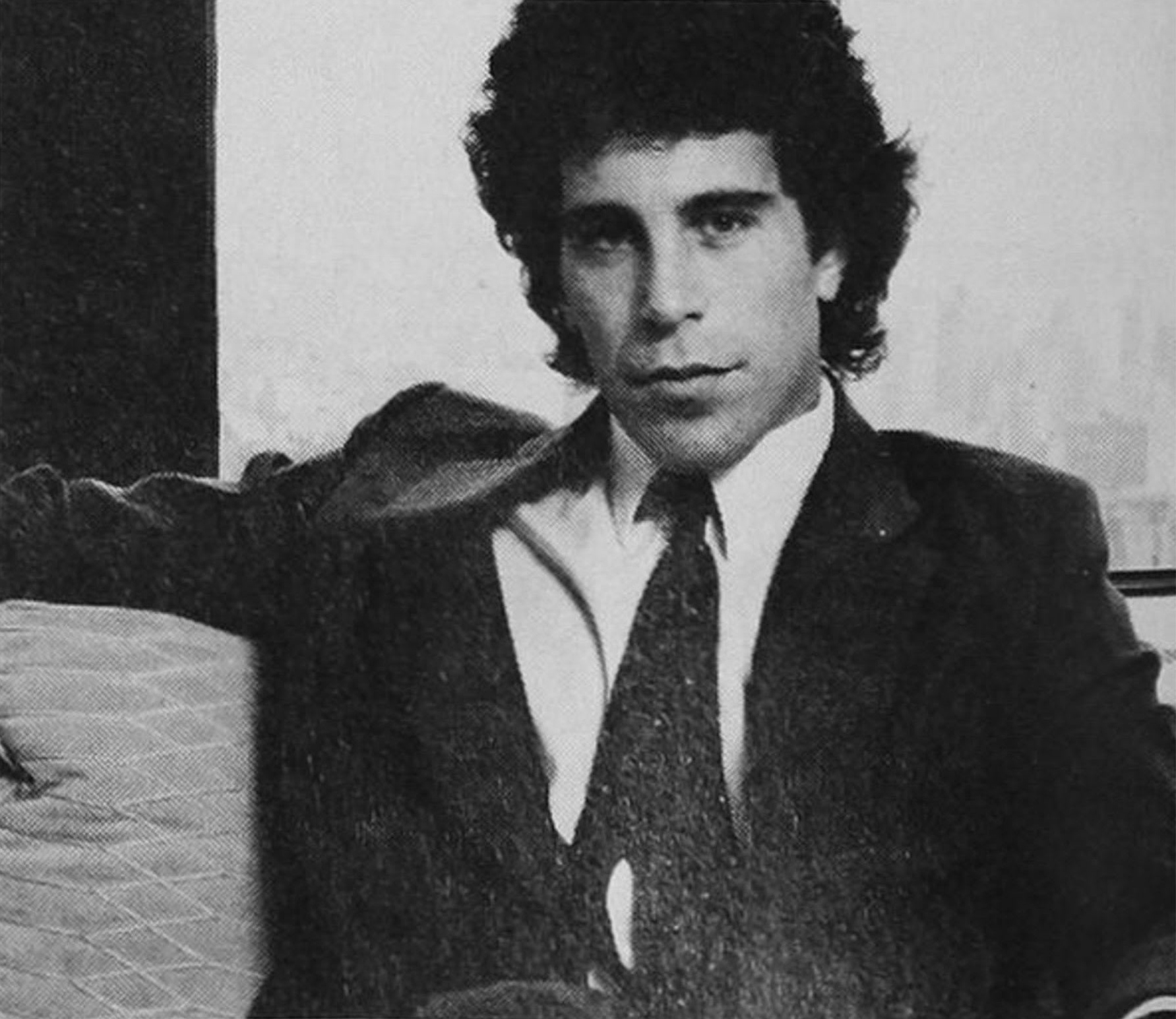
Jeffrey Epstein

Hoffenberg hired Jeffrey Epstein in 1987 to help with the Towers Financial Corporation. Hoffenberg set Epstein up in offices in the Villard Houses in Manhattan, and paid him $25,000 ($71,000 in current dollar terms) per month for his consulting work. They unsuccessfully tried to take over Pan Am in a corporate raid with Towers Financial as their raiding vessel. Their bid failed, in part because of the 1988 terrorist bombing of Pan Am Flight 103 over Lockerbie, which ultimately contributed to the airline's bankruptcy. A similar unsuccessful bid in 1988 was made to take over Emery Air Freight Corp.

Between 1988 and 1993, Towers Financial raised over $400 million by selling bonds and promissory notes to investors, luring them in using false financial statements. Hoffenberg and his associates then used the money they had raised to pay operating costs, repay earlier investors, and to pay themselves. Hoffenberg began using Towers Financial funds to pay for a lavish lifestyle that included a Locust Valley, Long Island mansion, homes on Sutton Place in Manhattan and in Florida, and a number of cars and planes. The Ponzi scheme was the largest financial fraud in American history prior to Bernie Madoff's being uncovered.

In February 1993, the Securities and Exchange Commission charged that the company, while fraudulently reporting a profit of $13 million ($31,000,000 in current dollar terms) for the four years ended June 30, 1991, actually lost $137 million ($324,000,000 in current dollar terms). In March 1993, Towers Financial filed for bankruptcy protection under Chapter 11 of the United States Bankruptcy Code.

Hoffenberg pleaded guilty in April 1995 to five criminal charges, cheating thousands of investors out of $462 million, surrendered to the FBI in Manhattan, and was arraigned and released on bail. He was sentenced in 1997 by federal judge Robert W. Sweet to 20 years in prison, and was released in 2013, after serving 18 years. He was also sentenced to pay restitution of $462 million ($927,000,000 in current dollar terms) and a $1 million fine.

Towers Financial executives Mitchell Brater (Vice Chairman) and Michael Rosoff (chief legal officer) were handed prison sentences of seven to nine years, and Rosoff was disbarred. Epstein was not charged. In July 2019, Hoffenberg claimed that Epstein was his "uncharged co-conspirator" in the ponzi scheme.

Hoffenberg stated that he didn't turn in evidence against Epstein, mentioning Epstein "had traction with" the United States Department of Justice, and outlined further, "You cannot grasp the magnitude of [Epstein's] controlling effect."

An understanding of the apparently unprecedented type of relationship between Hoffenberg and Epstein is very likely a key prerequisite in reaching a proper understanding of the Towers Financial scheme. Hoffenberg gives Epstein the dominant role by far. He stated that Epstein "had a detailed plan" to turn Towers Financial "into a financial powerhouse of funding money products around the world", and to do so "illegally".

Hoffenberg also related how Epstein further planned to use his building network of rich clients and associates in a "political influence campaign ... for his own personal, financial gain." In part this involved targeting more easily manipulated clients to be defrauded, also those unlikely to report their victimhood to the authorities, for particular reasons, should they discover the fraud.

One mode of operation involved clients' assets purchased for them by Epstein being presented as grossly more valuable than in reality, whilst Hoffenberg described that Epstein was simultaneously cheating very large sums of money for himself. Amidst and within the Towers Financial criminal dealings, Hoffenberg described Epstein as the "mastermind" behind the fraud of an insurance bond scheme and the "technician" of a Wall Street stock manipulation scheme.

In 2020 Hoffenberg added some corroboration to evidence published in a 2019 book indicating that Epstein was a top-level spy for Mossad. Over three decades after the Towers Financial scandal and six years after his prison release Hoffenberg suggested an overall intelligence aspect to Epstein. He paints a picture of Epstein's long-term ability to avoid justice, stating this was enabled by being "needed by the CIA or the FBI for intelligence, because he was manipulating the American intelligence for the overseas organizations". Jeffrey Epstein's apparent capacity to frustrate the law's probe has come to be seen in retrospect as central in his profile since his Towers Financial years, indeed rather definitive.

In 2007–08 Epstein faced a serious portfolio of charges on statutory rape and sex trafficking, although Florida Southern Attorney General Alexander Acosta agreed to a Federal Non-Prosecution Agreement, thereby reducing all charges to a single instance of solicitation of a girl under 18. This simultaneously shut down an FBI investigation into more victims and conspiring and associated powerful perpetrators of sex crimes.

In mid-2021, confirmation of some of Hoffenberg's statements was given. Former high-ranking Israeli intelligence officer Ari Ben-Menashe imparted his own, old knowledge Epstein had "started working with Israeli Intelligence... collecting secrets" (year or era not given). Whatever the relevance of this might be to Epstein's special position with US authorities, meanwhile further commentators again speculated that Epstein's unknown modes of involvement with intelligence went beyond one agency or country.

Epstein's perceived exemption from justice seemingly continues after his death, as described by Hoffenberg. The 2007–08 Non-Prosecution Agreement was retained on appeal in 2020. Effectively, at least for the moment this preserves the block, preventing future investigation into circumstances, people and organisations surrounding Epstein in those earlier charges.

Although appealed further later in 2020 to an en banc hearing, in April 2021 Epstein's ongoing, posthumous arrangement of immunity from prosecution for sex-trafficking was upheld as beyond challenge, in a majority 6-4 verdict. Recalling decades of Epstein's past and particularly the Towers Financial scandal, the victim's lawyers Cassell and Edwards commented on the "disturbing" decision: "It allows wealthy and powerful defendants (like Epstein) to orchestrate special deals without crime victims having any involvement by negotiating with prosecutors before charges are ever filed. That is not something most defendants can do." The victim's legal team has indicated the intent to appeal further to the Supreme Court.

Whilst Hoffenberg stated that he was "double-crossed" by Epstein over the Towers Ponzi scheme, he emphasised he has no "axe to grind" against Epstein but instead a "story to tell ... something to explain" over Epstein, about "his mindset, the profile, how Epstein saw things, and how he played the chess board". Hoffenberg characterised Epstein, "You’re talking about a sociopath who was only interested in advancing himself monetarily, and every component of his existence was at the destruction of other people. His only interest was how to use other people, their wealth, and their access, in order to advance himself. He destroyed everybody in his path."

In 2020, a year after his alleged suicide while in detention in a Manhattan prison on new sex trafficking charges involving minors, Epstein was described as having had a "major role" in the Towers Financial Ponzi scheme. It was reported by journalist Vicky Ward that Epstein was "pivotal" in designing how the scheme worked. In mid-2020 the American documentary mini-series Surviving Jeffrey Epstein claimed that Epstein was "at the absolute centre of the operation".

It was reported in late August 2022 that Steve Hoffenberg died at his home in Derby, Connecticut, around two or more weeks after having contracted coronavirus, his body discovered August 23. The body was found in a decomposed state, thought to be of around a week's progression, such that visual identification wasn't possible. A cause of death was not known by the stage of a preliminary autopsy in late August, when authorities believed no suspicious circumstances were involved.
