= Julie K. Brown =

American journalist (born 1961)

- Born: Julie Knipe; 1961 (age 64–65); Philadelphia, Pennsylvania, U.S.
- Education: Temple University B.A.
- Occupation: Investigative journalist
- Employer: Miami Herald
- Children: 2
- Awards: Pulitzer Prize, 2026; George Polk Award, 2014; George Polk Award, 2018; Sydney Award, 2019

Julie Knipe Brown (née Knipe; born 1961) is an American investigative journalist with the Miami Herald best known for pursuing the sex trafficking story surrounding Jeffrey Epstein, who in 2008 was allowed to plead guilty to two state-level prostitution offenses.

Brown was included in Time magazine's 100 2020 list of Most Influential People of 2020. Brown has received George Polk Awards for Justice Reporting. In 2026, Brown was awarded a Pulitzer Prize special citation, in recognition of her earlier reporting on Epstein.

== Early life and education ==
Brown was raised near Philadelphia, Pennsylvania by a single parent. She left home at 16 and worked in menial jobs before she could afford to attend college. She graduated magna cum laude from Temple University in 1987 with a degree in journalism.

== Career ==
After college, Brown worked for the Philadelphia Daily News before joining the Miami Herald, a daily newspaper owned by the McClatchy Company, around 2000.

While at the Miami Herald, Brown spent four years investigating patterns of abuse in the Florida prison system. Her reporting work prompted a 2018 federal investigation into civil rights abuses in Lowell Correctional Institution in Central Florida.

In August 2026, Brown drew media attention after referring to presidential aide Natalie Harp as President Trump’s “side piece” in a post on X.

=== Investigation into Jeffrey Epstein ===
Brown has been credited with re-opening the Jeffrey Epstein sexual abuse case with a series of reports published in November 2018. Brown began investigating Epstein in October 2016, citing a lawsuit alleging that Donald Trump and Epstein raped a then-13 year old "Katie Johnson". In early 2017 she researched a large number of accusers and the pressure campaign to silence them. Brown contacted Brad Edwards, a lawyer representing Epstein accusers, seeking information on victims. Brown reported on 80 potential victims (as young as 13 and 14 years old when the abuse occurred) and documented the eight individuals who agreed to tell their stories.

Brown's reporting on Epstein's 2008 plea deal sparked criticism of Acosta, who by then had become the United States secretary of labor, and there was pressure for him to resign. He eventually resigned after Epstein was arrested and charged in July 2019.

After Epstein was re-arrested, many commentators praised Brown and the Herald for their reporting. Geoffrey Berman, a federal prosecutor for the Southern District of New York, also commented at a news conference that his team had been “assisted by some excellent investigative journalism." But she tweeted in response "The Real Heroes Here were the courageous victims that faced their fears and told their stories".

In July 2020, Brown’s book, Perversion of Justice, based on her reporting on the Epstein case, was published by William Morrow and Company. The book served as the foundation for a limited series on HBO, executive produced by Brown, along with Kevin Messick and Adam McKay.

In March 2026, Sony Pictures TV announced a mini-series based on the book, with veteran actress Laura Dern playing Brown. Writer Sharon Hoffman will also serve as co-showrunner alongside Eileen Myers.

== Awards ==
Brown won a 2014 George Polk Award in Justice Reporting from Long Island University for "Cruel and Unusual," her series of articles on "the brutal, sometimes fatal mistreatment of Florida prison inmates with mental illnesses."

Brown received a second George Polk Award in the category of Justice Reporting in 2018 for her investigative journalism on "Perversion of Justice." Her series covered the extensive number of accusers in the Epstein case and the role of federal prosecutor Alex Acosta who permitted a non-prosecution agreement that protected four named conspirators and "granted immunity to any possible co-conspirators, a proviso that seemed to protect the powerful men Epstein partied with."

In April 2019, Alan Dershowitz (an associate of Epstein who was one of his attorneys during his criminal investigation in 2006-2008) tried to pressure the Pulitzer Prize committee to shut out Brown and the Miami Herald for her investigative reporting that reopened the Epstein case. In an open letter Dershowitz wrote that Brown should not be rewarded for her work. She was not. At the start of her investigative reporting on Epstein, Brown had been warned by former Police Chief Michael Reiter to expect pushback as other members of the media who attempted to report on Epstein had been reassigned following a phone call to their publisher. Reiter stated “Somebody’s going to call your publisher and the next thing you know you are going to be assigned to the obituaries department.”

Brown received the National Press Club Journalism Institute's 2019 Neil and Susan Sheehan award for investigative journalism in October 2019.

In December 2019, Brown and her Miami Herald colleague Emily Michot were jointly recognized for their five-part series "Perversion of Justice," with a Sidney Award, the Hillman Prize for Journalism in the Common Good, from the Sidney Hillman Foundation.

Brown was awarded a Pulitzer Prize special citation in 2026, in recognition of her earlier reporting on Epstein.

== Personal life ==
Brown has two children, one daughter and one son.

== Litigation ==
In 2022 two Epstein victims, Courtney Wild and Haley Robson, sued Brown for defamation relating to her book. In the complaint, Robson alleged that Brown threatened her after she refused to be interviewed for her book, and later presented her as an Epstein collaborator. Courtney Wild accused Brown of writing false accounts of her abuse; stating that Epstein had raped her, when she never alleged having intercourse with Epstein. The case was dismissed without prejudice in September 2022 following a joint stipulation by the parties.
