= Sarah Ransome =

Advocate and author

- Born: 1984 (age 41–42); South Africa
- Occupations: Author; activist
- Known for: Allegations against Jeffrey Epstein
- Notable work: Silenced No More: Surviving My Journey to Hell and Back

Sarah Ransome (born 1984) is a South African-born advocate and author. In 2006, she moved to New York as a 22-year-old and met Jeffrey Epstein, who provided her with financial support. Ransome alleges she was trafficked and abused by Epstein and Ghislaine Maxwell for a period of 9 months.

In 2016 Ransome told a reporter that she possessed copies of sex tapes of Donald Trump, Bill Clinton, Andrew Mountbatten-Windsor and Richard Branson, which she claimed were filmed on hidden cameras by Jeffrey Epstein for blackmail purposes. In 2019, Ransome admitted to fabricating the claim in The New Yorker.

In 2017 Ransome said that Epstein ultimately "banished" her, and purchased her a plane ticket back home to South Africa. In later accounts, she has alleged that Epstein threatened to kill her and her family, prompting her to escape and fly to the United Kingdom.

In 2021 Ransome published her book Silenced No More: Surviving My Journey to Hell and Back.

== Life and allegations ==
Ransome was born in South Africa. While attending high school, she snuck out to night clubs, and says she was raped by another teenage boy while "his classmate cheered him on". Ransome attended university in Edinburgh, Scotland, while working as an escort. Ransome states that she was raped by her college boyfriend, Rick.

In 2006 Ransome dropped out of university when she was 22. She moved to New York City, and was acquainted with video game producer Leslie Benzies. In 2023, Ransome alleged that Benzies had sexually assaulted her in December of 2006. A representative for Benzies stated that "these allegations are false. He had a consensual relationship with this person."

In July 2006 media outlets were reporting on Epstein's illegal sexual activity with minors. In December 2006, Ransome met Epstein through a friend in New York City. According to Ransome, she began giving him massages in return for payment, and as the massages became more sexual, Epstein gave her a "huge apartment in Epstein's building on the Upper East Side, along with a cell phone, a car-service account, and money for living expenses". Ransome says Epstein offered to help get her into a fashion design school. Ransome says she had an association with Epstein for 9 months.

In a 2016 sworn deposition, Ransome said that she visited Little Saint James with Epstein in 2007, and alleged that she had an argument with Epstein and Maxwell about her weight, causing her to attempt to swim off the island, before Epstein assembled a search party to bring her back. In 2021, Ransome told NPR that her attempt to swim off the island was "after I'd been raped three times and after Ghislaine had taken my food away". In her 2021 book, Ransome states that she attempted to swim off the island after Ghislaine "snatched away" her dinner and replaced it with cucumbers and tomatoes.

In her 2021 book, Ransome alleges she was raped daily by Epstein for 9 months, often three times a day.

In her 2017 deposition, Ransome said she was eventually "banished" by Epstein, who purchased her a one way ticket to South Africa, and that she "cut all ties" upon return home. In contrast, in 2021, Ransome told CBS that she had escaped from Epstein after he threatened to kill her and her parents, and escaped by flying to the United Kingdom.

In 2016 Ransome told the New York Post that Epstein had used hidden cameras to film sex tapes of high-profile men, including Donald Trump, Bill Clinton, Andrew Mountbatten-Windsor and Richard Branson. Ransome claimed that Epstein had filmed these for blackmail purposes, and that she had made copies of them. The claim was not published when Ransome appeared to walk back the statement. Her emails with the reporter emerged during lawsuits. In 2019, Ransome admitted to fabricating the claim during an interview with The New Yorker. In 2024, her emails were publicized, and Ransome said she only withdrew her claim due to "threats to her family". According to the BBC, Ransome has never produced evidence of the tapes.

In 2021 Ransome published her book Silenced No More: Surviving My Journey to Hell and Back. She starred in the 2020 Netflix series, Filthy Rich.

According to Julie K. Brown, Ransome was the only witness as of 2021 to corroborate Virginia Giuffre's allegation that Epstein had trafficked girls to other men. She states: "only one other victim, Sarah Ransome, has told a similar story about being trafficked. No other victims or witnesses have come forward publicly to corroborate Virginia's sex trafficking allegations despite the fact that some of the encounters involved multiple girls and women".

In 2017 she alleged that Epstein's former lawyer Alan Dershowitz had sexually assaulted her, following Virginia Giuffre's allegation of being trafficked to Dershowitz. He denied having met Ransome, and told The New Yorker that "the villain" was Ransome's lawyer, David Boies, who he said was "exploiting a crazy woman in order to get revenge against me". In 2022, Giuffre eventually retracted her allegations against Dershowitz.

According to a 2026 Business Insider article, Ransome's sex tape claim is tied to claims that Epstein was working for intelligence by collecting compromising videos of high-profile figures for the purposes of blackmail.

== Personal life ==
As of 2021, Ransome resides in England.

== See also ==
- Virginia Giuffre
