= Steven Hoffenberg =

American businessman and fraudster (1945–2022)

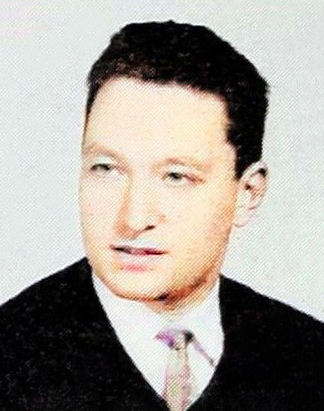
- Steven Hoffenberg in 1962
- Born: January 12, 1945; Brooklyn, New York City, U.S.
- Died: August 2022 (aged 77); Derby, Connecticut, U.S.
- Body discovered: August 23, 2022
- Employer: Towers Financial Corporation
- Known for: Court-appointed manager of the New York Post (1993), Ponzi scheme at Towers Financial Corporation, Jeffrey Epstein associate
- Criminal charges: Five counts of securities fraud, tax evasion, and obstruction of a Securities and Exchange Commission inquiry
- Criminal penalty: 20 years imprisonment and fine; served 18 years
- Spouses: Bailey Edgren (m. 1963) Second wife; Maria Santiago (m. 2014)
- Children: 1

Steven Jude Hoffenberg (January 12, 1945 – August 2022) was an American businessman and fraudster. He was the founder, CEO, president, and chairman of Towers Financial Corporation, a debt collection agency, which was later discovered to be a Ponzi scheme. In 1993, he rescued the New York Post from bankruptcy, and briefly managed the paper while its affairs were in bankruptcy court. Towers Financial collapsed in 1993, and in 1995 Hoffenberg pleaded guilty to bilking investors out of $475 million. He was sentenced to 20 years in prison (serving 18 years), plus a $1 million fine and $463 million in restitution. The U.S. SEC considered his financial crimes to be "one of the largest Ponzi schemes in history".

== Early life ==
Hoffenberg was born in Brooklyn, New York to a Jewish family on January 12, 1945, along with a twin brother, Martin. In 1971, Hoffenberg pleaded guilty to attempted second-degree larceny for trying to steal a diamond in New York. Despite later denying reports that he had indicated his involvement, he later admitted in a civil trial that he was once "involved in a theft".

== Career ==
=== Towers financial corporation ===
In the early 1970s, Hoffenberg founded Towers Financial Corporation, a New York City debt collection agency that was supposed to buy debts that people owed to hospitals, banks, and phone companies. He was its chief executive officer, president, and chairman. It was later discovered to be a Ponzi scheme. In February 1993, the Securities and Exchange Commission began a civil action against him and others, and in March 1993 Towers Financial filed for bankruptcy. In April 1995, Hoffenberg pleaded guilty to bilking investors out of $475 million. The SEC considered his financial crimes as "one of the largest Ponzi schemes in history" at the time.

=== New York Post ===
Hoffenberg was the bankrutpcy court-appointed manager of the New York Post from January to March 1993. The implosion of the Towers Ponzi scheme ended his tenure, which had seen layoffs and a revolt by the paper's staff when he brought in developer Abraham Hirschfeld as co-manager. He never actually owned the paper.

=== Prison sentence ===
In 1997, Judge Robert W. Sweet sentenced Hoffenberg to 20 years in prison. He spent 18 years at several prisons, including FCI Fort Dix (Fort Dix, New Jersey) and the Federal Medical Center, Devens (in Devens, Massachusetts). He was also ordered to pay a $1 million fine and $463 million in restitution. Per the U.S. Bureau of Prisons, he was released in October 2013. He settled a civil suit with the U.S. Securities and Exchange Commission for $60 million.

=== Relationship with Jeffrey Epstein ===
In 1987, Hoffenberg met Jeffrey Epstein through a British defense contractor named Douglas Leese. Leese was one of the architects, along with Saudi Adnan Khashoggi and Prince Bandar bin Sultan Al Saud, in the billion dollar Al-Yamamah arms deal, Britain's biggest arms deal ever concluded, earning the prime contractor, BAE Systems, at least £43 billion in revenue between 1985 and 2007. Leese told Hoffenberg about Epstein: "The guy's a genius, he's great at selling securities. And he has no moral compass." Hoffenberg hired Epstein from about 1987 to 1993 to help with the Towers Financial Corporation, paid him $25,000 a month and gave him a $2 million loan in 1988 that Epstein would never have to pay back.

Hoffenberg set Epstein up in offices in the Villard Houses. They unsuccessfully tried to take over Pan Am in a corporate raid with Towers Financial as their raiding vessel. Their bid failed, in part because of the 1988 terrorist bombing of Pan Am Flight 103 over Lockerbie, which ultimately contributed to the airline's bankruptcy. A similar unsuccessful bid in 1988 was made to take over Emery Air Freight Corp. During this period, Hoffenberg and Epstein worked closely together and traveled everywhere on Hoffenberg's private jet. Hoffenberg began using Towers Financial funds to pay off earlier investors and pay for a lavish lifestyle that included a Locust Valley, New York, Long Island mansion, as well as homes on Sutton Place (in Manhattan) and in Florida, and a number of cars and planes. In court documents, Hoffenberg claimed that Epstein was intimately involved in the Ponzi scheme. Epstein left Towers Financial before it collapsed and was never charged for being involved with the massive investor fraud committed.

In 2016, Hoffenberg and some of his victims sued Epstein, seeking restitution. He asserted in court that Epstein had been intimately involved in Tower's financial practices and called Epstein the "architect of the scam". In July 2019, following Epstein's arrest on charges of sex trafficking of minors and conspiracy to commit sex trafficking, Hoffenberg again claimed that Epstein was his "uncharged co-conspirator" in the Ponzi scheme. Former Towers investors made similar allegations in a lawsuit filed in August 2018. The lawsuit also alleged that the millions in stolen investments were the seed capital for Epstein's hedge fund, which it valued at $50 billion.

== Personal life and death ==
Hoffenberg converted to Christianity during his time in prison. Following his release, he claimed to be seeking to make amends to his victims, and also reached out to women who had made allegations of assault against his former mentee Jeffrey Epstein, with one of Epstein's accusers Maria Farmer reporting that she and Hoffenberg had become "friends." On July 10, 2014, he married Post All Star News president, Maria Santiago, after a one month romance. He held an informal wedding ceremony in front of Trump Tower in Manhattan. He had been married at least twice before, and had a daughter from a relationship he had been having at the time of his federal prosecution; his daughter met him for the first time at the age of 19 after he was released from prison.

Hoffenberg was found dead at his apartment in Derby, Connecticut, on August 23, 2022, at the age of 77. Epstein accuser Maria Farmer said she called police to check in on Hoffenberg after she failed to reach him over the phone during the preceding week. His body was in an advanced state of decomposition, and a Derby police officer estimated that he had been dead for roughly a week by the time his remains were found. An initial autopsy found no evidence of trauma on his body and police said they believe he died of natural causes.
