= Michael Reiter =

American security advisor and former Palm Beach, Florida, police chief

- Born: Pittsburgh, Pennsylvania
- Education: Florida Atlantic University; Palm Beach Atlantic University; Harvard Kennedy School; FBI National Academy
- Occupations: Security advisor, former chief of Palm Beach Police Department
- Website: michaelreiterandassociates.com

Michael Reiter is an American security advisor who was chief of police of Palm Beach, Florida, from 2001 to 2009. Having served in the Palm Beach Police Department since 1981, he has been involved in several high-profile criminal investigations in the affluent town with several nationally-prominent residents, including the overdose death of David Kennedy and the criminal investigation into Jeffrey Epstein. Reiter came to international attention from the mid-2000s when he initiated the first inquiry into Epstein, an investor who was accused of involvement in multinational child sex trafficking and having sex with a minor, and was later convicted for soliciting an underage girl for prostitution.

== Early life ==
Reiter was born and grew up in Pittsburgh, Pennsylvania. While serving as a police officer, he earned several college degrees and certifications in law enforcement and public safety. He graduated with a bachelor's degree in criminal justice from Florida Atlantic University. He later earned a master's degree in human resource development from Palm Beach Atlantic University in 1996. Reiter also graduated from the Senior Executives in State and Local Government Program and the Crisis Management Program at Harvard University's John F. Kennedy School of Government. Reiter is also a graduate of the FBI National Academy and the U.S. Secret Service's Dignitary Protection Program.

== Police officer and detective ==
Before joining the police department in the Town of Palm Beach, Florida, Reiter served as a campus police officer in Pittsburgh, Pennsylvania. In 1981, at 22 years old, he moved to Palm Beach and joined the Palm Beach Police Department (PBPD) as a patrol officer and later became a detective investigating organized crime, substance abuse, and vice.

In 1984, one of his first cases as a detective was investigating the source of illegal drugs after the death of David Kennedy. Reiter was the lead investigator on the highly publicized case involving the third son of Ethel and Robert F. Kennedy. For two years, he investigated the cocaine suppliers that provided the illegal drugs that led to Kennedy's overdose death. Even a decade later, Reiter continued to get tips from supposed informants who claimed to have new information on the case.

Reiter was promoted to sergeant in 1985. By 1989, he was head of the Organized Crime, Vice, and Narcotics Unit. He continued to rise through the ranks to captain in 1992, and major in 1993, before serving as assistant chief for three years beginning in 1998. During this period, Reiter led the investigation of several cases including the serial jewel burglar Alvara Valdez who was convicted after committing dozens of residential burglaries in Florida with losses in the millions of dollars. Reiter also developed a criminal investigation curriculum for the Federal Law Enforcement Training Center located in Georgia.

== Police chief ==
Reiter was appointed as chief of the police department in March 2001. He described his management philosophy as "principle-centered leadership" and advocated for programs such as the Citizen Police Academy and the Teen Police Academy. As police chief, he also encouraged programs such as Volunteers in Police Service and Palm Beach Crime Watch. At the same time, he served as vice-chairman of the Palm Beach County Anti-Terrorism Committee in 2003 and chairman of the committee in 2004. In November 2004, he also served as chairman of the Palm Beach County Election Security Task Force.

In 2004, Reiter initiated the first inquiry into Jeffrey Epstein and his involvement in human trafficking. Prior to the investigation, Epstein had made donations to the PBPD for the purchase of additional equipment needed to investigate a crime in which Epstein was the victim. However, Reiter grew suspicious of the billionaire after his officers received reports of suspicious activity around Epstein's home—such as young women entering and exiting the home at odd hours and loitering on the block. Reiter instituted 24-hour surveillance of Epstein's property, and his officers were able to obtain from Epstein's trash a note pad containing the names of possible victims. During a several-months-long investigation, the department gathered testimony from five victims and 17 witnesses. Reiter requested that Epstein be charged with at least four counts of unlawful sexual conduct with a minor with girls as young as 14 years old. The chief also returned the recent donations to PBPD back to Epstein. The Palm Beach County State Attorney, Barry Krischer, according to Reiter initially indicated he was supportive of bringing charges against Epstein. However, after meeting with Epstein's attorneys, Krischer took "the unusual step of preparing to present the case to a grand jury", according to a 2020 report on the case by the Office of Professional Responsibility of the Department of Justice.

After turning the evidence over to prosecutors, Reiter was "outraged" to learn that the State Attorney's office had offered Epstein a plea agreement. On May 1, 2006, Reiter submitted to Krischer probable cause affidavits and requested an arrest warrant be issued for Epstein's arrest. Reiter included a letter to Krischer, "all but demanding that [Krischer] recuse himself from the case." Reiter believed that Krischer was being pressured by Epstein's attorneys to lessen the charges. Epstein had also hired private investigators to follow Chief Reiter and the lead detective on the case. Reiter was also pressured by some residents of Palm Beach to ease up on his investigation into Epstein.

At a grand jury hearing in July 2006, state prosecutors obtained an indictment of one count of felony solicitation of prostitution. Again dissatisfied by the outcome, Reiter contacted the Federal Bureau of Investigation and the federal prosecutor for the Southern District of Florida, Alexander Acosta. Reiter also sent letters to the each of victim's parents explaining that he believed justice had not been served. Epstein, under threat of federal prosecution, agreed to plead guilty to the state charge of soliciting an underage girl for prostitution, served a 13-month jail sentence, and was registered as a sex offender.

On January 23, 2009, Reiter announced his retirement from the Palm Beach Police Department, effective February 27, after 28 years with the department and the last eight years as the police chief.

== Late career and public profile ==
Following his retirement from the department, Reiter founded Michael Reiter and Associates, a Palm Beach-based firm that provides private security, crisis management, and investigative services. Reiter is also one of the directors of the Palm Beach Civic Association and a member of the Leadership Council of the National Law Enforcement Museum in Washington, D.C.

When the Epstein case became common knowledge in the late 2010s, several publications, including Irish Examiner, Sun-Sentinel, The Wall Street Journal, Vanity Fair, described Reiter as one of the few heroes of the Epstein case. Epstein was arrested again on July 6, 2019, on federal charges for the sex trafficking of minors in Florida and New York. Epstein died in his jail cell on August 10, 2019. In September 2019, Reiter, along with several of Epstein's victims, was interviewed by Savannah Guthrie on NBC's Dateline on which he advocated for laws preventing minors from being labeled as prostitutes in courts. He appeared in all four episodes of the Netflix's May 2020 documentary series Jeffrey Epstein: Filthy Rich, which in part details how the PBPD surveilled Epstein. Reiter appeared in the ABC documentary Truth and Lies: The Jeffrey Epstein Story. He also appears in the first episode of an ABC News podcast, Truth and Lies: Jeffrey Epstein, published in July 2020 which also details Epstein's crimes and the investigation into the case.

== Personal life ==
Reiter is married to Janet Pleasants, and they continue to live in Palm Beach. He is a historian with a particular interest in early Palm Beach history. Reiter acts as Palm Beach's unofficial town historian, and he was the initial organizer of the town's centennial celebration in 2011.

In 1996, with the help of the Historical Society of Palm Beach County, Reiter rediscovered the first two and, as of 2006, the only PBPD officers to die in the line of duty: Joseph Smith (d. 1923) and John Cash (d. 1926). In May 2006, the officers were commemorated with an inscribed plaque in Memorial Fountain Park. In June 1999, he also rediscovered the lost story of a West Palm Beach Police (WPBP) officer, William Morgan Payton, who was killed while on duty. While researching the unrelated deaths in his own police department's early history, Reiter discovered a press clipping about the 1924 trial on Payton's death and alerted the WPBP. Payton was later recognized as the first West Palm Beach Police officer killed in the line of duty.

== Bibliography ==
- "Empowerment Policing". FBI Law Enforcement Bulletin. 68 (2): 7–11. February 1999.
