= Shulyak =

Shulyak is a surname. Notable people with the surname include:

- Karyna Shulyak (fl. early 21st century), Belarusian dentist
- Petro Shulyak (born 1945), Ukrainian colonel general
