= Personal life of Jeffrey Epstein =

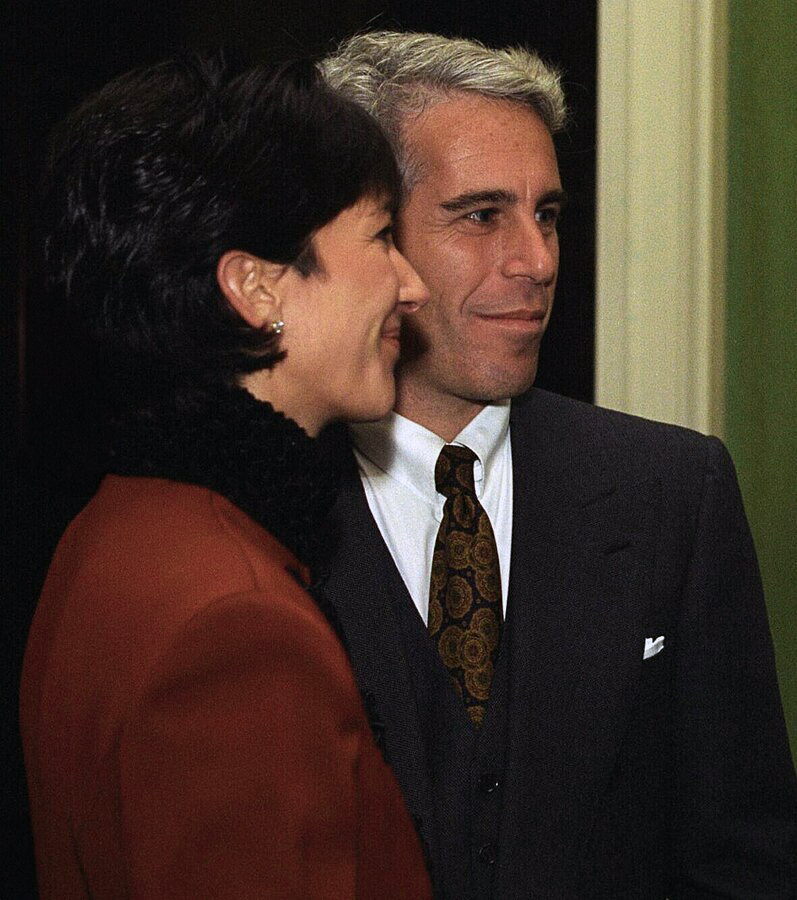
Epstein with Ghislaine Maxwell in 1993

The American financier and child sex offender Jeffrey Epstein cultivated an elite social circle of prominent individuals from across Western high society. He was acquaintances or friends with public figures including Donald Trump, Bill Clinton, Elon Musk, Peter Thiel, Sergey Brin, Noam Chomsky, Steve Bannon, Ehud Barak, Mohammed bin Salman, Richard Branson, Leon Black; former Prince Andrew, Duke of York; Bill Gates; Mette-Marit, Crown Princess of Norway; and many others. The Epstein files, a collection of documents which has been partially released as part of the Epstein Files Transparency Act, provide a public glimpse into the vast network he had cultivated over the late 20th and early 21st centuries. Epstein had a decades-long association with socialite Ghislaine Maxwell, who dated him for an extended period and recruited young girls for him, leading to her 2021 conviction for sex trafficking and child sexual abuse. Epstein's other romantic partners included Eva Andersson-Dubin, Sarah Kellen and Karyna Shuliak.

Epstein had high self-regard and became socially well-connected because he was skilled at human relations. He said: "I saw lots of people doing lots of hard work, and hard work didn't translate into success either. It wasn't what you knew or how hard you worked. In fact, the people who were doing construction on Telegraph Avenue at that time, you know, coming in at seven o'clock in the morning and spending 12 hours working, they looked like they still were neither happy nor successful, so it was not, you know, and what I learned from [my job at the] Dalton [School], lots of it in fact, turns out to not necessarily be who you are but who you came in contact with."

== Romances and procuresses ==
=== Eva Andersson-Dubin (1980s) ===
Epstein dated Eva Andersson-Dubin for an 11-year period, mostly in the 1980s. After her marriage to Glenn Dubin in 1994, she and her husband remained friends with Epstein.

=== Ghislaine Maxwell (1991–2004) ===
Epstein met Ghislaine Maxwell, daughter of disgraced media baron Robert Maxwell, by 1991. Epstein had Ghislaine come to the U.S. in 1991 to recover from her grief following her father's death in November that year. She was later implicated by several Epstein accusers as procuring, or recruiting, underage girls in addition to being, for an extended period, Epstein's chief girlfriend. Epstein household employees testified in 2009 that Maxwell had a central role in his public and private life, referring to her as his "main girlfriend" who handled the hiring, supervising, and firing of staff starting around 1992. In 1995, Epstein renamed one of his companies the Ghislaine Corporation in Palm Beach, Florida; the company was dissolved in 1998. In 2000, Maxwell moved into a 7,000-square-foot townhouse, less than ten blocks from Epstein's New York mansion. This townhome was purchased for $5 million by an anonymous limited liability company, with an address that matches the office of J. Epstein & Co. Representing the buyer was Darren Indyke, Epstein's lawyer.

A picture of Epstein and Maxwell, sitting at a cabin on Queen Elizabeth II's Balmoral estate, around 1999, at the invitation of then prince Andrew Mountbatten-Windsor (then known as Prince Andrew, Duke of York) was shown to her jury to establish their status as romantic partners. In a 2003 Vanity Fair article, Epstein refers to Maxwell as "my best friend". In 2003, for a 50th birthday gift, Maxwell assembled an album of well-wishes from his friends; among the bawdy greetings was one from Donald Trump. In 2025, with the Epstein files in the public spotlight, the Wall Street Journal revealed details of the album. Virginia Giuffre alleged that Epstein and Maxwell sought to use her as a surrogate mother for a baby they were planning to have together.

In a 2022 interview, Maxwell said that "If I could go back today, I would avoid meeting him, and I would say that that would be the greatest mistake I've ever made, and I would make different choices for where I would work,"

=== Sarah Kellen ===
According to Epstein pilot David Rodgers, Sarah Kellen began to take over Maxwell's role as "number two" in the Epstein organization after Maxwell entered a new romantic relationship around 2004 and started separating herself from Epstein around that time. She was listed alongside Nadia Marcinko, Lesley Groff, and Adriana Ross as unindicted co-conspirators in 2009, helping to supply Epstein's organization with underage girls.

=== Karyna Shuliak (2010–2019) ===
Epstein's last female partner was Karyna Shuliak. Shuliak has not said she was one of his victims, and released files show that they had an eight-year relationship. He gave her a 33-carat diamond ring "in contemplation of marriage" and named her as a main beneficiary in his will: she could inherit as much as $100 million.

She met Epstein in 2011 when she was 21 years old. She was in the United States on a temporary student visa to study English and working as a dental assistant when another woman introduced her to Epstein. He donated about $210,000 to Columbia University to help her get into their dental school, Drs. Thomas Magnani and James Fine helped her prepare for the admissions exams, and Epstein paid her tuition.

Epstein provided financial support to her and her parents in Belarus. He helped her get US citizenship by setting up a marriage between her and one of his female victims after she overstayed her student visa. Epstein and Shuliak often professed their love to each other; they fought about his insistence on having sex with other women in their 20s including his assistants whom he called his "family". Shuliak traveled globally with him, helped manage his properties and staff, and lived in his New York mansion. She was helping him buy a Moroccan palace when he was arrested the final time.

She did not think he sounded suicidal when they spoke hours before his death, in a 15-minute call not logged and not recorded by his guards, as ought to have been the practice. In 2023, Shuliak was admitted to a postdoctoral program at Columbia, and she began practicing dentistry in New York after her 2025 graduation. In 2026, Shuliak was living in an apartment owned by Mark Epstein's real estate company.

=== Juvenile victims ===
Virginia Giuffre met Ghislaine Maxwell in mid 2000, when she was almost 17, while working as a spa attendant at Mar-a-Lagos. Life with Epstein provided a kind of security; he paid her, got her an apartment, and took her to New Mexico, London, Paris, Tangiers, and his island." A woman attested in a lawsuit that Epstein employed her to procure underage girls, including at the Port Authority Bus Terminal, and she had witnessed a rape by Epstein.

Anouska De Georgiou, who says "Jeffrey thought that we were disposable", came to Epstein via modelling. Chauntae Davies and Rachel Benavidez came via massage services. Epstein manipulated Benavidez when they met at Zorro Ranch over two years, only to expel her from his circle when she refused to sign a non-disclosure agreement. Benavidez said: "He provided me with promises of continuing education and a clientele that's a world-class clientele. And that's kind of how he lured his tentacles into me." Attorney Brad Edwards, who represents more than 200 victims, notes that while Epstein sexually abused all these women and girls, only a small percentage were sent to be abused by other men, who were also a select few.

=== Alleged children ===
According to The Times, emails released by the U.S. authorities could suggest that Epstein might have fathered a number of children. One of his victims claimed to have given birth to a girl in about 2002 when she would have been 16 or 17 years old, but the child was taken from her by Ghislaine Maxwell 10 minutes after the birth. An email sent to him by Sarah Ferguson in 2011 congratulated him on the birth of a boy. FBI documents from 2020 contained claims of a victim who stated that she had seen "a picture of a blonde woman on the beach" in Epstein's New York home and he had mentioned to her that she was the mother of his child before showing her a "torso sculpture" of the same woman.

== Acquaintances ==
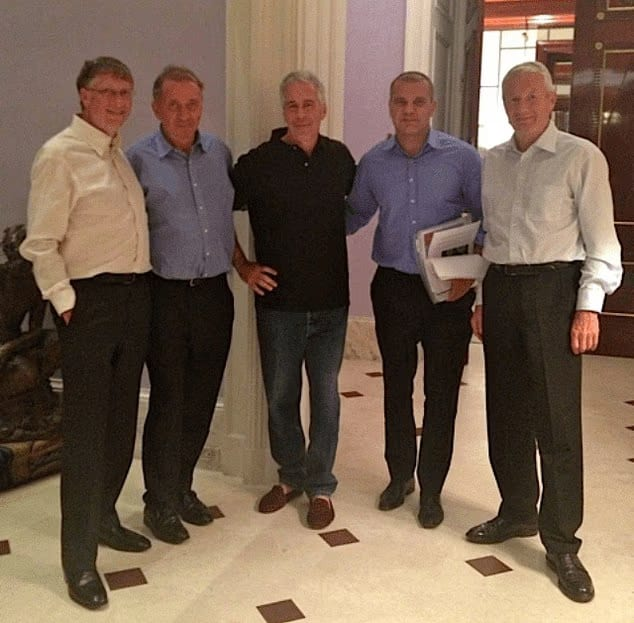
Bill Gates, Terje Rød-Larsen, Jeffrey Epstein, Boris Nikolic and Thorbjørn Jagland

Epstein was a longtime friend of Andrew Mountbatten-Windsor (formerly Prince Andrew, Duke of York), Mette-Marit, Crown Princess (now Queen) of Norway, and Tom Barrack, and attended parties with or otherwise frequented many prominent people, including Harvey Weinstein (who would also be convicted for sex offences), David Copperfield, Bill Clinton, George Stephanopoulos, Mark Zuckerberg, Reid Hoffman, Elon Musk, Donald Trump, Jack Horner, Noam Chomsky, Katie Couric, Woody Allen, Jeff Bezos, Sergey Brin, Larry Page, Lewis Ranieri, Ronald Perelman, Tom Pritzker, Naomi Campbell, and Stephen Hawking. Two printed phone directories belonging to Epstein, commonly referred to as the "black books", included Rupert Murdoch, Michael Bloomberg, Andrew Cuomo, John Kerry, Richard Branson, Alec Baldwin, David Koch, and Michael Jackson. These books included Israeli prime minister Ehud Barak, British prime minister Tony Blair, and Saudi crown prince Mohammed bin Salman.

Epstein was involved with Sarah Ferguson and Maxwell maintains he bailed Ferguson out of financial difficulties; however, Epstein's relationship with Ferguson would become hostile by 2011. Epstein was seen at least once talking with Princess Diana. He negotiated a 1993 divorce settlement for Lynn Forester before she married Evelyn de Rothschild. Lady de Rothschild re-introduced Epstein to Alan Dershowitz; they had known each other at least since 1997, and their friendship was revealed by flight logs in 2015. Dershowitz said that "outside of his immediate family" he only showed manuscripts before they were published to his friend Epstein.

Epstein took Bill Clinton, Kevin Spacey and Chris Tucker on a trip aboard his Boeing 727 jet. Clinton and Trump said they never visited Little Saint James, an island Epstein had owned since 1998, until his death. A Freedom of Information Act request in 2017 for U.S. Secret Service records found no evidence that Clinton ever visited Epstein's island, with Maxwell revealing in August 2025 that Clinton, who ceased having contact with Epstein in 2003, was connected to Epstein through her. However, Clinton was listed on Epstein's flight logs at least 11 times with Sarah Kellen between 2002 and 2003. Despite this, emails from 2011, including one which involved Epstein engaging in a private discussion over a stolen telephone book, and 2015 were also released in November 2025 which revealed that Epstein personally denied that Bill Clinton ever visited his island, with Epstein telling someone he identified as "the Duke" in the 2011 email: "[T]hese stories are complete ant utter fantasy,, I don't know and look have never met Al gore, CLinton was never on the island ... the telephone book is not mine, it was stolen by my houseman that is currently in prison for doing so."

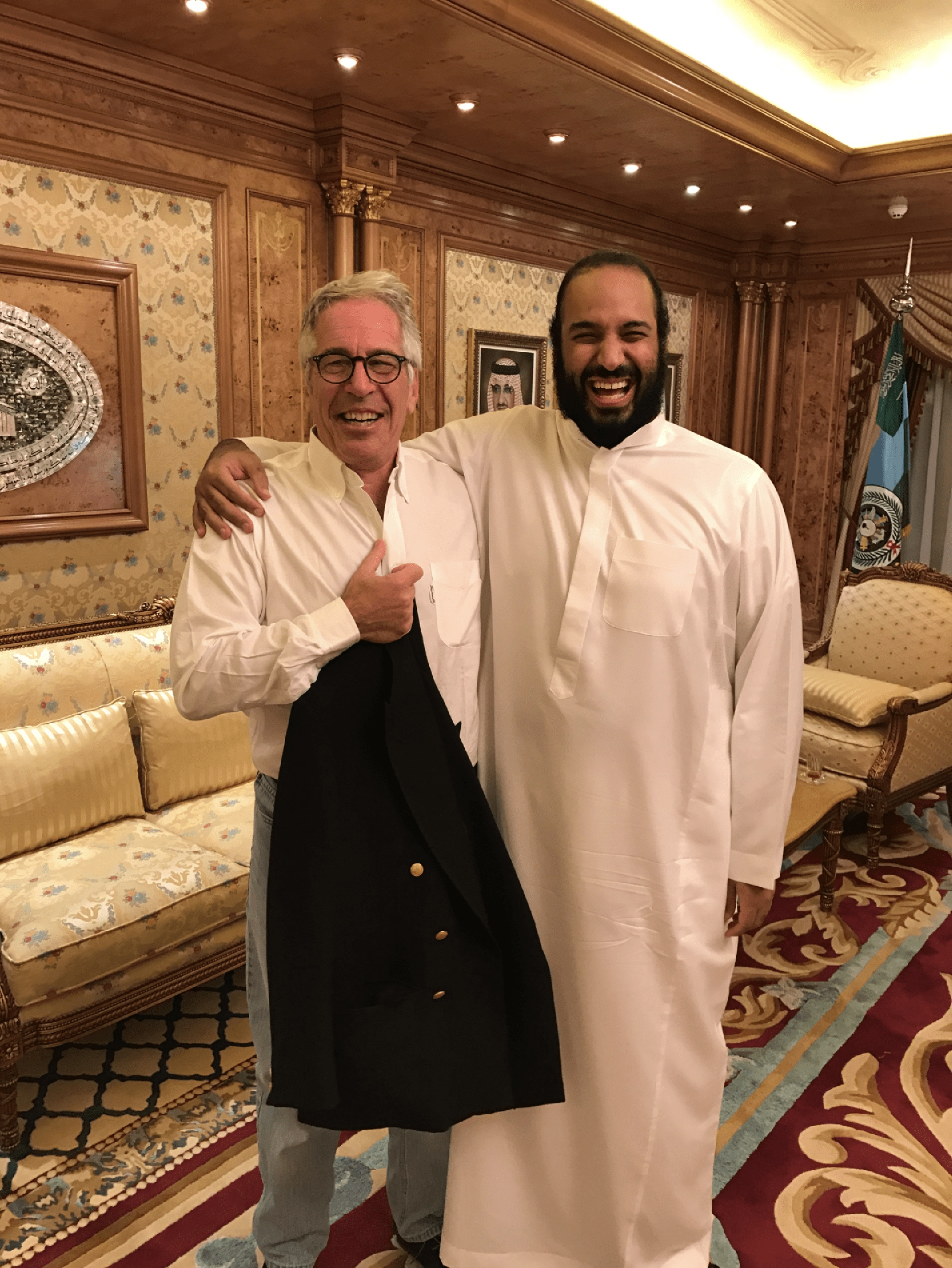
Epstein with Saudi Crown Prince Mohammed bin Salman in Riyadh, c. 2016–2017. A framed copy of this photo was displayed in Epstein's New York mansion.

In 2014, Epstein asked journalist Michael Wolff, an acquaintance, to write his biography. Andrew Lownie, author of Entitled: The Rise and Fall of the House of York, remarks that Epstein circulated among his houseguests "catalogs of photographs. We know that there were books of photographs passed around Epstein's homes where powerful men could choose the [women] they wanted to meet." Disgust with Epstein was cited by Melinda French Gates as one of the reasons for her divorce of Bill Gates, who met Epstein after he had been convicted in 2008. Bill Gates's relationship with Epstein started in 2011 and continued for years. In 2021, Gates said he met with Epstein because he hoped Epstein could provide money for philanthropic work, but that nothing came of it. Gates added, "It was a huge mistake to spend time with him, to give him the credibility of being there." Political strategist Steve Bannon and Epstein were introduced after Bannon's 2017 ejection from the White House. Bannon met with Epstein several times at his mansion in New York. Via text message in 2018, Epstein coached Bannon on messaging. In 2019, Bannon interviewed Epstein, generating 15 hours of video, to help prepare him for a 60 Minutes interview that never occurred.

=== Pre-penal Epstein ===
Michael Wolff, who met Epstein around 2001, advised him on press relations, and told Epstein that if he wanted a low profile it would be better not to return calls from reporters and issue a standard "no comment". Epstein did the opposite, leading to a 2002 profile by New York magazine, which was followed in 2003 by Vanity Fair. Wolff met Epstein at a party that included Malcolm Gladwell, Steven Pinker, John Brockman, and David Rockwell. Epstein asked Rockwell to critique his architectural plans for Little St. James. These events may have occurred in 2002 when Geraldine Laybourne is documented in the logs to have been a passenger between JFK and MRY. Wolff says TED conferences served Epstein as hunting grounds for interesting personalities who would otherwise have been outside his circle of acquaintance.

=== Post-penal Epstein ===
After his 2008 incarceration, Epstein was shunned by some acquaintances. Hollywood hostess Peggy Siegal helped facilitate his return to elite company through dinner parties at Herbert Straus house, and allowing his attendance at Oscar parties. Siegal, who was Epstein's connection to the entertainment world, was quoted as saying, "He said he'd served his time and assured me that he changed his ways", but USVI attorney-general Denise George alleged in a 2020 lawsuit that Epstein raped girls on his island as young as 11.

As socialite Anne Hearst said, if Siegal's "personally P.R.'ing you as a friend, you'll wind up at the right hand of God." After Epstein's release, Siegal got Epstein an invitation to a screening of Wall Street: Money Never Sleeps in a Southampton NY mansion where he met with old friend Leon Black, then-Commerce Secretary Wilbur Ross and Rudy Giuliani. Siegal tempted Katie Couric, George Stephanopoulos, Charlie Rose, Chelsea Handler, Woody Allen, and Soon-Yi Previn to attend a dinner organized in 2011 by Epstein for Prince Andrew; Stephanopoulos now says it was a mistake. Since Epstein's death, Siegal has been shunned by several in the film industry, as she is seen as one of Epstein's tools. Brockman did not end his friendship with Epstein after the latter's conviction. Brockman's literary dinners, often held during the TED Conference, were, for years after Epstein's conviction, funded by Epstein as documented in tax filings. This allowed Epstein to mingle with scientists, startup icons and tech billionaires.

=== Association with Donald Trump ===
From the 1980s to mid-2000s, Epstein often socialized with Donald Trump. Trump, Epstein, and Tom Barrack were like a "set of nightlife musketeers" on the social scene. Epstein and Trump socialized in New York and Palm Beach, where they had houses. An anonymous source who knew Epstein and Trump told The Washington Post that "they were tight...each other's wingmen." Epstein told Wolff in 2017 that he "was [Trump]'s closest friend for ten years"; Wolff believes Epstein feared Trump after the 2016 election, because each had accumulated information that could incriminate the other.

In 2002, Trump remarked: "I've known Jeff for fifteen years. Terrific guy. He's a lot of fun to be with. It is even said that he likes beautiful women as much as I do, and many of them are on the younger side. No doubt about it – Jeffrey enjoys his social life." In 2019, Trump said "I knew him like everybody in Palm Beach knew him", stating he had not been "a fan" of Epstein and had not spoken to him in about 15 years. A 1992 video surfaced showing them partying together at Mar-a-Lago.

In 2004, Epstein and Trump's friendship ran into trouble when they became embroiled in a bidding war for a $40 million mansion, Maison de L'Amitié, auctioned in Palm Beach. Trump won for $41 million, and sold it 4 years later for $95 million to billionaire Dmitry Rybolovlev. That was the last time Epstein and, Trump were recorded to have interacted. In 2007, Trump reportedly banned Epstein from his Mar-a-Lago club for unseemly pursuit of young girls. The ban allegation was included in court documents filed by attorney Bradley Edwards, although Edwards later said it was a rumor he could not confirm. According to the 2020 book The Grifter's Club, Mar-a-Lago's registry shows Epstein was a member until October 2007. In 2025, The Daily Beast reported Epstein remained a member at Mar-a-Lago for years after the date Trump had claimed to cancel his membership, while in a 2019 email to Wolff, Epstein denied having ever been a member.

=== Association with Mette-Marit, Crown Princess of Norway ===
Epstein was a longtime acquaintance of Mette-Marit, crown princess of Norway. In 2026, further Epstein files were released, showing extensive and close contact between Epstein and Mette-Marit for years after his release from prison, including hundreds of references to her.

=== Association with Woody Allen ===
In December 2025, Woody Allen stated that he was "not sorry" about his friendship with Epstein. They were acknowledged to have been neighbors by 2010. Allen stated in 2025 that none of the girlfriends Epstein had when they were neighbors were underage girls. Allen described Epstein as both "charming and personable." Despite this, Allen is acknowledged to have sent a letter to Epstein commemorating his 63rd birthday in 2016, with Allen acknowledging in the letter his knowledge of how "several young women" visited Epstein and how the parties he attended at Epstein's New York home were attended by "politicians, scientists, teachers, magicians, comedians, intellectuals, journalists, an entymologist, a concert pianist." In the letter, Allen noted how Epstein's New York townhome reminded him of "Castle Dracula where [Bela] Lugosi has three young female vampires who service the place. Add to this that Jeffrey lives in a vast house alone, one can picture him sleeping in damp earth."

=== Association with Noam Chomsky ===
In 2025, Epstein files released by the House Oversight Committee which revealed that linguistics educator and political activist Noam Chomsky had closely befriended Epstein after his 2008 conviction. Chomsky remained in touch with him until at least 2017. These included a formal letter of endorsement from 2017 or later. In one letter, he wrote that he considered Epstein a "highly valued friend and regular source of intellectual exchange and stimulation." In December 2025, Congress released a photo of Chomsky with Steve Bannon from Epstein's estate and another showing him with Epstein while flying in Epstein's jet. Prior to the files' release, he had said he received around $270,000 from an account connected to Epstein while sorting through common funds after his wife Carol's death. Chomsky noted how Epstein assisted his second wife Valeria's efforts, although with "limited success", to get him introduced to "the world of jazz and its wonders".

=== Association with Bill Clinton ===
In 2002, a spokesman of Clinton lauded Epstein as "a committed philanthropist" with "insights and generosity". Epstein visited the White House while Clinton was president on four known occasions. In 1993, he went to a donor event at the White House with Maxwell. He met with Clinton aide Mark Middleton on at least three occasions at the White House. In 1995, financier Lynn Forester discussed "Epstein and currency stabilization" with Clinton. Epstein traded large amounts in the unregulated forex market. In 1995, Epstein attended a fundraiser dinner for Clinton which included 14 other people including Ron Perelman, Don Johnson and Jimmy Buffett.

=== Association with John Casablancas ===
The Guardian alleged that John Casablancas, founder of Elite Model Management, was connected to Epstein, and, according to a 2019 lawsuit, he had sent a 15-year-old female model in 1990 to meet a photographer later identified as Epstein, who sexually assaulted her. The newspaper had earlier published an obituary stating, "Casablancas was frank about his personal preference for girls of only just legal age – 'child women'."

=== Association with Harvey Weinstein ===
Epstein associated with film producer and fellow sex offender Harvey Weinstein, and they had a favorite outdoor table at a restaurant in the Hamptons; however, Epstein severed his relationship with Weinstein when the latter "acted too aggressively with one of his 'favorite girls.'"

== Club memberships ==
Epstein was a member of the Council on Foreign Relations from 1995 to 2009, his donations to the Council during the period of 1995 till 2005 totalled $350,000. He was also a member of the Trilateral Commission and the Rockefeller Institute, and the Institute of International Education.

== Lolita Express ==
Epstein's flight manifests from 1997 to 2005, as publicly released at trial in 2009 (Epstein v. Edwards)

Epstein, often pictured with or in a Gulfstream G550 jet, owned the company JEGE from which he chartered the plane, as well as a separate Boeing 727. The Gulfstream jet was nicknamed the Lolita Express in reference to the 1955 novel Lolita by Vladimir Nabokov. Forbes reported that between 1990 and 2001, the jet was owned by Wexner, who then transferred it for an undisclosed sum to Epstein. Andrew Mountbatten-Windsor and Bill Clinton flew on Epstein's planes. Robert F. Kennedy Jr. was interviewed during his 2024 presidential bid, and confirmed he had traveled with Epstein. In 2003, Epstein flew to Cuba with former Colombian president Andrés Pastrana Arango at the invitation of Cuban president Fidel Castro.

President Trump briefly mentioning Epstein during a bilateral meeting with Tamim bin Hamad Al Thani in July 2019.

Trump flew at least six times on Epstein's planes between 1993 and 1997. Trump flew Epstein on his airplane at least once. In 2002, Epstein flew Clinton, Kevin Spacey, and Chris Tucker to Africa in the G550. Flight records obtained in 2016 show Clinton flew 27 times. In 2002 and 2003, Clinton took four trips on Epstein's airplane, making stops on three continents, with his staff and Secret Service detail.

== Media profile ==
Despite close friendships with high profile individuals such as Leslie Wexner and Donald Trump, Epstein was hardly ever discussed in the media prior to 2002, with the New York Magazine describing him in October 2002 as an "International Money Man of Mystery" and noting that he was hardly ever even a subject of "gossip columns" until recently. However, Epstein's media awareness would significantly increase after Bill Clinton, Kevin Spacey and Chris Tucker traveled in his plane during an African humanitarian trip in September 2002. His romantic relationship with Ghislaine Maxwell would also become more reported during this time as well.

== Political activities ==
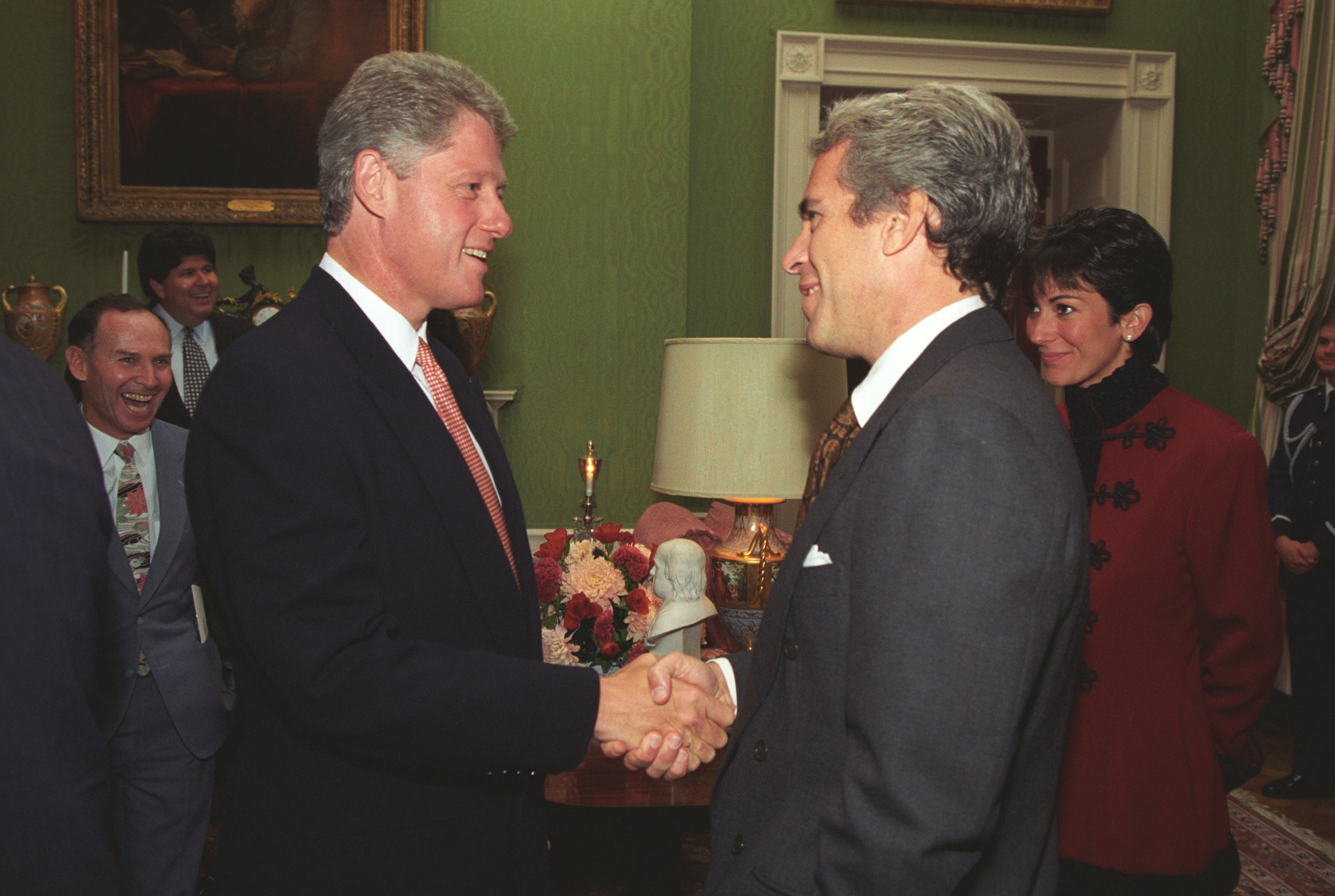
Epstein shaking hands with President Bill Clinton at the White House, September 1993 (with Ghislaine Maxwell in the background on the right)

In 2002, Epstein said: "I invest in people — be it politics or science. It's what I do." From 1989 until 2003, Epstein donated more than $139,000 to Democratic Party federal candidates and committees and over $18,000 to Republican Party candidates and groups. Epstein contributed $10,000 to refurbish the West Wing of the White House in 1993, which bought him and Maxwell photos with Bill Clinton. He was noted for his contributions to senators Al D'Amato and George J. Mitchell.

Epstein contributed $50,000 to Democrat Bill Richardson's successful campaign for Governor of New Mexico in 2002 and again for his successful run for reelection in 2006. He contributed $15,000 to Democrat Gary King's successful campaign for Attorney General of New Mexico. He contributed $35,000 to King's 2014 campaign for Governor. Other contributions in New Mexico included $10,000 toward Jim Baca's campaign to become head of the land commission and $2,000 toward Santa Fe County sheriff Jim Solano's bid for reelection. In 2010, Epstein received a notice from New Mexico Department of Public Safety which said, "You are not required to register [as a sex offender] with the state of New Mexico." This was in contravention of federal law, which appears to say the conviction in Florida required him to register in New Mexico. In 2018, Epstein contributed $30,000 to Stacey Plaskett, the local Democrat Congresswoman of the U.S. Virgin Islands.

=== Philanthropy ===
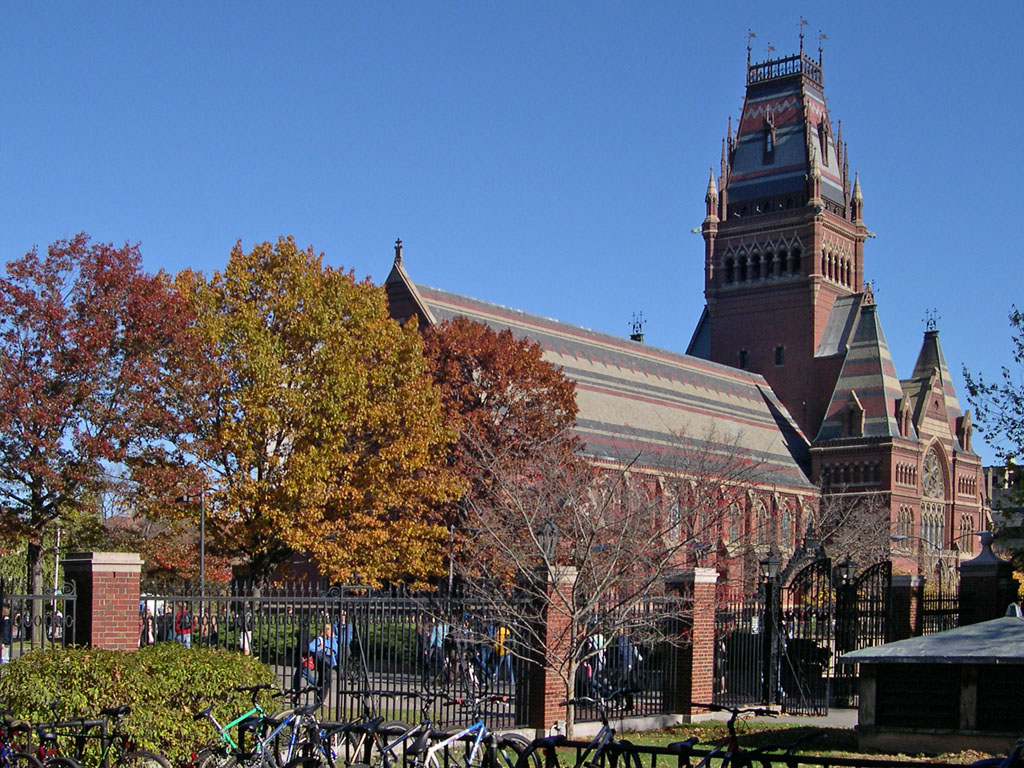
Epstein donated millions of dollars to Harvard University over the years for different causes.

In 1991, Epstein was one of four donors who pledged to raise US$2 million for a Hillel student building Rosovsky Hall at Harvard University. In the 1990s Epstein donated $10,000 to the White House Historical Association. In 2000, Epstein established the Jeffrey Epstein VI Foundation, which funds science research and education. Prior to 2003, the foundation funded Martin Nowak's research at the Institute for Advanced Study in Princeton, New Jersey. In 2003, Epstein pledged donations totaling US$30 million to create a mathematical biology and evolutionary dynamics program at Harvard which was run by Martin Nowak. The actual amount received from Epstein was US$6.5 million. Epstein was friends with and funded Gerald Edelman, Stephen Kosslyn, Danny Hillis, and Lawrence Krauss.

In 2019, Forbes deleted a 2013 article that called Epstein "one of the largest backers of cutting edge science" after The New York Times revealed that its author, Drew Hendricks, had been paid $600 to submit it falsely as his own. According to attorney Gerald B. Lefcourt, Epstein was "part of the original group that conceived of the Clinton Global Initiative", and in 2006 donated $25,000 to the Clinton Foundation. Epstein co-organized a science event with illusionist and skeptic Al Seckel called the Mindshift Conference. The conference took place in 2010 on Epstein's private island Little Saint James. In attendance were scientists Murray Gell-Mann, Leonard Mlodinow, and Gerald Jay Sussman.

The true extent of Epstein's donations is unknown. The Jeffrey Epstein VI Foundation fails to disclose information which other charities routinely disclose. In 2015, the attorney general of the state of New York was reported to be trying to gain information but was refused since the charities were based outside of the state and did not solicit in New York State. According to a New York Times investigation, an Epstein-owned charity donated $2.3 million to former Israeli prime minister Ehud Barak between 2004 and 2006, and invested $1 million in a partnership with Barak in 2015. It was reported that Barak met with Epstein "dozens of times" from 2013 onwards.

Epstein, besides making donations through the Jeffrey Epstein VI Foundation, made charitable donations through his three private charities: Epstein Interest, the C.O.U.Q. Foundation, and Gratitude America Ltd. According to federal tax filings, Epstein donated $30 million between 1998 and 2018, through these charities. Following his death, several scientists and institutions—including Harvard University and Massachusetts Institute of Technology (MIT)—came under criticism for accepting money from Epstein, with some offering to give away money donated by Epstein.

=== Interest in eugenics and transhumanism ===
Beginning in the early-2000s Epstein developed an interest in "improving" the human race through genetic engineering and artificial intelligence, including using his own sperm. He addressed the scientific community at various events and occasions and communicated his fascination with eugenics. It was reported in 2019 that Epstein had planned to "seed the human race with his DNA" by impregnating up to 20 women using his property Zorro Ranch in New Mexico as a "baby ranch", where mothers would give birth to his offspring. He was an advocate of cryonics and his idiosyncratic version of transhumanism, and said he intended to have his penis and head frozen.

In response to the Jeffrey Epstein VI Foundation donations, Kathleen Hall Jamieson, director of the Annenberg Public Policy Center at the University of Pennsylvania said: "Scientists need funding for important work ... if the funding is for legitimate scientific work, there is nothing wrong with accepting support from a billionaire. However it would have been wrong for scientists to accept his funding if they were aware that he was planning a eugenics experiment that might draw legitimacy from his association with them." Professor George Church apologized for meeting Epstein after his 13-month sentence in 2009, saying: "There should have been more conversations about, should we be doing this, should we be helping this guy? There was just a lot of nerd tunnel vision."

=== Health and wellness ===
Epstein had recurring sleep issues. Deepak Chopra consulted for Epstein in relation to his somnipathies from 2016 to 2019. In jail Epstein also experienced sleep issues and was given a continuous positive airway pressure (CPAP) machine. Epstein is believed to have been partially under the care of the longevity doctor Peter Attia.

Epstein had low testosterone levels. Ghislaine Maxwell, in a 2025 interview stated that she stated that Epstein started testosterone in the late 1990s and that it made him aggressive

== Audio recordings ==
In 2003, Bloomberg journalist David Bank spoke on Little St. James with Epstein in a 5-hour long interview, which Bank left unpublished prior to Epstein's death. In 2017, Epstein spoke in interviews, over the course of more than one hundred hours, with journalist Michael Wolff, which began to be released in November 2024, as part of Wolff's Fire and Fury podcast.

== See also ==
- Relationship of Prince Andrew and Jeffrey Epstein – British royal scandal
- Relationship of Peter Mandelson and Jeffrey Epstein – British political scandal
- Death of Jeffrey Epstein – 2019 death in custody in New York, US
- Wealth of Jeffrey Epstein
