= Wealth of Jeffrey Epstein =

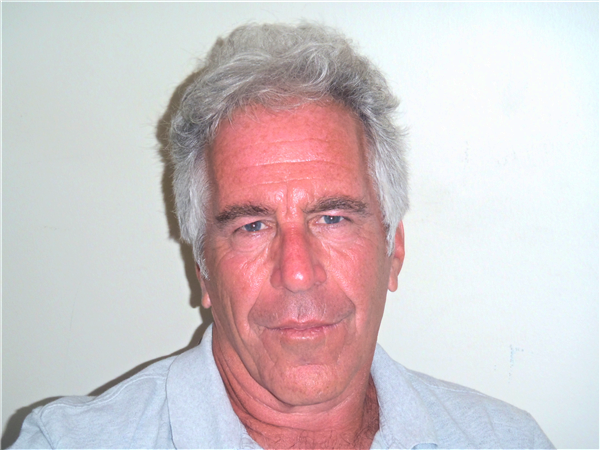
Epstein in 2016

The net worth of Jeffrey Epstein, American financier and child sex offender is not publicly known, aside from a modest $40,000/year salary during his tenure as a teacher at Dalton School. Federal prosecutors in 2019 stated in court documents that, based on claims from one financial institution, Epstein had assets worth at least $500 million and earned more than $10 million a year. The extent of his wealth, however, was unknown, since he had not filled a financial affidavit for his bail application. According to a CBS News analysis, at the time of his death, Epstein's assets totaled over $577 million.

According to Bloomberg News, "Today, so little is known about Epstein's current business or clients that the only things that can be valued with any certainty are his properties." The Miami Herald in its investigation of the Paradise Papers and Swiss Leaks documents concluded that Epstein's wealth is spread secretly across the globe.

== History ==
The Swiss Leaks documents indicated Epstein had financial accounts with millions of dollars in offshore tax havens. The Paradise Papers showed that Epstein, in 1997, became a client of Appleby, a Bermuda law firm which specialized in the creation of offshore companies and investment vehicles. A client profile of Epstein described his job cryptically as the "Manager of Fortune".

According to Forbes, Epstein's two main businesses received revenue of over $800 million between 1999 and 2018, consisting of $490 million in fees (mainly from billionaires Les Wexner, $200 million, and Leon Black, $170 million) and $310 million from investment returns. Epstein received dividends of at least $360 million from his companies during that period. According to Forbes, he was worth $578 million when he died. In 2025, Epstein's estate received $105 million in tax refunds.

In 2020, Epstein estate's finances revealed it had paid out nearly $50 million to more than 100 women who brought claims to the "Epstein Victims Compensation Fund" in the U.S. Virgin Islands. By February 2021, the estate was valued at about $240 million, down from estimates of $630 million a year earlier. This prompted Denise George (the attorney general of the U.S. Virgin Islands) to file an emergency motion seeking the immediate asset freeze. She contended in the filing, which the victims joined, that the estate executors had "mismanaged" the money.

=== Sources of wealth ===
Les Wexner was one source of Epstein's original wealth. An assistant of Epstein stated he got his fortune started through Robert Maxwell, the media mogul father of Ghislaine. When Epstein pleaded guilty in 2008 to soliciting and procuring prostitution, his lawyers stated he had a net worth of over a billion dollars.

Sources have questioned the extent of Epstein's wealth and status as a billionaire. According to The New York Times, "Epstein's fortune may be more illusion than fact". He lost "large sums of money" in the 2008 financial crisis, and "friends and patrons"—including billionaire Wexner—"deserted him" after he pled guilty to prostitution charges. New York magazine claimed "there's scant proof" of Epstein's "financial bona fides", and Forbes ran an article titled "Why sex offender Jeffrey Epstein is not a billionaire."

== Management ==
=== Offices ===
Epstein rented offices for his business dealings in the Villard House at 457 Madison Avenue. Steven Hoffenberg originally set up the offices for Epstein in 1987 when he was consulting for Tower Financial. Epstein used these offices until at least 2003. Around this time, Wolff saw the financier in his office, which in the past were the offices of Random House. Wolff noted that Epstein's offices were a strange place which did not have a corporate feel. Wolff stated that the offices were "almost European. It's old—old-fashioned, unrehabbed in its way." Wolff continued that "the trading floor is filled with guys in yarmulkes. Who they are, I have no idea. They're like a throwback, a bunch of guys from the fifties. So here is Jeffrey in this incredibly beautiful office, with pieces of art and a view of the courtyard, and he seems like the most relaxed guy in the world. You want to say 'What's going on here?' and he gives you that Cheshire smile."

Over the years Epstein housed friends at 11 East 71st Street, including ex-girlfriend Eva Andersson, now married to his hedge-fund friend Glenn Dubin, and former Israeli prime minister Ehud Barak. He housed some of his workers, including his pilot, housekeeper and office work staff, in the apartment complex. Epstein has housed underage girls.

=== Estate ===
Epstein's will appointed Darren Indyke, Epstein's attorney, and Richard Kahn, Epstein's accountant, as the executors of his estate. Prior to his appointment as executor, Indyke had worked for Epstein in various capacities since at least 1995, while Kahn had worked as Epstein's accountant since 2005.In 2019, both men were listed by the FBI as co-conspirators of Epstein, but neither Indyke nor Kahn were charged with any crimes. Croatian-born venture capitalist Boris Nikolic, a former science advisor to Bill Gates, was named as a backup executor in the will. Nikolic has said that he did not consent to being named as an executor. Under Indyke and Kahn, the value of the estate has depreciated by up to 80 percent of its value at the time of Epstein's death. Ongoing costs decreasing the estate's value have included taxes, property upkeep, and legal costs.

=== Banking ===
According to Reuters, Epstein maintained access to major financial institutions even after his 2008 conviction. Deutsche Bank continued servicing his accounts into 2019, while Morgan Stanley opened accounts tied to his trusts that same year.

JPMorgan serviced Epstein and Ghislaine Maxwell from 1998 to 2013 before terminating the relationship. Deutsche Bank then handled Epstein's accounts from 2013 to 2019, ultimately closing them after his arrest in July 2019. At the same time, Morgan Stanley maintained ties to Epstein-linked entities between 2015 and 2019. The Epstein files show the bank opened and funded accounts for his trusts during this period, and these relationships continued into 2019 despite an internal decision to terminate them in 2017. One account opened in 2019 was reportedly closed shortly afterward.

== Residences ==
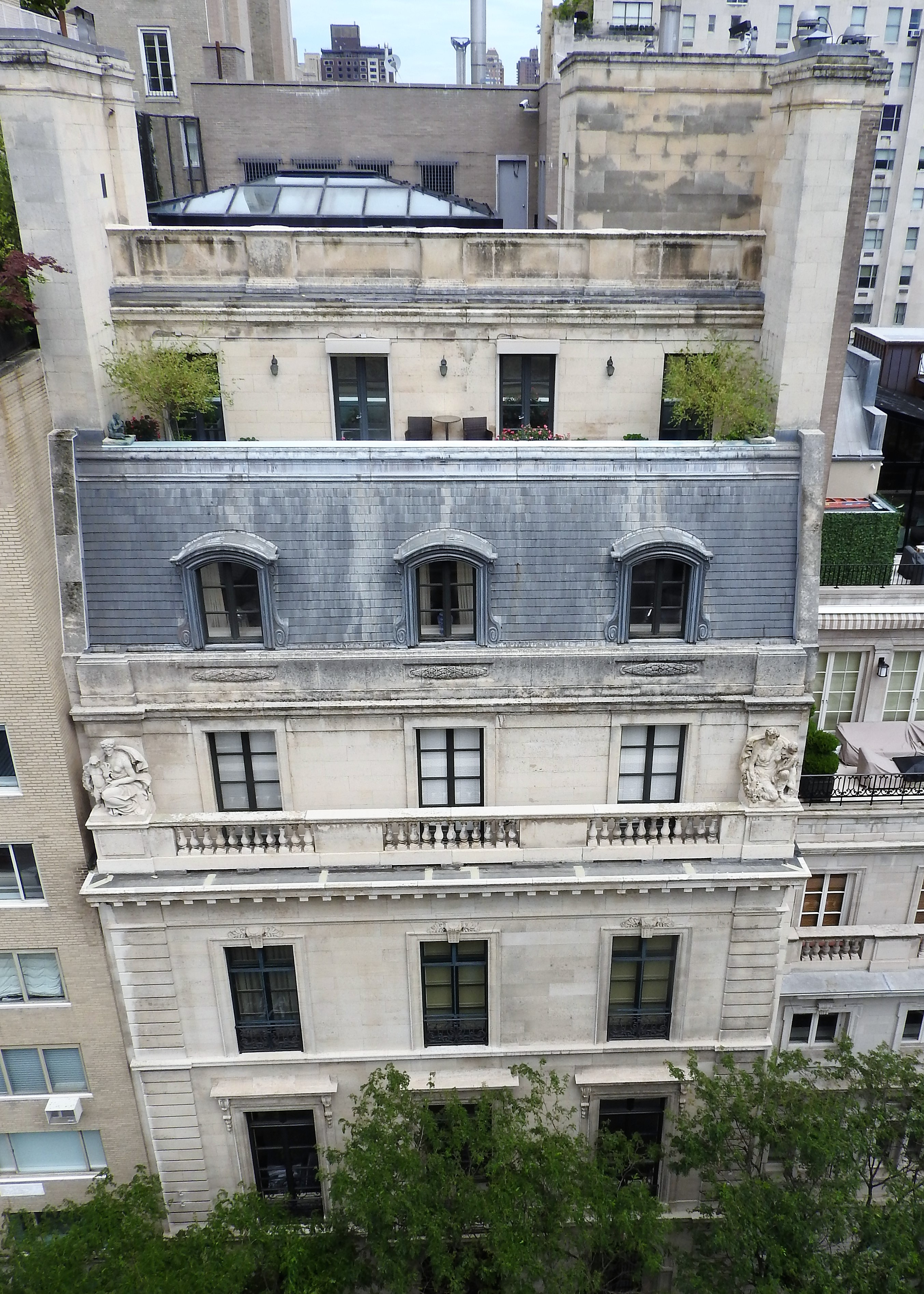
Herbert N. Straus House on the Upper East Side

In a 2003 interview Epstein said: "I can't be totally wacko in what I do. It affects lots of other people who will get angry with what I do because then it affects me again. But on my own island or on my own ranch, I can think the thoughts I want to think. I can do the work I want to do and I'm free to explore as I see fit."

=== Southern District of New York ===
Epstein owned the Herbert N. Straus House on 9 East 71st Street on the Upper East Side of Manhattan in New York. It was originally purchased for $13 million in 1989 by Epstein's mentor, Les Wexner, who renovated it. Epstein moved into it in 1995 after Wexner moved with his wife to Columbus, Ohio. He took full possession in 1998, when he paid Wexner $20 million. The house was valued in 2019 by federal prosecutors at $77 million, while the city assessed it at $56 million. The mansion is reputedly the largest private residence in Manhattan at 21,000 sq ft (2,000 m^{2}).

It has a lead-lined bathroom fitted with CCTV screens and a telephone. The house has a heated sidewalk to melt away snow. Previously, Epstein resided in a spacious townhouse, which was a former Iranian government building taken over by the State Department during the Iranian revolution, at 34 East 69th Street. He leased it for a rate of $15,000 a month between 1992 and 1995.

Before the Herbert Straus house was sold to Epstein by Wexner, Wexner purchased in 1988 the adjacent townhouse at 11 East 71st Street. As in the case of the Herbert Straus house, Epstein was on the deed of the 11 East 71st Street house as the trustee. 11 East 71st Street, was sold in 1998 to Howard Lutnick, Trump's secretary of commerce, who still owns it as of 2025.

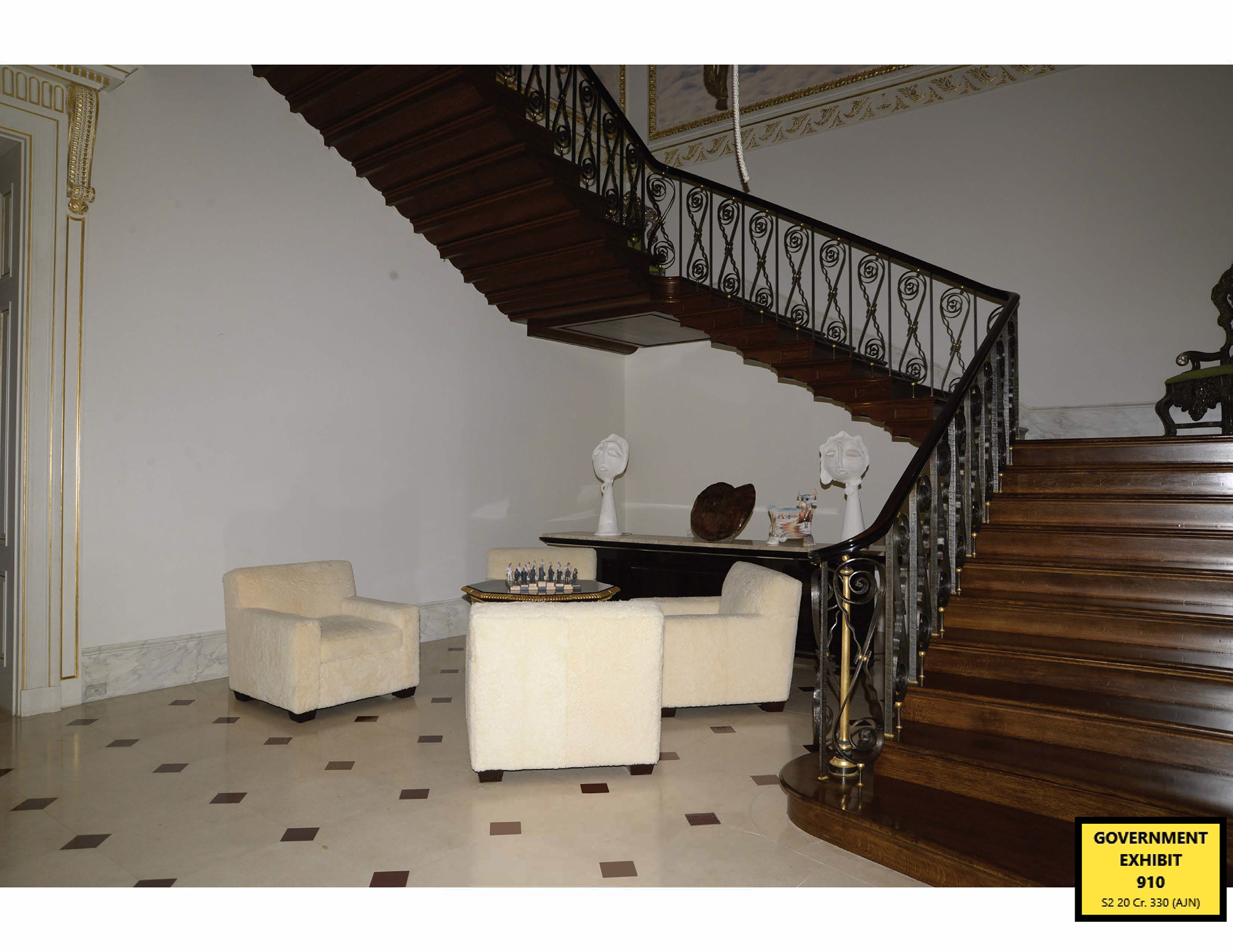

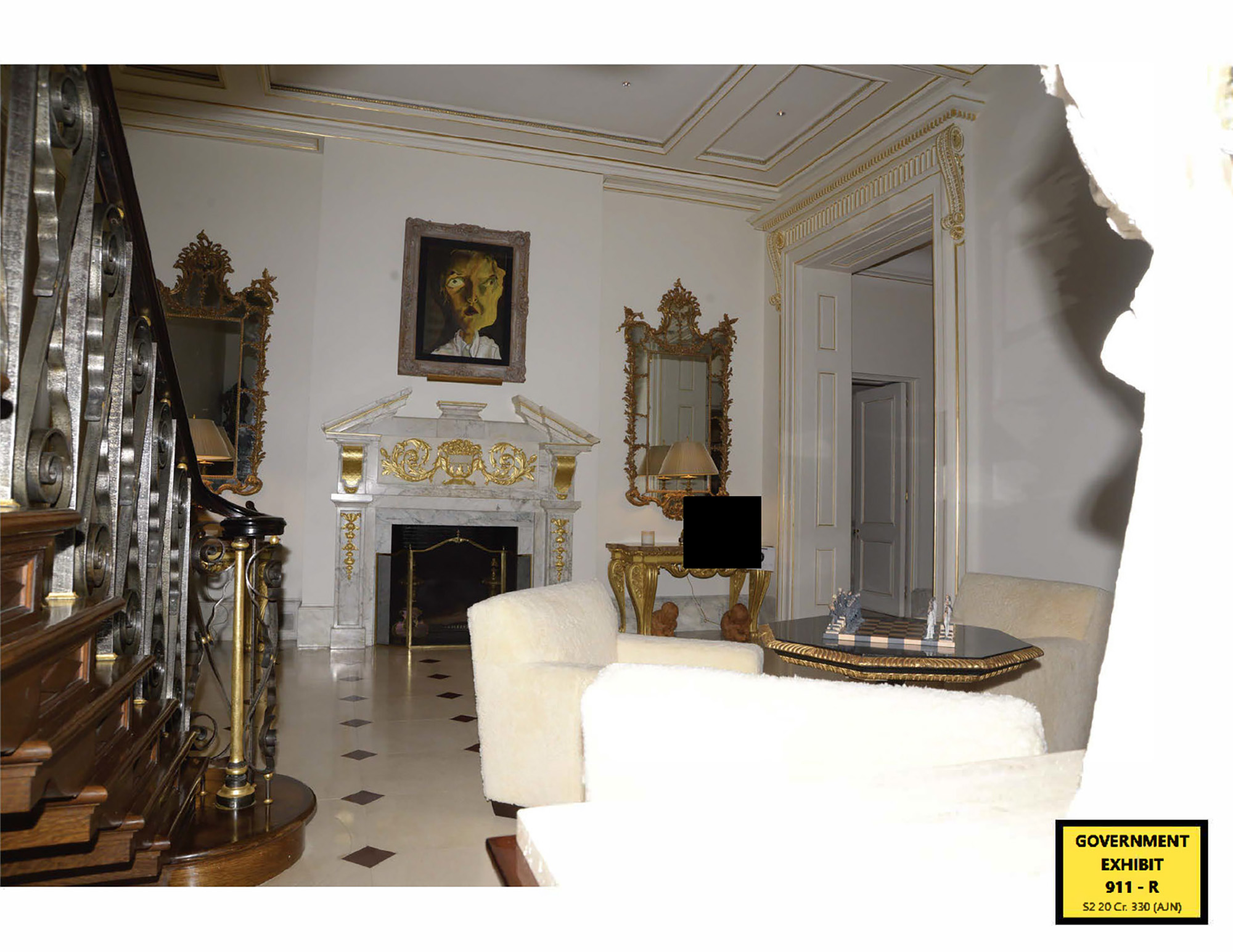

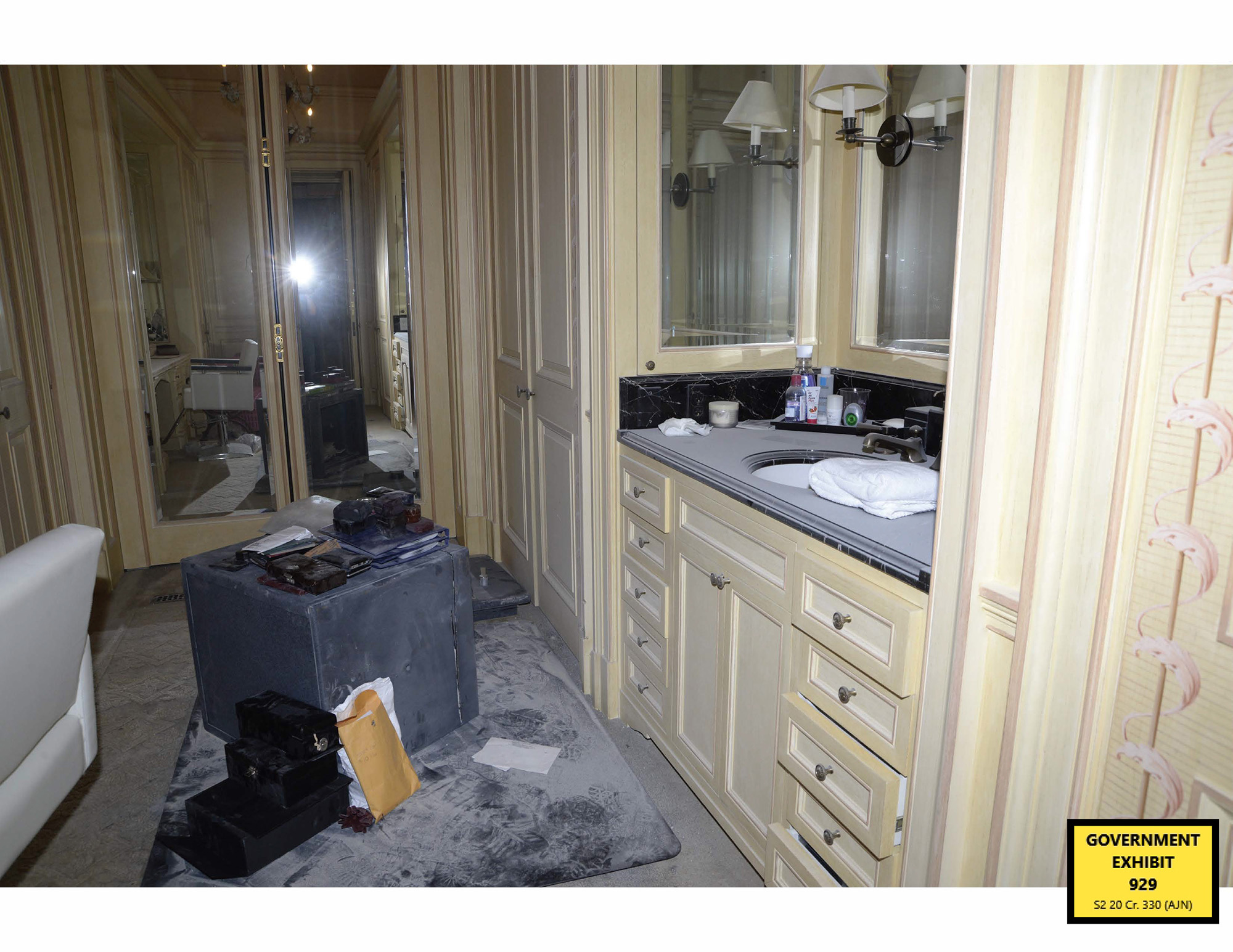

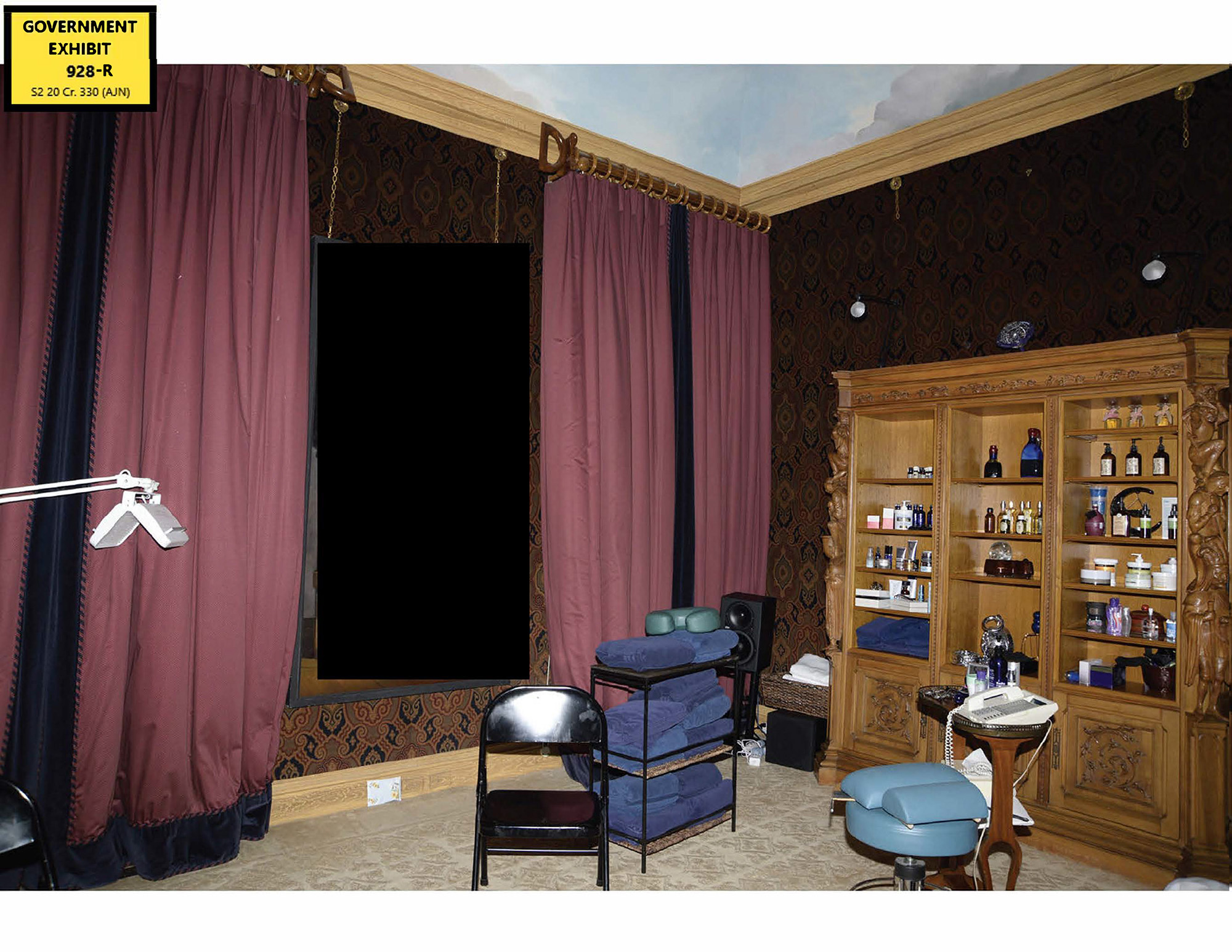

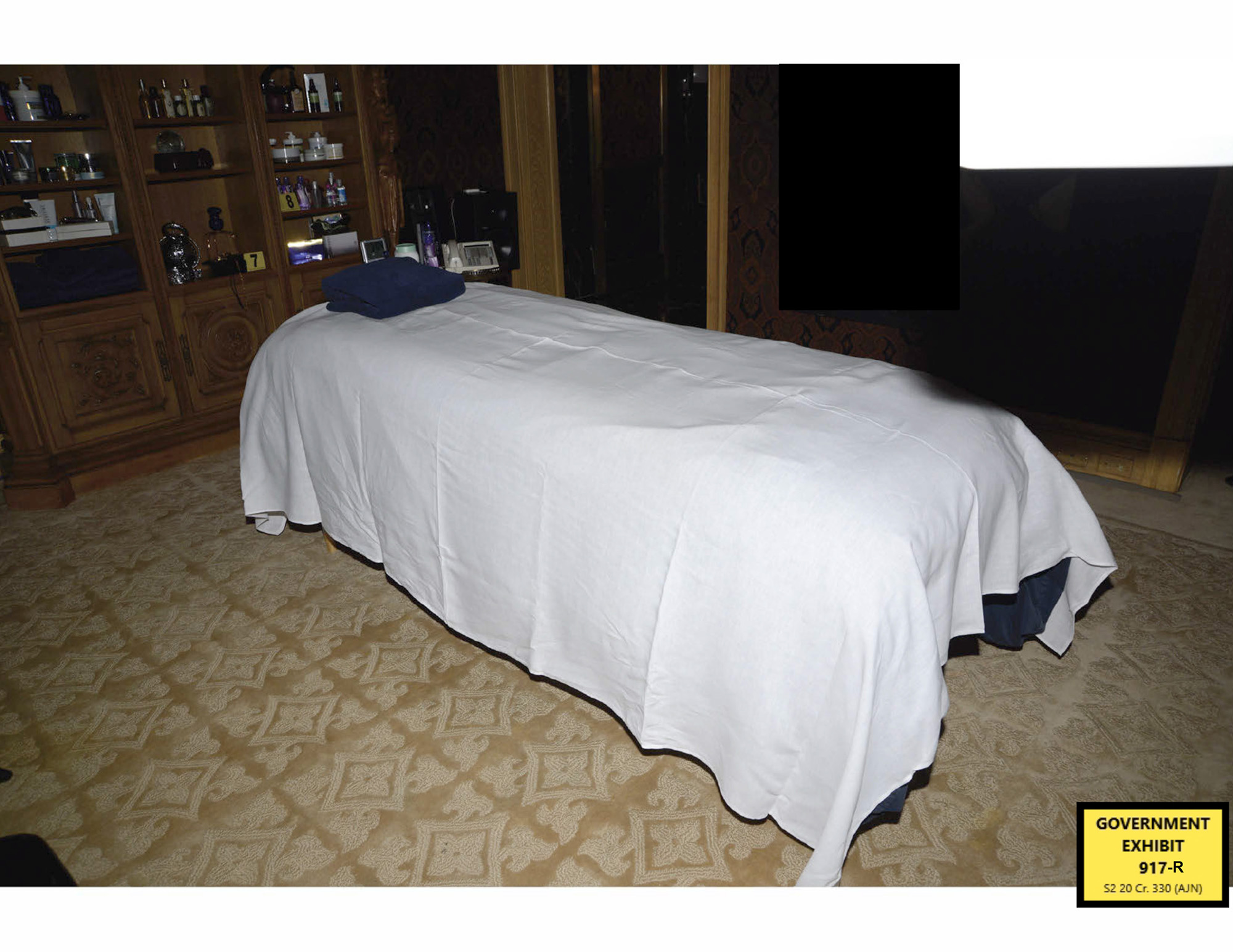

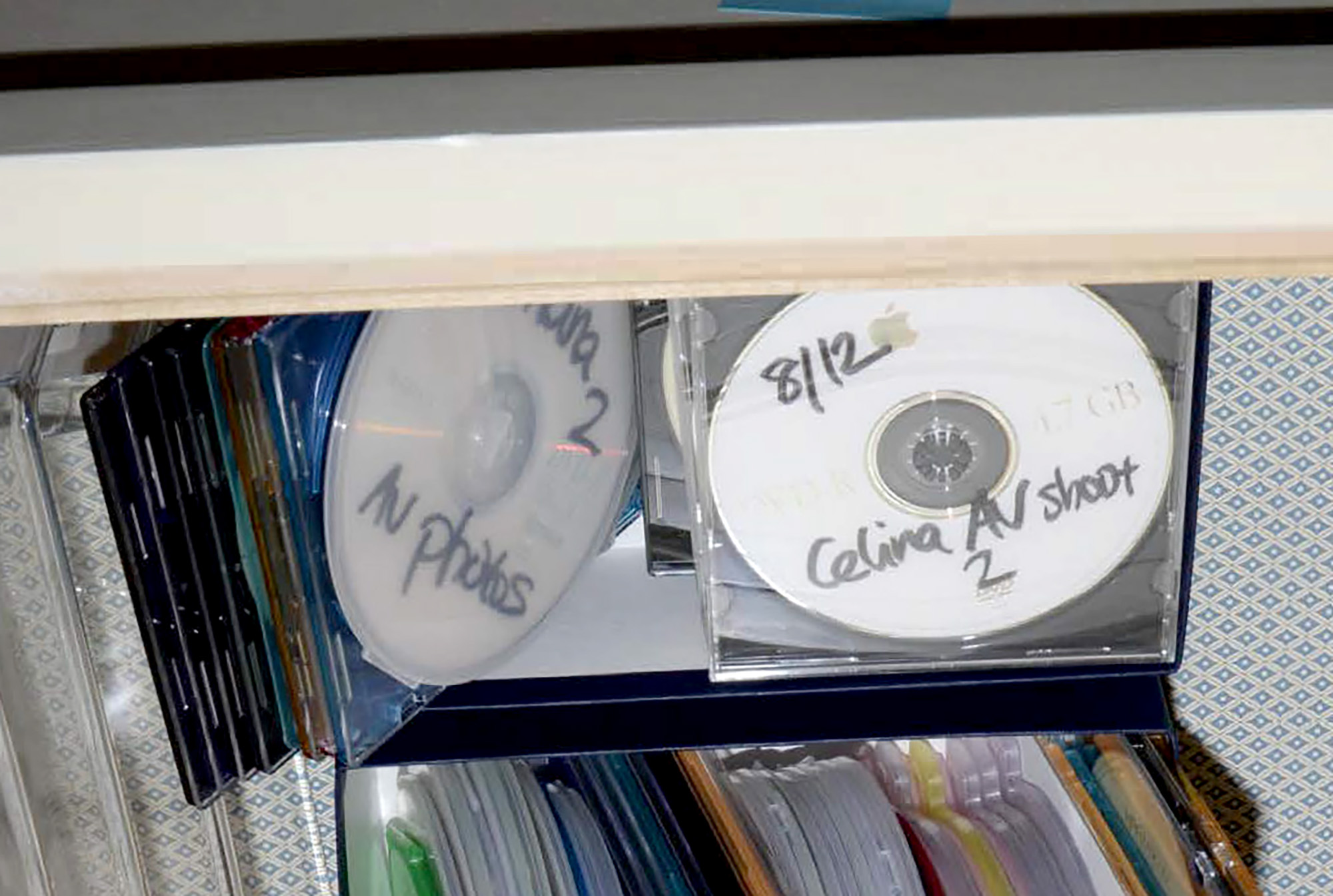

=== U.S. Virgin Islands ===
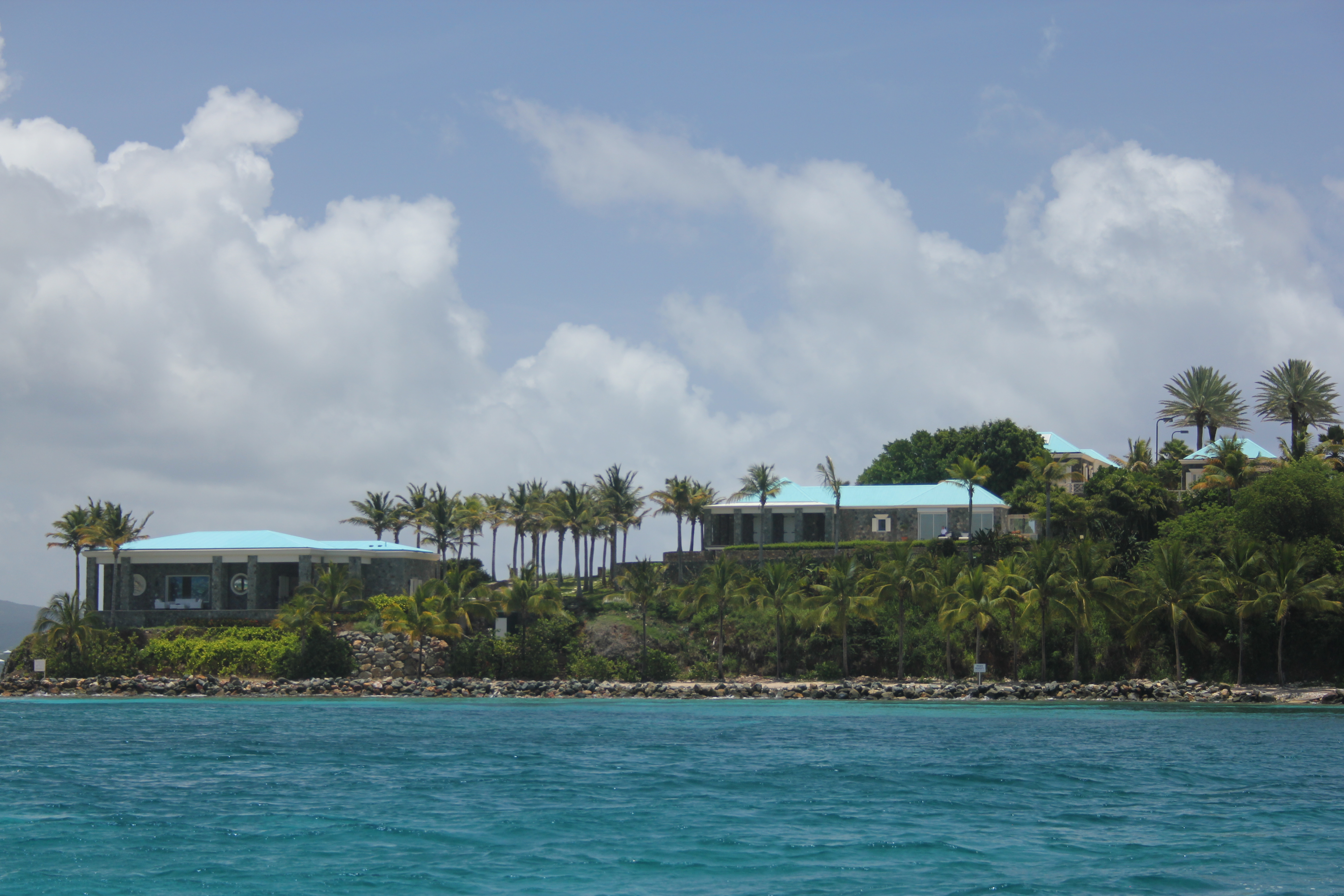
Epstein's private island of Little St. James in the U.S. Virgin Islands

Epstein owned two islands in the U.S. Virgin Islands: Little Saint James, a private island near Saint Thomas purchased in 1998 which includes a mansion and guest houses, and the neighboring island of Great Saint James purchased in 2016. It came to light after his second arrest that Epstein owned 50% of the American Yacht Harbour at Red Hook; the other half was owned by Trump associate Andrew Farkas. The partnership came about in 2007 when Epstein was having financial and legal problems.

Epstein structured financial shells called Financial Trust Company (FTC) and Southern Trust around his activities there; this Trust's bank was JPMorgan Chase and it settled a lawsuit with the attorney general there in 2022 for $105 million over allegations it helped a criminal enterprise to prosper. Southern Trust "made fraudulent misrepresentations to the Virgin Islands Economic Development Authority regarding its qualifications for Economic development corporation tax benefits." The bank said the Trust obtained $300 million in tax credits, and paid the U.S. Virgin Islands police. Epstein's estate was nearing settlement of another lawsuit filed by the attorney general in 2022.

The FTC generated fee income from 2000 to 2006 of $300 million. FTC's main business was attentive to Wexner. After the two men fell out in 2007 and over the next six years, the FTC generated less than $5 million. The FTC was Epstein's primary source of income for the earlier period. The Southern Trust was attentive to the needs of Leon Black, and this trust business was set up in 2013 as the result of discussions between the principals. Southern Trust was headquartered at American Yacht Harbour, and was a "DSB-Providing extensive DNA database & data mining" according to filings.

In 2023, Attorney-general of the U.S. Virgin Islands Denise George was fired by Governor Albert Bryan Jr. days after she filed charges against JPMorgan Chase over Epstein and his Southern Trust, which she characterized as a criminal enterprise. The wife of the Democratic governor of the USVI from 2007 to 2015, John de Jongh, was employed by the Southern Trust, in addition to being on the board of directors of the Jeffrey Epstein VI Foundation. Stephen Deckoff bought Epstein's islands in 2023 for $60 million.

=== Southern District of Florida ===
Epstein had a 14,000-square-foot, six-bedroom residence at 358 El Brillo Way in Palm Beach, Florida, which he purchased in 1990. It is two miles north of Mar-a-Lago and was bought for $19 million in 2021 by a property developer who demolished it and changed the address. Ann Coulter maintains that the state attorney for Palm Beach in 2006, Barry Krischer, treated Epstein lightly after the police investigation turned up 17 girls who signed affidavits against him. Under Krischer, the state grand jury indicted him for solitication. After federal attorney Alex Acosta became involved, Epstein pled guilty to procuring a person under 18 for prostitution and was punished by day-release.

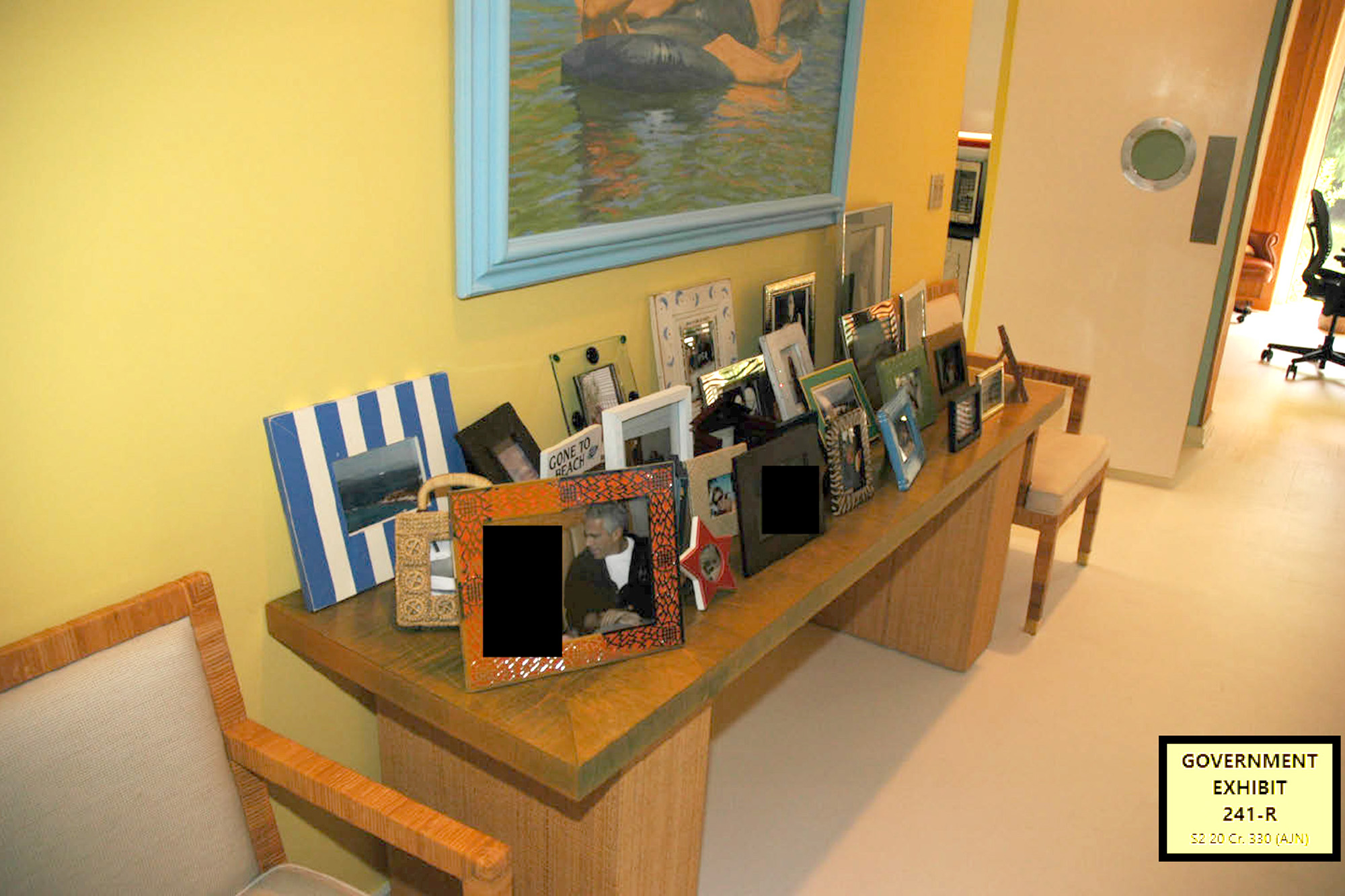

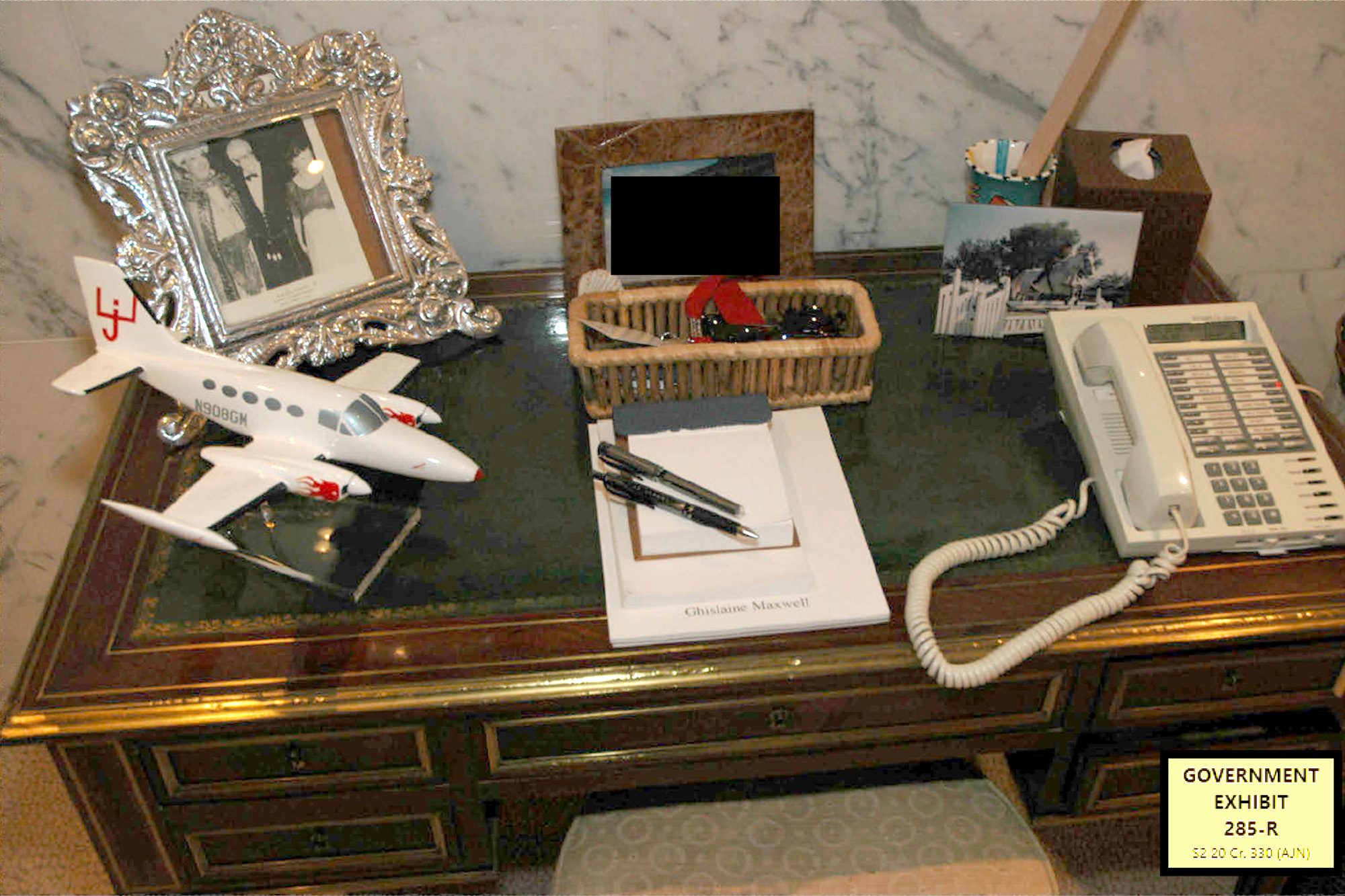

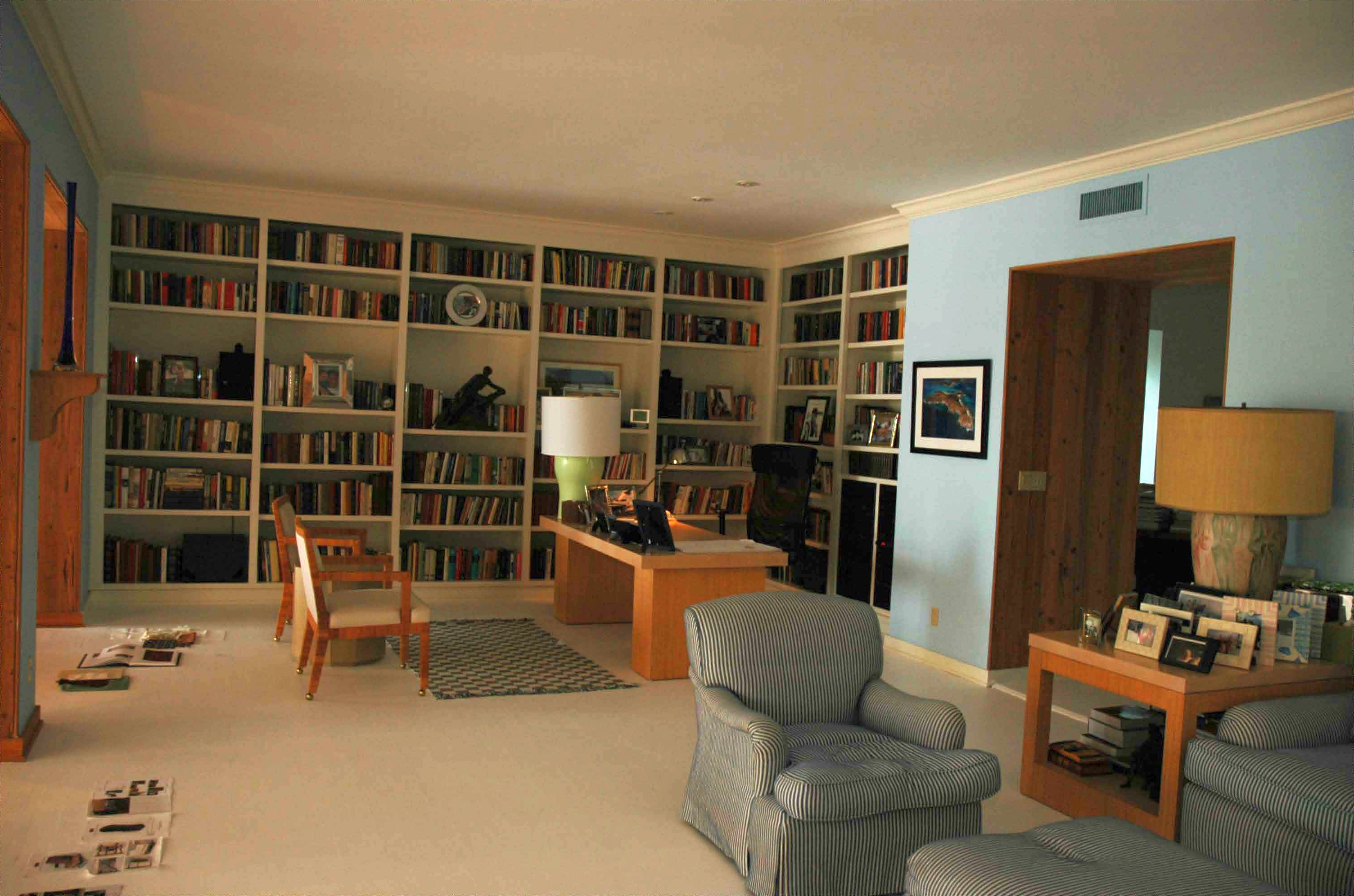

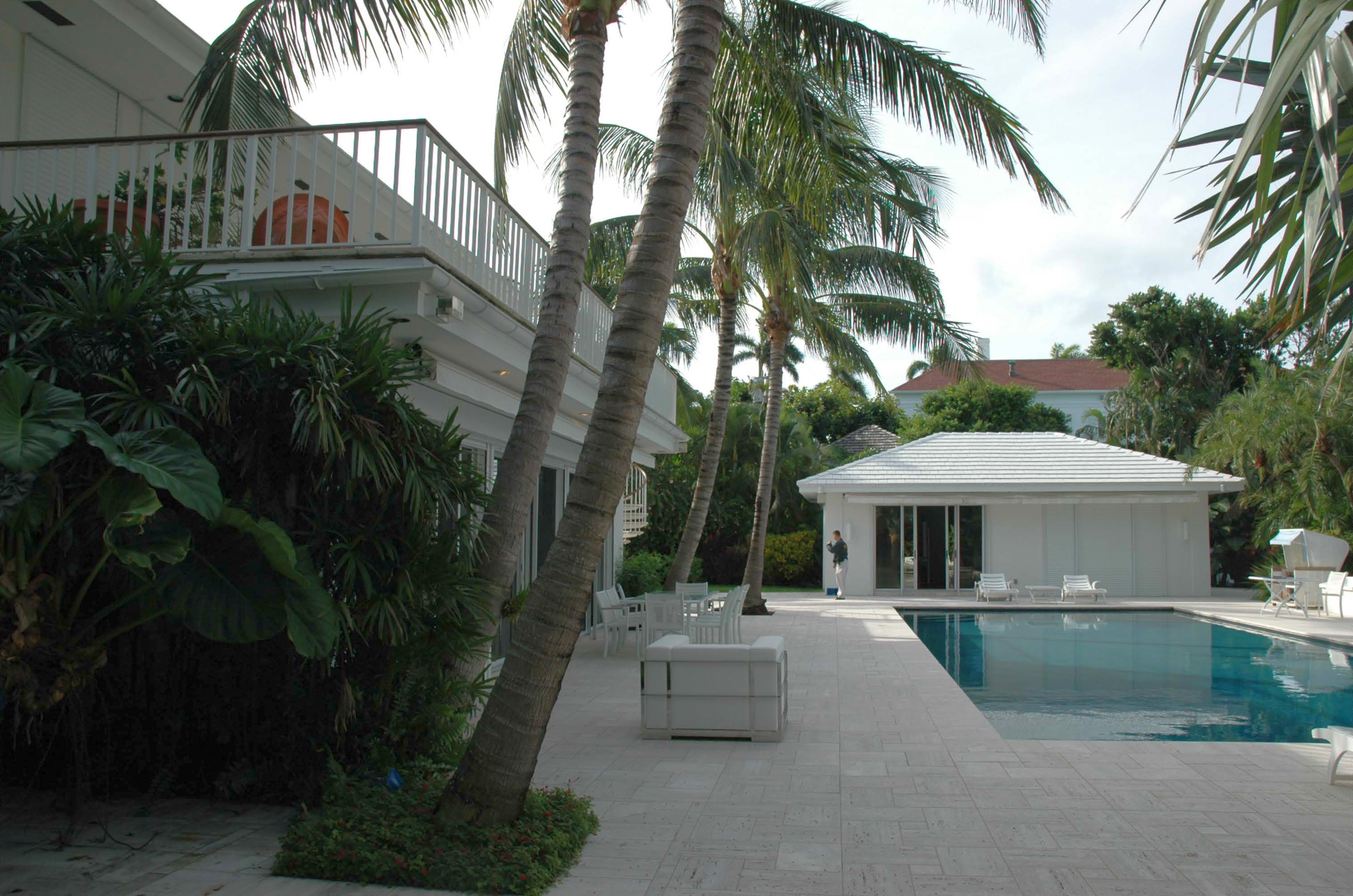

=== Other properties ===
Epstein had a 7,500-acre (30 km^{2}) ranch named Zorro Ranch near Stanley, New Mexico, purchased in 1993 for roughly $12 million. Epstein owned a mansion outside Columbus, Ohio, at 5025 East Dublin Granville Road near Wexner's home, from 1992 to 1998, which he purchased from his mentor. It was there that he and Maxwell allegedly molested Marie Farmer who was prevented from leaving by his security guards, although that allegation was not tested in court because of the settlement she signed with Epstein's estate before trial. Farmer said she was rescued by her father 12 hours after her illegal detention. Epstein possessed seven units in an apartment building near the Arc de Triomphe in Paris.

== Philanthropy ==
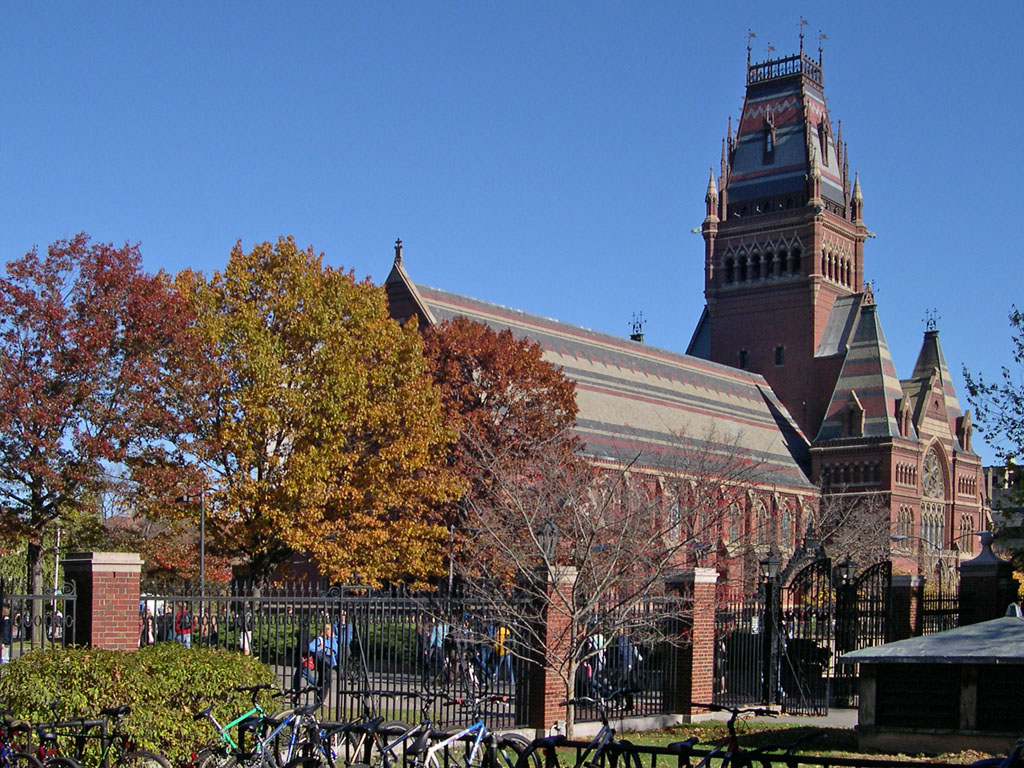
Epstein donated millions of dollars to Harvard University over the years for different causes.

In 2000, Epstein founded the Jeffrey Epstein VI Foundation, which was a private foundation. The foundation sometimes went by the name Enhanced Education, but was officially registered as J. Epstein VI Foundation. The "VI" stood for Virgin Islands, as the foundation was based on the Epstein-owned Little Saint James within the archipelago. Epstein, besides making donations through the Jeffrey Epstein VI Foundation, made charitable donations through his three private charities: Epstein Interest, the COUQ Foundation, and Gratitude America Ltd.

The true extent of Epstein's donations is unknown. The Jeffrey Epstein VI Foundation fails to disclose information which other charities routinely disclose. In 2015, the attorney general of the state of New York was reported to be trying to gain information but was refused since the charities were based outside of the state and did not solicit in New York State.

=== Education ===
In 1991, Epstein was one of four donors who pledged to raise US$2 million for a Hillel student building Rosovsky Hall at Harvard University. In the 1990s, Epstein donated $10,000 to the White House Historical Association.

Prior to 2003, the foundation funded Martin Nowak's research at the Institute for Advanced Study in Princeton, New Jersey. In 2003, Epstein pledged donations totaling US$30 million to create a mathematical biology and evolutionary dynamics program at Harvard which was run by Martin Nowak. The actual amount received from Epstein was US$6.5 million. Epstein was friends with and funded Gerald Edelman, Stephen Kosslyn, Danny Hillis, and Lawrence Krauss.

According to federal tax filings, Epstein donated $30 million between 1998 and 2018, through these charities. Following his death, several scientists and institutions—including Harvard University and Massachusetts Institute of Technology (MIT)—came under criticism for accepting money from Epstein, with some offering to give away money donated by Epstein.

=== Science ===
In 2019, Forbes deleted a 2013 article that called Epstein "one of the largest backers of cutting edge science" after The New York Times revealed that its author, Drew Hendricks, had been paid $600 to submit it falsely as his own. According to attorney Gerald B. Lefcourt, Epstein was "part of the original group that conceived of the Clinton Global Initiative", and in 2006 donated $25,000 to the Clinton Foundation. Epstein co-organized a science event with illusionist and skeptic Al Seckel called the Mindshift Conference. The conference took place in 2010 on Epstein's private island Little Saint James. In attendance were scientists Murray Gell-Mann, Leonard Mlodinow, and Gerald Jay Sussman.

=== Other ===
According to a New York Times investigation, an Epstein-owned charity donated $2.3 million to former Israeli prime minister Ehud Barak between 2004 and 2006, and invested $1 million in a partnership with Barak in 2015. It was reported that Barak met with Epstein "dozens of times" from 2013 onwards.
