= Properties of Jeffrey Epstein =

Properties owned by Jeffrey Epstein

The American financier and convicted sex offender Jeffrey Epstein maintained a number of properties and estates from 1990, acquiring multiple properties until his death in 2019.

== United States ==
=== New York City (1988–1996, 1998–2021) ===
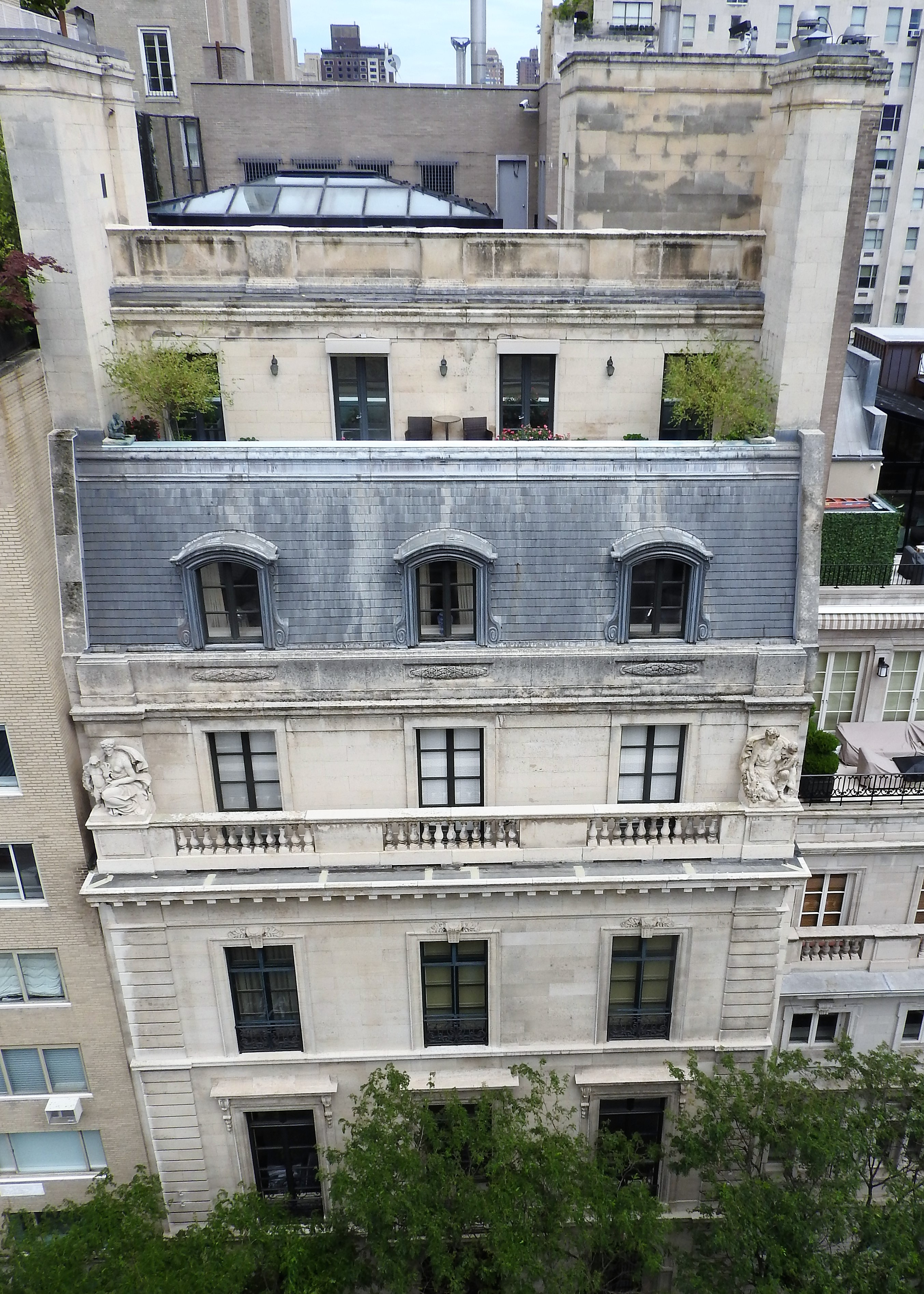
Epstein's former townhouse in Manhattan

Epstein owned two notable Manhattan properties, both previously owned by his client and business partner, Les Wexner. Separately, Epstein's brother Mark Epstein also bought lucrative New York City property from Wexner.

In 1987, Mark Epstein created his first corporation to invest in real estate. He bought and/or managed several of Wexner's properties, including the condominium on East 66th Street which Jeffrey Epstein used to house models, associates, girlfriends, and employees.

In 1988, a corporation registered at Wexner's address bought 11 East 71st Street. This is a three-story home next door to the Herbert N. Straus House that was Epstein's primary Manhattan residence. On the deed, Epstein was listed as the corporation's vice president. In 1992, the corporation transferred the property to a trust in Epstein's name, and then in 1996 the trust sold the property to another trust for $6.2 million. In 1998, Howard Lutnick bought the home from the trust for $7.6 million.

Epstein's primary Manhattan residence was a grand townhouse on Manhattan's Upper East Side: the Herbert N. Straus House, located at 9 East 71st Street. Wexner bought it in 1989 for $13.2 million. In 1998, Epstein purchased the property through a corporation for $20 million, paid in installments through March 2000. In 2011, Wexner transferred the title to Maple Inc., one of Epstein's companies based in the US Virgin Islands. Michael Daffey, a former Goldman Sachs executive, bought the townhome in March 2021 for $51 million, and just under that amount was transferred to Epstein's estate and the victim's compensation fund.

=== Palm Beach, Florida (1990–2021) ===
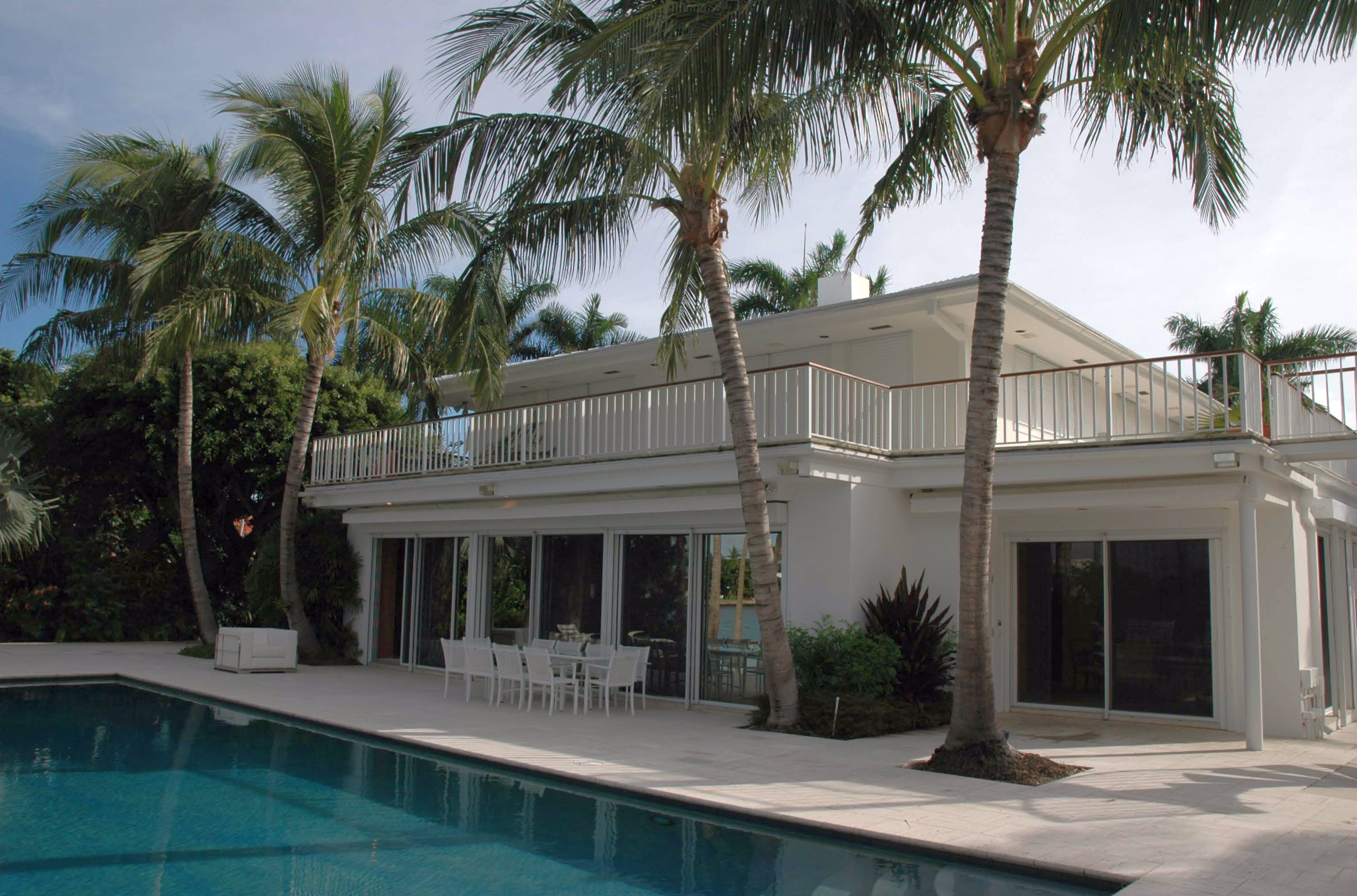
Epstein's former Palm Beach home

Epstein bought a 14,000-square-foot house at 358 El Brillo Way in Palm Beach for $2.5 million in 1990. This was the house local police searched in 2005 as part of their investigation that led to Epstein's 2008 conviction. In 2019, his estate valued the house at $12.4 million. Todd Michael Glaser, a local developer, bought it in January 2021 for $18.5 million with proceeds of the sale going to the victims' compensation fund. Glaser had the house demolished, changed the address, and then sold the empty lot for $26 million later that year.

=== New Albany, Ohio (1993–1998, 1994–2007) ===
Epstein owned at least two properties in New Albany, Ohio, the town Les Wexner helped to grow, beginning in the 1990s.

In 1993, Epstein bought 5025 East Dublin Granville Road, a 4-bedroom home less than a mile from Wexner's estate, for $3.5 million. In 1998, Epstein sold the home for $8 million to a real estate holding company with the same address as one of Wexner's companies. This home was identified in Maria Farmer's civil lawsuit with claims of sexual assault.

In 1994, Epstein bought a smaller home at 7558 King George Drive for $365,000. In 2007, he transferred the deed to a trust for Wexner's wife for $0. In 2011, her trust sold the home for $365,000.

=== Stanley, New Mexico (1993–2023) ===
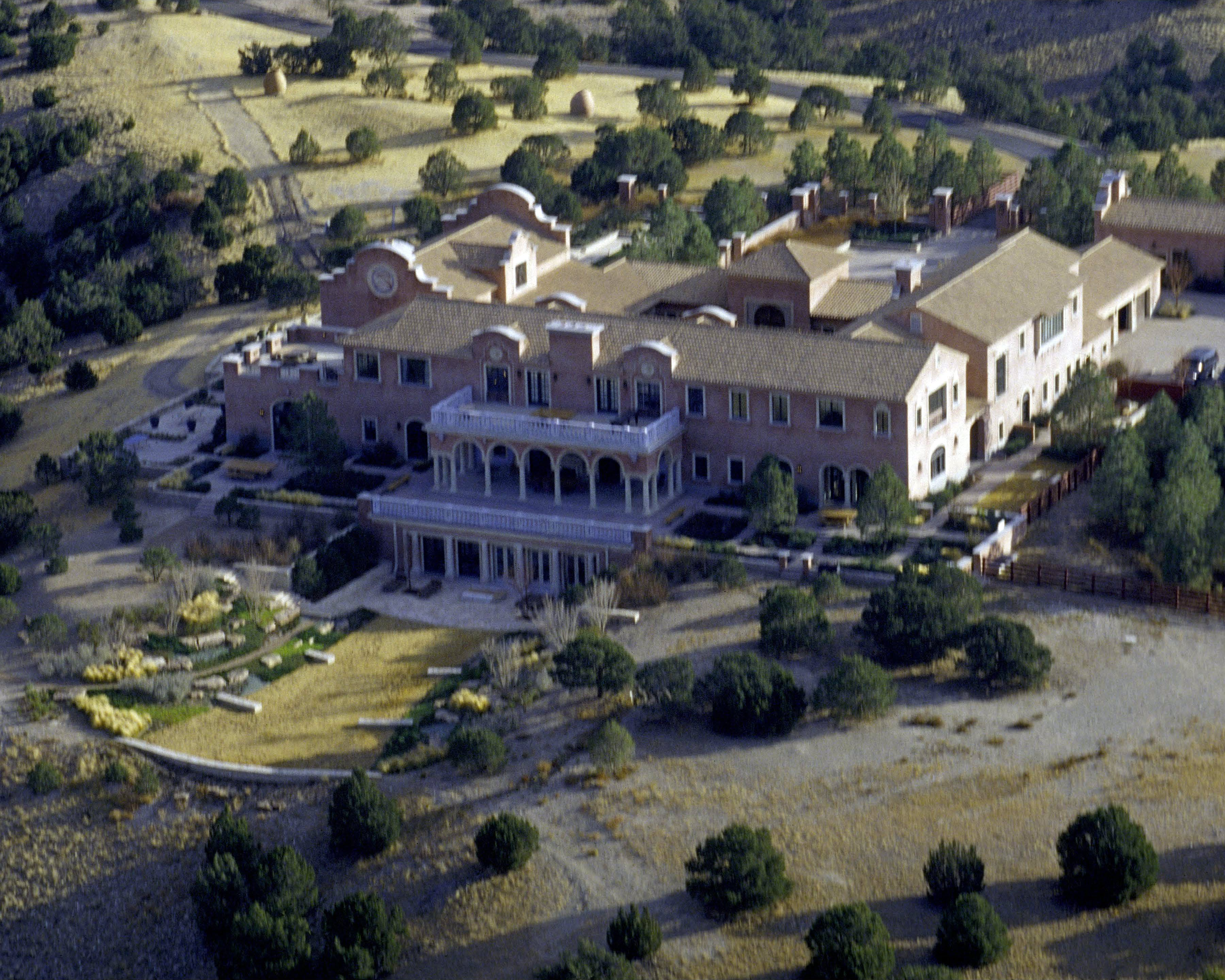
Zorro Ranch

In 1993, Epstein bought the 10,000-acre Zorro Ranch for an estimated $12 million. The ranch was owned by the family of former governor Bruce King, and it included a 30,000-square-foot main residence and several smaller homes, horse stables, and airstrip, and a greenhouse. In 2019, Epstein's estate valued the ranch at $17.2 million, before New Mexico's land commissioner cancelled the lease of an additional 1,243 acres of state trust land that bordered the ranch and was improperly used as a privacy buffer. In 2023, Don Huffines created a limited liability company to buy the ranch while keeping his name secret. Huffines bought it for an undisclosed amount and said that proceeds of the sale were used for "estate administration, including payment of creditors." He renamed the ranch Rancho de San Rafael.

=== U.S. Virgin Islands (1998–2023) ===
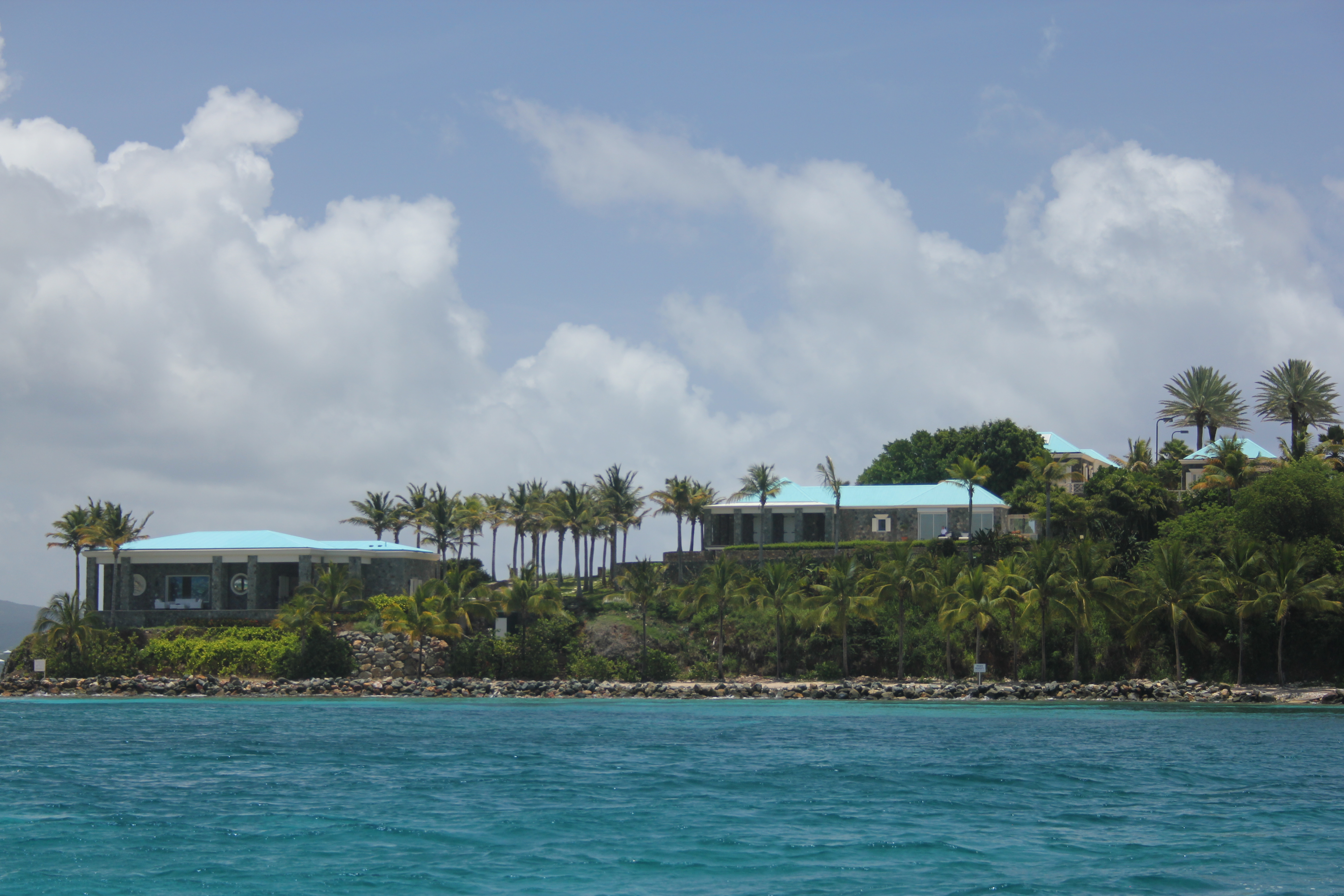
Little Saint James, also known as Epstein's Island

In 1998, Epstein bought the 72-acre Little Saint James island for about $8 million, turning it into a private retreat with a main house, guest villas, pools, and beaches. This has been called "pedophile island" because Epstein allegedly used it as the headquarters for sex trafficking.

In 2016, Epstein bought the neighboring 165-acre Great Saint James for $22.55 million. This island further shielded his activities at the smaller island from the public and law enforcement.

In 2019, Epstein's estate valued the two islands together at $31 million. In 2022, the estate settled with the US Virgin Island government, paying over $105 million to return tax benefits they'd extended to him and to repair environmental damage Epstein did when razing structures on Great St. James. In 2023, private equity billionaire Stephen Deckoff bought the two islands for $60 million, with $30 million going to the US Virgin Islands government for a trust to provide services for sexual abuse and trafficking victims. He plans to build a 25-room luxury resort on the islands.

=== Vail, Colorado (1998–2019) ===
Elizabeth Ross "Libet" Johnson (1950–2017) was one of the heirs to the Johnson & Johnson fortune as she was Robert Wood Johnson III's daughter. In the mid-1990s, Epstein worked as Johnson's financial advisor. In 1994, she gave more than $2 million to the J. Epstein Foundation and also bought a piece of property in Vail, Colorado for $5.6 million. In 1996, she had a 7,738-square-foot European-style ski chalet built that sleeps 18 people, with seven en-suite bedrooms, and direct access to two ski resorts.

In May 1998, Johnson established The Elizabeth Ross Johnson Amended and Restated Revocable Trust, with only herself and Epstein as trustees. Several months later, Johnson transferred the deed to her Vail home to the trust. She stopped contact with Epstein in the late 1990s, but his name remained in the trust until after his death. Johnson died in 2017 and the estate passed down to Johnson's heirs. Epstein died in 2019, and the home was sold in 2021 for $24 million.

Although Epstein was a trustee, Johnson still had use of her home.

== France ==
=== Paris (2001–2022) ===
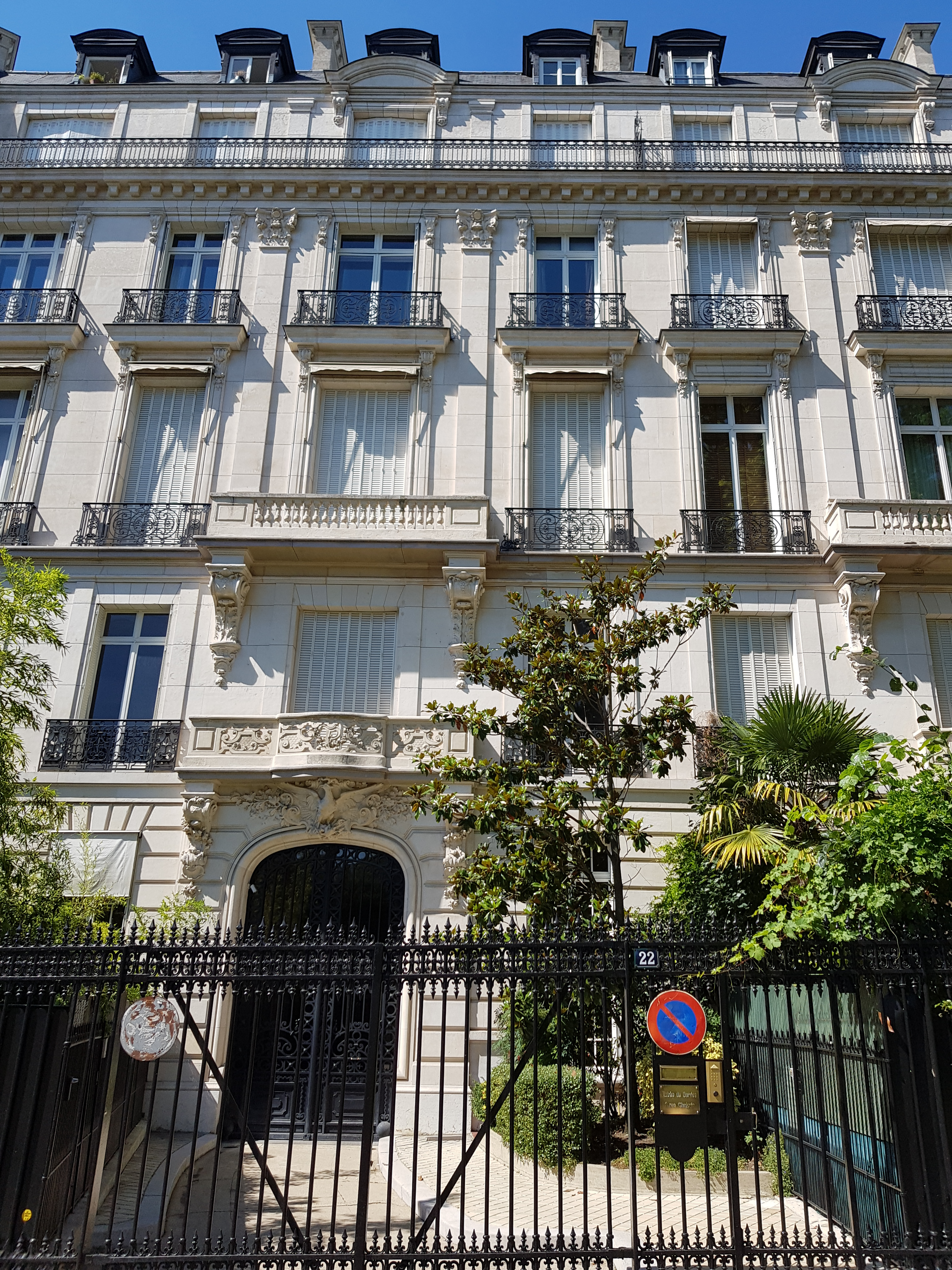
Paris apartment

In 2001, Epstein bought a 685 square meter (7,373 square foot) apartment at 22 Avenue Foch in Paris's 16th arrondissement for $3.2 million. On the prestigious second floor were three units with views of the Arc de Triomphe. The fifth floor had two other units, and there were two cellars in the basement. Epstein was returning to the US from this apartment when he was arrested in July 2019. This is the home French police searched in September 2019 when investigating Epstein's associate, Jean-Luc Brunel.

In 2019, Epstein's estate valued the apartment at $8.7 million. In 2022, Bulgarian businessman Georgi Tuchev bought it for $10 million, stating that part of the proceeds would be paid out to Epstein's victims.

== Brazil ==
=== São Paulo (2003–2005) ===
In 2003, Epstein bought a 93-square meter (1,001 square foot) condominium in the upper-class Vila Olímpia neighborhood of São Paulo. Epstein paid R$245,000 for the property. In 2005, he sold it for R$179,300 to model and fashion entrepreneur Ana Maria Gomes Macedo. Epstein and Macedo exchanged friendly emails from 2006–2011, with the model expressing love for Epstein and asking him for financial help with her business.

== United Kingdom ==
=== London, England (before 2011–2019) ===
Epstein rented and maintained at least four flats in the affluent Kensington and Chelsea boroughs of London. He used these flats to house women, providing them with visas, monthly allowances, and courses of study. The flats were sometimes overcrowded, with some women sleeping on sofas. In return for the accommodations, the women were pressured into recruiting other women for Epstein, and had to repay the money if they refused. Many of the women came from Russia, eastern Europe, and elsewhere; Epstein paid for their Eurostar tickets to transport them from Paris to the flats, using the reduced "youth" fares when possible. Other women arrived on commercial and private flights.

== Morocco ==
=== Marrakesh (sale pending upon arrest) ===
The day before his arrest, Epstein sent a wire transfer for $14.9 million to buy the Bin Ennakhil palace in the Palmeraie neighborhood. He had been in negotiations for this property since 2011. When he made a low offer to the owner, German waste magnate Gunter Kiss, the owner refused to deal with him again. Thereafter, Epstein's fiancé Karyna Shuliak pretended to be acting on behalf of Epstein's billionaire investor friend, Leon Black to continue property inspections.

The money transfer was part of $27.7 million that Charles Schwab Corporation wired to a Moroccan realtor on Epstein's behalf. Three days after his arrest (on July 9), Epstein's accountant Richard Kahn canceled the wire transfer and the purchase. On July 13, Schwab flagged the payments in a suspicious activity report to the US Treasury.

The estate has a palace, 60 marble fountains, marble courtyards, and gold salons among more than 2,000 palm trees on the 4.6 hectares (11.4 acres) property.
