= Jeffrey Epstein VI Foundation =

Private foundation

- J. Epstein Virgin Islands Foundation, Inc.
- Formation: 2000; 26 years ago
- Founder: Jeffrey Epstein
- Dissolved: 2019; 7 years ago
- Type: Philanthropy
- Tax ID no.: 66-0585379
- Legal status: Defunct Private Foundation
- Purpose: Funding science and education, philanthropy
- Professional title: Enhanced Education
- Headquarters: 6100 Red Hook Quarter, Suite B-3
- Location: Saint Thomas, U.S. Virgin Islands, United States
- Vice President: Darren Indyke
- Website: jeffreyepsteinfoundation.com (archived)

The Jeffrey Epstein VI Foundation was a private foundation established in 2000 by New York convicted sex offender and disgraced financier Jeffrey Epstein. The foundation sometimes went by the name Enhanced Education, but was officially registered as J. Epstein VI Foundation. The "VI" stood for Virgin Islands, as the foundation was based on the Epstein-owned Little Saint James within the archipelago.

== Activity ==
Darren Indyke served as the vice president, and Erika Kellerhals served as the secretary, treasurer, and trustee. The foundation's board included Cecile de Jongh, wife of the former governor of the United States Virgin Islands, John de Jongh.

In 2003, the foundation pledged $30 million to Harvard University to establish the Program for Evolutionary Dynamics, directed by Martin Nowak, a professor of mathematics and biology. The university received only $6.5 million of this pledge. The foundation also supported NEURO.tv, a video series featuring experts discussing topics related to the brain, and the OpenCog project, an open-source software initiative for Artificial intelligence. The foundation held scientific conferences around topics including gravity, global threats to the Earth, and language.

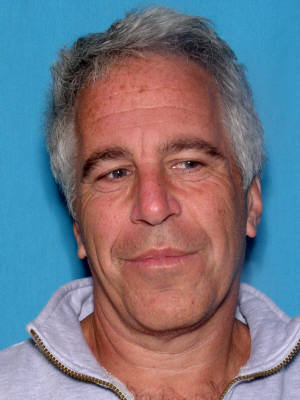
2009 mugshot of Epstein, the founder of the Jeffrey Epstein VI Foundation

From 2005 until 2007, the foundation funded the work of geneticist George Church for "cutting edge science & education". In 2008, the foundation lost its tax-exempt status and later investigation by The New York Times found that Epstein that had grossly overexaggerated how much the foundation had actually donated to causes.

As a representative of the foundation, Epstein sat on the Mind, Brain and Behavior Advisory Committee at Harvard University, and was involved in the Santa Fe Institute, the Theoretical Biology Initiative at the Institute for Advanced Study at Princeton, and the Quantum Gravity Program at the University of Pennsylvania. Epstein also served on the Trilateral Commission and the Council on Foreign Relations.

In January 2015, Eric Schneiderman contacted Darren Indyke, the foundation's vice president, to ask why the foundation had not registered with the New York Charities Bureau. The bureau required any charity based outside of New York to register and file annual reports. Indyke responded, claiming that the foundation did not operate within New York, and that any references to them running a New York office were added to the foundation's website by mistake. Later in 2015, the foundation registered with the New York Charities Bureau.

== Later investigation ==
Following Epstein's 2019 arrest, press began investigating his charities to validate claims of donations and to track who received them. The last tax filing on record for the foundation was in 2002, reporting assets valued at $13,432,769.

NBC News revealed that Epstein claimed to have donated to the Metropolitan Museum of Art through the foundation between 2010 and 2012, but the Museum claimed they had not received any major donations from Epstein or his foundation. The New York Times found that the foundation had falsely claimed to have underwritten the Tribeca Festival. Instead, the foundation had donated $28,000 to a related organization that offered grants and educational support to students.

In July 2014, the foundation claimed it had donated to the MIT Media Lab, to fund a program teaching toddlers how to code. They also claimed to fund the restoration of five Mark Rothko murals through the Massachusetts Institute of Technology. A spokesperson from the lab dismissed both claims as "completely incorrect."
