= Epstein scandal =

Epstein scandal may refer to several scandals regarding associations with Jeffrey Epstein:

== Norway ==
- Relationship of Mette-Marit, Crown Princess of Norway, and Jeffrey Epstein
- Relationship of Thorbjørn Jagland and Jeffrey Epstein

== United Kingdom ==
- Relationship of Peter Mandelson and Jeffrey Epstein
- Relationship of Prince Andrew and Jeffrey Epstein

== United States ==
- Epstein files
- Relationship of Bill Clinton and Jeffrey Epstein
- Relationship of Donald Trump and Jeffrey Epstein
- Relationship of Les Wexner and Jeffrey Epstein

== See also ==
- Connections of Jeffrey Epstein
- List of people named in the Epstein files
