= Mark Middleton =

Mark Middleton may refer to:

- Mark Middleton (businessman) (1961–2022), American businessman
- Mark Middleton (musician), American R&B musician
- Mark-Anthony Middleton, American politician
