= Relationship of Bill Clinton and Jeffrey Epstein =

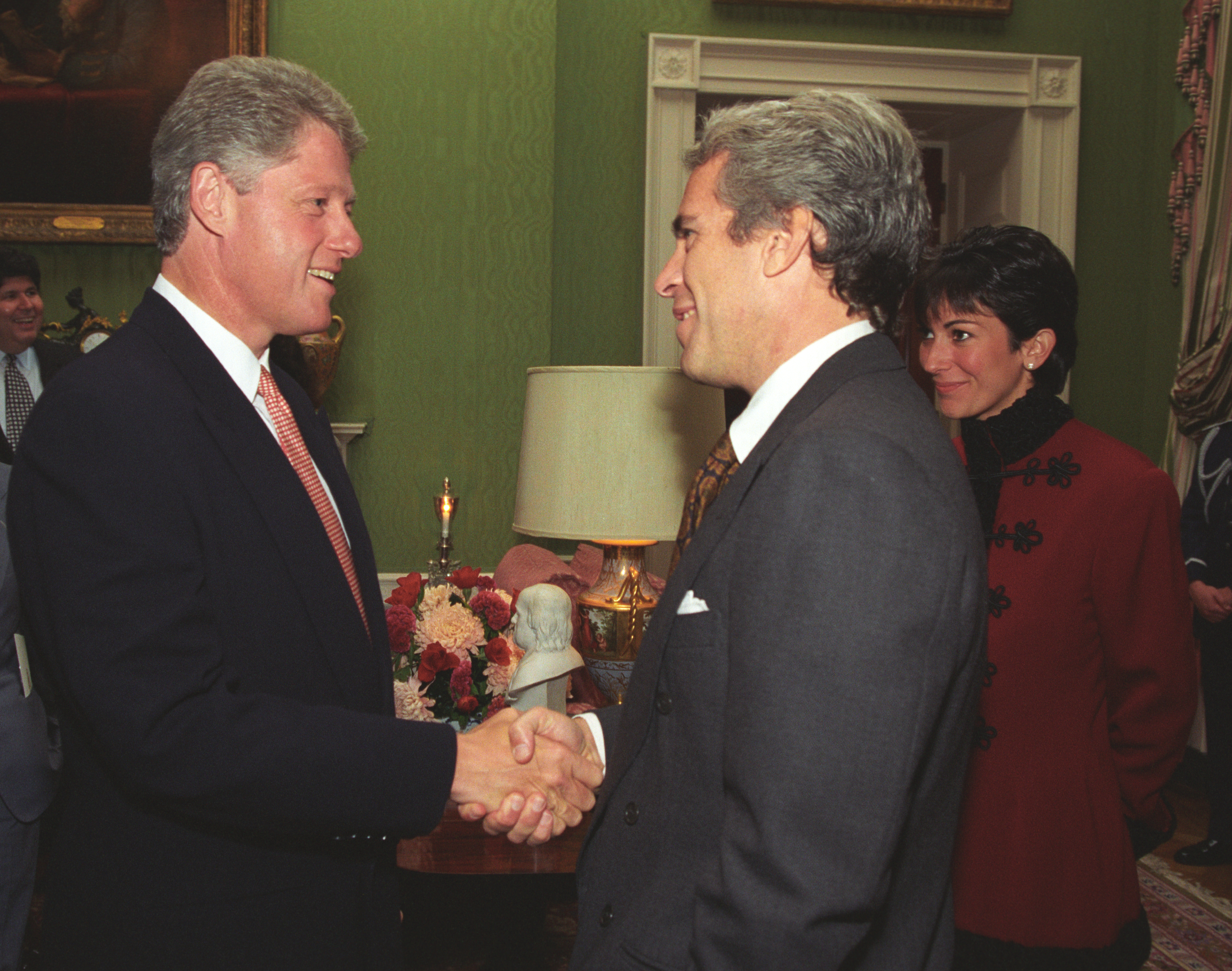
Bill Clinton meeting Jeffrey Epstein and Ghislaine Maxwell in the White House (1993)

Bill Clinton, the 42nd president of the United States, developed a social and professional relationship with financier and child sex offender Jeffrey Epstein that began in the early 1990s and continued into the early 2000s. During Clinton's presidency, Epstein made at least 17 visits to the White House and maintained ties with Clinton's associates. After leaving office, Clinton traveled on Epstein's private jet, on several occasions, for charitable trips, with his use of the plane for an African humanitarian trip in September 2002 also being credited as greatly strengthening Epstein's previously low-level amount of media publicity. Epstein's interactions with Clinton can be traced to the early 1990s and concluded in 2003.

Following Epstein's 2019 arrest for sex trafficking of minors in the early 2000s, and his death in prison, the relationship has come under further scrutiny, alongside Epstein's former friendship with the 45th and 47th U.S. president Donald Trump. Clinton has denied any knowledge of Epstein's criminal activities, and had distanced himself from the disgraced financier, in the years before Epstein's 2019 arrest and death. In 2025, Epstein's now-convicted accomplice and former girlfriend Ghislaine Maxwell claimed Clinton was a friend of hers, not Epstein's, and denied that Clinton was involved in any of Epstein's crimes.

Epstein victims, including Virginia Giuffre, did not accuse Clinton of sexual misconduct or abuse in relation to his former ties to Epstein. However, the Epstein-related court files that were unsealed in January 2024 included several references to Clinton. In November 2025, the relationship between Clinton and Epstein would be subjected to a federal investigation. The same month, emails from 2011 and 2015 were made public, which revealed Epstein personally denying Clinton visited his private island. In January 2026, it was also revealed that the Federal Bureau of Investigation (FBI) had, in fact, previously investigated allegations against Clinton, which were connected to Epstein.

== Early ties (1990s) ==
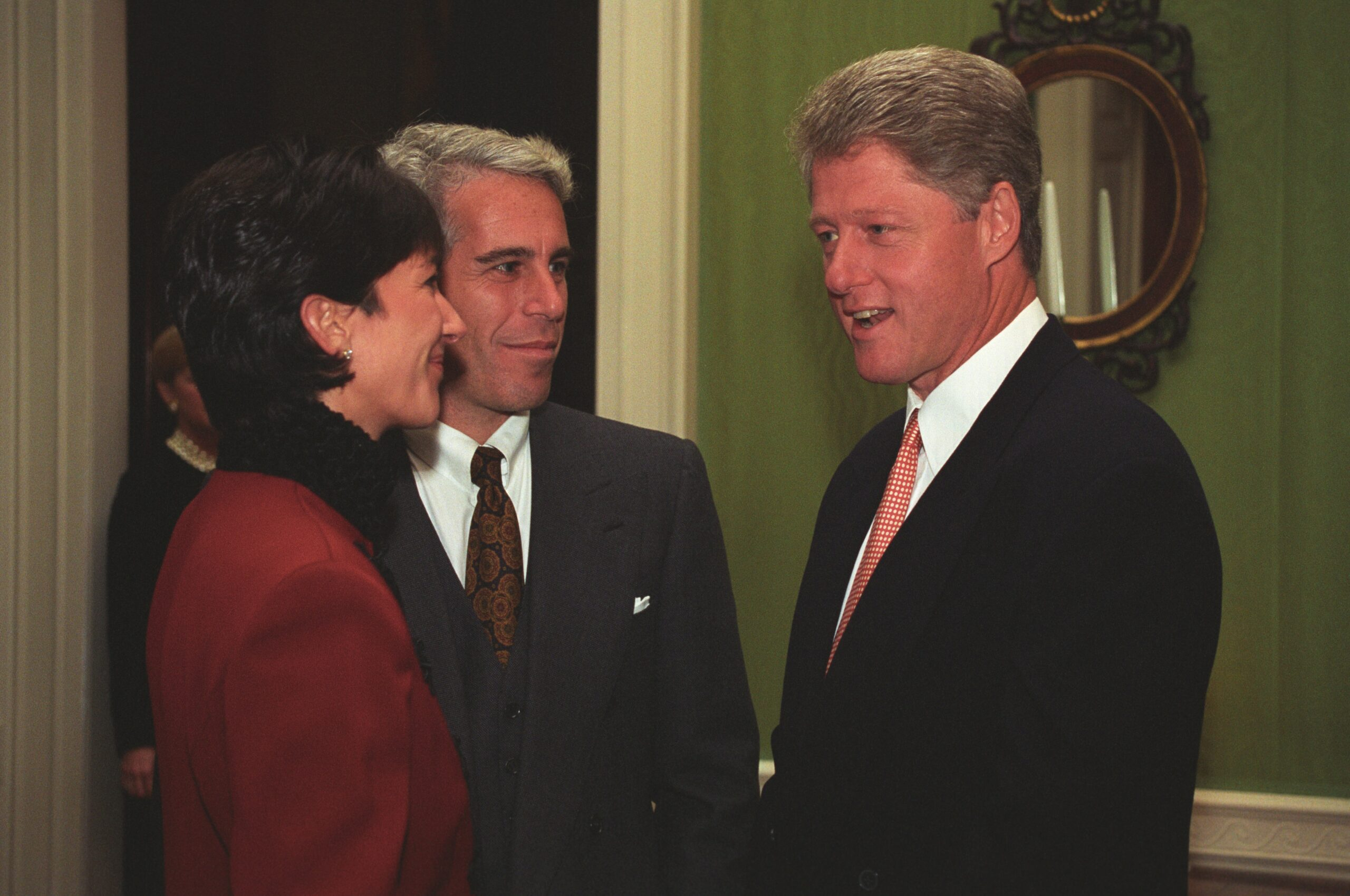
President Clinton hosting Epstein and Maxwell at the White House in 1993

Epstein's interactions with Clinton can be traced to the early 1990s. After donating $1,000 to Bill Clinton's presidential election campaign, in 1991, Epstein donated $10,000 to the White House Historical Association, in 1993, and accompanied by Maxwell, he attended a donors' reception hosted by President Clinton and First Lady Hillary Clinton. Around the same period, visitor logs indicate Epstein paid several visits to the White House to meet with Mark Middleton, a Clinton aide and assistant to the White House chief of staff, in 1993–1995. Middleton, a friend of Clinton's from Arkansas, was, later, identified as having facilitated Epstein's White House access, in at least three instances.

While Clinton was president, Epstein visited the White House, at least 17 times, between 1993 and 1995. By 1995, Epstein was circulating in Clinton's social orbit: that year, he and Maxwell attended a small fundraising dinner at the Palm Beach home of billionaire Ron Perelman, which Clinton also attended. In April 1995, businesswoman Lynn Forester (later Lynn Forester de Rothschild), a Clinton supporter, wrote a personal letter to the president mentioning that she had used her "fifteen seconds of access" to discuss "Jeffrey Epstein and currency stabilization" with him, suggesting Clinton was acquainted with Epstein's financial acumen. Clinton's later schedules and archives confirm that Epstein and Maxwell were received, as part of at least one White House donor event in 1993, though the exact nature of their conversations with Clinton remains unclear.

== Post-presidency relationship (2001–2003) ==
Clinton left office in January 2001 and soon embarked on humanitarian and philanthropic initiatives, through the Clinton Foundation. During this post-presidential period, his association with Epstein continued, in the context of charity travel and social meetings. Epstein was an active supporter of the Clinton Foundation, even lending his Boeing 727 private jet for Clinton's international trips.

In 2002 and 2003, Clinton took multiple flights on Epstein's plane, commonly known by the nickname "Lolita Express,”as part of foundation-related tours to promote global health and economic development. Flight log records later indicated Clinton's name, on at least 17 legs of Epstein's flights, in that timeframe. On one high-profile trip in 2002, Clinton flew aboard Epstein's jet to Africa, along with actors Kevin Spacey and Chris Tucker, to visit HIV/AIDS project sites. Clinton's spokesman would, later, state that these comprised four distinct trips on Epstein's aircraft – one to Europe, one to Asia, and two to Africa – and that Clinton was accompanied by staff, foundation supporters, and Secret Service agents on all legs of those journeys.

However, Clinton using Epstein's plane for the September 2002 African trip, and Clinton, Kevin Spacey and Chris Tucker all being passengers on Epstein's plane during the trip, had also been previously discussed prior to the revelations of Epstein's controversies. An article in the October 28, 2002 issue of New York Magazine noted that Doug Band was the one pitched the idea to Epstein that Clinton use his plane for the trip, which in turn strengthened Epstein's relationship with Clinton and also got Epstein, who was at the time less known in the media and hardly ever mentioned in gossip columns, greater publicity.

Around the same time period, Clinton also visited Epstein's New York apartment and office in 2002, each time with his aide and security detail present. Clinton and Epstein appeared to be on friendly terms; a photo from 2002 shows them together, during a stop in Brunei, and in an interview that year, Clinton praised Epstein as a "highly successful financier" and "a committed philanthropist". Epstein's New York residence, according to one visitor, contained a signed photograph of Clinton. Epstein possessed an oil painting of Clinton in a blue dress and heels, Parsing Bill, made by a student at the New York Academy of Art in 2012. According to one of his lawyers, Epstein was "part of the original group" that conceived the Clinton Global Initiative, a flagship program of Clinton's philanthropic work.

This relationship extended to Maxwell, as well. She and Epstein were invited guests at events, early in the Clinton Foundation era, and Maxwell was noted as the likely social "glue" connecting Epstein to Clinton's world. However, in 2003, Clinton would skip a dinner party, which Epstein invited him to.

== Diminished contact (post 2003) ==
Clinton's direct contact with Epstein appears to have tapered off, by the mid-2000s. Epstein was arrested and convicted in Florida in 2008 on charges of procuring a minor for prostitution. There is no public evidence that Clinton and Epstein interacted, after about 2005 and 2006. In 2019, Clinton's office stated he had "not spoken to Epstein in well over a decade".

Epstein's close associate, Ghislaine Maxwell, continued to socialize within Clinton's family circle, for some years. Maxwell attended Chelsea Clinton's wedding in 2010, traveled on a private yacht with Chelsea in 2009, and even participated in Clinton Global Initiative conferences, as late as 2013. A Clinton spokesperson, later, said that Chelsea and Maxwell were not close friends, despite Maxwell's appearances at these events. In 2015, Chelsea became aware of the "horrific" allegations against Maxwell and hoped that Epstein's victims would find justice.

In a 2025 prison interview, when Todd Blanche asked "well, why did you get invited to that wedding?", Maxwell responded: "Because Ted [Waitt] and Clinton were very close." Billionaire Ted Waitt and Maxwell had been romantically linked in the 2000s. Waitt had been a “very close family friend” of Chelsea and her husband, Marc Mezvinsky, and introduced the couple to Maxwell, according to reporting by Politico. Maxwell also claimed that Epstein was not at the wedding. Hillary Clinton claims that Maxwell was a plus-one.

== Allegations of island visit ==
In a 2011 Daily Mail interview, Virginia Giuffre made allegations relating to Jeffrey Epstein. She also told the Mail that Bill Clinton and Al Gore had visited Epstein's island, and recalled dining with Clinton on the island, but did not accuse him of sexual wrongdoing. Giuffre said that Ghislaine Maxwell "went to pick up Bill in a huge black helicopter that Jeffrey had bought her", and said she “used to get frightened flying with her but Bill had the Secret Service with him and I remember him talking about what a good job she did". In a since-declassified 2011 email, Epstein wrote: "[T]hese stories are complete an[d] utter fantasy, I don’t know and have never met Al gore, Clinton was never on the island".

In the mid 2010s, Giuffre's claims relating to Clinton resurfaced in lawsuits. In a deposition, Ghislaine Maxwell called Giuffre's account "an obvious lie". Alan Dershowitz said that Giuffre's story was improbable, as the secret service would not allow Maxwell, "then a novice helicopter pilot", to fly a former president. Giuffre clarified that she had only heard Clinton arrived via helicopter from Maxwell and hadn't witnessed it herself. Giuffre's attorneys argued that Clinton was a "key" witness, due to his "close personal relationship" with Epstein and Maxwell, and in 2016, they formally requested to depose Clinton in the Giuffre v. Maxwell case. This request was denied by a federal judge.

A 2017 Freedom of Information Act request of secret service records found no evidence that Clinton had visited Little St. James. Epstein's flight logs also did not substantiate Clinton visiting the island. In 2019, a spokesperson for Clinton denied he ever visited the island. In a 2020 Vanity Fair article, former Clinton advisor Doug Band, said that Clinton had visited the island in January 2003. A Clinton spokesperson said that Clinton had never been to the island, and provided travel logs that did not include any mention of such a visit.

== Renewed scrutiny ==
On July 6, 2019, Epstein was arrested on federal charges of sex trafficking minors, prompting intense media focus on all his past connections. Clinton's office released a public statement soon after, detailing the extent of Clinton's interactions with Epstein in an effort to dispel rumors. The statement confirmed the 2002–03 plane trips (four trips totalling a number of flights, as previously described) and acknowledged a meeting in Epstein's New York apartment in 2002, but it asserted that Clinton "knows nothing about the terrible crimes" Epstein committed and had never visited Epstein's island, New Mexico ranch, or Palm Beach residence. It also stated that Clinton had not spoken to Epstein since approximately 2002–2003.

In late 2019, a federal appeals court unsealed thousands of pages of documents from prior Epstein lawsuits, including private flight logs. These logs corroborated that Epstein's pilots recorded Clinton as a passenger on numerous flights between 2001 and 2003, often related to Clinton Foundation work or paid speaking tours. In the years following Epstein's 2019 death, scrutiny of Clinton's ties has continued, including in official inquiries. In 2023–2024, Republicans in Congress signaled interest in investigating Epstein's connections to U.S. officials. Finally, in 2025, the House Oversight Committee (led by Representative James Comer) issued subpoenas for testimony from Bill Clinton and Hillary Clinton regarding Epstein. Comer's letter alleged that the Clinton family "had a close relationship" with Epstein and Maxwell, highlighting Clinton's admitted plane trips on Epstein's jet and claiming that Clinton was photographed receiving a massage from one of Epstein's victims during one trip; the victim herself stated that the impromptu massage was innocent and that Clinton was a "perfect gentleman" during the trip.

According to a Wall Street Journal report published in July 2025, Clinton contributed a handwritten note to a birthday book that Maxwell compiled for Epstein's 50th birthday in 2003. The message, written in what the WSJ described as Clinton's "distinctive scrawl", reads: "It's reassuring isn't it, to have lasted as long, across all the years of learning and knowing, adventures and [illegible word], and also to have your childlike curiosity, the drive to make a difference and the solace of friends." In August 2025, Maxwell stated to the U.S. Department of Justice that Epstein was only connected to Clinton through her, denied a friendship between them and stated that Clinton had never been to Little Saint James. Maxwell said that she was "sure" that Bill Clinton "absolutely never went" to the island, given that, "I don't believe he had an independent friendship, if you will, with Epstein."

Full February 2026 deposition

On November 12, 2025, a list of names documented in Epstein's flight logs and personal contact book records was published by The Independent which showed Clinton was listed in Epstein's flight logs. However, Clinton was not among the names listed as being in Epstein's personal contact book. Emails from 2011, including one which involved a private discussion over a stolen telephone book, and 2015 were also released in November 2025 which revealed that Epstein personally denied that Bill Clinton ever visited his island, with Epstein telling someone he identified as "the Duke" 2011 email that “[T]hese stories are complete ant utter fantasy,, I don’t know and have never met Al gore, CLinton was never on the island.. the telephone book is not mine, it was stolen by my houseman that is currently in prison for doing so.” In December 2025, after photos of Clinton from the Epstein Files were made public, The Guardian stated that Clinton was still not accused of wrongdoing by any survivors of Epstein's sex abuse. A representative for Clinton maintained to People that Clinton did not have knowledge of Epstein's crimes, and also alleged that the release of "20-plus year old photos" was a way for the administration of U.S. president Donald Trump, who notably once had a close relationship with Epstein, to try to shield "themselves from what comes next, or from what they'll try and hide forever," further stating that "Even Susie Wiles said Donald Trump was wrong about Bill Clinton." Portions of the Epstein files which were released on January 30, 2026, revealed that the FBI had in fact secretly investigated Epstein-related allegations against Clinton, with some being unverified and described as "not credible." It was also revealed that Epstein was in fact called to testify about his relationship with Clinton during a deposition which took place in September 2016 as part of Virginia Giuffre's lawsuit, to which he invoked the Fifth Amendment.

While testifying before the U.S. House Oversight Committee on February 27, 2026, Clinton stated that he "saw nothing" and "did nothing wrong" when addressing Epstein. However, a claim by committee chairman Rep. James Comer that Clinton's remarks also implied that he had never seen anything to make him think Trump was involved with Epstein was also refuted.

== History ==
Clinton's relationship with Epstein has been the subject of extensive commentary, political controversy, and conspiracy theories, particularly after Epstein's crimes came to light. Political opponents of the Clintons have frequently highlighted the association. During Hillary Clinton's 2016 presidential campaign, for example, Republican National Committee chairman Reince Priebus in 2015 pointed to Bill Clinton's interactions with Epstein "multiple times, on private jets, on weekends, on trips to places where it's been reported not very good things happen". He argued that the Clintons owed the public a full explanation of their dealings.

In 2019, President Donald Trump fueled speculation about Clinton's ties to Epstein. Following Epstein's apparent suicide in jail, Trump retweeted a conspiracy theory suggesting the Clintons were behind Epstein's death and told reporters it was a "respected" pundit's opinion. Trump went further to accuse Clinton of lying about his trips on Epstein's plane, claiming flight records showed Clinton had been onboard "27 or 28 times" when Clinton said it was only four—"Why did he say four times?" Trump remarked, insinuating that Clinton was concealing the true extent of the friendship (in fact, the number "27" appears to count individual flight segments, while Clinton's statement counted four extended trips comprising those segments). Clinton's spokesman Angel Ureña responded by calling Trump's insinuations "ridiculous" and noted that even in those unsealed files there was no allegation of wrongdoing by Clinton.

The mystery surrounding Epstein's death and the broader "Epstein scandal" in 2019 also gave rise to a surge of conspiracy theories on social media, many of which implicated the Clintons without evidence. The phrase "Clinton Body Count" – a long-running conspiracy trope alleging the Clintons orchestrate the deaths of their enemies – trended anew with insinuations that Bill or Hillary Clinton had Epstein killed. Hours after Epstein's death, Trump retweeted claims that Epstein's death was related to Clinton, including the hashtag #ClintonBodyCount. After Epstein accomplice Jean-Luc Brunel died by suicide in a French prison before going on trial, on February 19, 2022. Senator Ted Cruz attempted to link Brunel's death to the Clintons by asking "Anyone know where Hillary was this weekend?" On May 7, 2022, Mark Middleton (who linked Epstein to Clinton) was found dead at the Heifer Ranch in Perryville, Arkansas, approximately 30 miles from his home, with a shotgun found near his dead body. His death was ruled a suicide. His family was harassed by conspiracy theorists after his death.

Epstein's former employee Johanna Sjoberg testified that Epstein had once quipped "Clinton likes them young" in reference to girls. Another allegation surfaced in a 2011 email from Virginia Giuffre (made public years later), in which Giuffre told a journalist that "B. Clinton" had "walked into" Vanity Fair and "threatened them not to write sex-trafficking articles about his good friend" Jeffrey Epstein.

=== Federal investigations ===
Over the years, the FBI investigated various Epstein-related allegations against Bill Clinton, some of which it determined were not credible. This information was revealed in the Epstein Files release on January 30, 2026. At that time, it was also revealed that during a September 2016 deposition Epstein had been asked to testify about his relationship with Clinton, to which he replied: "Fifth." On November 14, 2025, President Trump directed the U.S. Department of Justice to investigate Epstein's relationship with, among others, Clinton. However, some, including U.S. House of Representatives member Thomas Massie (a Republican from Kentucky), noted that this and the other new and old (including the one against Trump) Department of Justice investigations against Epstein may have been intended to distract the U.S. Department of Justice and prevent release of the Epstein files at an earlier date. On February 2, 2026, House Oversight Committee chair James Comer (R-Kentucky) declined the latest offer from the Clintons to testify. Later in the day, it was agreed that Bill and Hillary Clinton would testify before the House Oversight Committee, thus putting an end to the threat of a contempt of congress vote.

=== Congressional testimonies from Hillary and Bill Clinton ===
Bill and Hillary Clinton testify before the House Committee on Oversight and Government Reform on their ties with Epstein; February 27, 2026.

Hillary Clinton would begin testifying before the U.S. House Oversight Committee on February 26, 2026. However, her testimony would be put on hold after Rep. Lauren Boebert was found to have violated protocol by leaking a photo of Hillary's testimony to conservative podcaster Benny Johnson. Numerous Democrats on the committee, including the committee's ranking Democrat Robert Garcia, stated that Hillary was cooperating with the deposition requirement and accused Republicans of trying to create theatrics and finding ways to delay getting information about Epstein. Testimony would resume, though Comer would still refuse to allow the press to enter the House chamber. On February 27, 2026, Bill Clinton would testify before the committee. Garcia described Bill Clinton as "very cooperative," with Comer also describing Clinton as "charming."

== See also ==
- Public image of Bill Clinton
- Bill Clinton sexual assault and misconduct allegations
- List of people named in the Epstein files
- Relationship of Donald Trump and Jeffrey Epstein
- Relationship of Les Wexner and Jeffrey Epstein
- Relationship of Ehud Barak and Jeffrey Epstein
- Relationship of Prince Andrew and Jeffrey Epstein
- Relationship of Peter Mandelson and Jeffrey Epstein
- Relationship of Mette-Marit, Crown Princess of Norway, and Jeffrey Epstein
