= Daniel West =

Daniel or Dan West may refer to:

- Daniel Granville West, Baron Granville-West (1904–1984), British Labour politician
- Dan West (philanthropist) (1893–1971), founder of Heifer International
- Dan West (athlete) (born 1977), British Paralympic athlete
- Dan West (Canadian football) (born 1986)
- Dan West (musician), American rock and jazz musician
- Daniel West (character), enemy of the Flash in DC Comics
