= Pedophile Protection Party =

Pejorative political phrase in the United States

The phrases Pedophile Protection Party, pedophile protector, and Grand Old Pedophiles (GOP) (Note: The Republican Party is also known as the Grand Old Party (GOP).) are pejoratives used to suggest that Republican Party officials have defended prominent pedophiles, particularly Jeffrey Epstein, on behalf of Donald Trump.

== Background ==
During the 2024 United States presidential election, Republican Donald Trump and his political allies repeatedly called for the release of the Epstein files. Early in the second Trump administration in 2025, Attorney General Pam Bondi and FBI Director Kash Patel suggested they would quickly release the files. In May, the DOJ told Trump that his name was in the files. In July, Trump said an "Epstein Hoax" had been fabricated by members of the Democratic Party. In July, the DOJ and FBI both announced that Epstein died by suicide. From July to November, House Republicans delayed the Epstein Files Transparency Act. Its passage compelled the FBI and DOJ to release information. The FBI and DOJ released six waves of files between December 2025 and March 2026. Some files remain unreleased.

Trump's reversal from transparency to slow-walking, and additional details revealed about the relationship of Donald Trump and Jeffrey Epstein, led many prominent Democrats to accuse Republicans of attempting to hide the files in order to protect Donald Trump and other prominent Epstein associates. As a result, the Epstein files became a central argument in the 2026 midterm elections.

== Timeline ==
In July 2025, Republican House Speaker Mike Johnson ended the House's legislative business until September in order to avoid a vote on the Epstein Files Transparency Act. Ilhan Omar (D-MN‑5) said "the pedophile protection party is shutting down Congress just to avoid voting on the release of the Epstein files"; Senate Minority Leader Chuck Schumer called it the "Epstein Recess"; and the Democratic National Committee labelled the GOP the "Pedophile Protection Party".

In July 2025, JD Vance visited a Metallus factory in Canton, Ohio, where protesters carried signs reading "JD Protects Pedophiles" and "GOP (Guardians Of Pedophiles)".

In November 2025, a Los Angeles billboard ad read "GOP: Guardians Of Pedophiles" over pictures of Kash Patel, Mike Johnson, Donald Trump, Pam Bondi, and JD Vance, stylized after Guardians of the Galaxy. The billboard was timed to coincide with House Oversight Committee Democrats releasing additional Epstein files, including a 2011 email where Epstein said Trump was "the dog that hasn't barked" and had "spent hours at my house" with a victim.

In January 2026, Donald Trump visited the Ford River Rouge complex in Dearborn, Michigan, where an auto worker called Trump a "pedophile protector". TMZ filmed Trump giving the worker the middle finger, mouthing "fuck you", and mouthing "you're fired". White House communications director Steven Cheung said Trump's response was "appropriate" and called the worker "a lunatic". DNC chair Ken Martin said Trump was "protecting pedophiles and saying fuck you to American workers". The worker told The Washington Post that he was an political independent, wanted Trump to release the full Epstein files, and had "no regrets". UAW said it supports freedom of speech and "protecting [our membership's] voice on the job". The worker was briefly suspended, but returned to work with no discipline.

In February 2026, Donald Trump criticized immigrants from Somalia and called Ilhan Omar a "fake congresswoman". In reply, Omar said "The leader of the Pedophile Protection Party is trying to deflect attention from his name being all over the Epstein files. At least in Somalia they execute pedophiles not elect them." In response, House Oversight Committee Chair James Comer (R-KY‑1) said Omar should "keep her mouth shut" and "go back to Somalia".

In April 2026, Trump fired Pam Bondi, reportedly due to dissatisfaction with her failed prosecutions of Trump's political opponents and handling of the Epstein files. Congressional Democrats cheered the firing and said Bondi had "covered up" the Epstein files for Trump. The Democratic National Committee said history would remember Bondi for "blindly following the President's orders" and "protecting pedophiles".

In July 2026, Donald Trump visited a General Motors factory, where a protester called him a "pedophile protector". In response, Trump called the protester "a communist". The Daily Show said: "Show some respect for the office! That's PRESIDENT Pedophile Protector."

In September 2026, protests against the 2026 Republican National Convention focused heavily on Epstein. In Google Search results, the real RNC website appeared well below a hoax website, gopdallas2026.com, which redirected visitors to the Epstein files. The Women's March postered around the convention with "GOP: Gang of Pedophiles" over a picture of Donald Trump and Jeffrey Epstein partying. A billboard truck drove around with an "Paxton protects pedos" advert. A Jeffrey Epstein "Walk of Shame", styled after the Hollywood Walk of Fame, showed the names and alleged Epstein links for major Republicans, including Donald Trump, Elon Musk, Steve Bannon, Les Wexner, and Peter Thiel.

In October 2026, JD Vance was repeatedly heckled as a "pedophile protector". On October 2, at a rally in Lakeland, Florida, Democratic Florida House district 65 candidate Ben Braver heckled Vance with "thank you so much for the gas prices" and "pedophile protector". Braver and police walked outside, where police dropped him to the ground and jailed him for "resisting arrest". Braver said he did not resist arrest and had "no regrets" about the protest. On October 19, at a rally in Hendersonville, North Carolina, a protester shouted: "Release the Epstein files. God bless our children." Vance suggested the protester, who is Hispanic, was an illegal immigrant. In reality, he was born and raised in Hendersonville. On October 20, at a rally in Sharonville, Ohio near Cincinnati, a protester threw down his red MAGA hat and shouted "Pedophile protector. You're just a pedophile protector". At each event, the crowd chanted "U-S-A!" to drown out the heckler.

In October 2026, after federal immigration agents raided Ilhan Omar's home, Omar called Trump the "leader of the Pedophile Protection Party" seeking to deflect from the 2026 Iran War.

== Related terms ==
In 2017, Republican Senate candidate Roy Moore was accused of sexually abusing teenage girls. Discussing the continued Republican support for Moore, John Heilemann warned that the GOP could become the "party of pedophiles", while Ana Navarro and Chris Matthews used "Grand Old Pedophiles" as a pejorative. In response, a Fox News panel said Trump had built a strong economy and military.

== See also ==
- Relationship of Donald Trump and Jeffrey Epstein
- Protests against the second Trump administration
