= Relationship of Donald Trump and Jeffrey Epstein =

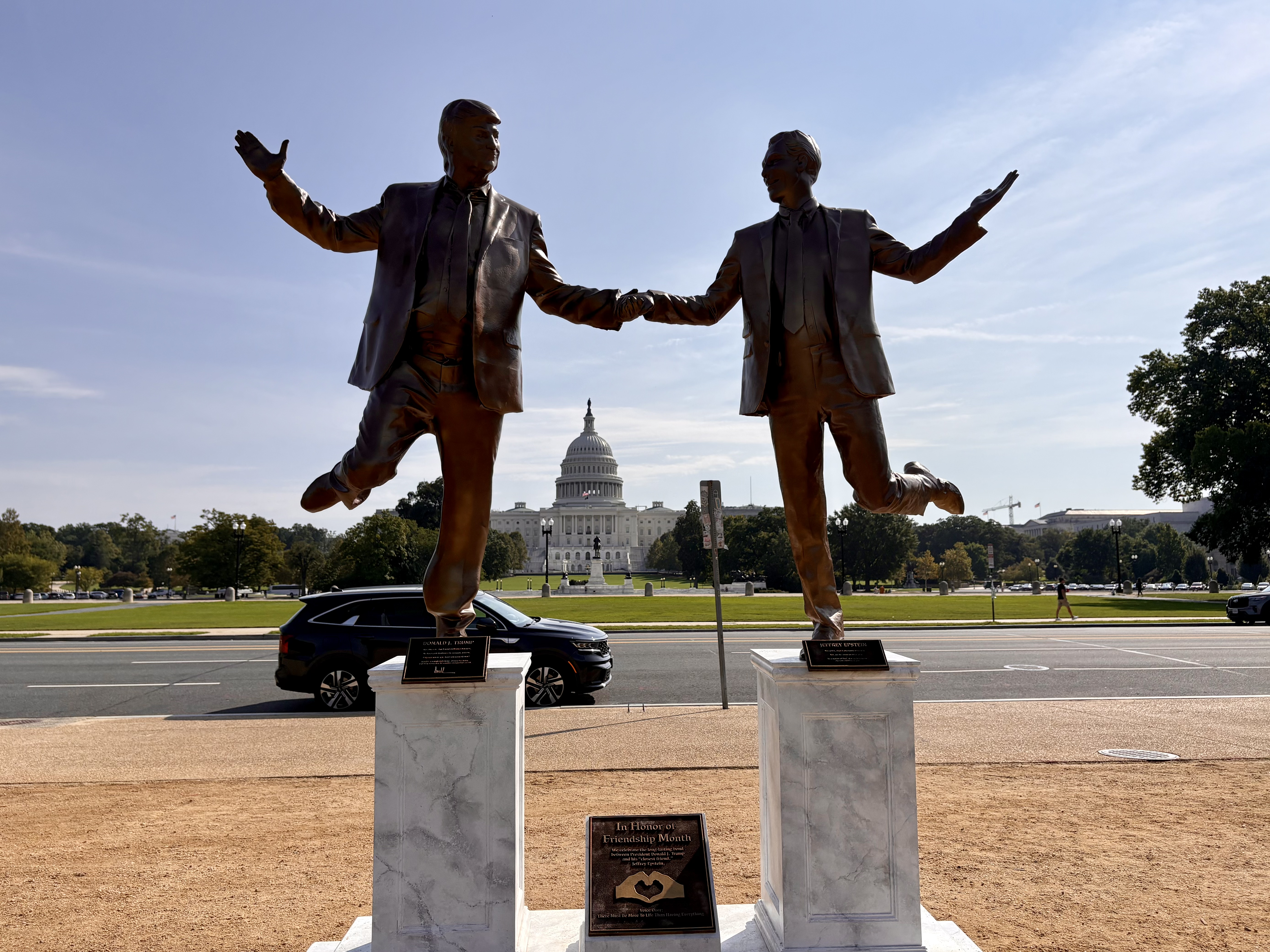
Best Friends Forever, a 2025 statue created by activists to protest Donald Trump and Jeffrey Epstein's relationship

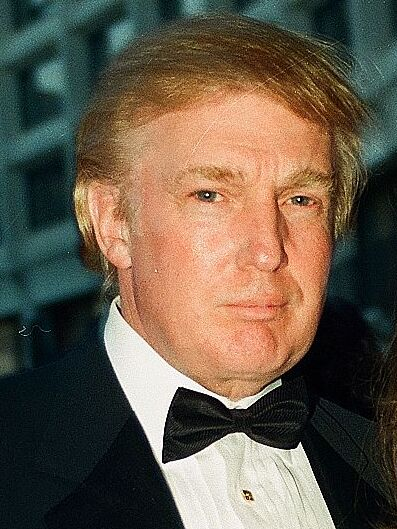
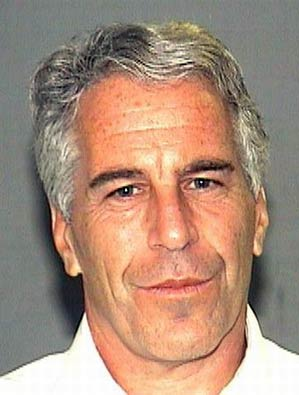
Trump (left) and Epstein (right)

Donald Trump, the 45th and 47th president of the United States, developed a social and professional relationship with financier and child sex offender Jeffrey Epstein that began in the late 1980s and continued into at least the early 2000s. During Trump's prior careers as a businessman and media personality before entering politics in 2015, he and Epstein visited each other's real estate properties regularly. Trump and Epstein socialized frequently throughout the 1990s and early 2000s, including attending parties at Trump's Mar-a-Lago resort in Florida and Epstein's residence. Flight logs released during an associate's trial confirm that Trump flew on Epstein's private jet multiple times in the 1990s, and according to Epstein, Trump first had sex with his future wife Melania Knauss in his private jet. Five women have accused Trump of raping or sexually assaulting them in Epstein’s company, and another six also connected Trump to Epstein's sex trafficking operation. Trump had a falling out with Epstein around 2004 and ceased contact. After Epstein was said to have sexually harassed a teenage daughter of another Mar-a-Lago member in 2007, Trump alleged he banned him from the club. Epstein said, in a 2019 email attributed by NBC News and Axios to the event, that he had never been a member of the club.

Epstein was convicted of procuring a person under the age of 18 for prostitution in 2008. Since Epstein's 2019 arrest for sex trafficking of minors and his death in prison shortly thereafter, their former relationship has come under further scrutiny, particularly during and after Trump's re-election as president in 2024. Trump has denied any knowledge of Epstein's criminal activities and distanced himself from the deceased financier in the years before Epstein's arrest and death. Trump promoted unsubstantiated conspiracy theories about the circumstances and suggested Epstein was murdered. Media attention and public pressure mounted in 2025, as the Trump administration had not released files relating to Epstein, despite Trump promising to do so during his 2024 presidential campaign.

On November 12, 2025, Democrats on the House Oversight Committee released thousands of emails authored by Epstein and his associates. Epstein had claimed in a number of private email exchanges that he had damaging information on Trump. In a 2011 email to his accomplice Ghislaine Maxwell, Epstein said that Trump had spent hours at his house with Virginia Giuffre and that Trump was "the dog that didn't bark". Although Giuffre revealed that Epstein and Maxwell had recruited her from Mar-a-Lago into a sex trafficking ring, she did not accuse Trump himself of wrongdoing. Maxwell claimed in 2025 that Trump was not a "close friend" of Epstein, contradicting Epstein's previous statements, and that she never witnessed Trump behave inappropriately. No criminal wrongdoing has ever been established against Trump in connection with Epstein's crimes. A sexually suggestive birthday note, allegedly written by Trump to Epstein in 2003, included a crude drawing; Trump has denied its legitimacy.

The two chambers of the U.S. Congress passed the Epstein Files Transparency Act on November 18, 2025, forcing the Department of Justice to release eligible documents related to Epstein and his associates. Trump had opposed the bill for months, but expressed support for it on the day before Congress approved it, and then he signed it. The White House stated that the release of these emails was only to create "fake news" against Trump and was actually a reaction from Democrats to the government shutdown. Democratic Representative Ro Khanna from California stated that the purpose of releasing the files was not to attack Trump. In June 2025, Trump associate Elon Musk also claimed that the reason for not releasing the Epstein files was because Trump's name was in the documents, a claim that the Department of Justice denied. On January 31, 2026, Trump said he would sue writer Michael Wolff and "maybe the Epstein estate, I guess" for allegedly conspiring against Trump's political aspirations, again claiming that Epstein was "not a friend", after The New York Times had asserted a month earlier that they were once best friends.

== History ==
Since the 1970s, at least 28 women have accused Donald Trump of sexual misconduct, for acts that have included rape, kissing and groping without consent; looking under women's skirts; and walking in on naked teenage pageant contestants. Trump has denied all of the allegations. He has a history of insulting and belittling women when speaking to the media and on social media, and has made lewd comments about women, disparaged their physical appearance, and referred to them using derogatory epithets.

Jeffrey Epstein cultivated an elite social circle and procured many women and children whom he and his associates sexually abused. In addition to his own sexual abuse of the victims, Epstein directed other persons to abuse the girls sexually. Epstein used paid employees to find and bring minor girls to him. Epstein worked in concert with others to obtain minors not only for his own sexual gratification, but also for the sexual gratification of others. His close associate Ghislaine Maxwell was later implicated as procuring or recruiting underage girls in addition to being, for an extended period, Epstein's chief girlfriend.

=== Early years (1980s–1992) ===
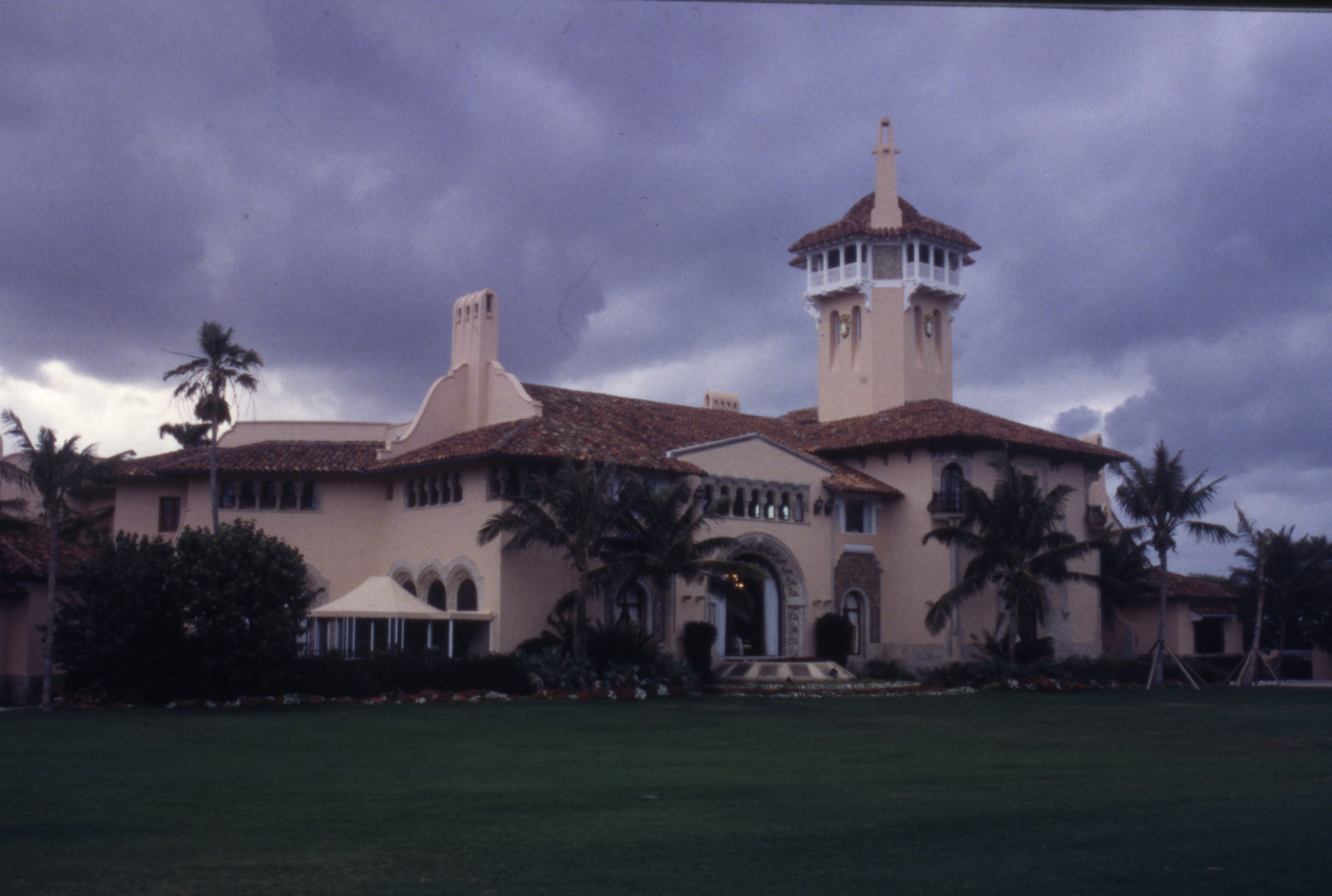
Exterior of Mar-a-Lago in 1999

Trump said that his friendship with Epstein started in the late 1980s. The two men were neighbors and would visit each other's properties. On the July 16, 2025, episode of Erin Burnett Outfront, Jack O'Donnell, who served as COO of Trump Plaza and Casino from 1987 to 1990, claimed in an interview with CNN reporter Erin Burnett that, among other things, "In my mind, [Epstein] was his best friend, you know, [throughout] the time I was there for four years." They would often visit the casino floor together, with O'Donnell also recounting one occasion where he reprimanded both Trump and Epstein when they brought in some girls who were under the New Jersey legal gambling age of 21. O'Donnell previously wrote about this incident in his 1991 book Trumped!, though Epstein's name would be omitted by the book's publisher.

In 1990, Epstein bought a mansion two miles north of Mar-a-Lago, which Trump had purchased five years earlier. In 1992, Trump invited NBC to film a party he threw for himself and Epstein at Mar-a-Lago, where they joined various NFL cheerleaders. In the NBC video, Trump was filmed at a Mar-a-Lago party whispering in Epstein's ear, prompting Epstein to start laughing. NBC News revealed footage of the party in July 2019, showing Trump, Epstein and the cheerleaders. At one point during the video, Trump appears to tell Epstein: "Look at her, back there ... She's hot."

Florida businessman George Houraney and Jill Harth, a long-term couple, ran a pin-up girl beauty competition called American Dream Calendar Girls. In December 1992, they sought out Trump as an investor and met with him in Manhattan. Trump openly expressed his sexual interest in Harth, allegedly groping her and telling Houraney "I'm going to go after her". (At this time, Houraney and Harth had been a couple for over a decade.) Harth also recalled Trump saying: "I'd like to see the quality of the girls" in the competition. The following month, they reached a deal, and Trump invited them to Mar-a-Lago with a number of the models, where he allegedly groped Harth again. Houraney said he brought 28 people he described as "girls" to the property at Trump's request in order to host a private "calendar girl" event exclusively for Trump and Epstein. The American Dream competition was held at Trump Castle in Atlantic City in November 1993. Trump refused to sign a contract beforehand; afterward, the venue claimed it had lost money and that it would no longer host the event. Houraney sued Trump in 1995 over the business deal, claiming he had been cheated out of a $250,000 fee as well as potential millions of dollars in future business. In 1997, Harth (who was by then married to Houraney) sued Trump for sexual misconduct. Later in 1997, Houraney settled with Trump; as part of their settlement, Harth dropped her lawsuit. Houraney and Harth then divorced, and Trump invited Houraney to his Mar-a-Lago Christmas party that year.

=== Trump-Maples wedding, Stacey Williams allegations (1993) ===
Model Stacey Williams said that, upon arriving at the Trump Tower in 1993, Trump and Epstein touched her while trading smiles. She told The Guardian in 2024 that "It became very clear then that he and Donald were really, really good friends and spent a lot of time together." She described the incident as a "twisted game" between Trump and Epstein. Epstein attended Trump's wedding to Marla Maples in the Plaza Hotel. Later that year, Epstein went to a Harley-Davidson Cafe with Trump and his children. There are photographs of both interactions. In 2015, Epstein wrote to a reporter, "When we bet that Marla Maples was pregnant [Maples gave birth to Tiffany Trump in October 1993], I lost and sent him 10,000 dollars of baby food." Epstein was photographed alongside Trump and Trump's 12-year-old daughter Ivanka at Manhattan's Harley Davidson cafe on October 19, 1993.

=== Plane flights, "Tiffany Doe", and Maria Farmer allegations (1994–2000) ===
In January 2020, an assistant U.S. Attorney for the Southern District of New York wrote that "Donald Trump traveled on Epstein's private jet ... on at least eight flights between 1993 and 1996." Flight logs released in 2021 showed seven flights that Trump took on the plane between 1993 and 1997. (Note: The flight logs contain eight entries listing "Donald Trump" with dates corresponding to April 23, 1993, October 11, 1993, October 17, 1993, May 15, 1994, August 13, 1995, and January 5, 1997. However, two entries are listed for May 15, 1994: a flight between Palm Beach International Airport to Reagan National Airport and another flight from Reagan National Airport to Teterboro Airport. Hence, some outlets have reported the number of flights as seven or eight, depending whether they consider those two entries as one flight with a layover or two flights.) According to Epstein, Trump first had sex with Melania Knauss in his private jet.

An anonymous affidavit by "Tiffany Doe" said that Epstein had paid her directly from 1991 to 2000 "to attract adolescent women" to parties at his mansion (Herbert N. Straus House). In the summer of 1994, she lured a minor who expressed interest in modeling. In her affidavit, she said that both "Mr. Trump and Mr. Epstein were advised that she was 13 years old. I personally witnessed four sexual encounters" between Trump and the 13-year-old. In one of the alleged incidents, a 12-year-old girl was simultaneously victimized, and in another, Trump continued assaulting the 13-year-old "despite her pleas to stop". She said that Epstein likewise attempted to rape the 13-year-old on two occasions that she witnessed or learned of. "Tiffany Doe" said she personally witnessed both Trump and Epstein threaten to kill the 13-year-old if she were to tell anyone what had happened and that Trump further warned the victim that he was "capable of having her whole family killed". She signed the affidavit in 2016.

Maria Farmer, the first person to report Epstein and Ghislaine Maxwell to law enforcement, encountered Trump late at night in Epstein's Manhattan office in 1995. Farmer was then in her mid-20s. She described Trump as leering at her in a way that felt threatening until Epstein entered the room and warned him off, saying: "No, no. She's not here for you." Trump and Epstein then left the room, and Farmer overheard Trump say he had assumed Farmer was a teenager. In 1997, Trump inscribed a copy of his book Trump: The Art of the Comeback to Epstein, writing: "You are the greatest!" Epstein and Trump were photographed together at Mar-a-Lago and at a Victoria's Secret Angels event in New York in the same year, and there is video of Epstein and Trump chatting at a Victoria's Secret Fashion Show in New York in 1999. In 2000, Trump and Melania were pictured alongside Epstein and Maxwell. Trump's name was listed in Epstein's partially redacted "black book" of contacts. His name also appeared in a number of court documents related to Epstein that were released in 2024. Trump was not accused of any crime in any of the documents.

=== 2000 recruitment of Virginia Giuffre ===
As a teenager, Virginia Giuffre worked as a locker room attendant in the spa at Mar-a-Lago. There, she met Maxwell, who recruited her as Epstein's masseuse. Trump told reporters on July 28, 2025:

"For years, I wouldn't talk to Jeffrey Epstein... Because he did something that was inappropriate. He hired help and I said, 'Don't ever do that again.' He stole people that worked for me. I said, 'Don't ever do that again.' And he did it again. And I threw him out of the place. Persona non grata. I threw him out and that was it."

The next day, asked by reporters whether any of those workers were "young women" and whether Giuffre was included, Trump replied affirmatively:

"Everyone knows the people that were taken, and ... taking people that work for me is bad. ... yes, they were [young women] ... [workers] were taken out of the [Mar-a-Lago] spa, hired by him [Epstein]. ... I told him, I said, 'Listen, we don't want you taking our people, whether it was spa or not spa. I don't want him taking people.' And he was fine. And then not too long after that, he did it again and I said, 'Out of here.' ... Yeah. He, he stole her [Giuffre]. And by the way, she had no complaints about us as you know."

Despite Trump's 2025 recollection that he expelled Epstein from the club "not too long" after Epstein hired Giuffre in 2000, Epstein had remained a member of Mar-a-Lago until 2007.

=== New York magazine interview and birthday letter (early 2000s) ===
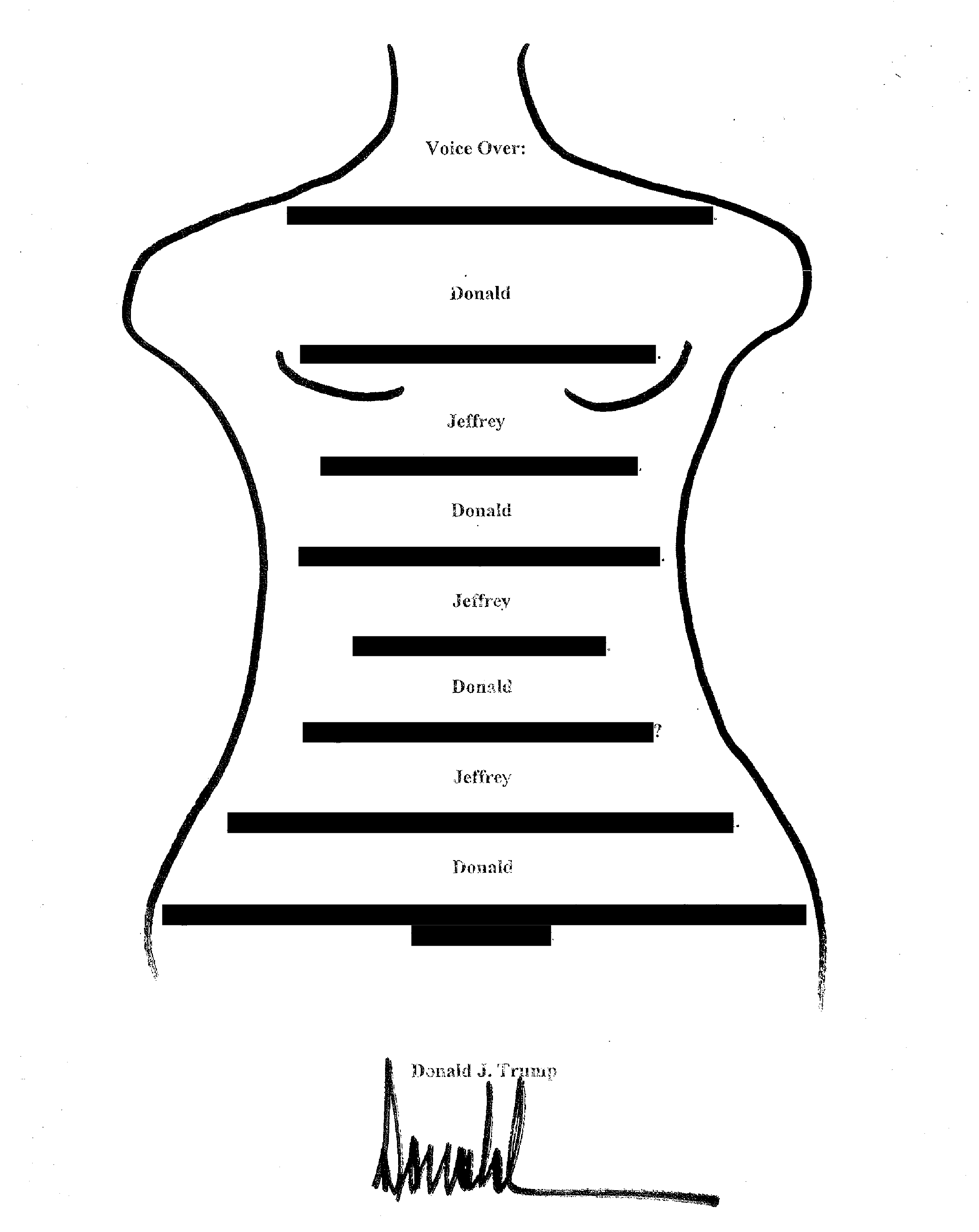
The letter attributed to Donald Trump in Jeffrey Epstein's birthday book (text redacted due to potential copyright concerns)

In 2002, speaking to New York magazine, Trump said:

"I've known Jeff for 15 years. Terrific guy. He's a lot of fun to be with. It is even said that he likes beautiful women as much as I do, and many of them are on the younger side."

According to The Wall Street Journal, in 2003, Trump sent a birthday letter to Epstein that included a drawing of a naked woman. The letter was collected by Epstein's accomplice, Ghislaine Maxwell, for a leather-bound photo album sometime before 2006, and was among the documents examined by the Justice Department which investigated Epstein and Maxwell years ago. The letter, which bore Trump's signature, featured several lines of typewritten text framed by the outline of a naked woman, apparently hand-drawn in a heavy marker. The Wall Street Journal described Trump's "squiggly" signature below the woman's waist as mimicking pubic hair. According to the Journal, the letter contained an imagined dialogue in which Trump tells Epstein that "We have certain things in common, Jeffrey" and Epstein replies "Yes, we do, come to think of it." The dialogue concludes with Trump saying: "A pal is a wonderful thing. Happy Birthday – and may every day be another wonderful secret." Democrats on the House Oversight Committee released a letter matching this description, and apparently signed by Trump, on September 8, 2025. The entire birthday book was made public the following day.

Trump denied having written the letter. However, a judge dismissed his defamation lawsuit against the Journal. Ghislaine Maxwell, in a 2025 interview with Todd Blanche says she does not remember anything from Trump submitted in the birthday book.

On July 17, 2025, The Wall Street Journal published an article about a letter bearing Trump's name that was reportedly included in a birthday album compiled for Jeffrey Epstein. Before its publication, Trump personally contacted the newspaper's owner, Rupert Murdoch, in an attempt to prevent the article from appearing. The following day, Trump filed a $10 billion defamation lawsuit in the United States District Court for the Southern District of Florida, naming Dow Jones & Company, its parent company News Corp, Murdoch, News Corp chief executive Robert Thomson, and journalists Khadeeja Safdar and Joe Palazzolo as defendants. Trump alleged that the article contained knowingly false statements that damaged his reputation. Dow Jones said it had confidence in the accuracy of its reporting and would vigorously defend itself against the lawsuit. On April 13, 2026, U.S. District Judge Darrin P. Gayles dismissed the original complaint without prejudice, finding that Trump had failed to plausibly allege that the defendants had acted with actual malice in publishing the article. The court allowed him to submit an amended complaint, which he filed on May 27. On October 31, 2026, Gayles dismissed the amended complaint with prejudice, ruling that it still failed to plausibly allege actual malice. The judge described the allegations as vague and conclusory, and noted that the article had included Trump's denial of authorship. The dismissal with prejudice barred Trump from refiling the same claims in the case.

Lesley Groff began working as a personal assistant to Epstein in 2001. As she later testified to the House Oversight Committee, she infrequently connected Epstein and Trump by phone, until "there just were no more phone calls to Mr. Trump. ... At the time, I did not know why their relationship ended."

=== Falling out (mid-2000s) ===
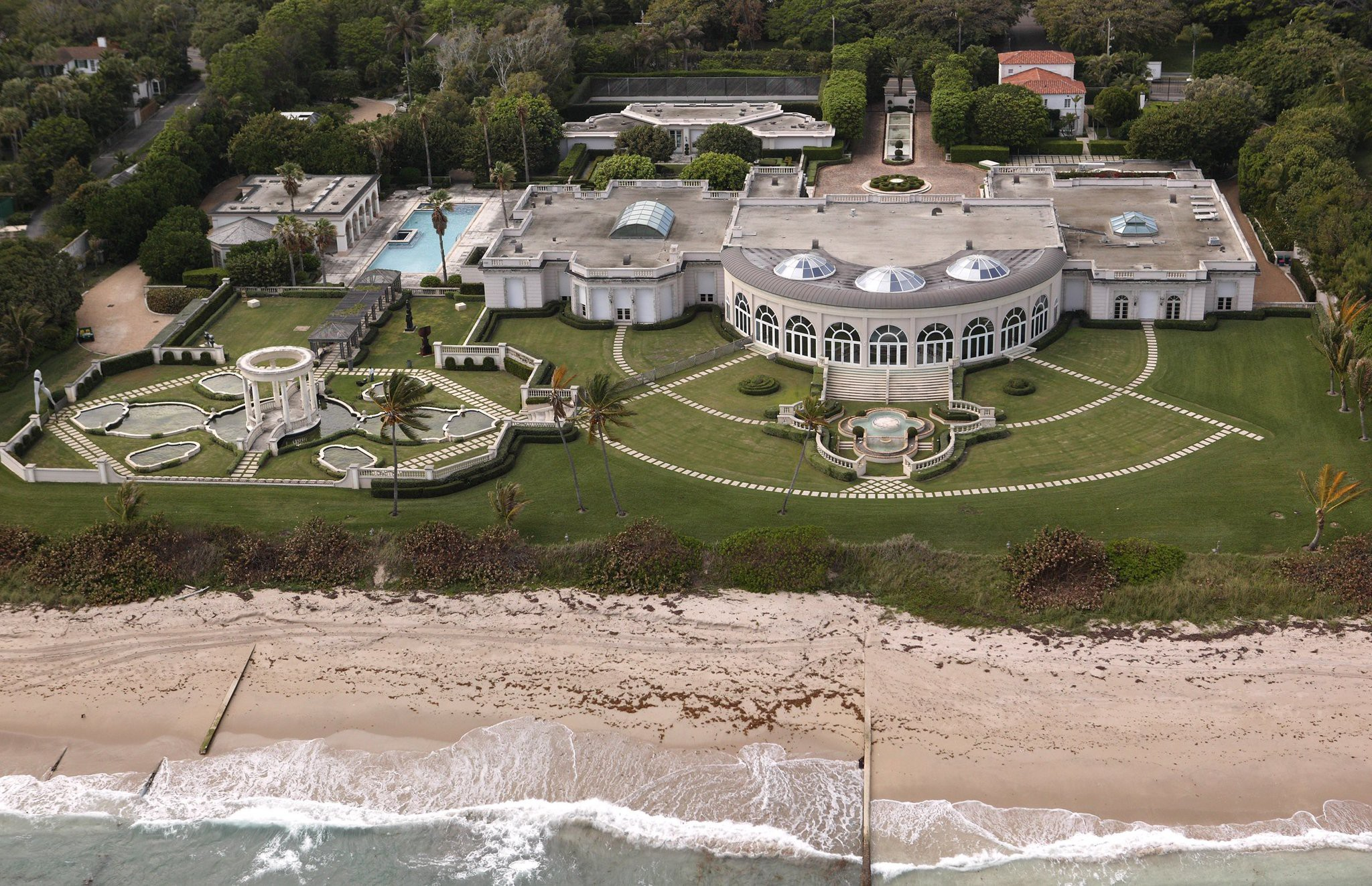
View of the Maison de L'Amitie

In 2004, Trump and Epstein competed to buy the Maison de L'Amitie at its foreclosure auction. Trump outbid Epstein, renovating the house and selling it four years later at a profit. Some media reports have described the outbidding as the end of the Trump–Epstein friendship, with phone records indicating that the two ceased communicating after the fact. (Nonetheless, shortly after the 2016 election, Trump may have called Epstein to chat about his victory, according to Epstein's brother, Mark.) As of Epstein's 2019 arrest, Trump had not confirmed that the bidding caused the end of his friendship with Epstein. (Note: In his book Siege: Trump Under Fire, Michael Wolff claims that Epstein (whom he interviewed for his previous book Fire and Fury) knew Trump "had been loaning his name in real estate deals – that is, for an ample fee, Trump would serve as a front man to disguise the actual ownership in a real estate transaction." So, after losing the auction, "a furious Epstein, certain that Trump was merely fronting for the real owners, threatened to expose the deal ... But if Epstein knew some of Trump's secrets, Trump knew some of Epstein's. ... Just as the enmity between the two friends increased over the house purchase, Epstein found himself under investigation by the Palm Beach police." Wolff reiterated his claim that Trump's purchase of the mansion was likely a money laundering operation and that Epstein believed it was Trump who tipped the police on him, in a July 2025 video posted on Instagram.)

Epstein was investigated by Palm Beach police in April 2005 for soliciting an underage girl for sexual purposes, leading to a June 2006 indictment by a grand jury of one count of solicitation of prostitution. The FBI began investigating in July 2006, and the U.S. Attorney's Office indicted him in June 2007. Michael Reiter, the Palm Beach police chief at the time, said during a 2019 FBI interview that Trump called him in July 2006 and thanked him for "stopping [Epstein]", as "everyone has known he's been doing this". According to Reiter, Trump said that Maxwell was Epstein's "operative" and "evil", and suggested that he investigate her. Reiter's account contradicts Trump's July 2019 claims that he did not know Epstein was abusing girls.

=== 2007 ban from Mar-a-Lago ===
According to a 2020 book, after Epstein was said to have sexually harassed a teenage daughter of another Mar-a-Lago member in 2007, Trump revoked his Mar-a-Lago membership. The 2016 book Filthy Rich detailed that the teen had told her father "while relaxing at Mar-a-Lago, she had been approached and invited out to Epstein's house. The girl said that she had gone and that Epstein had tried to get her to undress. The girl's father had gone directly to Trump, who—in no uncertain terms—told Epstein that he was barred from Mar-a-Lago." Mar-a-Lago's registry shows Epstein was a member until October 2007, according to the 2020 book The Grifter's Club. The New York Times reports that Trump gave the same explanation to associates, and that in 2009, Brad Edwards, an attorney for a number of Epstein's victims, was told something similar by Trump.

Citing conversations with former Mar-a-Lago and Epstein employees, The Wall Street Journal reported in 2025 that Mar-a-Lago had dispatched spa employees—most commonly young women—to Epstein's nearby mansion for various spa services and did so for several years. In that time, according to former Mar-a-Lago employees, Epstein exposed himself and was otherwise sexually suggestive towards the employees. These spa employees said they actively warned each other about Epstein, but these house calls did not cease until 2003; according to these accounts, Trump agreed to remove Epstein from Mar-a-Lago after an 18-year-old beautician told her managers that Epstein had pressured her for sex. Trump's second presidential administration denied Trump as ever sending teenage workers to Epstein's mansion after being asked by TMZ. White House Press Secretary Karoline Leavitt accused the original Wall Street Journal story of being full of "fallacies and innuendo."

Another alternative account came from Representative Jamie Raskin in 2026 after he was shown unredacted Epstein documents. According to Raskin, he found a document in which Trump admitted he had "never asked [Epstein] to leave" Mar-a-Lago, seeming to contradict Trump's assertion that he had removed Epstein from the club. Raskin found that, in the publicly released documents, that information was redacted but stated "JE ever expelled from Mara Lago. No he was not a member may have been a guest never asked to leave." In response to a request for comment from Newsweek, Trump's White House insisted that the redactions had to do with "personally identifiable information" for certain individuals, such as Epstein's victims.

=== After Epstein's conviction (2008–2019) ===
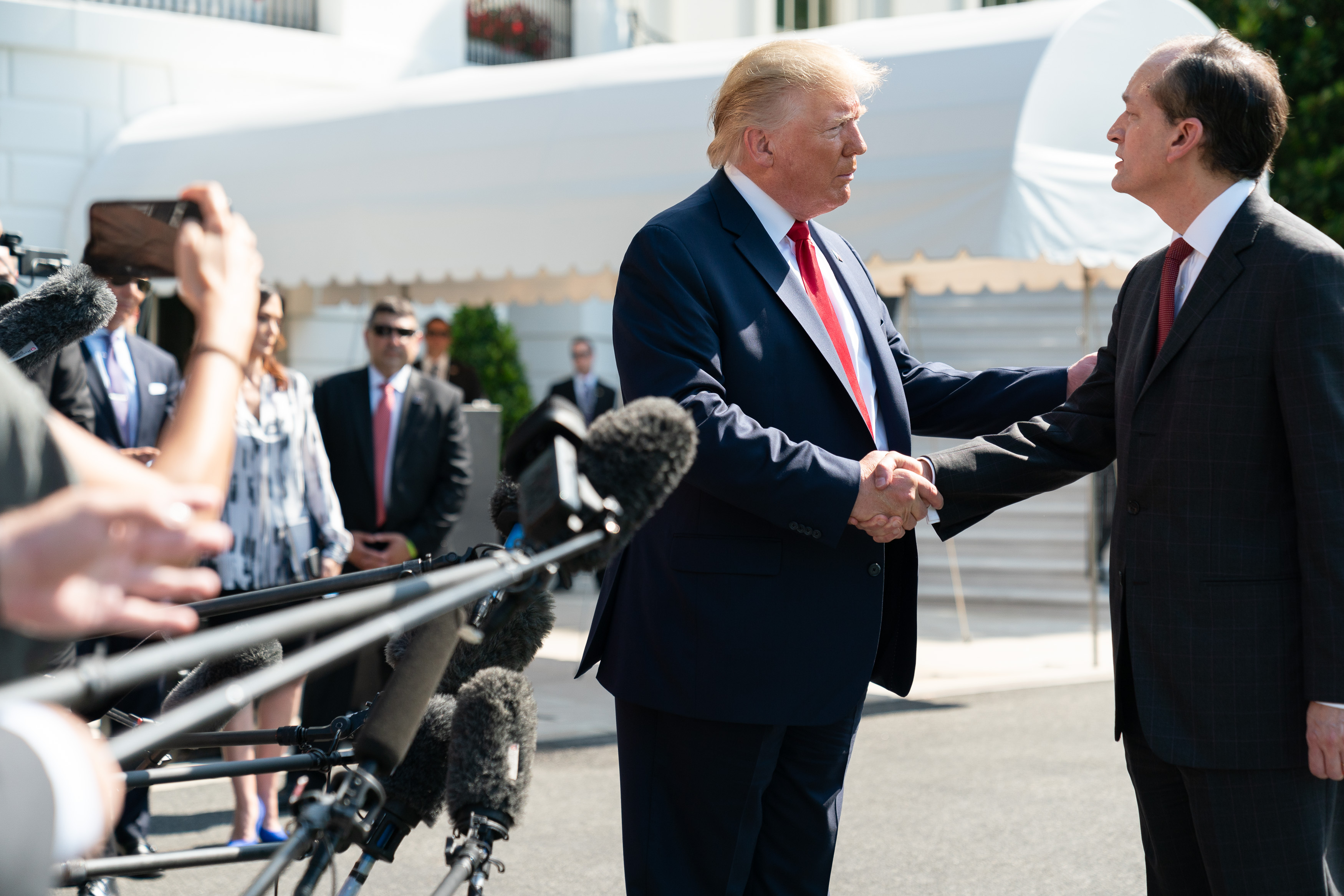
Then-labor secretary Alexander Acosta (right) shaking hands with Trump on the day of his resignation in 2019

Epstein pleaded guilty to a charge of felony solicitation and another of procuring a person under the age of 18 for prostitution in June 2008. The plea deal was approved by U.S. attorney Alexander Acosta, an appointee of President George W. Bush. Acosta would go on to be appointed as Labor Secretary by Trump nearly a decade later. According to Lisa Bloom, who represented Epstein's accusers, "Trump was willing to overlook Acosta's sweetheart deal with Epstein when he appointed Acosta, even though many raised this issue at the time". Acosta resigned in July 2019 amid criticism over his Epstein plea deal, with Trump saying that he did not play a role in the resignation and praising Acosta's "tremendous talent".

In 2015, Trump adviser Roger Stone published The Clintons' War on Women in which he quoted a Mar-a-Lago member who remembered Trump having said that Epstein had "beautiful young girls" in his Palm Beach swimming pool. Trump allegedly said: "'How nice,' I thought, 'he [Epstein] let the neighborhood kids use his pool.'" According to documents reviewed by The Wall Street Journal in 2023, Epstein attempted to meet Trump associates Thomas Barrack and Peter Thiel in 2016.

In April 2016, an anonymous woman using the pseudonym "Katie Johnson" filed a lawsuit in California accusing both Trump and Epstein of forcibly raping her when she was 13 years old at underage sex parties at Epstein's Manhattan residence in 1994. The case was dismissed the following month. A second version of the lawsuit was filed in New York in June by the same woman as "Jane Doe" claiming to have been raped and sexually assaulted by the pair at four 1994 parties when she was 13. The lawsuit was refiled in September, and on November 2, Doe was scheduled to appear at a press conference at the office of Lisa Bloom before abruptly canceling; Bloom said Jane Doe had received multiple threats. The lawsuit was withdrawn two days later.

Anticipating the publication of the exposé Filthy Rich: The Shocking True Story of Jeffrey Epstein – The Billionaire's Sex Scandal, written by James Patterson and John Connolly with Tim Malloy, the Trump biographer Michael Wolff counseled Epstein. In a 2016 email, Wolff suggested that Epstein throw Trump under the bus. "[Y]ou do need an immediate counter narrative to the book. I believe Trump offers an ideal opportunity. It's a chance to make the story about something other than you, while, at the same time, letting you frame your own story." The email was released by the House Oversight Committee in 2025. According to Epstein's brother, Mark, Trump called Jeffrey Epstein after winning the 2016 U.S. presidential election. "Trump was sort of surprised himself that he won", Mark said. "So Jeffrey said [Trump] called him like, you know, 'Could you believe this?' type of a phone call."

Trump, in 2019, talks about his relationship with Epstein.

In 2017, Epstein told Wolff that he had been Trump's "closest friend for 10 years". He also criticized the first Trump administration and said that Trump was "a horrible human being" who would do "nasty things to his best friends, his best friends' wives, anyone who he first tries to gain their trust and uses it to do bad things to them". Wolff had taped the remark as part of research for his 2018 book Fire and Fury; he published the tape in 2024. In 2019, after Epstein was arrested under sex trafficking charges, Trump said that he had not been in contact with Epstein for 15 years. At a White House press conference on July 12, a reporter asked whether Trump had had "any suspicions that he [Epstein] was molesting young women, underaged women?" Trump replied: "No, I had no idea." Trump later promoted conspiracy theories surrounding Epstein's death in custody. Later that year, amid widespread criticism of Epstein associate Prince Andrew after being accused of sexual abuse by Giuffre, Trump claimed during an interview to not know Andrew, despite multiple sources and photographic evidence showing they had met on several occasions. In 2020, on the topic of Maxwell's criminal prosecution, Trump said that "I do wish her well. I'm not looking for anything bad for her". Trump later doubled down on his wish to Maxwell, stating that "I'd wish a lot of people well. Good luck. Let them prove somebody was guilty."

During Maxwell's 2021 trial, a woman who said that she was groomed as a minor by Maxwell testified that Epstein had introduced her to Trump at the age of 14. She did not accuse Trump of any illegal behavior or explain why she was introduced to him.

In a 2025 interview with Todd Blanche, Ghislaine Maxwell said she never saw Trump in any inappropriate setting. Maxwell also claims she never saw Trump receive a massage and that she does not recall a letter from Trump in Epstein's birthday book

== 2025 congressional investigation ==
=== Birthday book revelations ===
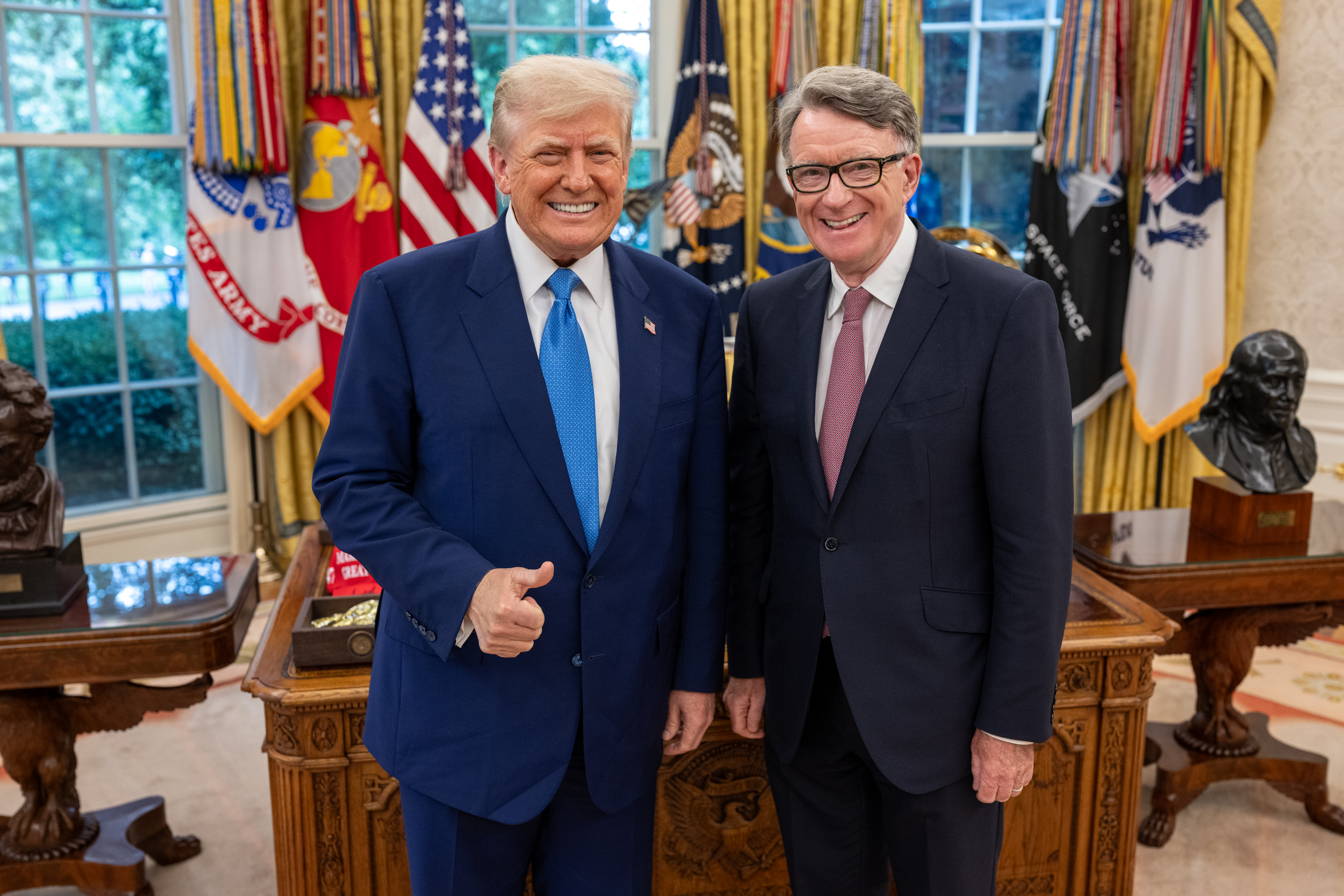
Trump and Mandelson (pictured) met a number of times in 2025. Trump said in September that he did not know him.

In September 2025, the House Oversight Committee released a 2003 birthday book created by Maxwell for Epstein's 50th birthday, titled The First Fifty Years. The album included a note allegedly signed by Trump, featuring a drawing and a typewritten message. Trump denied writing or signing the note and his legal team has disputed its authenticity citing supposed signature irregularities, but a New York Times comparison with contemporary first name signatures of Trump suggested strong similarities. Coverage of the release described the disputed note as adding renewed public and media attention to Trump's past association with Epstein.

The book led to the sacking of British Ambassador to the United States Peter Mandelson following widespread criticism over his own association with Epstein. As the scandal began shortly before the state visit by Trump to the United Kingdom, it created a diplomatic predicament for Trump, and his team were reportedly concerned about the timing, as Mandelson's dismissal over his links to Epstein could've shone an unwelcome spotlight on Trump's own past association with him. A source with knowledge of the White House's discussions said that Trump's team was "nervy" about anything that could resurface the Epstein scandal, and they were concerned Mandelson's dismissal will overshadow the UK state visit. The Guardian noted that with Trump having his own well-documented links to Epstein, "there is no subject he wants to revisit less" than the scandal surrounding Mandelson's ties to him. For Trump, whose priority was to avoid distractions during the state visit, the controversy arrived at an "especially awkward" time.

During a September 18, 2025, press conference in the UK, Trump claimed he did not know who Mandelson was, despite having met him multiple times. Trump made the statement when asked if he had any sympathy for Mandelson after he was dismissed from his role as ambassador. In response, Trump stated: "I don't know him, actually." He added that it was a choice made by the Prime Minister and suggested Keir Starmer was better placed to speak on the matter. Despite Trump's claim of not knowing Mandelson, multiple sources and photographic evidence show they have met on several occasions. In May 2025, Mandelson stood with Trump in the Oval Office during the announcement of a US-UK trade framework. Photos captured the two shaking hands and smiling together. According to Mandelson, Trump commented on his "beautiful accent" during one Oval Office meeting. Mandelson also received a signed note from Trump that read, "Peter, great job!".

=== Epstein emails mentioning Trump ===
On November 12, 2025, Democrats on the House Oversight Committee released emails obtained from Epstein's estate under subpoena. None of these emails involved Trump or Trump's staff communicating directly with Epstein, but Trump is mentioned at least 1,500 times. In many, which dated back to 2011, Epstein insinuated that he had damaging information on Trump. A spokeswoman for Republicans on the Committee responded that Democrats "carelessly cherry-pick documents to generate click bait". Trump stated about the emails that "the Democrats are using the Jeffrey Epstein Hoax to try and deflect from their massive failures, in particular, their most recent one – THE SHUTDOWN!" White House Press Secretary Karoline Leavitt said the emails had been "selectively leaked" by House Democrats to liberal media outlets in an attempt to create a false narrative about President Trump.

==== Exchanges with Ghislaine Maxwell ====
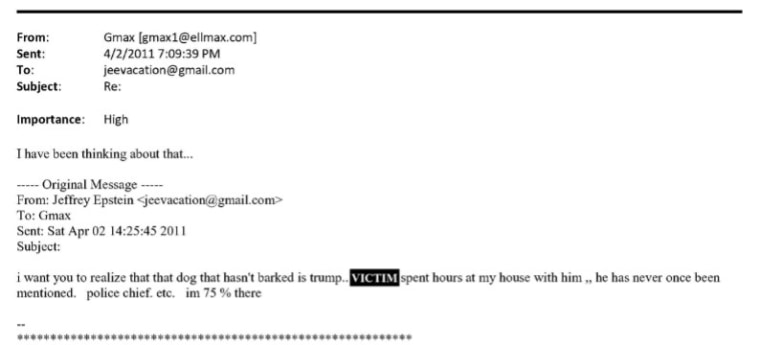
Epstein told Maxwell that Trump had spent hours at his house with Giuffre and that Trump was "the dog that hasn't barked". Maxwell answered with "I have been thinking about that".

An email sent from Epstein to Maxwell in April 2011 referenced Trump's relationship with an unnamed victim, whose name the Committee redacted: "I want you to realize that that dog that hasn't barked is trump.. [VICTIM] spent hours at my house with him,, he has never once been mentioned." [sic] Maxwell replied with an email stating "I have been thinking about that". According to Republican committee members and Trump's White House, the alleged victim was Virginia Giuffre, who had worked for Trump until, as Trump phrased it, Epstein "stole her". Giuffre had never accused Trump of any misconduct and stated in her memoir that "Trump couldn't have been friendlier".

==== Exchanges with public officials ====
On February 8, 2017, Epstein wrote to former Treasury Secretary Lawrence Summers: "i [sic] have met some very bad people,, none as bad as trump [sic]. not [sic] one decent cell in his body.. so yes- dangerous." He wrote to Summers in the following year: "Trump – borderline insane". After Trump's personal lawyer Michael Cohen pleaded guilty to felony charges related to his hush money payments to Stormy Daniels in 2018, Epstein told Obama's former White House lawyer Kathy Ruemmler in August that "you see, I know how dirty donald [sic] is. My guess is that non lawyers [sic] ny [sic] biz people have no idea. What it means to have your fixer flip." [sic] When Ruemmler called Trump "so gross" in an email, Epstein replied "worse in real life and upclose."

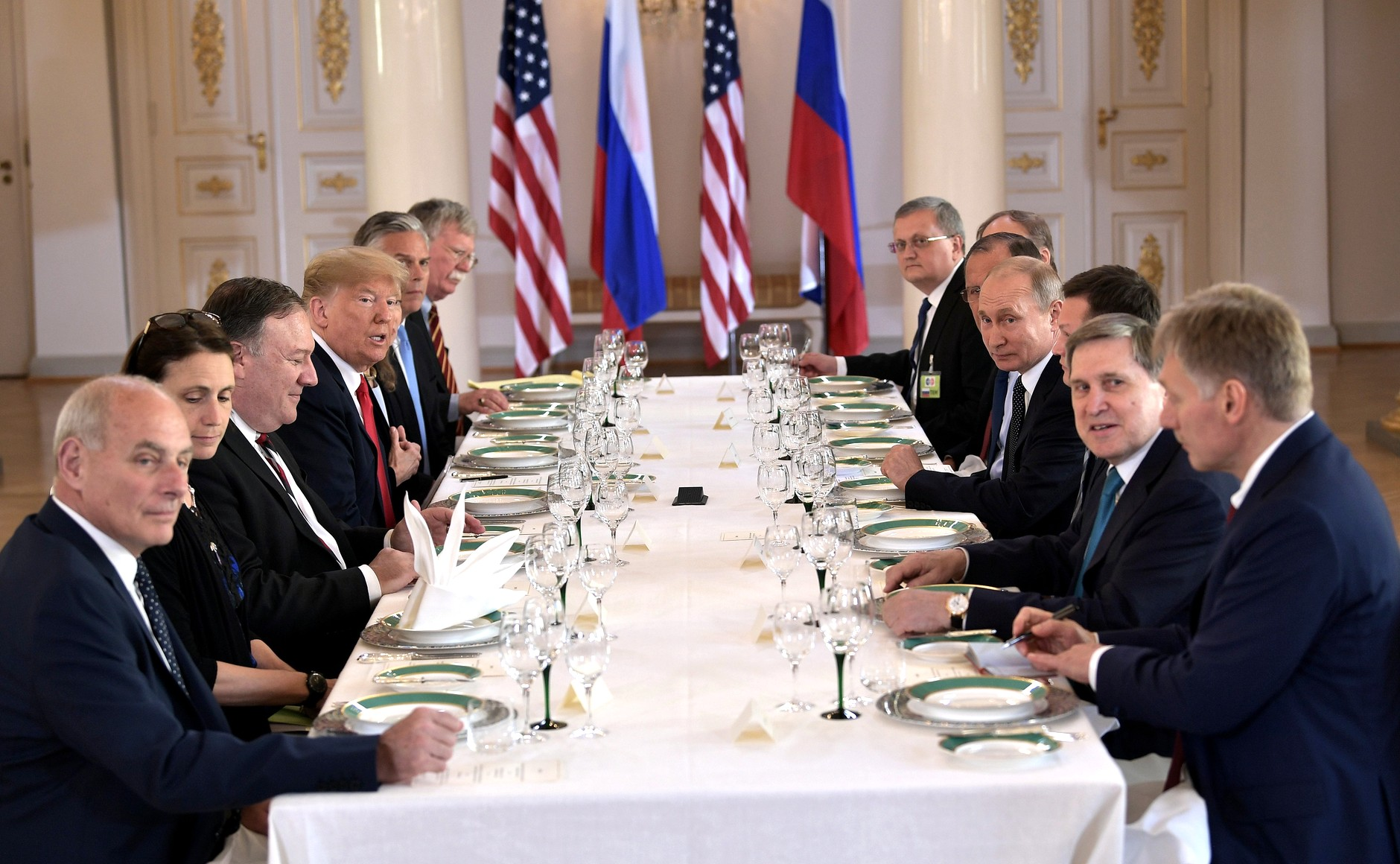
Trump in his Helsinki meeting with Putin and Lavrov (first behind Putin) on July 16, 2018

A month prior to Trump's meeting with Vladimir Putin in Helsinki in 2018, Epstein emailed former Norwegian prime minister and then-Council of Europe leader Thorbjorn Jagland that he had talked to Russian United Nations ambassador Vitaly Churkin, stating that "[h]e understood trump [sic] after our conversations. it [sic] is not complex. he must be seen to get something its [sic] that simple". Epstein had previously asked Jagland to establish a connection with Russian foreign minister Sergei Lavrov, telling him that "I think you might suggest to putin [sic] that lavrov [sic] can get insight on talking to me", and adding that "Vitaly churkin [sic] used to but he died." Jagland told Epstein that "I'll meet Lavrovs [sic] assistant on Monday and will suggest".

==== Exchanges with Mark Epstein ====
Epstein was told by his brother Mark in early 2018 to ask Trump's former advisor Steve Bannon "if Putin has the photos of Trump blowing Bubba". Mark also told Jeffrey that "You and your boy Donnie can make a remake of the movie Get Hard," referencing the movie in which a former inmate tries to prepare a white collar criminal for prison.

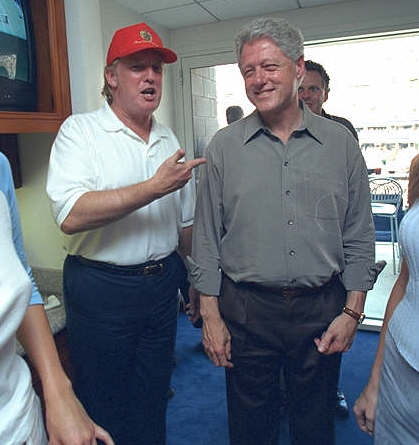
Trump and Clinton in September 2000

Mark's comment on "Trump blowing Bubba" prompted speculation that the person supposedly engaging in a sexual act with Trump was former president Bill Clinton, who had a relationship with both Trump and Epstein. "Bubba" was also one of Clinton's nicknames. Mark said in November 2025 that the message was a joke and that "Bubba" did not refer to Clinton. Mark's spokeswoman told The Advocate that "Bubba" was "a private individual who is not a public figure".

==== Exchanges with Michael Wolff ====
In an email sent by Epstein to Wolff in December 2015, Epstein offered "photos [sic] of donald and girls in bikinis in my kitchen", and claimed that he "gave" a 20-year-old Celina Midelfart to Trump after dating her for two years in 1993. He said that Trump had once been "so focused he walked straight into the door" watching young women swimming in a pool at Epstein's property. Epstein said that one of the "girls in bikinis" was Lauren Petrella. According to a 1997 sexual harassment lawsuit by Jill Harth that was later withdrawn, Trump allegedly made unwanted sexual advances toward Petrella.

An email sent from Epstein to Wolff in 2019 read: "Trump said he asked me to resign, never a member ever. Of course he knew about the girls as he asked ghislaine [sic] to stop." According to NBC News and Axios, Epstein was apparently referencing the time when Trump expelled him from Mar-a-Lago for, Trump's White House stated, "being a creep". Trump had previously said that Epstein "took people that worked for me", which had prompted him to tell Epstein to "stay the hell out of here".

==== Exchanges with Steve Bannon ====
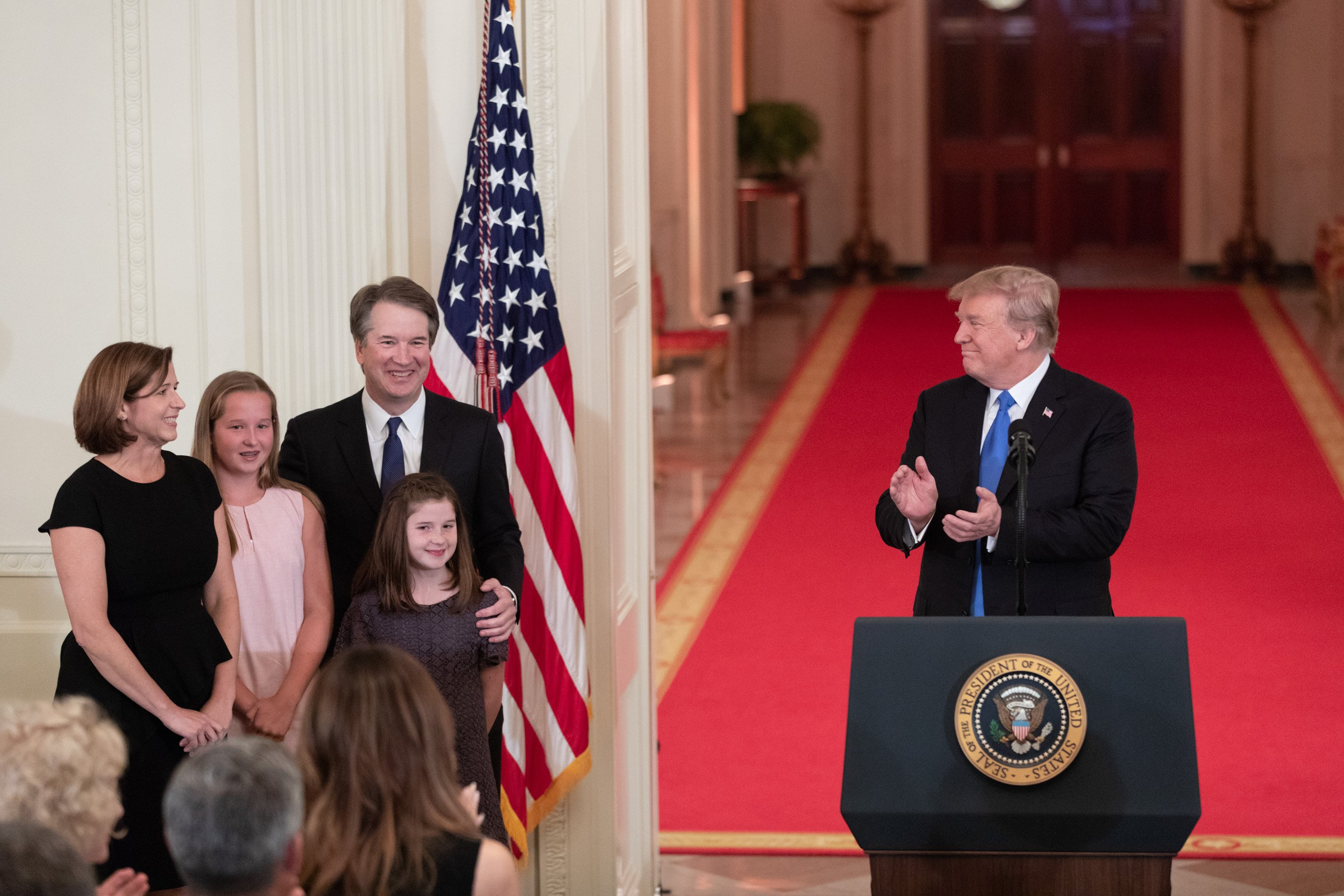
Kavanaugh as Trump announced his nomination in July 2018

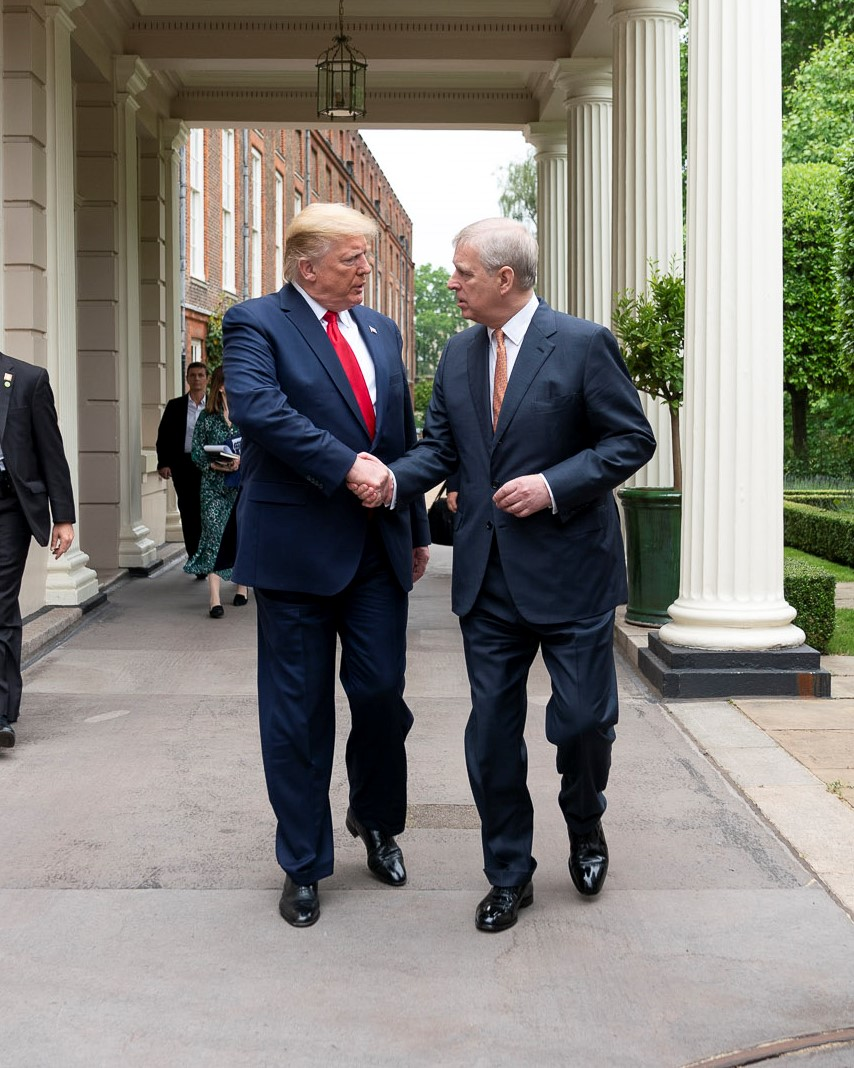
Trump's meeting with Andrew, which Epstein described as "funny", telling Bannon that the latter's accuser had come from Mar-a-Lago. Bannon replied that he was surprised that "nobody is making u the connective tissue".

In a chain of emails from August 2018, Epstein coached Bannon on how to publicly defend Trump's policies on immigration, security clearance revocations and the Trump tax cuts. He also gave Bannon feedback on his pro-Trump media appearances. Bannon had been fired by Trump in 2017, but the pair continued to be in contact after the fact.

During Trump nominee Brett Kavanaugh's Supreme Court confirmation hearing in 2018, Epstein advised Bannon on how to undermine the credibility of Christine Blasey Ford, who had accused Kavanaugh of sexual assault. He suggested to Bannon that Ford could be accused of taking medication that could cause memory loss. Epstein wrote to Bannon, referring to Trump associates Peter Thiel and Anthony Scaramucci: "Im [sic] back wed. [sic] ( Thiel coming )". He later emailed a list of priorities to Bannon, which included: "1. Peter Thiel in town... 4. The mooch [sic] [Scaramucci] ( still in contact with Ivanka ) has reached out to me, and asked how he can re engage [sic] with you.?? I ve [sic] only met him once. odd." After Trump publicly met Andrew Mountbatten-Windsor (then Prince Andrew, Duke of York) in the United Kingdom in June 2019, Epstein sent an email to Bannon, stating: "Recall prince Andrew [sic] accuser came out of Mar-a-Lago. Prince Andrew and Trump today tooo [sic] funny." Bannon replied with: "Can't believe nobody is making u the connective tissue". According to Forbes, the accuser in question was likely Giuffre, who had worked at Mar-a-Lago before meeting Epstein through Maxwell. She has publicly accused Andrew, Maxwell and Epstein of sexual misconduct.

==== Emails sent to his own email address ====
In a 2019 message sent to his own email address, Epstein stated that Trump never got any massage. Epstein said that Trump had met with an alleged sexual abuse victim who had "worked at Mara Lago [sic]," adding that "Trump knew of it, and came to my house many times during that period. The testimony of the houseman John Alessi confirmed it. He never got a massage."

==== Other exchanges ====
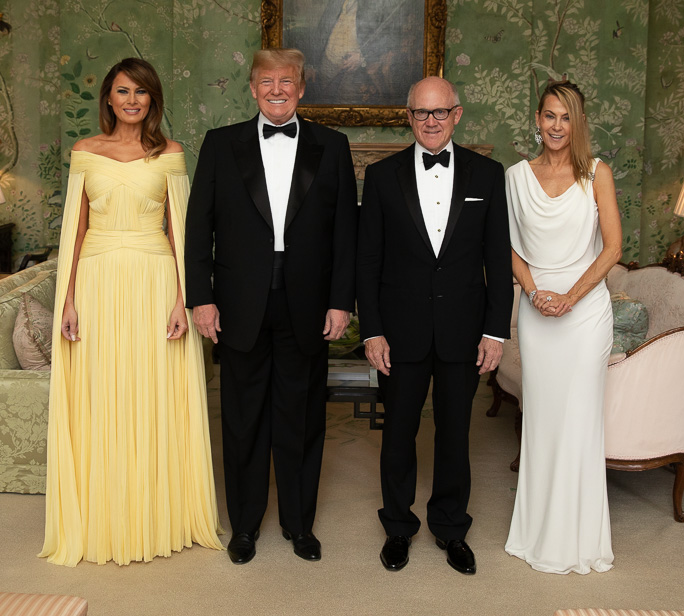
Trump and Johnson in 2018

On November 23, 2017, Epstein emailed modeling agency founder Faith Kates that he would spend Thanksgiving with "eva". Kates replied that "Glenn" would be "down there", and Epstein replied that "david fizel, hanson, trump" would be there as well. Trump was then president and is known to have been at Mar-a-Lago for Thanksgiving.

Epstein was asked by billionaire fundraiser Woody Johnson in October 2016 "[h]ow plausible is [sic] idea that trump [sic] is [sic] real cocaine user?" Epstein replied with "zero", before inviting him to a "dinner with rothchild [sic] in new york [sic]". A fundraiser and advisor of Trump during the 2016 election, Johnson would later be appointed by Trump as ambassador to the United Kingdom.

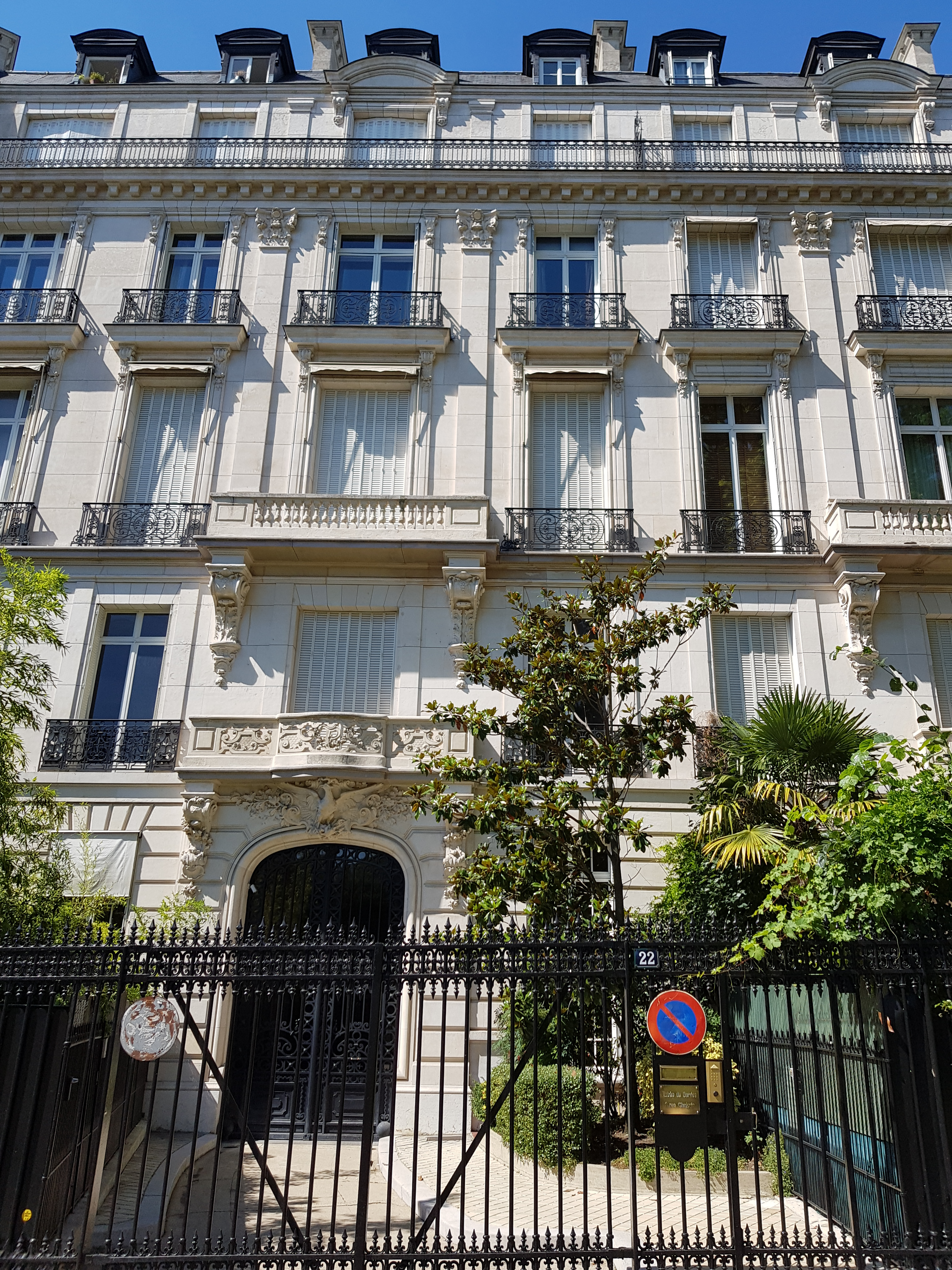
Epstein's apartment in Avenue Foch, Paris

Following the publication of a December 2018 article on the Miami Herald which stated that Trump's labor secretary had negotiated Epstein's plea deal, an unidentified person told Epstein that "they're really just trying to take down Trump and doing whatever they can to do that". Epstein replied with "yes thx. its [sic] wild. because [sic] i [sic] am the one able to take him down." Epstein invited an alleged sexual abuse victim to his Paris apartment in late 2017. The person, whose name was redacted by House Democrats, wrote to him "I m [sic] at the door but I will wait for my time.. i [sic] don't want to come early to find Trump in your house" with two laughing emojis. Trump was in the United States at the time of the exchange.

== Political ramifications ==
Trump's relationship with Epstein received significant media attention in 2025 due to the unwillingness of the Trump administration to release files relating to Epstein, despite Trump's earlier promises to do so during the 2024 campaign. Trump received significant amounts of blowback from the media, the public, and even many of his supporters for this decision. While Trump has attempted to distance himself from Epstein and downplay their association, some of the MAGA movement's most fervent supporters grew increasingly vocal in demanding the release of Epstein-related files, leading to visible fractures within his support base. Republican House speaker Mike Johnson, a staunch ally of Trump who had a history of delaying congressional votes against the president, prevented a voting session for authorization to release the Epstein files on 22 July via an early adjournment.

After U.S. attorney general Pam Bondi and other Trump officials had for months teased the imminent release of incendiary information (the "Jeffrey Epstein client list") from FBI records of the investigation into Epstein's sex trafficking operation, Bondi stated in a memo released in July 2025 that there was no evidence that Epstein had such a list or that he had blackmailed prominent individuals. The memo also confirmed that Epstein had committed suicide while in custody. The announcement caused an uproar among some of Trump's most fervent supporters who had bought into the conspiracy theory that Epstein was at the center of "a cabal of powerful men and celebrities, largely Democrats" and that the government had covered it up. In social media posts, Trump said the continuing demands for release of the files were a hoax perpetrated by Democrats, and that his supporters pressing for release were "stupid", "foolish", and "past supporters".

Deputy Attorney General Todd Blanche met with Maxwell on July 24 and 25, 2025 at the U.S. attorney's office in Tallahassee. Maxwell told Blanche (according to the transcript released a month later) that Trump and Epstein were not "close friends", contradicting Epstein previously stating he was Trump's closest friend.

In October 2026, House Democrats on the House Judiciary Committee called for the appointment of a special counsel to investigate Trump's ties to Epstein and possible wrongdoing in the government’s handling of the Epstein inquiry.

=== Epstein Files Transparency Act ===
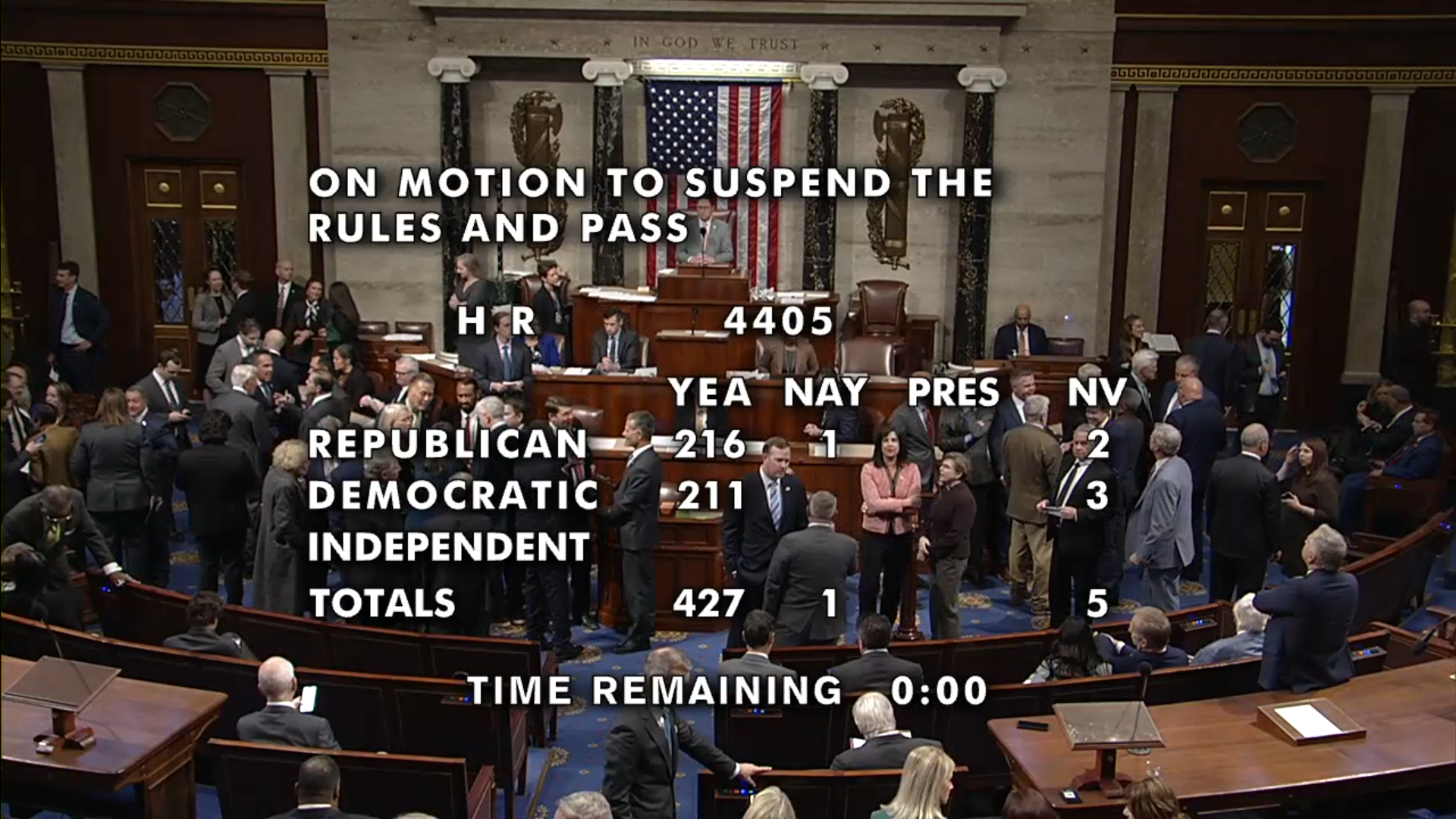
U.S. House voting on the bill

After opposing the bill for months, Trump reversed his stance on November 17 and called for Congress Republicans to "vote to release the Epstein files, because we have nothing to hide". The following day, Trump called for ABC News's broadcast license to be revoked after he was asked by the network's Mary Bruce about the Epstein files. On November 18, 2025, the U.S. House of Representatives voted 427–1 pass a bill to force the Department of Justice to release available documents relating to Epstein and his associates. Republican Clay Higgins was the sole representative to vote against the bill. House speaker Mike Johnson voted for the bill while falsely claiming that it would release sensitive information about victims. The United States Senate unanimously approved the bill only hours later, after Democratic senator Chuck Schumer triggered a unanimous consent procedure.

==== Released documents ====
The Department of Justice began releasing documents related to Epstein on December 19, with the ones that were released being heavily redacted. Less than one day later, file #468, which showed a photograph of Trump and Epstein together, was removed from the website. The file was later restored. A file released on December 23, 2025, was an email from a Manhattan assistant U.S. attorney, who stated Epstein's flight records revealed that "Donald Trump traveled on Epstein's private jet many more times than previously has been reported (or that we were aware), including during the period we would expect to charge in a Maxwell case."

===== Epstein's alleged letter to Larry Nassar =====
On December 23, the Department of Justice released a letter allegedly written by Epstein to American sex offender Larry Nassar a few days before Epstein's death in August 2019. The existence of the letter allegedly sent to Nassar by Epstein had been first reported by the Associated Press in 2023. Epstein allegedly told Nassar in the letter that "[w]e shared one thing ... our love and caring for young ladies and the hope they'd reach their full potential", and that "Our President also shares our love of young, nubile girls. When a young beauty walked by he loved to "grab snatch", whereas we ended up snatching grub in the mess halls of the system". Trump was president of the United States at the time.

A statement published by the Department of Justice on the same day stated, without directly referencing Epstein's letter to Nassar, that some documents recently released contained false and sensational claims about Trump, and that if such accusations "had a shred of credibility, they certainly would have been weaponized against President Trump already". The DOJ said the letter was fake, stating that there were "several irregularities with the note and the envelope that held it." The DOJ noted that "The writing does not appear to match Jeffrey Epstein's" and that "The return address did not list the jail where Epstein was held and did not include his inmate number, which is required for outgoing mail". They further noted that the envelope had a postmark from northern Virginia while Epstein was detained in New York. The letter was also postmarked three days after Epstein died.

===== Allegations sent to the NTOC =====
On January 30, 2026, the DOJ released an email titled "NTOC Names" from August 6, 2025, which contained a report from the FBI's National Threat Operations Center (NTOC) describing sexual allegations made against Trump, including some involving Epstein. The email was sent from a Tactical Specialist-Staff Operations Specialist, as part of the Child Exploitation & Human Trafficking Task Force in the FBI New York Field Office. The allegations originated from unverified tips made to the NTOC by phone or electronically. Some of those who submitted the information left no contact information or were reporting second hand information. The New York Times said they weren't able to corroborate any of the allegations. Other files also revealed that the FBI had in fact secretly investigated Epstein-related allegations against Trump, with some being described as "not credible."

====== 1984 Lake Michigan allegation ======
One of the files released around December 24, 2025, contains a woman's tip to the NTOC on August 3, 2020, during the 2020 United States presidential election campaign. The woman claimed that she was trafficked to Epstein in 1984, at the age of 13, and gave birth that year. She alleges that her uncle killed her child and threw the body into Lake Michigan, while Trump watched. She further claims that Trump "[paid me] to force me to [redacted] with him". It is unknown if the FBI ever investigated her claims. A Snopes article said the date of the allegations "did not line up with the established timeline of Trump's friendship with Epstein", and that neither had ties to Lake Michigan at the time. They were not able to substantiate any of the claims in the tip.

====== 1990 (circa) oral rape allegation ======
The NTOC received a complaint that alleges that Trump forced a 13–14 year old female to perform oral sex on him. According to the complaint, the girl bit Trump while performing the sex act. The alleged victim also claims to have been abused by Epstein. The complainant is a female friend of the alleged victim who claims this took place approximately 35 years ago in New Jersey. This lead was described in an internal FBI PowerPoint deck detailing "prominent names" in the Epstein and Maxwell investigations.

Unlike many NTOC allegations investigators considered unverifiable or not credible, this lead was sent to the FBI's Washington office and the accuser was interviewed by the FBI four times. As of March 2026, only one of these interview transcripts has been released to the public, and that interview does not address the Trump incident. On March 6, 2026, DOJ released 16 pages of summaries of the interviews with the alleged victim, claiming they were previously withheld because they were "incorrectly coded as duplicative".

The FBI summaries state the alleged victim recalls being introduced to Trump who immediately disliked her because she was a "boy-girl" – meaning a tomboy. She claims when left alone in a room with him, Trump said "Let me teach you how little girls are supposed to be", unzipped his pants and forced her head down to his penis. The report says she then immediately "bit the shit out of it", and that in response he "pulled her hair and punched her on the side of the head". Trump said something to the effect of "get this little bitch the hell out of here" and kicked her out. She told the FBI she bit him because he "disgusted" her.

Aspects of her story have been corroborated through public records, though none that relate directly to the claims about Trump.

According to a log of Maxwell discovery material and serial numbers stamped on the released files, as of March 2026, 37 pages of records related to these interviews remain missing from the public release of Epstein files.

====== 1995 limousine allegation ======
A document dated to October 2020 made reference to a report by a limousine driver about a "very concerning" phone call Trump had while being driven by him in 1995. The man, whose name was redacted, said that Trump had referenced "Epstein" and "abusing some girl" during the call. The unidentified man also quoted a woman saying, about Trump, that "he raped me". The man further said that "Donald J. Trump had raped her along with Jeffrey Epstein". According to a released document, the alleged rape victim told the driver in late 1999 that she had made a police report. He was then informed in the following year that the woman had been "found with her head 'blown off' in Kiefer, OK" and that her death was deemed by police as definitely not a suicide, while "Corner stated it was a suicide". The DOJ described the claims as "untrue and sensationalist" on December 23, 2025. On January 30, 2026, the DOJ's released "NTOC Names" email from August 2025 provided additional details to this allegation, revealing the limousine driver was taking Trump to Dallas-Forth Worth International Airport in 1995. During the ride, the limousine driver talked about being "a few seconds from pulling the limousine over on the median and within a few seconds of pulling him [Trump] out of the car and hurting him due to some of the things he was saying". This summary reports that the limousine driver's "ex-girlfriend': [redacted] were victims of Epstein's and one was murdered".

====== 1995–1996 Trump Golf Course allegation ======
Another allegation in the report accused Trump of being a client for sex-trafficking at the Trump Golf Course in Rancho Palos Verdes, California from 1995 to 1996. She claims that Ghislaine Maxwell acted as a broker for sex parties for Epstein, Trump, and Robin Leach. She claims to have been threatened to stay silent on this by Trump's then head of security. The complainant claims to have been a participant in some of the orgies and that she heard rumors of girls going missing by being murdered and buried at the facility. However, the report also indicates that this complainant was spoken to and was deemed as not credible.

====== Victoria's Secret Models allegation ======
One alleged victim in the DOJ's "NTOC Names" email report claims that at 16 years old while working as a model, herself, other young girls and older models for Victoria's Secret, were involved in "big orgy parties" with Trump and Bill Clinton at Epstein's residence in New York. The alleged victim also claims that Epstein sexually assaulted her.

====== Mar-a-Lago allegation ======
A complaint from 2020 alleges that Trump raped her at 13 years old at a party in Mar-a-Lago. The complainant accuses Trump of attending multiple of these parties where he would stick his finger into the vaginas and vulvas of children to rate them on their tightness in order to auction them off. The alleged victim claims that many of them were taken into rooms and forced to be sexually penetrated by Trump, alongside giving him oral sex. The complainant alleges that elders such as Elon Musk, Donald Trump Jr., Ivanka Trump, Eric Trump, Alan Dershowitz, and Robert Shapiro were in attendance. One of the files released showed an email was sent by an unknown person on September 28, 2012, asking what Epstein would "think of going to Mar-a-Lago after xmas instead of his island?". Both the sender and recipient of the email were redacted in the release. Trump has said that he ended ties with Epstein in 2004.

== Commentary ==
During the 2026 Iran war, critics of Trump mocked him by nicknaming the war the "Operation Epstein Distraction" or "Operation Epstein Fury" (in reference to the codename Operation Epic Fury), alleging that it was launched to distract from the Trump–Epstein relationship.

=== Epstein family ===
In 2024, Epstein's brother Mark said that he did not know why Epstein and Trump's friendship ended. He stated that Epstein had said in a tape that he "stopped hanging out with Donald Trump when he realized Trump was a crook". In July 2025, Mark Epstein made further statements, emphasizing their closeness, refuting Trump's assertions that he "was not a fan" and White House Communications Director Steven Cheung's statement that "The President was never in Epstein's office..." in relation to the accusation of one of Epstein's victims who mentioned having had a "disturbing" encounter with Trump in Jeffrey's office, in 1995. Mark also declared he didn't know anything about his brother's crimes until 2006.

=== Melania Trump ===
Following the release of the Epstein files, Melania Trump made a statement in early April 2026, denying any relationship with Epstein or Maxwell. Trump asserted that she had never been an Epstein victim and that she and Trump had not been introduced to one another by Epstein, but instead had first met him in 2000 at an event that she and Trump had attended together. She had appeared to referenced in an email dated October 2002, which is signed with her name however, she claims that any connections that any assertion of a relationship was a "false smear".

== In popular culture ==
On September 23, 2025, a statue of Trump and Epstein titled Best Friends Forever, also known as Why Can't We Be Friends?, was briefly installed at the National Mall in Washington, D.C. Created by an anonymous art group aliased "The Secret Handshake", the sculpture was created in protest of the relationship of Trump and Epstein and the closely associated sexual misconduct allegations against Trump. The sculpture had permits to stay on display until September 28, but was dismantled by the U.S. Park Police within 24 hours of installation. On October 2, it was reported that the statue had been temporarily reinstalled on the National Mall.

In a South Park episode titled "Sermon on the 'Mount", aired in July 2025, an animated version of Trump is asked by Satan whether he is in the "Epstein list". He answers with "The Epstein list? Are we still talking about that?" and Satan states that "It's weird that whenever it comes up you just tell everyone to relax".

A Saturday Night Live sketch aired on November 15, 2025, a few days after the release of Epstein's emails, starred James Austin Johnson as Trump and Ashley Padilla as White House press secretary Karoline Leavitt. In the show, Leavitt's character argued that Trump had not done anything illegal, saying that "If anything, his crime was loving too much, and possibly too young." The sketch also references Mark Epstein's email on Trump supposedly "blowing Bubba". It also depicts Trump saying: "Jeffrey Epstein, I barely knew the guy, OK? As evidenced by the thousands of pictures of us together, dancing and grinding our teeth at various parties." In January 2026, leading up to Epstein's birthday on January 20, and Trump's first inauguration anniversary of his second presidency, activists displayed on the National Mall a ten-foot tall (3.0 m) replica of the birthday card Trump sent to Epstein.

== See also ==
- Epstein files
  - List of people named in the Epstein files
  - Pedophile Protection Party
- Public image of Donald Trump
- Connections of Jeffrey Epstein
  - Relationship of Bill Clinton and Jeffrey Epstein
  - Relationship of Ehud Barak and Jeffrey Epstein
  - Relationship of Les Wexner and Jeffrey Epstein
  - Relationship of Peter Mandelson and Jeffrey Epstein
  - Relationship of Mette-Marit, Crown Princess of Norway, and Jeffrey Epstein
  - Relationship of Prince Andrew and Jeffrey Epstein
