= Heifer International =

Organization

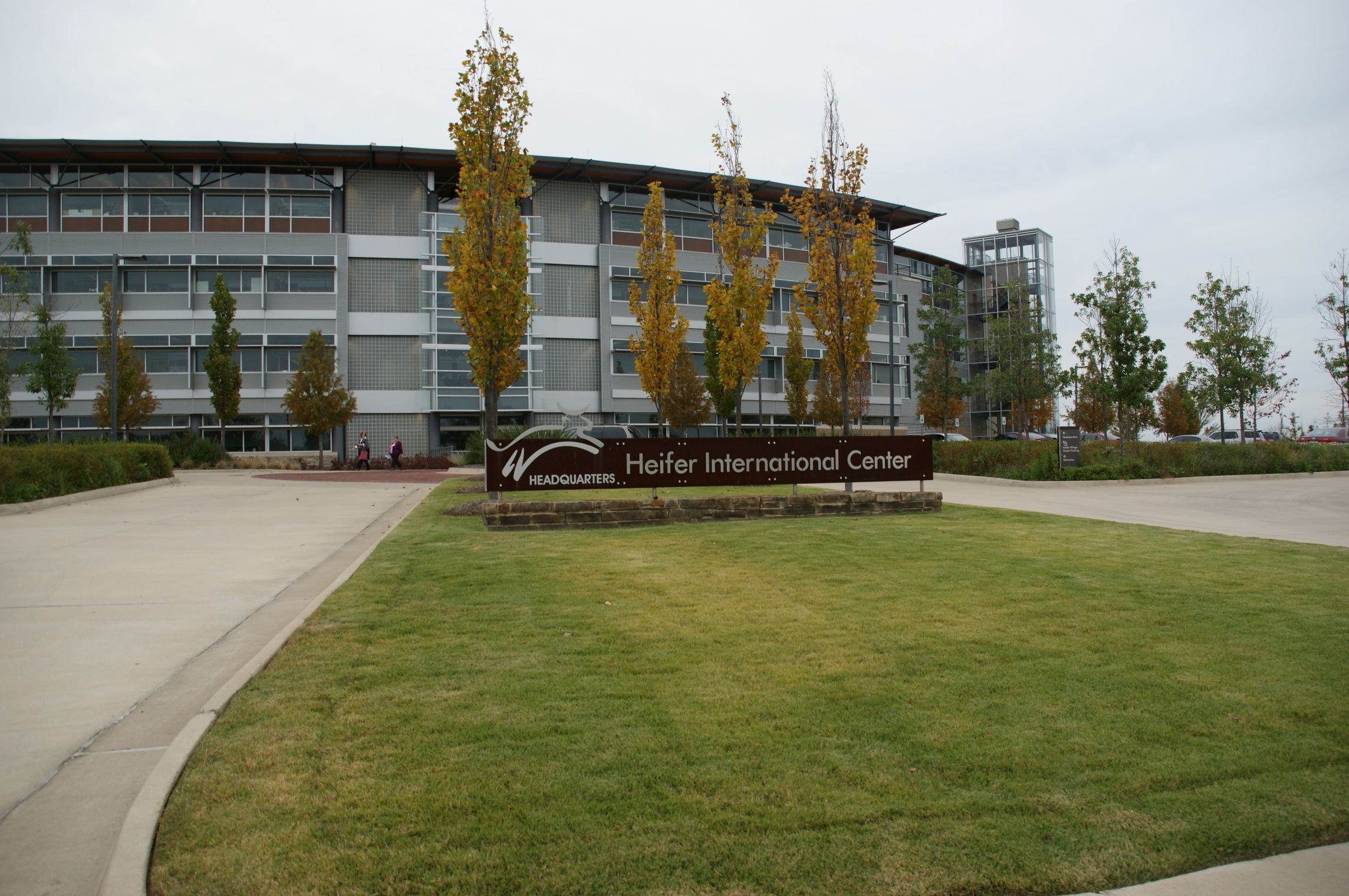
- The Heifer International headquarters in Little Rock
- Founded: 1944
- Founder: Dan West
- Type: Economic development charity
- Tax ID no.: 35-1019477
- Purpose: Agroecology, sustainable development
- Location: Little Rock, Arkansas
- Origins: Church of the Brethren; Brethren Volunteer Service; Heifers for Relief
- Region served: Global
- Key people: Surita Sandosham, President and CEO; Arlene Withers, Chairman of the Board
- Website: www.heifer.org
- Formerly called: Heifer Project International; Heifers for Relief (1944–1953)

Heifer International (also known as Heifer Project International) is a nonprofit organization based in Little Rock, Arkansas, that works to address poverty and food insecurity in developing regions by distributing livestock and providing agricultural training to families in need. Heifer International distributes animals, along with agricultural and value-based training, to families in need around the world as a means of providing self-sufficiency. Recipients must agree to "pass on the gift" by donating animal offspring, as well as sharing the skills and knowledge of animal husbandry and agricultural training with other impoverished families in the community. The organization receives financial support from the Bill & Melinda Gates Foundation, BlackRock, Cargill, Mastercard Foundation, Walmart and the W. K. Kellogg Foundation.

Based in Little Rock, Arkansas, United States, Heifer International started with a shipment of 17 heifers to Puerto Rico in 1944.

== Origins and history ==
Heifer International started as Heifers for Relief in 1944. Its founder, an Indiana farmer named Dan West, was a Church of the Brethren relief worker during the Spanish Civil War. Working with Quakers and Mennonites, West directed a program where hungry children were given rations of milk. In 1938, West was ladling out milk to hungry refugee children and wrote later that he thought, "These children don't need a cup [of milk], they need a cow."

When back home in Indiana, West took the idea to his neighbors and church. This led to the formation of the Heifers for Relief Committee in 1939. In 1942, West was approved by the U.S. Department of Agriculture to pursue the idea as a national project. The charity was incorporated in 1944 and sent its first shipment of 17 heifers to Puerto Rico. Several local farmers who knew West donated the animals.

The first cows were named "Faith," "Hope," and "Charity," and recipient families had to promise that they would donate the first female calf to another poor family. West asked farmers and church leaders to donate pregnant dairy cows due to calve soon so that impoverished families could have milk for years to come and not have to worry about breeding the cows. Heifer International would eventually broaden its scope to distribute fish, chickens, pigs, goats, sheep, cattle, oxen, water buffaloes, bees, llamas, alpacas, camels, frogs and rabbits to poor rural communities around the world.

Heifer International's first paid employee was Thurl Metzger, a member of the Church of the Brethren who started as an unpaid volunteer and was executive director/program director and director of international programs of Heifer International for 30 years. Metzger started his tenure as a seagoing cowboy. Seagoing cowboys volunteered to accompany the animals to their overseas destinations. From 1951 to 1981, Metzger was the executive director and director of international programs of the nonprofit and diversified the program's offerings as well as the geographic regions Heifer International was operating in. Eventually Metzger guided Heifer to work in developing nations instead of war-torn regions.

In the early 1970s, Heifer consolidated its U.S. distribution network by buying several large farms, including a 1,200-acre ranch in Perryville, Arkansas, as livestock holding facilities. The organization moved its headquarters to Little Rock, near the Perryville ranch, in 1971. Livestock are now sourced from within country or regionally.

In 1992, Heifer International appointed Jo Luck to its helm as CEO. Luck is a former member of Bill Clinton's Arkansas gubernatorial cabinet. Luck had been director of international programs for Heifer. Heifer's budget grew to nearly $100 million during Luck's tenure as CEO.

In 2008, the Bill & Melinda Gates Foundation awarded Heifer a $42.5 million grant to help poor rural farmers in East Africa double their incomes by increasing their production of high quality raw milk to sell to dairies. In 2012, the foundation followed up with an additional $8.2 million.

In 2010, Pierre U. Ferrari was named CEO of Heifer. Ferrari became president and CEO after Jo Luck's retirement.

In 2011, Heifer has committed to help rebuild rural communities and to improve economic opportunities through livestock inputs and management in Haiti as part of the 2011 Clinton Global Initiative (CGI) Annual Meeting.

On May 7, 2022, Mark Middleton, a former special assistant to President Bill Clinton in the 1990s, was found dead at the Heifer Ranch in Perryville, Arkansas, approximately 30 miles from his home. His death was ruled a suicide; authorities reported that he was found hanging from a tree with an extension cord around his neck and a shotgun wound to his chest.

== "Passing the Gift" ==
Heifer International's charitable model requires recipients of animals to "pass on the gift" by donating the first female offspring of their animal to another family in need. This practice is intended to create a self-sustaining chain of giving within communities.

The organization structures its programs around principles it calls the "12 Cornerstones of Just and Sustainable Development." These include community participation in decision-making, shared responsibility, gender equity, environmental sustainability, and economic self-reliance. Projects are designed with an exit strategy to encourage long-term self-sufficiency rather than continued dependency on external aid.

== External audits ==
=== Charity Navigator ===
As of 2023, Charity Navigator scored Heifer International as a 4-star (out of four) charity with 98 points out of 100. Based on the income statement for financial year 2022, Charity Navigator showed Heifer's non-program expenses (for management and fundraising) as accounting for 25.8%, and program expenses for 74.3% of its total expenses.

=== GiveWell ===
GiveWell notes that while Heifer International is "commonly perceived as a way to 'give a cow to a poor family as a gift' ... this is in fact a donor illusion – donations support Heifer International's general 'agricultural assistance' activities." GiveWell delineates concerns about the efficacy of agricultural assistance programs in general, and, specifically, those that involve gifts of livestock, stating, in conclusion: "Neither Heifer's website nor its grant application have provided the kind of information needed to address these concerns."

== Awards ==
- In 1986, President Ronald Reagan recognized Heifer with the Volunteer Action Award and in 1990 President George H.W. Bush granted the organization the Presidential End Hunger Award.
- In 2003, Heifer International was named one of Forbes magazine's top 10 charities.
- Heifer International also received the 2004 Conrad N. Hilton Humanitarian Prize for its efforts to eliminate hunger and help communities become self-sustaining. It was the first U.S.-based organization to win the $1-million award since 1997.
- Heifer International received the 2006 and 2008 Social Capitalist award from Fast Company magazine.
- In 2007, the Heifer International Headquarters building was named one of the American Institute of Architects Committee on the Environment Top Ten Green Projects.
- In 2008, the Heifer International Headquarters building was named a National AIA (American Institute of Architects) Institute Honor Award Winner.
- In 2010, Heifer International President Jo Luck was named a co-laureate of the World Food Prize with David Beckmann of Bread for the World.
- In 2011, Heifer International announced a commitment to support rural community rebuilding in Haiti as part of the Clinton Global Initiative
- In 2012, Heifer received Kiwanis International World Service Medal.
- The American Institute of Philanthropy gave Heifer International an "Open Book Credit" for making complete financial documentation available on request.
- The Better Business Bureau's Wise Giving Alliance (WGA) reports that Heifer International meets all of its standards for charity accountability. According to the WGA evaluation, Heifer met all of the organization's standards for charity accountability.

== See also ==
- Agroecology
