= Relationship of Les Wexner and Jeffrey Epstein =

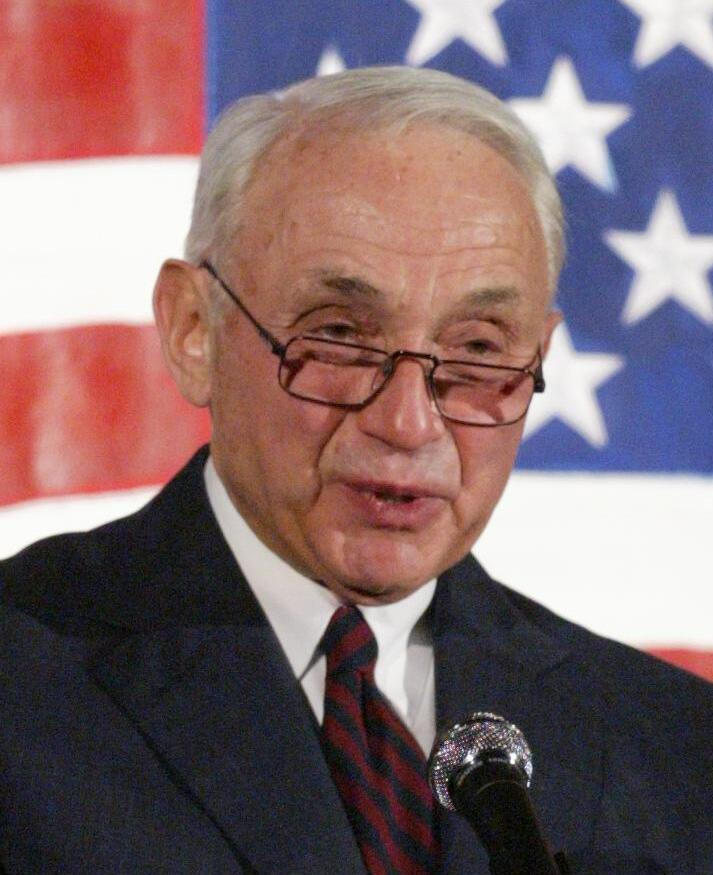
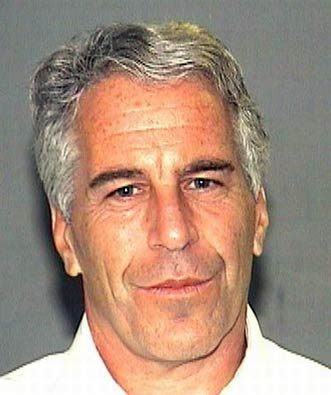
Les Wexner (left) maintained a close friendship with Jeffrey Epstein (right), remaining in close contact until 2007.

The American billionaire Les Wexner retained Jeffrey Epstein as his financial manager from 1987 to 2007 and was initially the "main client" of Epstein's money-management firm. In 2007, Wexner cut ties with Epstein, who was convicted in 2008 for soliciting a minor for prostitution in Florida, and became a registered sex offender.

In February 2026, Representative Ro Khanna revealed that the FBI had once listed Wexner as a potential Epstein co-conspirator. Wexner has denied involvement in any of Epstein's offending, and according to Epstein victim's lawyer Brad Edwards, there is no evidence to suggest Wexner was in the company of Epstein during his crimes. In April 2026, several women who were victims of Epstein would file lawsuits against Les Wexner and the Wexner Foundation which alleged Wexner helped fund Epstein's sex trafficking network with $200 million he gave to Epstein from 1987 to 2007.

== History ==
=== 1986–2008 ===
In 1986, Jeffrey Epstein met Wexner through their mutual acquaintances, insurance executive Robert Meister and his wife, in Palm Beach. Wexner hired Epstein as his financial manager from 1987 to 2007. He was the primary client of Epstein, who claimed to only work with clients with a net worth of one billion USD or greater. Wexner purchased his New York property, the Herbert N. Straus House, in 1989 and sold it to Epstein in the mid-1990s following Wexner's marriage to Abigail. Epstein moved into the house in 1995, at which time he claimed to own it, although its registered ownership changed in 2011 from a trust connected to both Wexner and Epstein to a trust controlled by Epstein. Wexner also instated Epstein as a trustee on the board of the Wexner Foundation. The power of attorney allowed Epstein to hire people, sign checks, buy and sell properties, borrow money, and do anything else of a legally binding nature on Wexner's behalf. Epstein managed Wexner's wealth and various projects such as the building of his yacht, the Limitless. In the 1990s, Wexner and Epstein were involved in relocating Southern Air Transport (a CIA front organization with ties to the Iran-Contra affair and alleged CIA drug smuggling) from Miami to Columbus. Southern Air transported goods related to Wexner's businesses, but in 1996, Customs agents found a hidden shipment of cocaine on one of the planes. Southern Air was shut down in 1998 after Wexner had received federal aid for the relocation of the airline, just weeks before the CIA Inspector General released its official findings on Contra cocaine trafficking allegations.

By 1995, Epstein was a director of the Wexner Foundation and Wexner Heritage Foundation. He was also the president of Wexner's Property, which developed part of the town of New Albany outside Columbus, Ohio, where Wexner lived. Epstein made millions in fees by managing Wexner's financial affairs. Epstein often attended Victoria's Secret fashion shows, and hosted the models at his New York City home, as well as helping aspiring models get work with the company.

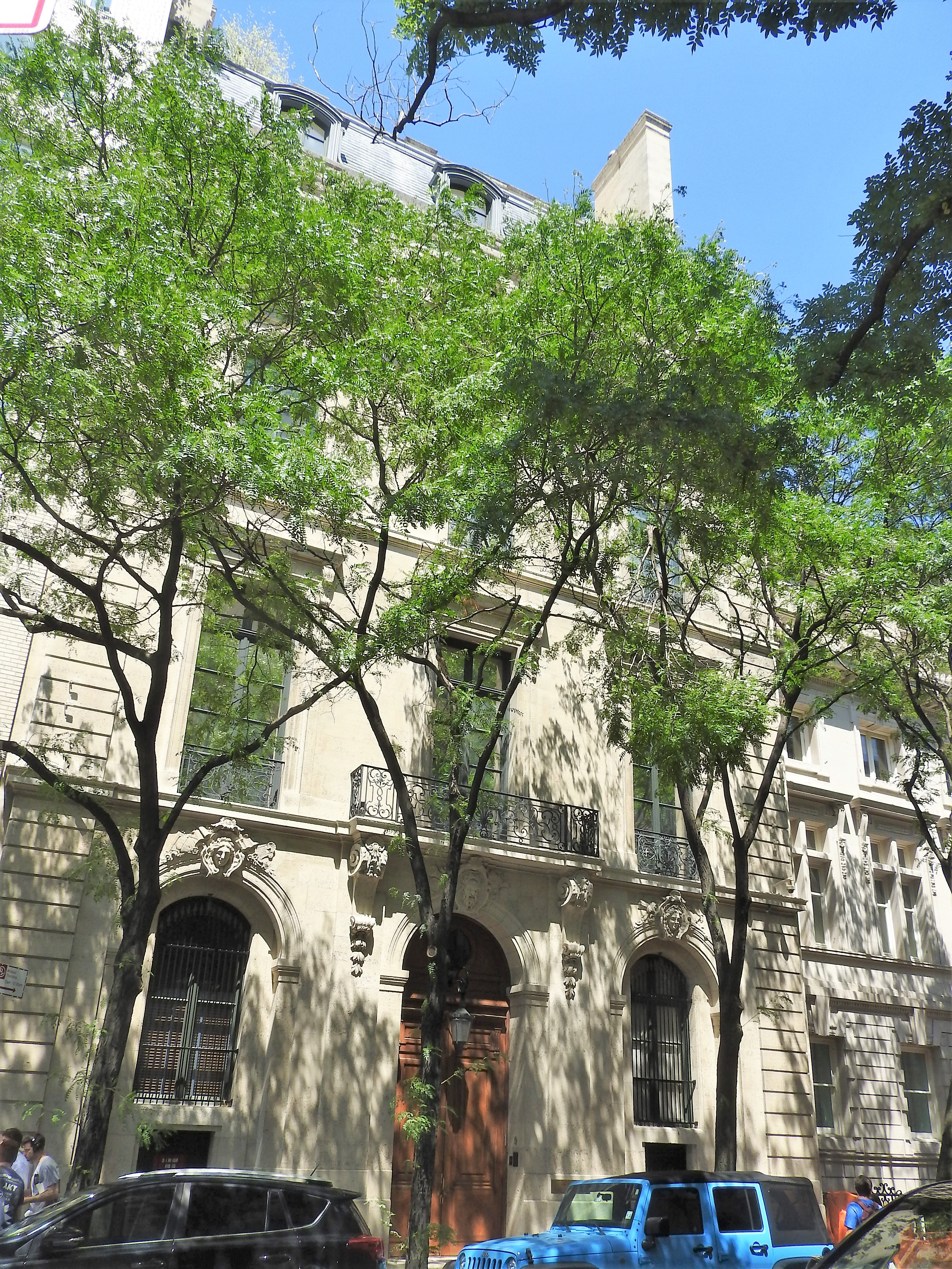
The Herbert N. Straus House on the Upper East Side

Wexner has been accused of failing to take action when complaints were raised against Epstein, after executives of L Brands reported in the mid-1990s that Epstein was abusing his power and connection to Wexner by posing as a recruiter for Victoria's Secret models. Maria Farmer contacted local and federal authorities about an assault she allegedly endured by Epstein and Ghislaine Maxwell while working as an artist-in-residence on Wexner's Ohio property in 1996. Within a year of Farmer's complaint, actress Alicia Arden filed a police report in Los Angeles detailing that Epstein had misrepresented himself as a recruiter for Victoria's Secret prior to another alleged assault. Between 1990 and 2001, Epstein's private jet the Lolita Express was owned by Wexner, who then transferred it for an undisclosed sum to Epstein.

In early 2006, Epstein was charged in Florida with "multiple counts of molestation and unlawful sexual activity with a minor." The New York Times reported that 18 months after the charges were filed, Wexner cut his ties with Epstein. In emails from Epstein's account obtained by Distributed Denial of Secrets, Wexner messaged Epstein prior to Epstein's guilty plea in 2008 writing, "All I can say is I feel sorry. You violated your own number 1 rule ... Always be careful." Wexner claimed to have severed ties with Epstein in 2007. These emails were not released by the DOJ. In an unsent draft letter that was released by the DOJ, Epstein wrote to Wexner, "You and I had 'gang stuff' for over 15 years" and then refers to secrets the two of them kept from Wexner's wife.

=== 2019–2021 ===
In July 2019, Wexner was included on a list of Epstein's "10 co-conspirators" within an FBI email, alongside Ghislaine Maxwell, Darren Indyke, Richard Kahn, Jean-Luc Brunel, and Leslie Groff, though Wexner continued to deny involvement. In August 2019, following Epstein's second incarceration and prior to his death, Wexner addressed the Wexner Foundation, releasing a written statement that his former financial advisor, Epstein, had "misappropriated vast sums of money" from him and from his family. Wexner retained the services of Debevoise & Plimpton criminal defense attorney and former U.S. Attorney for the Southern District of New York Mary Jo White. Weeks after Epstein's death, JPMorgan Chase filed a suspicious activity report for transactions conducted by Wexner as well as Glenn Dubin, Leon Black, and Alan Dershowitz, totalling about $1 billion. These reports were unsealed by a federal judge.

L Brands shareholders filed a complaint in the Court of Chancery of Delaware on January 14, 2021, stating that Wexner, among others, created an "entrenched culture of misogyny, bullying, and harassment," and was aware of abuses being committed by Epstein, which breached Wexner's fiduciary duty to the company and devalued the brand. The complaint also names Wexner's wife, current chair Sarah E. Nash, and former marketing officer Ed Razek, whose "widely known misconduct" was allegedly allowed at the company. On July 30, 2021, L Brands agreed to a $90 million settlement to resolve derivative lawsuits stemming from claims that combine Ohio and Delaware actions.

=== 2026 ===
Following the passage of the 2025 Epstein Files Transparency Act, Wexner faced additional public scrutiny. In January 2026, Wexner was subpoenaed by the US House Oversight Committee of Congress to sit for a deposition.

In February 2026, Representative Ro Khanna revealed that the FBI had once listed Wexner as a potential Epstein co-conspirator. Wexner has denied involvement in any of Epstein's offending, and according to Epstein victim's lawyer Brad Edwards, there is no evidence to suggest Wexner was in the company of Epstein during his crimes.

In April 2026, both Wexner and the Wexner Foundation would be sued by some victims of Epstein.

== See also ==
- List of people named in the Epstein files
- Relationship of Donald Trump and Jeffrey Epstein
- Relationship of Bill Clinton and Jeffrey Epstein
- Relationship of Prince Andrew and Jeffrey Epstein
- Relationship of Peter Mandelson and Jeffrey Epstein
- Relationship of Mette-Marit, Crown Princess of Norway, and Jeffrey Epstein
