= Dan West (philanthropist) =

Dan West (1893–1971) was the founder of the aid program Heifer International, dedicated to relieving hunger and poverty by supplying farmers with livestock. He was a social activist involved in other programs associated with the Church of the Brethren. He was an advocate for Christian pacifism and a conscientious objector in World War One.

== Biography ==
Born in Preble County, Ohio on December 31m, 1893, West was a member of the Church of the Brethren, known as one of the Historic Peace Churches. He attended Bethany Bible Schoolm graduated from Manchester University (Indiana) in 1917. He married Lucille Sherk in 1932. They had five children, including Phillip West, an historian of China, and Jan (West) Schrock.

As a church man from Indiana, West spent two years as a conscientious objector during World War I. After working for the Emergency Peace Campaign in 1936, he traveled to Spain to serve as the director of a relief program in the Spanish Civil War. He grew weary of handing out rationed supplies and thought there had to be a better way of eliminating hunger. He gave the idea to his neighbors and many congregations in northern Indiana of donating young heifers to families in need. The involvement from his community led him to bigger dreams. His idea became an official program of the Church of the Brethren in 1942 and eventually became an independent nonprofit corporation in 1953. His phrase "not a cup of milk, but a cow" became the mantra for Heifer International, which continues on today.

With deep-rooted Christian values and a conviction for active peacemaking, he led by example, and motivated others to believe that ordinary people could do extraordinary things.

— Manchester College

Upon returning to the United States, West pushed for two more programs to be created. Alongside Alma Long, he was a key person in helping to develop the Brethren Volunteer Service (BVS) in 1948. The BVS acted as an alternative to military service for war objectors beginning in World War II. At Manchester University, West spoke to the president of the university and, together, they convinced Gladdys Muir to launch the nation's first undergraduate program in peace studies at Manchester University.
