= Mark Middleton (businessman) =

American businessman and public official (1962–2022)

- Born: Mark Middleton; October 12, 1962; Little Rock, Arkansas, US
- Died: May 7, 2022 (aged 59); Perryville, Arkansas, US
- Education: University of Arkansas
- Occupations: Lawyer; businessman

Mark Middleton (October 12, 1962 – May 7, 2022) was an American businessman and lawyer who served as a special assistant to President Bill Clinton in the White House during the 1990s. He facilitated visits by Jeffrey Epstein to the White House and flew with Epstein during this time. He died in 2022 in an alleged suicide. He was found hanging by an electrical cord and had a shotgun wound to his chest.

== Early life ==
Middleton was born in 1962 and raised in Arkansas. He studied law at the University of Arkansas and later worked as a lawyer in Little Rock, Arkansas. With his family, he helped to build the air conditioning company Middleton Heat & Air.

== Work for Bill Clinton ==
In Little Rock, he met the then-governor of Arkansas, Bill Clinton. He became involved in Bill Clinton's political career during Clinton's 1992 campaign for the presidency, playing a key role in fundraising efforts, helping to raise $4 million for Clinton's campaign.

During the first Clinton administration, Middleton served as a special assistant to the President and as an aide to Chief of Staff Mack McLarty. His main task at the White House was to maintain contact with Clinton's various donors.

Middleton was implicated in the Chinagate controversy. Middleton had contact to Charlie Trie, John Huang and the Indonesian Riady family, playing a key role in the affair. He was called to testify before the House Committee on Government Reform in 1999 but invoked his Fifth Amendment rights, refusing to answer questions to avoid self-incrimination.

== Post-White House activities ==
After leaving the White House in February 1995, Middleton returned to Arkansas, where he became the president of MidCorp Capital, a business venture, and became again involved in his family's air conditioning company, Middleton Heat & Air. He also served on the boards of several nonprofit organizations, including the UAMS Foundation Fund and the CHI St. Vincent Foundation.

Middleton remained active in charitable activities, chairing events such as the Arkansas Children's Hospital's Miracle Ball in 2019, which raised $1 million for the hospital.

== Death ==
On May 7, 2022, Middleton was found dead at the Heifer Ranch in Perryville, Arkansas, approximately 30 miles from his home. His death was ruled a suicide; authorities reported that he was found hanging from a tree with an extension cord around his neck and a shotgun wound to his chest. The circumstances of his death prompted public speculation.

Following his death, Middleton's family sought to block the release of photographs and other media related to the death scene to protect their privacy and to prevent the spread of "conspiracy theories". In June 2022, a judge sealed photos, videos, and other visual evidence in the investigation of his death, with the stated objective of protecting the privacy of Middleton's family.
