= Matan Uziel =

Israeli activist

- מתן עוזיאל
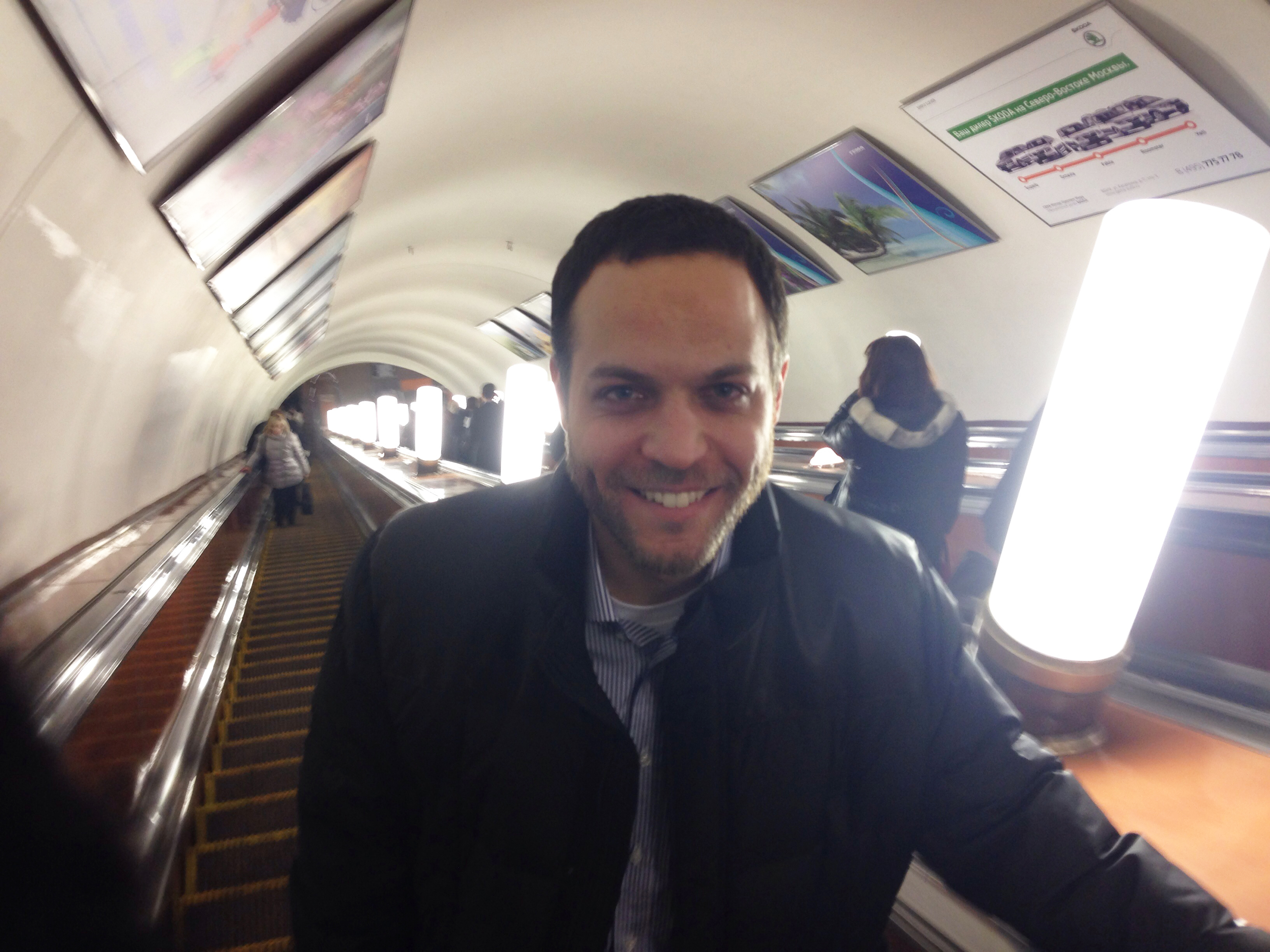
- Uziel in 2014
- Born: 21 April 1985 (age 41); Beersheba, Israel
- Occupations: High-tech entrepreneur, executive producer, founder of Real Women Real Stories

Matan Uziel (Hebrew: מתן עוזיאל; born April 21, 1985) is an Israeli former high-tech entrepreneur and documentary filmmaker and executive producer. He is also the founder of the Real Women Real Stories channel on YouTube. Uziel is a former modeling agent and scout who represented Israeli supermodel Maayan Keret. He is also the former board member of the National Eating Disorders Association.

== Discovery of Elsagate videos (2017–present) ==
=== November 2017 ===
On 22 November, BuzzFeed News published an article about unsettling videos on YouTube that depict children in disturbing and abusive situations. The information on the article came with the assistance of Matan Uziel whose investigation and report to the Federal Bureau of Investigation on that matter were sent on 22 September, informing its leadership about "tens of thousands of videos available on YouTube that we know are crafted to serve as eye candy for perverted, creepy adults, online predators to indulge in their child fantasies." On 27 November, YouTube announced in a statement to BuzzFeed News that it had "terminated more than 270 accounts and removed over 150,000 videos", "turned off comments on more than 625,000 videos targeted by child predators" and "removed ads from nearly 2 million videos and over 50,000 channels masquerading as family-friendly content".

Uziel is a vocal proponent against the censorship of YouTube and gave numerous interviews about YouTube's removal of content that "might be sensitive, but serves a public good."

== Roman Polanski libel case ==
In December 2017, Roman Polanski filed a ₪1.5 million suit in Herzliya Magistrates' Court against Matan Uziel. Polanski maintained that Uziel, through his website, www.imetpolanski.com, falsely reported that five women had come forward to accuse him of raping them. Polanski was suing for libel and defamation of character. Herzliya Magistrates' Court rejected Polanski's request to be exempt from appearing in court after filing the libel suit.

While Polanski gave various reasons for his inability to appear, the presiding judge, Gilad Hess, dismissed these one by one and ordered Polanski to pay Uziel ₪10,000 in costs. In November 2018, it was published that Polanski decided to drop the lawsuit, and was ordered by the court to pay Uziel ₪30,000 (US$8,000) for court costs. The court accepted Uziel's request that the suit not be dropped, but rather that it be rejected, making Polanski unable to sue Uziel again over the same issue in the future.

In late December 2019, in Polanski's interviews with Paris Match and Gazeta Wyborcza, Polanski accused Uziel of carefully orchestrating the attacks on his character and for playing a major role in designing an international campaign to besmirch his name and reputation in order to make his career fall from grace.

In October 2021, it was reported that Uziel was the originating force behind helping Charlotte Lewis to sue and indict Roman Polanski.

In November 2022, Polanski filed a cybersquatting dispute with World Intellectual Property Organization in Geneva against the domain name imetpolanski.com operated by Uziel. In February 2023, the three-person panel ruled that Polanski didn’t show the domain was registered and used in bad faith, nor did he show that the registrant, Uziel, lacked rights or legitimate interests in the domain name.

== Assistance in hunting down Jean-Luc Brunel ==
Although Jean-Luc Brunel's whereabouts remained secret and it had been believed by the public that Brunel had already managed to flee France, Brunel's victims including Zoë Brock and Thysia Huisman succeeded in hunting him down in France at the assistance of Uziel and his skills, by using GNSS, mobile phone tracking, Technical intelligence, HUMINT and other clues as late as July 2020. Uziel forwarded the intelligence to the FBI and French authorities who arrested Brunel five months later on his way to flee.

Brunel was a close associate of Jeffrey Epstein and operated as a key talent scout for him. He founded MC2 Model Management with financing from Epstein and was accused of grooming young, aspiring models for a sex trafficking ring, acting as a procurer for Epstein for over three decades.

== Jeffrey Epstein sex trafficking scandal ==
Back in September 2017, Matan Uziel tracked down Chauntae Davies, a survivor of Jeffrey Epstein, who went on trip to Africa with former President Bill Clinton. In December 2018, Uziel helped Davies come forward with her story by connecting her with the Miami Herald's journalist Julie K. Brown, who had written a story about her, and who later identified 80 victims and located about 60 of them.

== Real Women Real Stories ==
Founded by Uziel on 8 March 2016, Real Women Real Stories is an international collection of filmed testimonies of women around the world, who submit, share, and discuss different contents and topics. Through these documentaries, Uziel's Real Women Real Stories intends to bring viewers face-to-face with different subjects and enable women raise their voice on what they feel needs attention. Since its launch, the project has been featured internationally to great acclaim.

== Kate del Castillo and former drug lord El Chapo ==
On January 9, 2012, del Castillo publicly posted an essay on Twitter (using Twextra) discussing social issues in Mexico that included controversial statements directed towards Joaquín "El Chapo" Guzmán, the infamous head of the Sinaloa Cartel. What later became a scandal and a Netflix documentary was first told by Castillo herself on Uziel's platform Real Women Real Stories during March 2017.

== Activism ==
Matan Uziel previously served as a board member of the National Eating Disorders Association. During his tenure, he created a Change.org petition against Spreadshirt, accusing the e-commerce company for selling shirts that appeared to glamorize eating disorders.

In August 2017, Uziel started a petition calling for convicted child rapist and former priest Paul Shanley to live in a treatment facility where he will have no access to children. As of 5 August 2017, more than 15,000 people had signed the petition, which also called for Shanley's whereabouts to be monitored with a GPS bracelet.

More than a decade ago, a video appeared on the web in which Mexican actress Michelle Vieth appeared naked, a situation that she still considers heartbreaking and difficult to overcome. In July 2017, Vieth contacted Uziel, who helped her to remove the content from the internet.

On 16 February 2018, Katinka Hosszú, a Hungarian three-time Olympic champion and a nine-time long-course world champion, filed for divorce from Shane Tusup. On 25 May 2018, Hosszú's Facebook page was deleted by Tusup, who was the sole administrator of the page. However, on 6 June 2018, Hosszú regained access to her Facebook and then Instagram page with the assistance of Uziel.

In August 2019, Uziel and his organization Real Women Real Stories discovered that shirts bearing iconic photographs of the Holocaust of a man being shot to death while perched over a mass grave are sold on Amazon UK. The items in question featured an infamous photograph known as The Last Jew in Vinnitsa. Uziel forwarded the information to Israel's Channel 2 and following the channel's inquiry, Amazon has removed the items.

== Personal life ==
Uziel is known for traveling to Bir al-Abed and Al-Rawda on November 2017, during the Sinai insurgency, which was closed to Westerns without Egyptian permission, to meet al-Sawarka tribesmen whose leaders helped reduce jihadist attacks, the first time an Israeli met with the Bedouin tribe during the insurgency.

Matan Uziel is the grandson of Moshe Gueron and great-grandson of Ben-Zion Meir Hai Uziel.
