= Daniel Siad =

Swedish modeling scout (1957–2026)

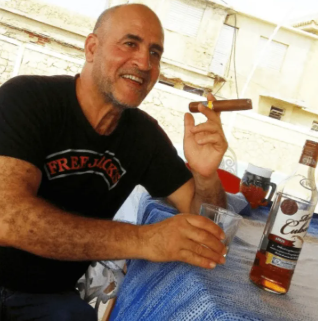
- Born: Daniel Amar Siad; October 28, 1957; French Algeria
- Died: July 21, 2026 (aged 68); Hauts-de-Seine, France
- Other names: Amar Siad; Siad Amar
- Citizenship: Sweden; France; Algeria
- Occupation: Model scout
- Known for: Association with Jeffrey Epstein

Daniel Amar Siad (Arabic: دانيال عمار سياد; 28 October 1957 – 20 July 2026) was a Swedish modeling scout. He worked for the "What's Up Management" modeling agency and for MC2 Model Management.

Siad also worked as a fashion photographer, project manager for a Russian fashion television channel, and financial consultant, with residences in Stockholm and ties to Paris and Barcelona. A known associate of Jeffrey Epstein, Siad was publicly accused of rape and sex trafficking by at least five women, and was also linked (along with Epstein) to a German model who went missing in 2015.

== Early life ==
Daniel Amar Siad was born in Algeria on 28 October 1957. In 1980, he immigrated to Sweden. He described himself as being of Algerian and Berber Jewish heritage, and often framed his personal trajectory through that heritage.

Little public information exists regarding Siad's background beyond associations with fashion and modeling, including roles as a project manager at World Fashion Channel and consultant activities. Siad had ties to Stockholm, Sweden, where he had resided, as well as to Paris and Barcelona.

== Connection to Epstein and Brunel ==
Siad was described in court documents and media reports as a key Jeffrey Epstein associate who operated primarily in Europe, forwarding profiles, photographs, and sometimes videos of potential models and others to Epstein, often via email. He was mentioned in the files around 2000 times and his activities spanned the late 2000s to at least 2017 and included scouting in Poland, the Czech Republic, Slovakia, Hungary, Bulgaria, Latvia, South Africa (particularly Cape Town), Barcelona, Ibiza, Paris, Morocco, Cuba, and elsewhere.

Siad's name gained attention in February 2026 following a release of Epstein files, which included repeated mentions of his scouting role across multiple countries. Media coverage highlighted potential exploitation concerns in Poland, prompting Prime Minister Donald Tusk to announce the establishment of an investigative body. Siad was identified in declassified United States Department of Justice documents as a scout and recruiter of young women and girls for Epstein's network, particularly in the period after Epstein’s 2008 conviction as a sex offender.

Siad also recruited models for Epstein associate Jean-Luc Brunel, a French modeling agent who died in prison in 2022 while facing charges related to rape and trafficking of minors connected to Epstein. In a U. S. Department of Justice file, Brunel described Siad as a "scout or recruiter of girls and/or women for J. Epstein". Siad worked directly as a modelling scout on commission for MC2 Model Management. He exchanged emails and communications with Brunel and forwarded modeling profiles and travel arrangements involving young women to Epstein. An unverified photograph purportedly showing Siad with Woody Allen circulated online amid the file releases.

In a 2009 email, Siad informed convicted sex offender Jeffrey Epstein of plans to scout in small villages across Poland, the Czech Republic, Slovakia, and Hungary during June and July. He contacted modeling agencies in Sofia, Bulgaria, in 2010, including Next One Agency, and sent photos of candidates to Epstein while organizing meetings. In South Africa, Siad sent pictures of young women and girls from Cape Town, describing the "potential of girls" as "huge," with Epstein critiquing their appearance in responses.

In 2015, Siad met a 16-year-old New Zealand model and her friend in Paris and forwarded their modeling profiles to Epstein, who deemed them "too old." In Barcelona, where Siad settled around 2016–2017, he contacted modeling agencies, housed young models in his small apartment, and sent photos and details to Epstein, including comments on ages and appearances (e.g., noting one 20-year-old "seems minor"). He organized travel, provided financial assistance to some women, and received payments via a Dubai bank account. Siad also scouted in other locations, such as Cuba post-2016 and Morocco, and forwarded profiles for events like Formula 1 hostessing.

At least five women publicly accused Siad personally of rape and sex trafficking, which he denied. On February 10, 2026, former Swedish model Ebba P. Karlsson accused Siad of raping her in the swimming pool of a villa in Cannes, France in 1990. Karlsson filed a complaint with the Paris prosecutor's office for rape and trafficking against Siad. In June 2026, an investigation from ZDF and Der Spiegel revealed that a German model missing since 2015, referred to as "Michele", had contact with Siad and was presented to Epstein.

The Paris prosecutor's office launched a broad investigation into charges of human trafficking in connection with Jeffrey Epstein on February 18, 2026. Siad was under investigation in France for allegations of rape and human trafficking and had not yet been questioned by investigators. Said was under telephone surveillance by the Paris prosecutor's office but they said there was not "enough evidence justifying his immediate arrest." Siad told French and British media that he believed Epstein was a professional person and was a casting director for Victoria's Secret and MC2 Model Management. At the time of his death, Siad had not been criminally charged or arrested in connection with Epstein's crimes.

== Activism ==
From 2017 to 2020, he was appointed the diplomatic representative of the Movement for the Self-Determination of Kabylia (MAK) in Saudi Arabia, the United Arab Emirates, and Bahrain. He left the movement after being mentioned in the Epstein files. He is also mentioned as a speaker at a CMA conference in 2018, and presented on that occasion as a diplomat and activist committed to Amazigh culture, language, and identity.

== Death ==
On 20 July 2026, Siad was found dead at his home in Colombes, France. Although Siad's lawyer stated that he had died of a heart attack, his cause of death has not yet been determined.

== See also ==
- Epstein files
- List of people named in the Epstein files
