= Death of Jeffrey Epstein =

2019 death in custody in New York, US

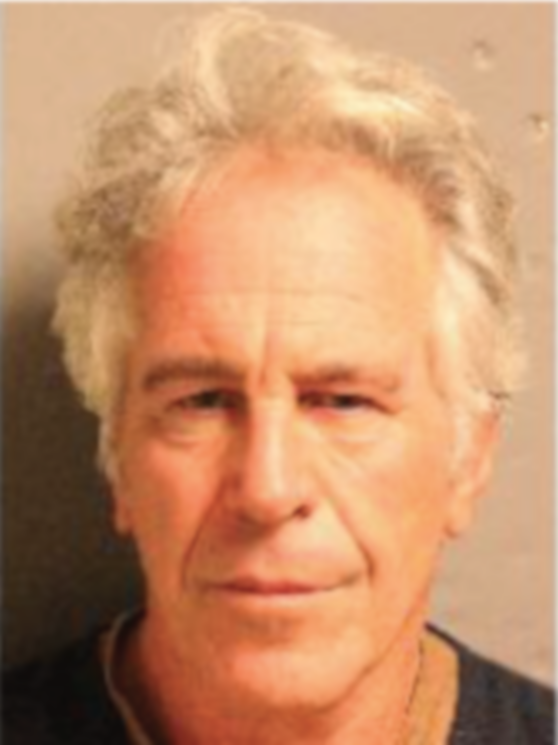
- Epstein in his final mugshot, July 8, 2019 (age 66)
- Date: August 10, 2019; 7 years ago
- Location: Metropolitan Correctional Center, New York, U.S.
- Outcome: Removal of warden, indictments of guards on duty
- Inquiries: FBI and DOJ investigations
- Coroner: New York City Medical Examiner
- Arrests: Michael Thomas and Tova Noel
- Charges: Conspiracy (1 count each); Record falsification (Noel 5 counts; Thomas 3 counts)
- Sentence: Thomas and Noel: 100 hours of community service

On August 10, 2019, Jeffrey Epstein, an American financier and a child sex offender, was found unresponsive in his jail cell at 6:30 a.m, at the Metropolitan Correctional Center in New York City, hanging off the side of his cell's bed, where he was awaiting trial on sex trafficking charges. After prison guards reportedly performed CPR, he was transported in cardiac arrest to the New York Downtown Hospital, where he was pronounced dead at 6:39 am. The New York City medical examiner and the Justice Department Inspector General ruled that Epstein's death was caused by suicide by means of hanging. Epstein's lawyers challenged the medical examiner's conclusion and opened their own investigation, hiring pathologist Michael Baden.

After initially expressing suspicion, Attorney General William Barr described Epstein's death as "a perfect storm of screw-ups". Both the Federal Bureau of Investigation (FBI) and the Department of Justice's Inspector General conducted investigations into the circumstances of his death. The guards on duty were later charged with multiple counts of record falsification. Many public figures accused the Federal Bureau of Prisons (FBOP) of negligence; several lawmakers called for reforms to the federal prison system. In response, Barr removed the director of the FBOP.

As a result of Epstein's death, all charges against him were dismissed, and ongoing sex-trafficking investigations shifted attention to his alleged associates, notably Ghislaine Maxwell, who was arrested and indicted in July 2020 and convicted on five sex trafficking-related counts on December 29, 2021. Another associate, Jean-Luc Brunel, was arrested by French authorities in 2020 and later died by suicide.

Due to jail procedures on the night of Epstein's death, and his proximity to high-profile figures, his death generated speculation and conspiracy theories about the possibility that he was murdered. Other theories claimed his death was staged. In November 2019, the contested nature of his death spawned the "Epstein didn't kill himself" meme. Public opinion polls suggest that only a minority of Americans believe that Epstein died by suicide; one such poll saw 16% of respondents saying they believed Epstein died by suicide, 45% believing he was murdered, and 39% being unsure.

== Arrest and imprisonment ==
=== Apprehension and indictment ===
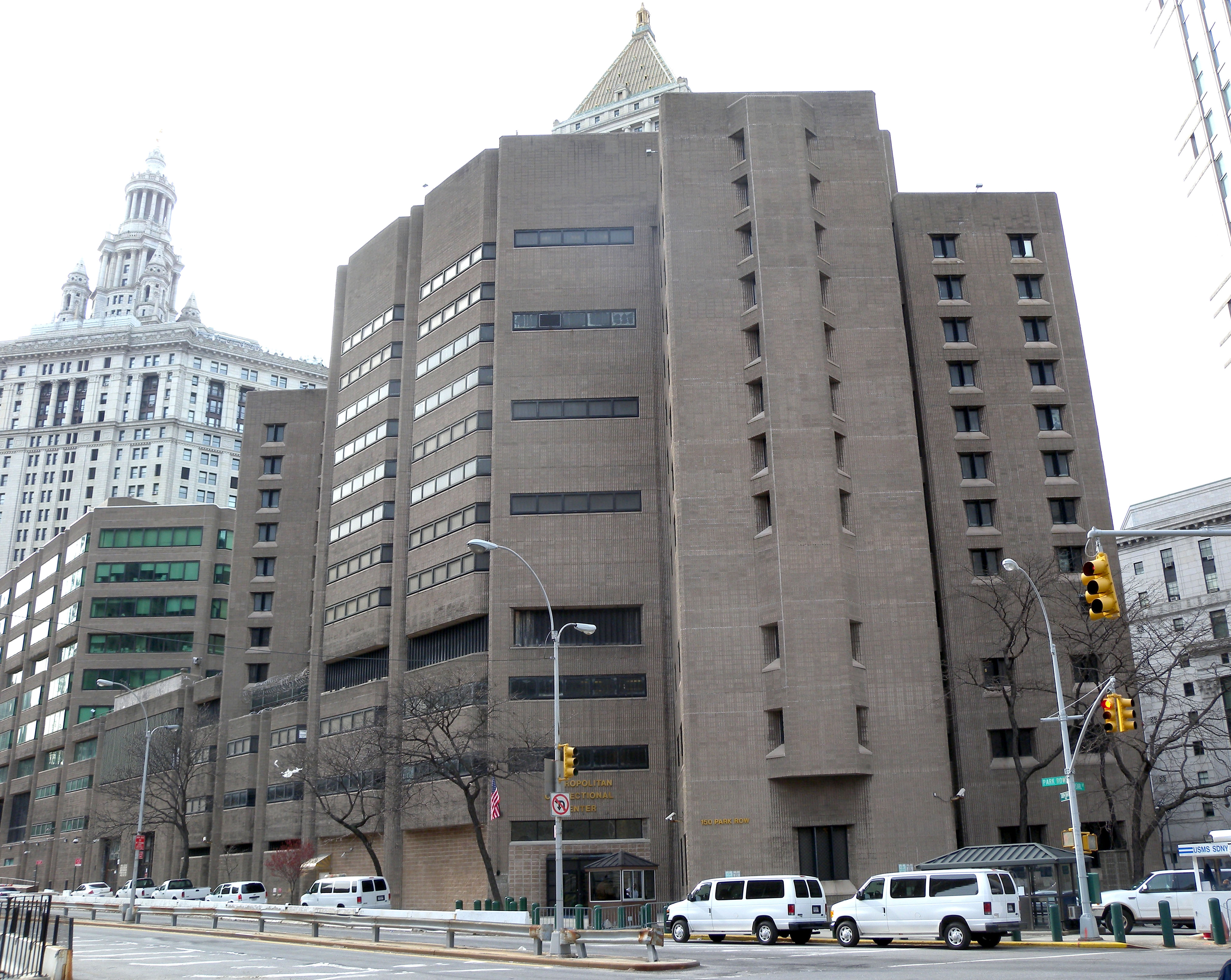
The Metropolitan Correctional Center, where Epstein was held after his 2019 arrest

On July 6, 2019, Jeffrey Epstein was arrested in New York City on multiple charges, including sex trafficking, and held at the Metropolitan Correctional Center (Note: Within the MCC, Epstein was placed in the Special Housing Unit to protect him from violence by inmates in the general population.) in Lower Manhattan. He pleaded not guilty. He faced similar charges in Florida in 2008, but accepted a plea bargain in exchange for immunity from federal charges. Under its provisions, he pleaded guilty to two state felony charges, paid restitution to three dozen victims identified by the FBI, and registered as a sex offender in both Florida and New York.

On July 18, 2019, Epstein was denied bail after offering $600,000 to be able to wear an ankle tracker at his New York City townhouse. He was viewed as a potential flight risk because of the 20 international flights he had taken in the previous 18 months. Epstein appealed the bail denial decision to the United States Court of Appeals for the Second Circuit; at the time of his death, the appeal was still pending.

=== Initial incident and final weeks ===
At 1:27 a.m. on July 23, 2019, Epstein was found semiconscious in his cell with injuries to his neck. Prison officials questioned his cellmate, multiple murder and drug conspiracy suspect Nicholas Tartaglione. He denied harming Epstein. An internal prison investigation cleared Tartaglione of any connection to the event. One unnamed source claimed Epstein told his lawyers Tartaglione had inflicted the injuries on him. Another unnamed source claimed Epstein staged the incident in order to be transferred. Spencer Kuvin, a lawyer who represented three of Epstein's alleged victims, said in July 2019, after Epstein's first apparent suicide attempt, that he believed it was an attack on his life, and that there was a high probability that he would be murdered in prison.

CCTV footage released in July 2025 showing part of a common area within the Metropolitan Correctional Center where Epstein was being held. A minute is missing from the footage, where the clock jumps from 11:58:58 to 12:00:00. This was explained as a re-construction of footage, though this is unverified.

As a result of the incident, Epstein was placed on suicide watch. He was held in an observation cell surrounded by windows, where lights were left on and any devices that he could use to kill himself were not permitted. After six days, psychological staff removed Epstein from suicide watch following a psychiatric examination. He then returned to the Security Housing Unit (SHU), where he was to have a cellmate and be checked on every 30 minutes.

During his final days in his cell, Epstein allegedly wrote two notes. One said investigators had "FOUND NOTHING!!!" and that "It is a treat to be able to choose one's time to say goodbye"; a court made the note public in 2026. The other, released by 60 Minutes in 2020, included a complaint about large bugs crawling on his body, guard Tova Noel giving him burnt food, and a guard intentionally locking him in a shower cell without clothes for an hour. (Note: This letter was written in ballpoint pen. The pathologist hired by the Epstein family, Michael Baden, has suggested that Epstein would not have been allowed to have a ballpoint pen if prison staff had considered him suicidal.) Both notes contained the phrase "NO FUN" in all caps and underlined.

On August 8, Epstein signed his last will and testament, witnessed by two attorneys who knew him. The will named two longtime employees as executors, and immediately gifted all his assets, and any assets remaining in his estate, to a trust. According to the New York Times, Epstein's estate was valued at around $600 million at the time of his death.

== Death ==
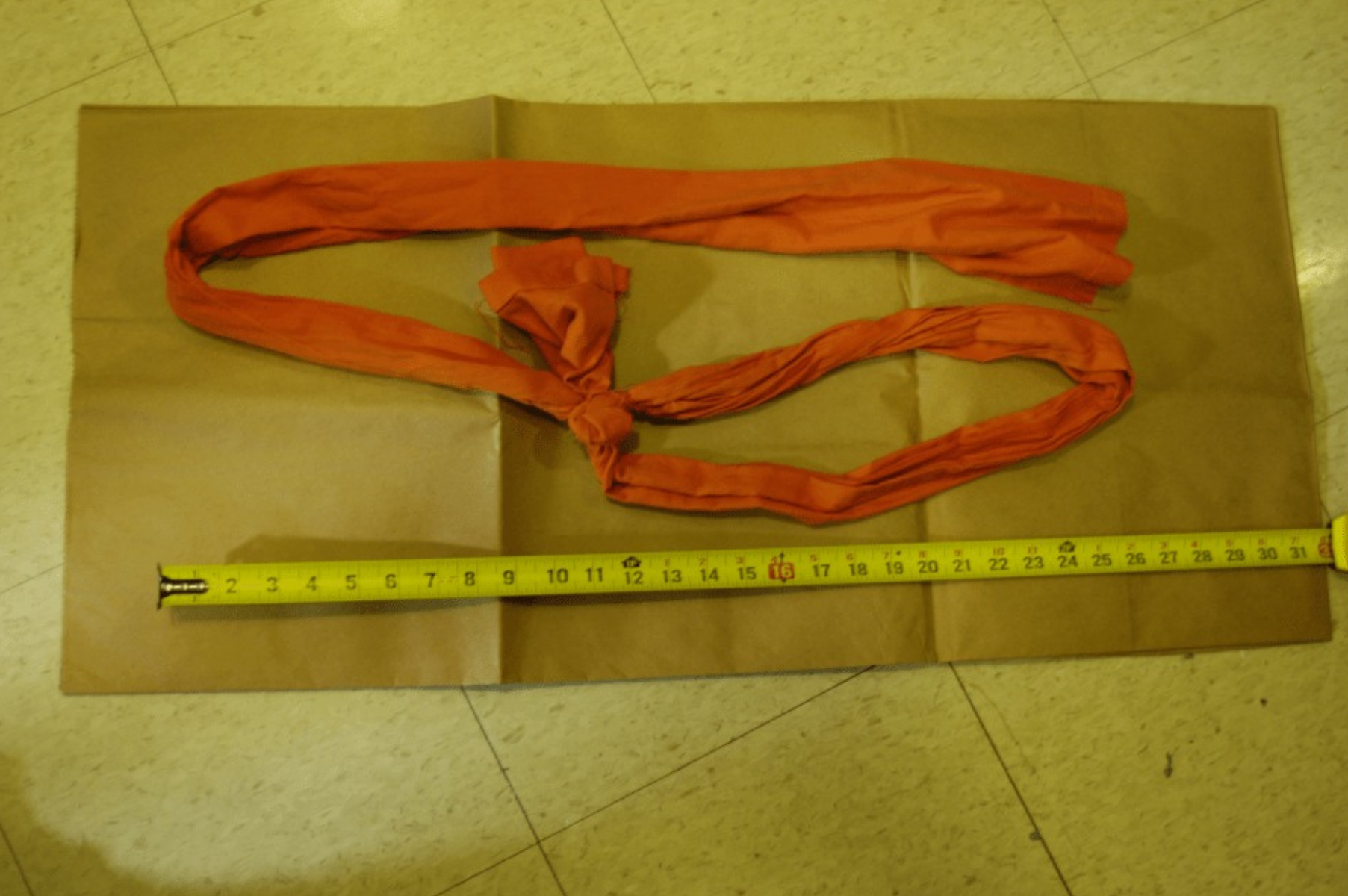
The noose Jeffrey Epstein allegedly used to hang himself.

When Epstein was placed in the Security Housing Unit (SHU), the jail informed the Justice Department that he would have a cellmate and that a guard would look into the cell every 30 minutes. These procedures were not followed on the night he died. On August 9, Epstein's cellmate was transferred, and no replacement was brought in. The evening of his death, Epstein met with his lawyers, who described him as "upbeat" before being escorted back to the SHU at 7:49 p.m. by guard Tova Noel. CCTV footage shows that the two guards failed to perform the required institutional count at 10:00 p.m. and recorded Noel briefly walking by Epstein's cell at 10:30 p.m., the last time the guards entered the tier where his cell was located. Through the night, in violation of the jail's normal procedure, Epstein was not checked every 30 minutes. The two guards assigned to check his cell overnight, Noel and Michael Thomas, fell asleep at their desk (Note: Their desk was about 15 feet (ca. 4.6 meters) away from Epstein's cell, but up a flight of stairs and through a locked gate.) for about three hours and later falsified related records. Two cameras in front of Epstein's cell malfunctioned that night. Another camera had footage that was "unusable".

=== Discovery ===
Epstein's body being moved to the medical examiner's office

On the morning of August 10, Noel typed "latest on Epstein in jail" into a search engine at 5:42 a.m. and 5:52 a.m. As the guards were distributing breakfast shortly after 6:30 a.m., Epstein was found unresponsive in cardiac arrest in his cell. He was found in a kneeling position with a strip of bedsheet (Note: Epstein's possession of a bedsheet would have been against jail protocol when he was under suicide watch, but at the time of his death he was only under supervision and therefore allowed it.) wrapped around his neck. The sheet was tied to the top of his bunk. The guards performed CPR on Epstein, and other prisoners heard them yell "Breathe, Epstein, breathe." At 6:33 a.m., the guards pulled an alarm, notifying their supervisor, to whom Noel said, "Epstein hung [sic] himself." He was rushed to the New York Downtown Hospital where he was pronounced dead at 6:39 a.m. His body was transported to the medical examiner's office soon after. The forensic pathologist hired by Epstein's family said he had likely died two hours before guards found him.

The removal of Epstein's body from his cell was a violation of protocol, as the Bureau of Prisons (BOP) mandates that a suicide scene be treated with the "same level of protection as any crime scene in which a death has occurred". Consequently, prison personnel also failed to photograph Epstein's body as it was found.

=== Controversy ===
Epstein's death was the first death ruled a suicide at the MCC in 21 years. Michael Baden and 60 Minutes questioned whether Epstein, who was almost 6 ft (1.83 m) tall and weighed 185 pounds (84 kg), could have been able to hang himself from the lower bunk. Photos taken after the death also show bottles and medicine standing upright on the top bunk. Baden also questioned why Epstein did not use other materials available in his cell as a ligature, such as wires and tubing from a sleep apnea machine, which were stronger and longer.

=== Possible motivations ===
A psychological reconstruction report of Epstein's death compiled by Bureau of Prisons five weeks after his death suggests that Epstein's identity "appeared to be based on his wealth, power and association with other high-profile individuals." The report further attributes his suicide to lack of significant interpersonal connections, loss of status, and the idea of potentially spending the rest of his life in prison.

== Autopsy and forensic evidence ==
=== Autopsy ===
New York City's Chief Medical Examiner Barbara Sampson conducted a four-hour autopsy on Epstein's body on August 11. Epstein's lawyers sent pathologist Michael Baden to observe the autopsy. Following the autopsy, the medical examiner's office reported that Epstein had hanged himself with a sheet from his bed. The last death ruled a suicide at the MCC was in 1998. Epstein's lawyers released a joint statement after the medical examiner's report, expressing dissatisfaction with it, challenging its conclusions and saying a more complete response was forthcoming. They said that the defense team fully intended to continue its own investigation into the circumstances and cause of Epstein's death, including taking legal action to view the camera footage near his cell during the night of his death. They later said that the evidence concerning Epstein's death was "far more consistent" with murder than suicide.

=== Autopsy report and criticism ===
Epstein's hyoid bone, among others, was broken. It is disputed whether this is more indicative of hanging or strangulation.

On August 16, Sampson announced that Epstein's death had been ruled a suicide via hanging. Later, conflicting reports said the injuries Epstein sustained were as consistent, if not more so, with strangulation or homicide as with suicide. Sampson's report found there was no foul play in his death. Three of Epstein's lawyers expressed their dissatisfaction with Sampson's conclusion, having hired forensic pathologist Michael Baden to observe the autopsy; they said they would initiate their own investigation and provide a more detailed statement in the future. Baden observed Sampson's autopsy when it was conducted; after the autopsy he said he could not comment because of gag orders filed by Sampson's office and Epstein's estate.

On October 30, 2019, Baden issued a report stating that Epstein's neck injuries were much more consistent with "homicidal strangulation" than suicide. He stated that Epstein "had two fractures on the left and right sides of his larynx, specifically the thyroid cartilage or Adam's apple, as well as one fracture on the left hyoid bone above the Adam's apple". In particular, Baden claimed that Epstein's hyoid bone was broken in a way indicative of strangulation from behind. Later that day, Sampson rejected Baden's claims, saying, "I stand firmly behind our determination of the cause and manner of death for Mr. Epstein. The cause is hanging, the manner is suicide." Baden later said, "Going over a thousand jail hangings, suicides in the New York City state prisons over the past 40–50 years, no one had three fractures."

Neurosurgeon and CNN medical correspondent Sanjay Gupta asserted Epstein could have easily broken his hyoid bone in a hanging because of the bone's weakening and loss of flexibility with age. Gupta also suggested that multiple broken neck bones were more characteristic of hanging. Gerald Rodts, chief of spinal surgery at Emory University Hospital, also stated that multiple broken neck bones are consistent with hanging. A professor of forensic science at John Jay College of Criminal Justice, Lawrence Kobilinsky, said the hyoid bone can indeed break from hanging, noting that it is a weak bone. According to their analysis, a broken hyoid bone is not sufficient proof of homicide. According to Baden, the neck wound was in the center of Epstein's neck, not under his mandibles as in a typical hanging. Baden said this is more common when a victim is strangled by a wire or cord. Baden also said that the wound was much thinner than the strip of bedsheet, and although there was blood on Epstein's neck, it was absent on the bed-sheet ligature. In response to Baden's claims, Sampson stood by the conclusion that Epstein's death was suicide. In June 2023, the Justice Department Inspector General affirmed that Epstein died by suicide. The report stated that investigators interviewed dozens of witnesses and reviewed 100,000 documents, and found nothing contradicting the FBI's investigation, which also ruled the death a suicide.

=== Burial ===
Following the autopsy, Epstein's body was claimed by an "unidentified associate", later revealed to be his brother, Mark. On September 5, the body was buried in an unmarked tomb next to those of his parents at the IJ Morris Star of David mausoleum in Palm Beach, Florida. His parents' names were removed from their tombstone to prevent vandalism.

== Aftermath ==
=== Reaction ===
External videos
- Trump: 'I have no idea' if Clintons were involved in Epstein's death on YouTube (0:51)
- Attorney General William Barr says he's "appalled" by Jeffrey Epstein's death in jail on YouTube (1:50)

The first time the public knew about Epstein's death was in the form of a 4chan post, where the poster speculated Epstein was switched out, made thirty-eight minutes before the first mainstream news articles were published about it. The IP address associated with the poster was subpoenaed by the Department of Justice. A few hours after Epstein's death was announced, President Donald Trump responded by retweeting a post related to the "Clinton body count", a conspiracy theory purporting to link Epstein's death to former president Bill Clinton and his wife, the former secretary of state Hillary Clinton. At a speech in Pennsylvania three days later, Trump told reporters he wanted "a full investigation". Attorney General William Barr said he was "appalled" by Epstein's death in federal custody and that it "raises serious questions that must be answered". He ordered an investigation by the Justice Department's Inspector General in addition to the FBI investigation. Senator Ben Sasse, chairman of the United States Senate Judiciary oversight subcommittee, later wrote Barr a letter saying, "The Department of Justice failed." He added, "Given Epstein's previous attempted suicide, he should have been locked in a padded room under unbroken, 24/7, constant surveillance. Obviously, heads must roll." Representative Matt Gaetz, who sat on the United States House Judiciary Committee, called on chairman Jerry Nadler to prioritize investigating the circumstances around Epstein's death over other probes the committee was carrying out. Representative Lois Frankel called for a congressional investigation into Epstein's 2008 plea deal. Senators Kirsten Gillibrand and Rick Scott called for an investigation and expressed their dissatisfaction that Epstein's victims would not find closure in a trial.

I do think there needs to be a full investigation about why he was taken off the suicide watch list; I think it's a strange decision, given that he attempted suicide once already. I want to know why he was left in a circumstance where suicide was even possible.

— Senator Kirsten Gillibrand

On August 11, New York City Mayor Bill de Blasio, then campaigning for president in Iowa, said, "I'm not a conspiracy theorist, but something's way too convenient here, and we need to get down to the bottom of what happened." The next day, the leaders of the House Judiciary Committee, Chairman Jerry Nadler and ranking member Doug Collins, sent the Federal Bureau of Prisons (BOP) 23 questions about Epstein's death. "The apparent suicide of this high-profile and—if allegations are proven to be accurate—particularly reprehensible individual while in the federal government's custody demonstrates severe miscarriages of or deficiencies in inmate protocol and has allowed the deceased to ultimately evade facing justice", they wrote. "Any victims of Mr. Epstein's actions will forever be denied proper recourse and the scintilla of recompense our justice system can provide in the face of such alleged atrocities; the competency and rigor of our criminal justice system has been marred by this apparent oversight". On August 13, Nebraska senator Ben Sasse, the chair of the Senate Judiciary Committee, wrote a letter to Attorney General Barr urging him to "rip up" the 2008 non-prosecution deal for Epstein and his co-conspirators. Sasse argued that the Justice Department must bring Epstein's co-conspirators to justice, despite his death, and added, "This crooked deal cannot stand." On August 19, Barr replaced the BOP director with former director Kathleen Hawk Sawyer. Sasse praised the move.

"For them to pull him off suicide watch is shocking", Cameron Lindsay, a former warden at three federal facilities, told NBC News. "For someone this high-profile, with these allegations and this many victims, who has had a suicide attempt in the last few weeks, you can take absolutely no chances. You leave him on suicide watch until he's out of there." Federal prosecutors in the case called Epstein's death "disturbing" and emphasized they would continue to seek justice for his accusers even after the financier's death. Geoffrey Berman, the U.S. Attorney for the Southern District of New York, said in a statement, "To those brave young women who have already come forward and to the many others who have yet to do so, let me reiterate that we remain committed to standing for you, and our investigation of the conduct charged in the indictment—which included a conspiracy count—remains ongoing."

=== Investigations ===
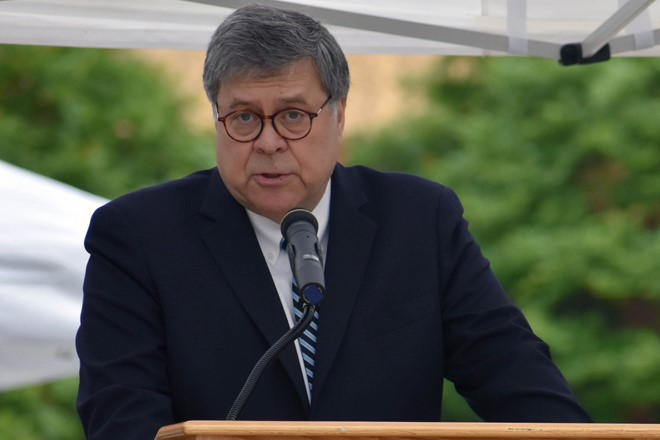
Attorney General William Barr later described Epstein's death as "a perfect storm of screw-ups".

The DOJ launched several investigations into the circumstances of Epstein's death, with Attorney General William Barr saying that Justice Department officials would thoroughly investigate "serious irregularities" at the Metropolitan Correctional Center. As Barr received more information surrounding Epstein's death, however, he came to believe it was only "a perfect storm of screw-ups". In November 2019, BOP director Sawyer told the Senate Judiciary Committee that the FBI was investigating whether a "criminal enterprise" was involved in Epstein's death. She added there is "no indication, from anything I know" that his death "was anything other than a suicide". A spokesperson later explained that she had used the phrase "criminal enterprise" because that was what Senator Lindsey Graham had asked her about, and that "she was referring to looking into possible criminal conduct by staff".

On August 13, 2020, Attorney General Barr ordered the BOP to reassign the warden of the MCC, Lamine N'Diaye, temporarily, while the FBI and Justice Department inspector general investigated the circumstances surrounding Epstein's death. James Petrucci, the warden of FCI Otisville, was named acting warden. Two staff members assigned to Epstein's unit were placed on administrative leave. On August 14, Manhattan federal court judge Richard Berman, who was overseeing Epstein's criminal case, wrote to N'Diaye asking whether an investigation into Epstein's death would include a probe into his prior (July 23) injuries. Judge Berman wrote that, to his knowledge, it had never been definitely explained what they concluded about the incident. In November 2019, Berman called for widespread prison reforms in an open letter to Barr in The New York Times.

External videos
- Ben Sasse presses prison bureau director on Jeffrey Epstein death on YouTube (5:43)
- Epstein guards appear in court on YouTube (1:24)

The United States Department of Justice's Inspector General's investigation report released on June 27, 2023, castigated jail officials for repeated "negligence, misconduct, and outright job performance failures" in connection with Epstein's incarceration and death. It also strongly pushed back on any suggestion that what happened was anything other than a suicide. Two French government ministers, Marlène Schiappa and Adrien Taquet, called for an investigation into the "many unanswered questions" about Epstein's ties to France, calling for the French government to launch its own probe. "The US investigation has highlighted links with France", Schiappa and Taquet said in the statement, according to ABC News. "It thus seems to us fundamental for the victims that an investigation be opened in France so that all is brought to light", a spokesperson for the office told ABC. "The elements received at the Paris prosecutor's office are being analyzed and cross-referenced." In August, the French launched an investigation into alleged Epstein associate Jean-Luc Brunel, who was reported to be hiding in South America. He was arrested on December 16, 2020.

President Donald Trump and Attorney General Pam Bondi on the Epstein files; July 8, 2025

Judge Richard Berman dismissed all charges against Epstein on August 29. As a result, the sex-trafficking investigations and media attention shifted to his alleged associates, like Brunel, Prince Andrew, and Ghislaine Maxwell. In 2025, according to documents obtained by Axios, the Justice Department under the second Trump administration concluded that Epstein was not murdered and there was no purported "client list" featuring names of Epstein's associates. It also released footage of Epstein's cell during his death, though it was missing one minute and was likely modified. On July 8, 2025, Trump was asked if Epstein had ties with any foreign agencies, to which he replied with; "Are you still talking about Jeffrey Epstein? This guy's been talked about for years."; and "We have Texas and all this other stuff, and you're still talking about this creep?". Bondi then claimed there indeed was no client list, and that the reason a minute was missing from the footage of Epstein's cell was because "the minute [from the camera] is missing every night." Trump later claimed on Truth Social that the Epstein files were created by Democrats, saying; "Why are we giving publicity to files written by Obama, Crooked Hillary, Comey, Brennan, and the losers and criminals of the Biden administration?"

Tova Noel, one of the MCC guards on duty at the time of Epstein's death, was asked to testify before the House Oversight Committee in March 2026. Her testimony was postponed.

=== Subsequent criminal trials and developments ===
On November 19, 2019, federal prosecutors in New York indicted MCC guards Michael Thomas and Tova Noel, charging Noel with 5 counts of falsifying records, Thomas 3 counts, and both 1 count of conspiracy to falsify records. The charges were based on video footage obtained by prosecutors, showing that the guards did not check on Epstein for eight hours. Instead, they made personal searches on their computers and slept. According to Geoffrey Berman, the U.S. Attorney for the Southern District of New York, during that time they repeatedly signed records affirming they had performed the required checks. Their bail was set at $100,000. They claimed they were "scapegoats" for larger issues within the federal prison system. In May 2021, a judge approved a deferred prosecution deal, through which the guards can avoid a conviction and sentence if they comply with specific terms.

In a December 2019 court proceeding against Epstein's cellmate Nick Tartaglione, federal prosecutors reported that the surveillance footage from outside Epstein's cell during the July 23 incident had disappeared. Tartaglione's defense, who claimed that the footage showed Tartaglione saving Epstein's life, hoped that it would illustrate Tartaglione's character. His lawyer had requested that the footage be kept on July 25, two days after the incident. Judge Kenneth Karas requested that the government determine what had happened to the footage. Several days later, federal prosecutors reversed their statement, claiming they had found the missing footage. But in January 2020, they admitted the footage had been permanently deleted because of a "clerical error".

On July 2, 2020, almost a year after Epstein was arrested, the FBI arrested and charged Maxwell in Bradford, New Hampshire. The charges included "enticement and conspiracy to entice minors to travel to engage in illegal sex acts, transportation and conspiracy to transport minors with intent to engage in criminal sexual activity, and two counts of perjury". Federal authorities have expressed concerns she might also attempt suicide in custody and have reportedly implemented additional safety protocols. In an August 2020 interview, President Trump said that he "wish[ed] her well", and again questioned whether Epstein's death was a suicide or homicide.

In 2020, associate Jean-Luc Brunel was arrested and charged with the rape of minors by French prosecutors. He later died from an apparent suicide before his trial could proceed. On July 17, 2025, White House press secretary Karoline Leavitt said: "The president would not recommend a special prosecutor in the Epstein case. That's how he feels." In February 2026, newly released Department of Justice (DOJ) documents and surveillance‑video observation logs raised additional questions about activity near Jeffrey Epstein's cell on the night before his death. Investigators reviewing footage from the Metropolitan Correctional Center (MCC) noted an orange‑colored figure moving up the stairway toward Epstein's locked housing tier at approximately 10:39 p.m. on August 9, 2019. An internal FBI memorandum described the figure as "possibly an inmate," while a separate review by the DOJ Office of Inspector General (OIG) concluded it may have been a corrections officer carrying orange linen or bedding. The OIG's final report stated that an unidentified corrections officer appeared on the stairway at 10:39 p.m. and re‑entered camera view at 10:41 p.m. Independent video analysts consulted by CBS News said the movement appeared more consistent with an inmate or someone wearing an orange prison uniform, though this interpretation was not adopted in official findings. Official reviews of Epstein's death have not previously mentioned this figure, and authorities, including then–Attorney General William Barr, had stated that no one entered Epstein's housing tier during the night. The newly released logs appear to contradict those earlier assertions.

== Homicide suspicions and conspiracy theories ==
Epstein's death has spawned skepticism and multiple conspiracy theories. A Rasmussen Reports poll conducted shortly after his death in August 2019 found that only 29% of U.S. adults believed Epstein actually died by suicide, while 42% thought he was murdered to prevent him from testifying against powerful people with whom he associated, and 29% of people were undecided. By November 2019, a Business Insider poll found that those who believed Epstein was murdered outnumbered suicide proponents three to one. In a 2020 poll, Rasmussen found a majority of Americans believed Epstein was murdered, with just 21% believing that he died by suicide. University of Chicago professor Eric Oliver, a conspiracy theory expert, labeled populist sentiment and a mistrust of the political system as major contributors to the widespread rejection of the official narrative.

At an August 27 hearing, Epstein defense attorney Reid Weingarten expressed "significant doubts" that Epstein's death was due to suicide. According to Weingarten, when attorneys met with their client shortly before his death, "we did not see a despairing, despondent, suicidal person". Epstein's brother, Mark, has rejected the possibility of Jeffrey's suicide, claiming, "I could see if he got a life sentence, I could then see him taking himself out, but he had a bail hearing coming up." He also claimed his "life may also be in danger", if Epstein was indeed murdered. Epstein's butler of 18 years also believed that he did not kill himself. In a press conference about two months after Epstein's death, de Blasio declined to endorse chief medical examiner Sampson's conclusions, saying, "Something doesn't fit here. It just doesn't make sense that the highest-profile prisoner in America—you know, someone forgot to guard him." Former US Attorney and Senate Judiciary Committee counsel Brett Tolman said the death was "more than coincidental", considering Epstein's "many connections to powerful people".

Immediately after his death, online conspiracy theorists falsely claimed that the images of Epstein in transport to the hospital were actually that of a body double. They relied on purported differences between the body's ear and Epstein's ear in a juxtaposed photo. Fact-checker Snopes pointed out that the image of Epstein was 15 years old and that it was "more plausible that these discrepancies were the result of aging". In October 2020, over a year after his death, similar false theories emerged that claimed that Epstein had faked his death and was living at Zorro Ranch, his residence in New Mexico.

In a 2025 interview with Todd Blanche, Ghislaine Maxwell said she did not believe Epstein's death was a suicide.

A 2026 BBC Newsnight interview with a Professor Michael Freeman saw the latter claim that Epstein had been strangled, most likely from behind. Professor Freeman's claim was based on his reviewing the medical examiner's file as provided to him by Mark Epstein; the professor claimed to have seen evidence of Jeffrey suffering a left shoulder hemorrhage and facial injuries that appeared to be consistent with a deliberate strike, as well as apparent fingernail marks above the ligature mark on Epstein's neck.

=== Opinion polls ===
Results of aggregated polls of "How did Jeffrey Epstein die?"
| Source | Suicide | Murder | Accidental Death | Unsure | Source |
|---|---|---|---|---|---|
| YouGov (July 2025) | 20% | 39% | 1% | 40% | |
| The Economist/YouGov (August 2025) | 16% | 50% | | 34% | |
| Yahoo/YouGov (July 2025) | 23% | 47% | | 31% | |
| Washington Post (July 2025) | 15% | 44% | | 42% | |

== In popular culture ==
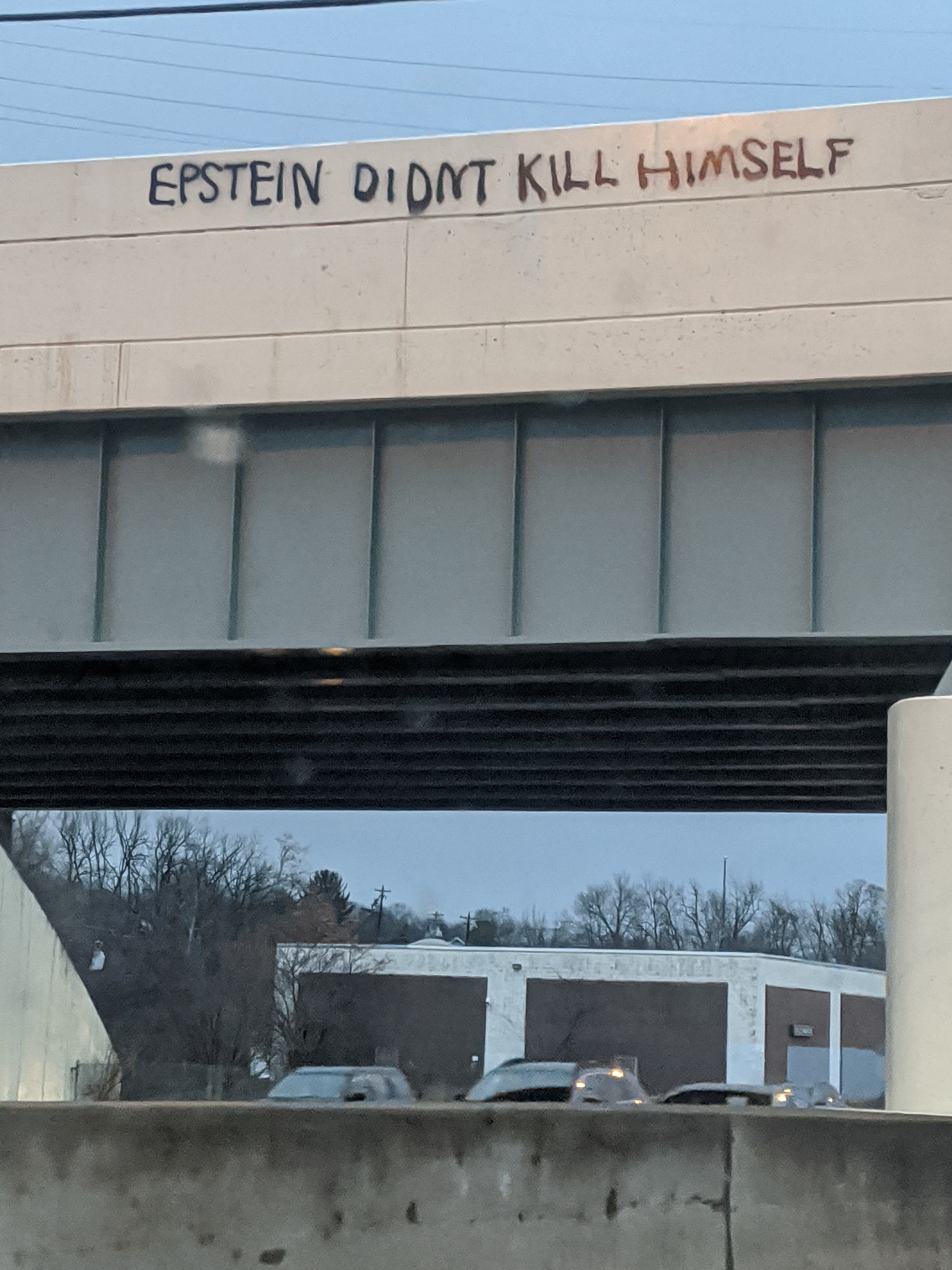
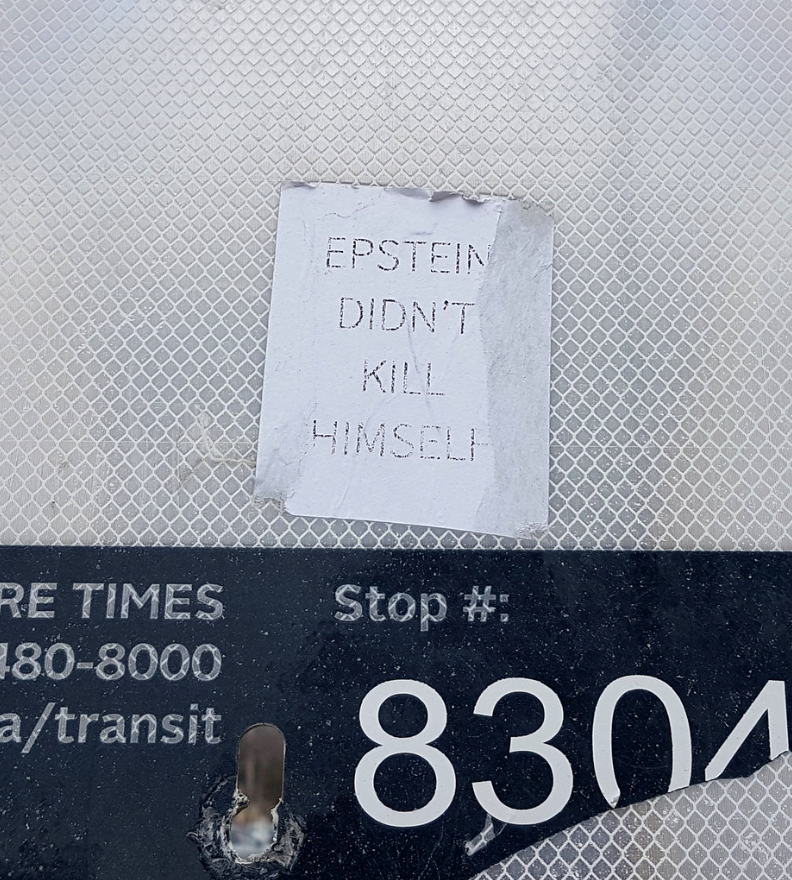
The meme appeared in a variety of forms and places, such as this graffito on an Ohio interstate overpass or this sticker at a bus stop in Canada.

As more information surrounding Epstein's death became public in November 2019, his death and the possibility of murder became a popular Internet meme, particularly in the form of the phrase "Epstein didn't kill himself". The meme gained prominence as it was interjected at the end of live interviews, such as by a Navy SEAL on Fox News, or later by a University of Alabama student on MSNBC. The meme often appears as a non-sequitur after a body of text or within an image. NPR's Scott Simon likened the bait-and-switch aspect of the meme to Rickrolling. Simon also worried that media attention to the meme could spread misinformation. The Associated Press observed that "[t]he phrase 'Jeffrey Epstein didn't kill himself' has taken on a life of its own—sometimes more as a pop culture catchphrase than an actual belief."

Celebrities have comedically referenced Epstein's death. Ricky Gervais remarked at the 77th Golden Globe Awards that Epstein did not take his own life, and Adam Driver played a murdered Epstein in hell on Saturday Night Live. U.S. Representative Paul Gosar posted 23 tweets in which the first letter of each tweet spelled out the meme's phrase. Holiday-themed merchandise (like Christmas sweaters) that prominently featured the phrase also became available for sale through several online retailers.

In an interview with Slate, independent merchandisers indicated that the Christmas/Epstein product lines were selling comparatively well, citing the mashup's dark humor as the reason for their popularity. According to Variety, the Christmas-themed paraphernalia was outselling Game of Thrones merchandise. In the Season 2 finale of the streaming television series The Boys, it was revealed that Stormfront secretly killed Epstein in its alternate timeline. Several television documentaries were created because of increased public interest after his death. In May 2020, Netflix released Jeffrey Epstein: Filthy Rich. As of October 2019, HBO, SonyTV, and Lifetime also have similar works in progress.

== See also ==
- List of federal political scandals in the United States
- List of unsolved deaths
- Jean-Luc Brunel
- Daniel Siad
- White House cover-up allegations concerning the Epstein files
