= Epstein didn't kill himself =

Phrase about Jeffrey Epstein's death

"Epstein didn't kill himself" ("EDKH") is a phrase used by conspiracy theorists to question the official cause of the death of American child sex offender and financier Jeffrey Epstein. Authorities concluded that he died of suicide by hanging in his cell in the Metropolitan Correctional Center in New York City in August 2019. Epstein was a convicted sex offender with connections to and public interactions with many powerful and wealthy people. His incarceration led to public hope that he might reveal the identities of other sex offenders, especially those in positions of authority and influence. When his suicide was reported, numerous hypotheses and conspiracy theories emerged to speculate about the true nature and cause of his death, framing the official suicide narrative as a lie, typically labelling it as part of a cover-up.

The phrase became a colloquialism as well as an internet meme, gaining traction in November 2019 as more of the details surrounding his death became public. "Epstein didn't kill himself" is used by and draws a wide audience, many of whom disagree with each other on the true circumstances surrounding Epstein's death. Generally, however, these theories agree that the true cause of his death was homicide, especially by strangulation, and that it was ordered by those who had engaged in sex offenses with Epstein, so that they could avoid the truth becoming public. These theories often assert the existence of an Epstein client list, or "black book", in which the names of high-profile sex criminals were recorded so that Epstein could blackmail them, should the need arise.

The accusations of murder associated with "Epstein didn't kill himself" are typically levied against people whom the speaker disagrees with politically. In radical right-wing and Republican circles, the most prominent theory holds that the killing was arranged by former United States senator and Secretary of State Hillary Clinton. In leftist and Democratic circles, the theories predominately accuse Donald Trump, who was the sitting US President at the time of Epstein's death. The accusations levied against Trump are usually drawn from his personal relationship with Epstein, while the accusations against Clinton typically connect her to Epstein by way of her husband, former president Bill Clinton, and his relationship to Epstein. Yet more theories also hold that all three — both Clintons and Trump — are culpable in some way.

The phrase "Epstein didn't kill himself" is often inserted into unexpected contexts or at the end of a social media post as a non sequitur. The meme has appeared at multiple televised sports games in the form of signs and painted bodies. Several people have also randomly interjected the phrase at the end of interviews.

== Background ==
Donald Trump pictured in 2000 with president of the United States Bill Clinton, Melania Trump (rightmost), and Kylie Bax (leftmost)

On August 10, 2019, American financier and convicted sex offender Jeffrey Epstein was found unresponsive in his Metropolitan Correctional Center jail cell, where he was awaiting trial on new sex trafficking charges. According to the Department of Justice, Federal Bureau of Prisons official statement, "He was transported to a local hospital for treatment of life-threatening injuries and subsequently pronounced dead by hospital staff." The New York City medical examiner ruled Epstein's death a suicide by hanging. Epstein's lawyers challenged that conclusion and opened their own investigation. Epstein's brother Mark hired board-certified forensic pathologist Michael Baden to oversee the autopsy. In late October, Baden announced that autopsy evidence indicated homicidal strangulation more than suicidal hanging. Both the Federal Bureau of Investigation (FBI) and the U.S. Department of Justice's inspector general conducted investigations into the circumstances of his death, and the guards on duty were later charged with conspiracy and record falsification.

Due to violations of normal jail procedures on the night of Epstein's death, (Note: E.g., the removal of his cellmate without a replacement, possession of banned objects, and the falling asleep of two guards who failed to check on him once every 30 minutes, despite stringent suicide watch precautions that were in effect.) the malfunction of two cameras in front of his cell, and his claims to have compromising information about powerful figures, his death generated doubt about his apparent suicide and speculation that he was murdered. There were also many doubts raised about discrepancies in the video footage that was released by the Department of Justice, as it appeared to have been edited and was missing at least one minute. According to a report by CBS News, "A government source familiar with the investigation says the FBI, the Bureau of Prisons and the Department of Justice inspector general are all in possession of a copy of the video that does not cut from just before 11:59 p.m. to midnight of the night Epstein died by suicide in his cell. What is unclear is why that section was missing when the FBI released what it said was raw footage from inside the Special Housing Unit the night Epstein died, Aug. 9–10, 2019."

At an August 27 hearing, Epstein's defense attorney, Reid Weingarten, expressed "significant doubts" that Epstein's death was due to suicide. According to Weingarten, when attorneys met with their client shortly before his death, "we did not see a despairing, despondent, suicidal person". Epstein's brother, Mark, has rejected the possibility of Jeffrey's suicide, claiming, "I could see if he got a life sentence, I could then see him taking himself out, but he had a bail hearing coming up." Mark also claimed his "life may also be in danger" if Epstein was indeed murdered. In a press conference about two months after Epstein's death, Bill de Blasio, the then mayor of New York City, declined to endorse chief medical examiner Sampson's conclusions, saying, "Something doesn't fit here. It just doesn't make sense that the highest-profile prisoner in America—you know, someone forgot to guard him." Former US Attorney and Senate Judiciary Committee counsel Brett Tolman said the death was "more than coincidental" considering Epstein's "many connections to powerful people".

== Mainstreaming ==
" ... Epstein didn't kill himself."

Seemingly overnight, those last four words, or something close to them, were everywhere: Belted out in videos posted by teenagers to TikTok, the social media platform beloved by Generation Z. Hacked into a roadside traffic sign in Modesto, Calif. Uttered by a University of Alabama student during a live report on MSNBC, hours before the president was set to appear at the school's football game.

— Teo Armus, The Washington Post

At the end of an interview with Jesse Watters on Fox News, former Navy SEAL and founder of the Warrior Dog Foundation Mike Ritland asked if he could give a PSA. After being told that he could, he stated, "If you see the coverage [about combat dogs] and you decide I want one of these dogs, either buy a fully trained and finished dog from a professional or just don't get one at all. That, and Epstein didn't kill himself." Ritland later stated his purpose for suddenly mentioning the phrase was to keep the Jeffrey Epstein story alive. According to The Washington Post, the meme gained a large amount of attention in the immediate aftermath of this interview.

Arizona Republican Congressman Paul Gosar shared the phrase in a series of 23 tweets where the first letter of each tweet spelled out the phrase. Australian rapper Matthew Lambert of Hilltop Hoods, after winning the 2019 ARIA Music Award for Best Australian Live Act, included the phrase in his acceptance speech. In his opening monologue at the 77th Golden Globe Awards, host and comedian Ricky Gervais joked that the suicidal character of his show After Life will come back for a second season. He added: "So in the end, he obviously didn't kill himself—just like Jeffrey Epstein. Shut up. I know he's your friend, but I don't care."

=== Platforms ===
The phrase has been shared by people on a number of platforms, including Facebook and Twitter. Podcast host Joe Rogan and Internet personality Tank Sinatra used Instagram to spread the meme to their followers, who in Rogan's case included Mike Ritland. The meme has also appeared in TikTok videos. Several users on dating apps, such as Tinder and Hinge, have written in their profiles that whether someone accepts the meme's premise is a relationship deal breaker. In the 2020 Mardi Gras celebration in New Orleans, a Le Krewe d'Etat parade float featured a large float with effigies of Epstein and Hillary Clinton.

=== Products ===
Two beer companies, the Michigan-based Rusted Spoke Brewing Co. and the Californian Tactical OPS Brewing, advertised specialty-branded beers in connection to the meme. Rusted Spoke's operations manager told the Detroit Free Press that people just thought the meme was funny. In Switzerland, the Zürich-based company Kaex printed the phrase on promotional material for an anti-hangover product.

Computer programmer, businessman, and presidential candidate John McAfee announced the release of an Ethereum-based token named after the phrase. He had previously expressed doubts about Epstein's death. 700 million tokens of the cryptocurrency were released to 8,000 users following its airdrop. After McAfee died, many, particularly followers of QAnon, started using "McAfee didn't kill himself" in reference to the phrase, the similarities of the reporting, and the fact that McAfee was an outspoken supporter of the phrase.

Holiday-themed merchandise, such as Christmas sweaters, which prominently feature the phrase, also became available for sale through several online retailers. In an interview with Slate, independent merchandisers indicated that the Christmas/Epstein product lines were selling comparatively well and cited the mashup's dark humor for its internet popularity. According to Variety, the Christmas-themed paraphernalia was reportedly outselling Game of Thrones merchandise.

=== Vandalism ===
The phrase has been connected to several incidents of vandalism, including its appearance "on road signs and overpasses around the country". One specific incident saw the meme painted on a seven-foot-high boulder and visible to travelers on Washington State Route 9 in Snohomish, causing some controversy in the local community. The site of a popular art piece at the Art Basel in Miami, Comedian, (Note: The exhibit previously featured a banana duct-taped to a white wall and had been sold for $120,000, but the banana was consumed by a performance artist the day before.) a banana that had been duct-taped to a wall, was vandalized when Roderick Webber of Massachusetts wrote "Epstien [sic] didn't kill himself" in red lipstick on the wall Comedian had previously occupied. Webber was arrested for criminal mischief and reportedly spent a night in jail.

== Reactions ==
NPR's Scott Simon compared the meme's bait-and-switch aspect to rickrolling. He also worried that doing a news story about it could spread misinformation. Federal prosecutors have tried to discourage the spread of the theory, but the Associated Press reported that "[t]he phrase 'Jeffrey Epstein didn't kill himself' has taken on a life of its own—sometimes more as a pop culture catchphrase than an actual belief."

Writer James Poulos cited the advancement of social media and growing populist sentiments for the phrase. Commentators have also suggested that growing distrust of government and the elite played a large factor in its popularity as well. Jeet Heer of The Nation expressed worry that this could lead to the phrase becoming a useful tool for recruitment for the far right; but Adam Bulger, in a featured article for BTRtoday, dismissed Heer's concerns and encouraged the Democratic Party to embrace the phrase.

In an article for Mel magazine published shortly before the Fox News interview, Miles Klee wrote that there were numerous reasons for the phrase's rise online, including a "simmering resentment" and a lack of justice for Epstein's victims. He added that a major attraction of sharing the phrase was that it served to keep the Epstein story in the news cycle. Conversely, author Anna Merlan has argued that the phrase tends to trivialize the concerns of Epstein's victims. But she mentioned that Jane Doe 15, (Note: Jane Doe 15 did not publicly reveal her name, and only said that she was 15 years old at the time of the recounted events from 16 years earlier.) who on November 19, 2019, publicly alleged that Epstein had raped her, (Note: Doe also called on Prince Andrew and any others with relevant information about Epstein to testify what they knew about his criminal conduct while under oath.) wore a bracelet featuring the phrase "Epstein didn't kill himself" at a public press conference.

== See also ==
- Palm Beach Pete
- White House cover-up allegations concerning the Epstein files
