= White House cover-up allegations concerning the Epstein files =

Allegations of a cover-up by the Second Trump Administration regarding the Epstein files have arisen from reports that several documents were missing from the United States Department of Justice's database in March 2025. The missing reports pertain to a woman who alleged sexual assault by Donald Trump following the Jeffrey Epstein case. The Justice Department stated that the reports were mistakenly deleted due to duplicate coding. These missing documents include interviews with the woman from 2019, in which she claims to have been introduced to Trump by Epstein when she was a teenager in the 1980s and accuses both men of sexual assault. Members of the Democratic Party have accused the White House of orchestrating a cover-up. Trump and the White House have issued statements calling the woman's claims baseless and lacking credible evidence.

Democrat Jamie Raskin, a member of the US House of Representatives, criticized the Justice Department for making unclear redactions in documents related to Epstein, hiding the names of abusers while revealing victims' identities.

== Leaked documents ==
At the end of January, the Justice Department released more than 3 million additional pages, including about 2,000 videos and 180,000 images, related to the Epstein Files Transparency Act. These materials were collected from five primary sources: the Florida and New York prosecutions of Epstein, the New York prosecution of Ghislaine Maxwell, the New York inquiry into Epstein's death, the Florida investigation involving Epstein's former waitress, various US Federal Bureau of Investigation (FBI) investigations, and the Office of Inspector General's probe into Epstein's death. It is said, however, that the FBI had compiled a list of allegations against Trump linked to emails from the "Child Exploitation Task Force"—though Trump has long denied any wrongdoing.

The Justice Department found that 302 reports were wrongly marked as duplicates, with 15 documents identified as incorrectly coded. These documents included memos from a federal prosecutor in Florida about the Epstein case from 2007, five of which may now be released while keeping some information confidential. One memo urged quick action to arrest Epstein. FBI 302 reports stated that a woman interviewed four times between July and October 2019 made accusations against Epstein, claiming he introduced her to Donald Trump, alleging abuse during that encounter. Congressional Democrats accused the Justice Department of withholding documents to protect the president.

== The woman's complaint ==
In late July and early August 2025, the FBI's National Threat Operations Center disclosed several allegations of sexual misconduct involving Jeffrey Epstein and Donald Trump. However, none of these claims have been officially verified by the FBI. A significant case involved a woman mentioned in the Justice Department's extensive three-million-page dossier on Trump, who stated that Epstein introduced her to Trump around 1983 when she was approximately 13 years old. The FBI conducted four interviews with both Trump and Epstein regarding this allegation.

During the initial interview, the woman detailed Epstein's methods of abuse and presented investigators with a cut-out photo of Epstein. The woman's background and FBI interview information corresponded with those in one of the victims' complaints. A woman identified as "Jane Doe 4" did not mention Trump in a December 2019 case and voluntarily withdrew her allegations in December 2021. On July 22, 2023, an FBI official reported that a known victim accused Trump of harassment but ultimately declined to cooperate with the investigation.

Only the first interview, dated July 24, 2019, is publicly accessible, and Trump is not mentioned in that document. NPR discovered that 53 pages of documents and interview notes are missing from Epstein's public records, based on serial number analysis.

== Garcia's investigation ==
President Donald Trump and Attorney General Pam Bondi on Jeffrey Epstein, July 8, 2025

California congressman Robert Garcia, a senior committee member, subpoenaed US Attorney General Pam Bondi to testify at the request of Congresswoman Nancy Mays. Garcia reviewed Justice Department documents, including specific and previously unreleased allegations against President Trump, and questioned Bondi about the Department of Justice's lack of evidence regarding President Trump's alleged sexual abuse of an underage victim. Following the subpoena of Bondi, a Democratic watchdog, the Justice Department released classified documents containing serious allegations against President Trump and the underage victim. The FBI reportedly interviewed the witness four times in 2019.

Garcia, a senior member, called for Bondi's resignation after the Department of Justice was found to have spied on members of Congress' search histories and withheld the “unredacted” versions of Epstein's files. Since only 3.5 million of the 6 million pages of Epstein's files have been released by the Justice Department, Garcia demanded the release of all collected pages, and said "This is unacceptable and illegal, and [Attorney General] Pam Bondi and the president need to answer where these files are."

== NPR investigation ==
An NPR investigation concluded that the Justice Department has kept some Epstein-related files secret, specifically those mentioning allegations against President Trump regarding sexual abuse of a minor. Some documents were also removed from public access despite a law requiring their release. The files include over 50 pages of FBI interviews and notes from a woman who accused Trump decades ago. NPR identified numerous files that appear indexed but not shared publicly. The Justice Department declined to answer NPR's questions but stated that unshared documents are classified or connected to ongoing investigations.

== Other investigations ==
Senate Democratic Whip Dick Durbin questioned Justice Department leaders about the investigation into Jeffrey Epstein. He asked Attorney General Pam Bondi, FBI Director Kash Patel, and Deputy Director Dan Bongino about inconsistencies in their statements, reports of pressure to work extended hours on Epstein records, and allegations of lack of transparency. Durbin noted concerns that FBI staff were told to "flag" records mentioning President Trump and asked what happened to those records. His office learned of this from a whistleblower. The FBI did not comment on the letters.

== White House crisis meeting ==
On July 17, 2025, senior officials in President Trump’s administration gathered in the White House Situation Room to address a crisis concerning the Epstein files. This meeting followed the release of a memo by the Department of Justice and the FBI stating that no "client list" associated with Jeffrey Epstein existed—a claim that sparked intense backlash, particularly among the MAGA base. The Wall Street Journal was preparing to publish a damaging article regarding Trump’s ties to Epstein. Vice President J.D. Vance convened a meeting with key officials to discuss the matter. The Vice President appeared concerned about how the Epstein issue was dividing the MAGA coalition. He pushed for the Department of Justice to release all Epstein-related files and proposed a congressional investigation. Vance also suggested that Tucker Carlson interview Ghislaine Maxwell in prison to help exonerate Trump. He believed that the rapid release of the files would demonstrate transparency and forestall lingering suspicions, given that Congress would likely push for their disclosure anyway. Vance argued that even unverified allegations involving Trump should be released to demonstrate good faith and quell conspiracy theories.

== See Also ==
- Epstein files
- Epstein didn't kill himself
- Death of Jeffrey Epstein
