= Spencer Kuvin =

American lawyer based in Florida (born 1969)

Spencer T. Kuvin
- Born: December 3, 1969 (age 56); Miami, Florida
- Education: Florida State University (Bachelor of Arts); St. Thomas University (Juris Doctor)
- Occupation: Lawyer
- Known for: Representing alleged victims of Bill Cosby & Jeffrey Epstein
- Spouse: Corrina Baron-Kuvin
- Children: 3
- Website: www.goldlaw.com

Spencer T. Kuvin (born 1969) is an American lawyer based in Florida. He is best known for representing victims of billionaire financier Jeffrey Epstein.

== Early life ==
Kuvin was born on December 3, 1969, and raised in southern Florida. He attended Florida State University from 1987 through 1991 and was a member of the Florida State Marching Chiefs. While attending Florida State University he was known as "The Vampire" on the school's metal radio station. His father, Lawrence Kuvin, and two of his brothers are lawyers. Spencer Kuvin's father, Lawrence “Larry” Kuvin, was an attorney in Miami-Dade and Broward for more than 50 years, and died at age 80. He had specialized in municipal liability defense, medical malpractice and personal injury cases.

After college, Kuvin attended St. Thomas University Law School, where he graduated from in 1996. His career began as an insurance defense attorney representing such corporations as SmithKline Beecham Clinical Laboratories, Quest Diagnostics and Winn-Dixie. After practicing as a defense attorney in Miami for over five years, Kuvin decided to switch to representing victims of negligence.

Kuvin's first job was working with West Palm Beach attorney Robert Montgomery. From there he went on to become law partners with Ed Ricci and Ted Leopold. Eventually, Kuvin began his own firm and then began running the litigation department at the Law Offices of Craig Goldenfarb in 2013.

== Career ==
Kuvin was admitted to the Florida Bar in 1996 after graduating from St. Thomas University law school. Kuvin began his career defending large multi-national corporations and insurance companies. Beginning in the late 2000s, Kuvin represented three underage girls who claimed that they were victims of sexual abuse perpetrated by Jeffrey Epstein. Kuvin felt that the FBI, which Kuvin says interviewed only one of his three clients, could have built a far stronger case against Epstein.

After Epstein's 2019 arrest, Kuvin predicted that Epstein would be murdered prior to his death in jail. He has also claimed that Ghislaine Maxwell will die in prison. Kuvin spent over a year in court trying to make Epstein's 2007 plea deal public, an effort in which he succeeded. Kuvin has criticized Prince Andrew of the UK for his links to Epstein.

Kuvin represented a car-crash victim in a lawsuit against Tiger Woods, before dropping the case in 2019.

Kuvin has also represented Chloe Goins, a victim of Bill Cosby. Goins was one of the only victims who was able to bring a direct action against Cosby and Hugh Hefner, because her claim still fell within the statute of limitations. He was also one of the only lawyers permitted to proceed with a deposition of Bill Cosby after his conviction.
