= Mike Ritland =

Former US Navy SEAL and nonprofit organizer

Michael B. Ritland born in Waterloo, Iowa is a former United States Navy SEAL, public speaker and dog trainer. He created the Warrior Dog Foundation, to provide care to dogs that have ended their service in battle front, and the Team Dog Online Training Community.

== Military career ==
Ritland joined the US Navy in 1996. Ritland attended BUD/S training at Naval Amphibious Base Coronado and graduated with class 215 in 1998. Ritland served 12 years as a US Navy SEAL with SEAL Team THREE and saw action in Operation Iraqi Freedom and numerous special operations missions. A nearby Marine mission in particular, had a detailed account of an explosive-detector dog alert to a grenade booby trap hidden in a doorway, saving the lives of the Marines assigned to the mission. Ritland then decided to work with similar dogs, and harness their abilities to defeat the tools of modern warfare. Due to that, Ritland became a Navy SEAL Multi-purpose canine trainer.

After his service, Ritland served as the West Coast Navy SEAL Multi-purpose canine trainer. After his time on the west coast, he started Trikos International, which specializes in providing working K9s to celebrities, private individuals, and government agencies. He has over 15 years experience in importing, breeding, raising, and training multiple breeds of working dogs.

Ritland also created the Warrior Dog Foundation, a non-profit special operations K9 retirement foundation, dedicated to serving working military K9s, the special operations community, and their families.

He has been asked to work with various pet companies like Dogtra, Oma's Pride Raw Dog Food, and TEFCO.

He and his personal K9 collaborated in 2013 with Xbox to create Call of Duty: Ghosts, contributing to the creation of the character of the dog (Riley).

=== Online presence ===
In addition to its presence in social networks, Ritland provides online training to dog owners through the Team Dog Online Training Community.

He is credited in helping mainstream the "Epstein didn't kill himself" internet meme at the end of an interview with Jesse Watters on Fox News. Ritland asked if he could give a "PSA". After being told that he could, he stated, "If you see the coverage [about combat dogs] and you decide I want one of these dogs, either buy a fully trained and finished dog from a professional or just don't get one at all. That, and Epstein didn't kill himself." Ritland later stated his purpose for suddenly mentioning the phrase was to keep the Jeffrey Epstein story alive. According to The Washington Post, the meme gained a large amount of attention in the immediate aftermath of this interview.

== Books and publications ==
Mike Ritland is a New York Times Best Selling author:

- Trident K9 Warriors, Publisher St. Martin's Paperbacks, ISBN 978-1250073051
- Navy SEAL Dogs, Publisher St. Martin's Griffin, ISBN 9781250049698
- TEAM Dog, Publisher G.P. Putnam's Sons, ISBN 978-0425276273

He also has been featured in publications such as Town & Country, Police K9 Magazine, K9 Cop Magazine, SOFREP, The Washington Post, the Huffington Post, NYPOST, Men's Journal, Texas Monthly.

== Conferences and media ==
He was keynote speaker for Purdue University's Discovery Lecture Series, for Bucknell University, and for various schools for children across the United States.

He participated in conferences across the country, including Stansberry Conference Series, ESA Security Conference, HITS Training Conference, California Narcotic Canine Association, and IaAWPd Iowa Association of Women Police.

He also has been interviewed by CBS Baltimore, CBS' 60 Minutes, CBS 60-Minutes Overtime, C-SPAN, Fox News, and Fox and Friends, among others.
