= Faith Kates =

American talent agent

- Born: 1957 (age 68–69); Long Island, New York, US
- Education: University of Maryland
- Occupations: Model agent; talent agent
- Known for: friendship with Jeffrey Epstein
- Spouse: Jeffrey Kogan (m. 1993)
- Children: 3

Faith Kates (born 1957) is an American model agent and talent agent. She was the co-founder, alongside Jean-Luc Brunel, of the Next Management modelling agency, and was its head until November 2025. Kates offered her support and "unconditional" friendship to Jeffrey Epstein after he was first convicted for soliciting a child for prostitution in 2009. She was still sending friendly emails weeks before he was arrested again in 2019.

== Early life ==
Kates was born in 1957. She was born and raised on Long Island, New York. She earned a bachelor's degree from the University of Maryland.

== Career ==
Kates started her career in the 1980s at Wilhelmina Models, where she rose to supervise the women’s division, before leaving to begin her own agency.

In 1989, She co-founded the Next Management modelling and talent agency along with the alleged sex trafficker Jean-Luc Brunel, and Joel Wilkenfeld. Kates owned most of the company; the Brunel brothers owned 25 percent.

The agency came to represent clients including Alexa Chung, Milla Jovovich and Billie Eilish. In December 2025, Kates stepped down from Next Management weeks after the release of the files of sex offender Jeffrey Epstein, which documented her friendship with him, saying that it was because she wanted to focus on charity work; industry sources said Kates was forced out of Next Management. Next distanced the company from and ended all legal ties with Kates, and stated that her relationship to Epstein "was completely and absolutely unknown to Next management and its top executives".

Kates was president of the Ovarian Cancer Research Fund, and is said to have helped to raise more than $30 million for research.

== Personal life ==
In 1993, she married Jeffrey Kogan, a real estate investor. They have three children, and homes in New York City and Long Island.

== Relationship with Jeffrey Epstein ==
Kates had a close friendship with Jeffrey Epstein; she introduced Epstein to women and models, and took business advice and discussed multi-million dollar loans from Epstein. There are more than 5,000 mentions of Kates in the Epstein files. She offered her support and "unconditional" friendship after his conviction of soliciting a child for prostitution in 2009. Kates emailed Epstein "Just got home from dinner to a beautiful Prada bag!!! ... Thank you For the beautiful birthday present ... and most importantly for being my friend."

Epstein donated money to a charity founded by Kates, who referred a number of her models to Epstein over their 40 year relationship.

== See also ==
- Connections of Jeffrey Epstein
- List of people named in the Epstein files
