= Gerard Benderoth =

American policeman and strongman (1969–2017)

- Born: February 1, 1969
- Died: March 8, 2017 (aged 48)
- Cause of death: Self-inflicted gunshot wound
- Education: Westchester Community College, Troy State
- Occupations: Policeman, Strongman, Boxer
- Police career
- Department: New York City Police Department, Haverstraw Police Department
- Other work: Strongman, Boxer

Gerard Benderoth (February 1, 1969 – March 8, 2017) was an American policeman and strongman.

== Education ==
He was a football player at North Rockland High School, later attending Westchester Community College and Troy State in Alabama.

== Police career ==
He was a New York City Police officer for more than a decade, and later a local police officer in Haverstraw, Rockland County, New York.

== Strongman ==
He had vied for years to try to win the title "World's Strongest Man".

Standing 5 ft 11 in (1.80 m) tall, he weighed 325 pounds (147 kg) and, before crowds of up to 20,000, he had done everything from carrying 450-pound stones to deadlifting 825-pound cars.

== Boxer ==
Benderoth was also a boxer, his skills qualified him for the 1996 Hudson Valley boxing team at the Empire State Games. In 1995, he was a New York Golden Gloves super heavy weight 220-pound finalist, losing by decision.

== Death ==
Benderoth died on March 8, 2017, age 48, from a self-inflicted gunshot wound when he was pulled over by FBI agents and local police officers just a short drive from his home. The FBI reportedly planned to arrest Benderoth on a sealed indictment related to the Tartaglione multiple murder and drug conspiracy case.

== Personal life ==
Benderoth lived in Stony Point, Rockland County, New York, with his wife and four children.

== Achievements ==
- 2006 - America's Strongest Man 13th
- 2007 - America's Strongest Man 14th
- 2008 - America's Strongest Man 10th
