= Nicholas Tartaglione =

American police officer and murderer (born 1967)

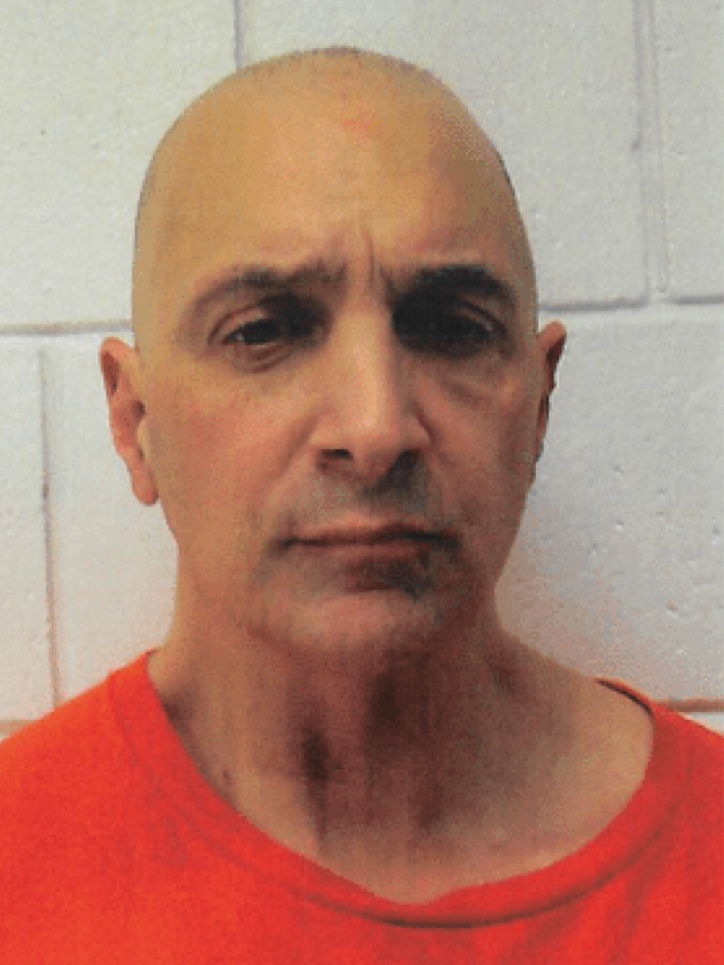
- Tartaglione in 2019
- Born: October 10, 1967 (age 59); Westchester County, New York, US
- Education: Westchester County Police Academy
- Occupation: Police officer
- Criminal charges: Murder (11 counts); Kidnapping resulting in death (4 counts); Kidnapping conspiracy; Narcotics conspiracy
- Penalty: 4 life sentences

Details
- Victims: 4
- Date: April 11, 2016
- Country: United States
- State: New York
- Date apprehended: December 19, 2016
- Imprisoned at: Atwater

Nicholas John Tartaglione (/ˌtɑːrtæɡˈliːoʊn/ TAR-tag-LEE-ohn; born October 10, 1967) is an American mass murderer and former police officer who was convicted of drug trafficking and the murder of four people. He is also known for being a cellmate of Jeffrey Epstein.

After graduating from the Westchester County police academy in 1993, Tartaglione worked at several local departments. From 1996 to 2008, Tartaglione worked for the Briarcliff Manor Police Department, where he was accused of harassment, stalking and police brutality by local activist and public-access television show host Clay Tiffany. After Tartaglione retired from policing, he became involved in steroid and cocaine trafficking.

On April 11, 2016, Tartaglione and two co-conspirators kidnapped and murdered four men in Orange County. The intended victim, 41-year-old Martin Luna, was murdered due to a drug-trafficking-related money dispute between him and Tartaglione. The other three victims, 25-year-old Miguel Luna, 35-year-old Urbano Santiago and 43-year-old Hector Gutierrez, were killed solely for being with Luna at the time of the ambush. A trial found Tartaglione guilty of the drug-related murders, and he was sentenced to four consecutive life sentences on June 10, 2024.

While awaiting trial, Tartaglione was the cellmate of Jeffrey Epstein at Metropolitan Correctional Center. On July 23, 2019, 18 days before his death, Epstein was found in their cell with injuries to his neck. Epstein initially told guards that Tartaglione had caused the injuries, but later recanted this statement. An internal prison report found that Tartaglione had no connection to the event and declared the incident an attempted suicide. However, Tartaglione has remained a subject of conspiracy theories relating to Epstein's death.

== Early life ==
Nicholas John Tartaglione was born on October 10, 1967, in Westchester County, New York, to Geraldine and Nicholas Tartaglione. He, along with his brother Michael, grew up in Yonkers, New York. Tartaglione graduated from Archbishop Stepinac High School in 1985.

== Career ==
=== Early policing career ===
Tartaglione graduated from the Westchester County Police Academy in 1993 and began working at the Mount Vernon Police Department. He was transferred to the Yonkers Police Department in February 1994, but resigned 13 weeks later. In September 1995, he joined the Pawling Police Department where he worked with the K9 Unit. In April 1996, Tartaglione resigned and joined the Briarcliff Manor Police Department. Following his departure from Pawling, Tartaglione and four other ex-officers sued the department for retaliation, alleging they were forced to resign after attempting to form a union. A judge later dismissed the lawsuit.

=== Clay Tiffany dispute and legal troubles ===
Tartaglione's time at the Briarcliff Manor Police Department was heavily impacted by a years-long conflict with local political activist and public-access television host Clay Tiffany. The dispute began in March 1997, when Tartaglione issued Tiffany a $50 traffic violation ticket for having an expired inspection sticker. Following this incident, Tiffany, who was known for scrutinizing local government officials and police officers, began criticizing Tartaglione on his local cable television show Dirge for the Charlatans. Tiffany claimed that during the arrest, Tartaglione made racist comments, threatened Tiffany with violence, and stated that he could use his Italian-American Mafia connections to harm Tiffany. In May 1998, Tiffany claimed that while he was filling out a police complaint form in his car, Tartaglione forced him out of the vehicle and physically carried Tiffany over his shoulder into the police station. He also claimed that in December of the same year he attended a hearing where Tartaglione was testifying, after which he followed Tiffany in his police vehicle, pulled him over, and broke his nose. On the afternoon of May 16, 1999, Tartaglione arrested Tiffany after he entered the Briarcliff Manor municipal building's parking lot while shouting at passersby that there was a conspiracy against him orchestrated by Tartaglione and the village government. Tiffany was charged with disorderly conduct and resisting arrest, the former of which he was convicted though this decision was later overturned.

In 1999, Tiffany was charged with second degree harassment, after Tartaglione claimed that he stalked him and made harassing phone calls to Tartaglione's father. Tartaglione filed a $12 million libel lawsuit against Tiffany, citing statements he made about Tartaglione on Dirge for the Charlatans. On July 17, 1999, Tartaglione arrested Tiffany in Scarborough Park, after Tiffany finished his usual nightly swim in the Hudson River, and charged him with assaulting a police officer, resisting arrest and trespassing. The altercation left Tiffany hospitalized with chemical conjunctivitis (from mace), a broken nose, two broken ribs and several lacerations on his face, and Tartaglione with a fractured hand bone. Following the altercation, both the county district attorney and the FBI began investigating Tartaglione for police brutality. In April 2002, the FBI notified Tartaglione that they did not find enough evidence to convict him.

In August 1999, Tartaglione was suspended from the police force and charged with first-degree perjury. According to the complaint, Tartaglione stated during a Department of Motor Vehicles hearing that a defendant suspected of driving under the influence was not read their Miranda rights because both Tartaglione and his partner thought the other had done so. However, prosecutors argued that Tartaglione was not scheduled to work with a partner that night and thus the mix-up could not have occurred as stated. Following Tartaglione's suspension, all open charges against Tiffany were dropped. Tartaglione was acquitted of the perjury charge in November 1999. Despite the acquittal, the Briarcliff village trustees fired Tartaglione in March 2001. In November of that year, a judge ruled that Tartaglione had been denied due process and the village must either reinstate him with back pay or negotiate a settlement package. Following the ruling, Tartaglione filed two lawsuits against the village: a $3 million civil suit regarding the violation of his due process rights and a case to get his job back. In November 2002, the civil suit was dismissed but in 2003, Tartaglione won reinstatement and $320,000 in back pay.

In 2000, Tiffany filed a civil suit against the village of Briarcliff Manor and Tartaglione, claiming they engaged in a "persistent pattern of intentional negligence [and] reckless indifferent to [his] constitutional rights," specifically citing the alleged instances of police brutality by Tartaglione. Tiffany was represented by lawyers Omar Mohammedi and Deveraux Cannick, who had the previous year sued the New York City Police Department on behalf of the family of Amadou Diallo. In 2003, Briarcliff Manor settled with Tiffany for $2 million.

=== Later career ===
Six months after Tartaglione was reinstated at the Briarcliff Manor Police Department, he was hit by a car which badly injured his elbow. He was placed on disability leave and officially retired from policing in 2008 after New York's Comptroller Office granted him a disability pension. In 2009, Briarcliff Manor village manager Phillip Zegarelli stated that Tartaglione's official retirement was part of an undisclosed "settlement." As his parents owned a dog grooming parlour and he was experienced with animals, Tartaglione opened his own animal shelter. In 2015, he bought an acreage in Otisville, Orange County to house the horses and dogs he rescued.

== Criminal activity and imprisonment ==
=== Drug trafficking and murders ===
In 2013, Tartaglione began selling steroids to fellow bodybuilders and weightlifters outside of local gyms around Orange County. Through this, he met and befriended Joseph Biggs and Gerard Benderoth, who began working for him as debt collectors. According to Tartaglione's sentencing memroandum, Tartaglione also provided Biggs with illicit cannabis and pills to resell. Prior to his involvement in cocaine trafficking, state police had begun investigating Tartaglione for drug trafficking and money laundering after two undercover officers bought more than US$1,000 worth of anabolic steroids from him in the parking lot of a Gold's Gym.

In 2015, Tartaglione hired Marcos Cruz to work as a farmhand on his animal rescue farm. Shortly after, Cruz introduced Tartaglione to his friend Martin Luna. Luna managed a construction business owned by Jason Sullivan, who had recently moved from New York to Florida. By June 2015, Tartaglione, Luna and Sullivan were involved in a drug trafficking operation together. Their operation involved Tartaglione providing the front money to Luna, who would go to Texas and buy cocaine from a member of the Mexican cartel. The cocaine would then be stored in Sullivan's house in Florida while he arranged for it to be sold.

In late 2015, Luna returned to Texas with over US$200,000 from Tartaglione to buy more cocaine. However, according to Luna, his supplier took the money without providing more drugs. Following this, Luna spent several months avoiding Tartaglione. Tartaglione had Biggs pressure Luna to repay him the money. When Luna did not repay him, Tartaglione asked Sullivan to help lure Luna to him so he could confront Luna about the missing money.

On April 10, 2016, at 12:47 PM, Sullivan called Luna and asked him to do a series of construction estimates around Orange County the following day. The last estimate, a fake job, was to be done at Likquid Lounge, a bar in Chester owned by Tartaglione's brother Michael. Tartaglione planned to confront Luna at the bar, along with Biggs and Benderoth. According to Sullivan, the group expected Luna to be alone when he arrived.

On April 11, 2016, around 03:00 PM, Luna was seen in a 2010 Chevrolet Equinox in Chester with his nephews, 25-year-old Miguel Luna and 35-year-old Urbano Santiago, and their family friend 43-year-old Hector Gutierrez. None of the men were heard from after 05:00 PM, when Miguel last spoke with a relative on the phone. Shortly after, all four men arrived at the bar. According to the testimonies of Sullivan and Biggs, Biggs and Benderoth restrained all four men with duct tape at gunpoint when they entered the building. Tartaglione arrived at the bar a short time after and took Luna into the bathroom, where he beat him and asked for the location of his money. When Luna did not provide a location, Tartaglione forced at least one of the other men to watch as he strangled Luna to death with a zip-tie.

An hour after entering the bar, Tartaglione exited to the parking lot where he backed up his Ford Explorer to the entrance and opened the trunk. He returned to the bar and wrapped Luna's body in a tarp. During this time, Cruz was called to the bar to identify the three men accompanying Luna. According to Cruz, he told Tartaglione not to release them as they would go to the police. Tartaglione returned to the parking lot an hour later, put Luna's body into his truck, and drove it to his acreage in Otisville. Biggs and Benderoth followed behind him, driving Miguel, Santiago and Gutierrez to the same location. Once there, the men were forced to kneel on the ground. Biggs, Benderoth and Tartaglione each shot one man in the back of the head with a single bullet, and then dug a large grave for the bodies. Cruz finished filling the hole the next day.

=== Investigation and arrest ===
Luna, Miguel, Santiago and Gutierrez were reported missing on April 15. The following day, police were notified of an abandoned vehicle in the Chester Diner parking lot, next to the Likquid Lounge, which they identified as Santiago's vehicle. When police canvassed businesses in the area for their surveillance footage, employees at Likquid Lounge told police that their system was broken. Three weeks later, the bar closed for renovations. Investigators were able to secure footage from another business that showed the bar's parking lot. The footage showed the arrivals of all seven men at the bar, Tartaglione pulling his truck up to the entrance, the men throwing an "unidentified, large heavy object" into his trunk, and Benderoth driving his vehicle to the back entrance.

In June 2016, investigators obtained data from the cell towers near the bar, which confirmed the presence of all seven men near the bar at the same time. Later that month, they requested a warrant to search Tartaglione's cellphone. In December, police interviewed Cruz, who confessed his involvement and led them to the location of the bodies on Tartaglione's acreage. Based on the cellphone records and Cruz's testimony, police charged and arrested Tartaglione on December 19, 2016. They obtained a warrant to search Tartaglione's Otisville property and a second property on December 20. The FBl's Hudson Valley Safe Streets Task Force was in charge of the search and found the graves the same day. Investigators then obtained a warrant to search Likquid Lounge, where they found blood containing Martin Luna's DNA on a baseboard.

In 2017, police indicted and arrested Sullivan and Biggs. In March, while FBl agents were preparing to arrest him, Benderoth shot and killed himself in his car.

=== Trial and conviction ===
Prosecutors arraigned Tartaglione on December 19, 2016. He pleaded not guilty. The unsealed indictment charged Tartaglione with participating in a drug trafficking conspiracy and with four connected acts of murder under the Continuing Criminal Enterprise Statute (21 U.S.C. § 846 and 848), charges which carry mandatory minimum sentences of life imprisonment as well as the possibility of the death penalty. For the period of 2016 to 2023, Tartaglione's trial saw extensive delays for several reasons including litigation related to the possible application of the death penalty, the investigation of Jeffrey Epstein's injury and death in federal custody, and a year-long Curcio hearing which resulted in the removal of one of Tartaglione's attorneys due to a conflict of interest. Prosecutors ultimately withdrew their intent to seek the death penalty in 2022.

The trial of Tartaglione began in the White Plains federal court on March 16, 2023. Tartaglione was defended by attorneys Bruce Barket and Aida Leisenring, while the prosecution was led by Maurene Comey and Jacob R. Fiddleman. The presiding judge was Kenneth M. Karas.

The prosecution's case relied heavily on surveillance footage, cell phone records, and the witness testimony of Cruz, Sullivan and Biggs. Cruz, who testified to helping bury the bodies, was convicted of drug conspiracy and accessory to murder and sentenced to time served before being deported. Sullivan, who testified to the drug trafficking operation and luring Luna to the bar, was convicted of drug and kidnapping conspiracy and sentenced to 10 years in federal prison. Biggs, who testified to the kidnapping and murder of the four men, was convicted on kidnapping, murder and firearm charges, and sentenced to 16 years in federal prison.

Tartaglione's defense argued that he was the victim of a frameup and police tunnel vision, focusing on the ties of Cruz, Luna and Santiago to Mexican drug traffickers and theorizing that they had set up Tartaglione as a fall guy. Barket and Leisenring argued that because New York State Police were already investigating Tartaglione for steroid trafficking, once his name was connected to Luna and Santiago, they developed "Operation Italiano Burros" intending to frame Tartaglione as a cocaine trafficking ringleader. They also suggested Cruz buried the bodies without Tartaglione's knowledge. In his closing statements, Barket argued that Biggs and Sullivan's perjured themselves with self-statements that were either self-serving or tainted by Cruz's intimidation.

On April 6, 2023, after one day of deliberation, the 12-person jury found Tartaglione guilty on all counts. In the penalty phase, prosecutors requested the maximum punishment of four life sentences to be served consecutively, "one for each victim that Tartaglione brutally and senselessly executed." Judge Karas agreed to this sentence on June 10, 2024.

In 2025, Tartaglione began petitioning Donald Trump for a presidential pardon with the support of the influencer Jessica Reed Kraus.

== Epstein incident ==
=== Initial 2019 incident ===
After Tartaglione was arrested, he was imprisoned at Metropolitan Correctional Center while he awaited trial. Tartaglione was placed in general population—something which is often avoided as former police officers face higher rates of violence in prison. On February 11, 2018, he was attacked by another inmate who fractured his orbital bone. He was hospitalized for two weeks and then placed in an empty cell in the prison's Special Housing Unit. On July 6, 2019, Jeffrey Epstein was arrested and charged with multiple counts of sex trafficking, and placed in the same cell as Tartaglione. Tartaglione's lawyers said the two had a cordial relationship, though Tartaglione later said in an internal prison interview that Epstein made him feel "uncomfortable."

On July 23 at 1:27 am, a guard responded to a body alarm in the housing unit and found a semiconscious Epstein on the floor of his cell with injuries to his neck. According to Tartaglione, who was interviewed by prison officials several days later, he was sleeping on the floor of their cell when he felt something touch his foot. After removing his headphones and taking off a sheet covering his head, he found Epstein sitting on the floor of the cell with his eyes open. Tartaglione called his name several times without response, causing him to bang on the cell door and call out to the guards for help. In a 2024 letter Tartaglione sent to a judge as part of his motion for a new trial, he also claimed to have performed CPR on Epstein.

An unnamed guard, who removed Epstein from the cell and placed him on a stretcher, reported that Epstein accused Tartaglione of trying to kill him. According to the guard, Epstein stated that a week earlier, Tartaglione had been given a copy of Daily News where he learned that Epstein was worth US$77 million. After that, Tartaglione had tried to extort him—threatening to beat him up if he did not pay him money. One unnamed source later claimed that Epstein had told him the day before the incident that he feared Tartaglione, and another claimed Epstein told his lawyers Tartaglione had inflicted the injuries on him. However, in an internal interview by the prison several days later, Epstein stated the incident was caused by his chronic insomnia and that he did not feel threatened by Tartaglione.

An internal prison investigation was conducted following the event, which cleared Tartaglione of any connection or wrongdoing. According to an unnamed prison official at the facility, most staff felt that Epstein had attempted suicide and that his initial story to the guard about Tartaglione was an attempt to avoid being put on suicide watch.

=== Aftermath ===
Following the incident, Epstein was moved from their shared cell to an observation cell. Tartaglione later found an alleged suicide note tucked inside a graphic novel left by Epstein, which stated that "it is a treat to be able to choose one's time to say goodbye." Following Epstein's death on August 10, Tartaglione claimed that he was threatened and harassed by guards who did not want him to speak publicly about Epstein. He claimed that this was because the incident highlighted the poor living conditions and frequent mistreatment of detainees in Metropolitan Correctional. On August 21, after being informed about the living conditions by Tartaglione's lawyers, a judge ruled that conditions at the facility were unacceptable and needed to improve.

Despite being cleared of any connection to the initial incident or Epstein's subsequent death, Tartaglione has remained a subject of conspiracy theories. He has repeatedly responded to the allegations against him and denies harming Epstein. Tartaglione stated that he believes the July 23 incident was an attempted suicide, and claimed that Epstein previously offered Tartaglione money to kill him. In late 2019, his lawyers filed an official request to obtain the surveillance footage from that night, but were told it had been erased due to a "data entry error."

While investigating the initial incident, the courts also identified a conflict of interest for one of Tartaglione's attorneys, John Weider. This discovery led to a year-long Curcio hearing, headed by Bobbi Sternheim, who later represented Ghislaine Maxwell. During the hearing, the handwritten note found by Tartaglione was entered into evidence, and subsequently sealed with the rest of the Curcio report after the hearing was concluded. In September 2025, Tartaglione publicly discussed the note for the first time during an interview, leading to The New York Times requesting that both the note and the entire Curcio report be unsealed. In 2026, Tartaglione's defence team submitted a letter to the court endorsing the release of the note but not the entire report. Judge Karas agreed with Tartaglione's counsel and approved the release of only the note on May 6.
