= Maayan Keret =

Israeli model and actress

- מעין קרת
- Born: 24 April 1976 (age 50); Israel
- Occupations: Model; Actress; Entrepreneur; Lecturer; Activist
- Known for: Founder of Your Runway organization; Advocacy on body image and self-esteem; Criticism of modeling industry practices

Maayan Keret (Hebrew: מעין קרת; born 24 April 1976) is an Israeli model, actress, entrepreneur, lecturer, and activist. She founded the Your Runway organization, which leads workshops for girls about body image and self esteem. Keret said she was raped at the age of 12. Since then, she has been harassed or assaulted so many times she "stopped counting."

A successful model at only 17 years old, Keret was featured in fashion magazines such as Vogue, Elle, and Marie Claire. Keret worked with leading designers such as Yves Saint Laurent, Marc Jacobs, Calvin Klein, and Donna Karan. She is known for her non-traditional perspectives on how the female body should be represented in Israel’s media.

Keret became known for outspoken criticism of the manner in which models are treated and the harsh conditions under which they often work.

Keret wrote and published The Beautiful Women, a non-fiction book with real-life narratives of models and actresses who have struggled with eating disorders and body image issues. Keret said she had developed an eating disorder after she "felt a lot of pressure from everyone" to continually lose weight.
