= Jean-Luc Brunel =

French model scout and sex trafficker (1946–2022)

- Brunel in 2001
- Born: Jean-Luc Didier Henri René Brunel; 18 September 1946; Neuilly-sur-Seine, France
- Died: 19 February 2022 (aged 75); Paris, France
- Cause of death: Suicide
- Occupation: Model scout
- Years active: 1970s–2019
- Known for: Former head of Karin Models and MC2 Model Management
- Status: Deceased
- Criminal charges: Sexual harassment and rape of minors

Jean-Luc Didier Henri René Brunel (French: [ʒɑ̃ lyk didje ɑ̃ʁi ʁəne bʁynɛl], 18 September 1946 – 19 February 2022) was a French model scout and alleged sex trafficker. He gained prominence by leading the international modelling agency Karin Models, and founded MC2 Model Management with financing by Jeffrey Epstein. The subject of a 60 Minutes investigation in 1988, Brunel faced allegations of procuring prostitution and sexual assault spanning three decades.

Brunel came under scrutiny for his ties to Epstein, with whom he worked from the early 2000s to 2015 after Ghislaine Maxwell had introduced them. He was accused by Virginia Giuffre of grooming girls including herself and of taking part in an alleged sex trafficking operation involving Epstein, but denied involvement in any illegal activities with Epstein.

Following Epstein's death in 2019, Brunel went into hiding. The Paris prosecutor's office launched an investigation into crimes committed by Epstein and others in August of the same year, mentioning Brunel by name. He was arrested on 16 December 2020 and was charged with sexual harassment and the rape of minors. Before his trial could proceed, Brunel died by suicide at La Santé Prison on 19 February 2022.

In the 2026 release of the Epstein files, Brunel was listed in a 2019 document as one of the people "the FBI once called co-conspirators" of Epstein. French authorities announced they were reexamining his case in February 2026.

== Early life ==
Jean-Luc Brunel was born on 18 September 1946 into an upper middle class family in Neuilly-sur-Seine, an urban commune west of Paris. He had one brother, Arnaud, and one sister. One of his parents was a real estate executive.

He began his career in restaurant public relations and then moved towards the fashion industry.

== Career ==
In the late 1970s, Brunel began working as a scout for Karin Models, Karin Mossberg's modeling agency in Paris. By 1978, he was running the company. By the 1980s, Brunel was a prominent member of the Paris social scene, where he cultivated interactions with VIPs, frequented Les Bains Douches nightclub, and hosted dinners and after-parties with models at his apartment on Avenue Hoche near Karin Models headquarters.

In 1988, Brunel and his brother Arnaud founded the Next Management Corporation. The following year, together with Faith Kates, they formed the Next Model Management Company, a global modeling agency. Kates owned most of the company; the Brunel brothers owned 25 percent. American Photo reported that Brunel split off from Next Management Company in April 1996 with models from the Miami office. Next Model Management sued the Brunel brothers in 1996.

Brunel claimed to have discovered a number of models who rose to prominence, including Christy Turlington and Sharon Stone. Building on these early successes, he founded Karin Models of America in 1995. After Brunel was included in a BBC One MacIntyre Undercover report on abuse within the fashion industry in November 1999, he was banned from his modeling agency in Europe. In the early 2000s, Brunel moved to the United States. The Daily Beast reported that he relied on funding from his brother Arnaud and their business partner, Étienne des Roys. In 2003, both financiers pulled out and after the "Paris office filed to revoke Brunel's claim to the Karin trademark in 2004", he changed the name of the agency to MC2.

Clients of MC2 reportedly included Nordstrom, Macy's Inc., Saks Fifth Avenue, Neiman Marcus, JCPenney Co., Kohl's Corporation, Target Corporation, Sears, and Belk. According to an accounting firm, MC2 lost an estimated $49 million between 2006 to 2015. MC2 was dissolved in Miami on 27 September 2019, but a branch remained active in Tel Aviv as of early 2026. In 2019, it was reported that Brunel sold off some of the MC2 assets to help create The Identity Models in New York City and 1Mother Agency in Kyiv, Ukraine.

== Alleged sexual abuse and sex trafficking ==
=== 1988 60 Minutes episode ===
In 1988, Brunel was the subject of a seven-month investigation by CBS producer Craig Pyes and reporter Diane Sawyer for 60 Minutes. The investigative segment, "American Models in Paris", which aired in December 1988, covered the conduct of Brunel and fellow Parisian modeling agent Claude Haddad. Several American models who worked with Brunel told 60 Minutes that he fostered a culture in which the models were routinely drugged and sexually abused.

Eileen Ford (of the New York-based Ford Modeling Agency), who had sent her models to Brunel for assignments in Paris, told 60 Minutes that she had not known that models complained of sexual exploitation and drug abuse by Brunel. He denied the claims, but Ford severed ties with him after the broadcast.

=== Later allegations ===
In 1995, Michael Gross reported in Model: The Ugly Business of Beautiful Women that Brunel had admitted to using cocaine for half a decade. Brunel said he did not have a drug problem since he refrained from using cocaine during the day. According to Gross, after he took over Karins, Brunel was known within the modeling industry for sharing his models with his friends. John Casablancas told Gross that Brunel would fly girls from Karins to Saint-Tropez for the weekend and that he had "cheapened the business" and "should be behind bars" as he was among a group of three men known to regularly "invite girls and put drugs in their drinks."

In 2002, Karen Mulder, a onetime protege of Brunel, described to the French press a widespread culture of sexual misconduct and manipulation prevalent in the modeling industry.

New Zealand model Zoë Brock wrote in October 2017 that Brunel had offered her drugs and propositioned her for sex in 1991 when she was sent by her modeling agency to live with him in Paris at age 17.”

Dutch former model Thysia Huisman said in 2019 that after meeting Brunel at her agency in Brussels in 1991 her regional modeling agent reassured her that Brunel would take care of her, would help her career, and that it was a special opportunity for her to stay with him in Paris. Huisman said she initially had to sleep on the floor in the models quarters of his apartment. She alleged that on her fourth or fifth night in Paris, Brunel drugged her drink and raped her when she was 18 years old in 1991. Huisman left Paris within a week of arriving to work with Brunel and did not return to the city until November 2019 when she met with the magistrates investigating him.

In August 2019, the Guardian published an article citing three former models who told the newspaper that Brunel had sexually assaulted them in and around Paris in the 1980s and 1990s. A photographer working for Brunel at Karin Models around that time referred to Brunel as "a vile pig". One of the models, Courtney Soerensen, who featured in the 1988 60 Minutes episode, alleged that as a 19-year-old model, Brunel had sexually assaulted her.

CBS reported in October 2019 that a Canadian former model made a sworn statement to French police accusing Brunel of drugging her drink and raping her in 1987.

In 2022, Soerensen further alleged that Brunel had also "pimped" her out to friends, including Jeffrey Epstein, who assaulted her. Five other former models gave detailed accounts of Brunel drugging and raping them when they were in their teens in the 1980s and 1990s. All of the women were working abroad as models in Paris when they say they were manipulated and abused by Brunel. One model said she was raped twice by Brunel in 1996, prompting her to leave Paris and inform her original US-based modeling agents. One of her agents told the Guardian that when he confronted Karin Models about the abuse, he was warned not to pursue the matter any further because Brunel was connected to the Russian mafia and could ensure any accusers could be made to "disappear".

=== Relationship with Jeffrey Epstein ===
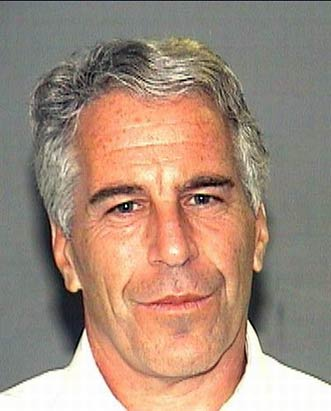
Virginia Giuffre accused Brunel of having sexually trafficked girls, including herself, for Jeffrey Epstein.

Brunel had met Ghislaine Maxwell in the 1980s, and she later introduced him to Jeffrey Epstein. Brunel and Epstein's relationship strengthened in the late 1990s. From 1998 to 2005, Brunel was listed as a passenger in flight logs for Epstein's private plane on 25 trips. In 2005, Epstein wired Brunel up to US$1 million to help launch a new modeling agency, MC2 Model Management. Brunel transformed Karin Models' U.S. division into MC2, opening offices in New York City and Miami in 2005. The agency name evokes Epstein through a reference to Albert Einstein's equation for mass energy equivalency or E=mc^{2}.

After Epstein was convicted of sex offenses in 2008, Brunel visited him in jail at least 70 times during the 13 months he served.

The first to allege that Brunel was involved in Epstein's trafficking was Virginia Roberts Giuffre, who alleged in a 2014 court filing that Brunel would offer "modeling jobs" to girls as a cover for sex trafficking to Epstein. Giuffre alleged that she was sexually trafficked to Brunel while she was underage in the early 2000s. Giuffre claimed in a 2015 affidavit that Epstein bragged to her that he had "slept with over 1,000 of Brunel's girls". She also named Brunel as one of the men Maxwell had directed her as a teenager to have sex with. Brunel denied involvement in any illegal activities with Epstein: "I strongly deny having committed any illicit act or any wrongdoing in the course of my work as a scouter or model agencies manager."

In a sworn statement from 2010, Brunel's former bookkeeper for Karin Models and MC2, Maritza Vasquez, said that Brunel housed models in Epstein's condos at 301 E. 66th St. in New York City. Employees of MC2 also said they were paid to help obtain visas for the young girls staying in the condos.

Brunel filed a lawsuit against Epstein in January 2015 in Miami-Dade County, Florida. The suit claimed that he and MC2 had lost millions in revenue due to Epstein's high-profile legal troubles which prompted model scouts and Elite Model Management to avoid doing business with the agency. He also alleged that Epstein had obstructed justice by directing Brunel to avoid having his deposition taken in the criminal case against Epstein by the Palm Beach Police Department. The lawsuit was later settled under undisclosed terms.

In 2016, Brunel was secretly in contact with lawyers representing Epstein's victims. His lawyers reportedly said that Brunel recruited girls for Epstein and had incriminating photographs. They discussed his potential surrender at U.S. Attorney's office in New York in exchange for immunity from prosecution, but soon afterwards Brunel ceased all communications. According to victims rights attorney Bradley Edwards, Brunel met in person and talked for hours with J. Stanley Pottinger at the Boies Schiller Flexner office in New York on May 2, 2016. Brunel's attorney, Joseph Titone, told The Wall Street Journal that he advised Brunel to cooperate with authorities and cut ties with Epstein but said "he never did."

In 2019, it was revealed that Brunel was named in court documents from a civil suit by Giuffre against Maxwell. The documents were unsealed on 9 August 2019, a day before Epstein's death. In her memoir Nobody's Girl, Giuffre said she was raped and abused by Brunel on many occasions as a minor.

In 2022, Courtney Soerensen, who had previously made allegations about Brunel in 2019, alleged that in Spring of 1988, while working abroad in Paris as a 19-year old model, she was repeatedly sexually assaulted by Brunel and was "pimped out" to his friends, including Jeffrey Epstein. Soerensen claimed that Brunel had arranged for her go on a casting call to meet a movie producer known as "Jeffy" and his videographer in an apartment off the Champs-Élysées in Paris, and alleged that Epstein had sexually assaulted her while his videographer filmed the encounter before she was able to flee.

In 2026, a Brazilian woman referred to by the BBC as Ana alleged that in the early 2000s, she sought modeling work and was deceptively recruited by a Brazilian madame who took her documents, told her she owed money for photos and travel, and began pimping her out in São Paulo. Ana said the madame sent her to a luxury hotel to meet Epstein a few weeks after her 18th birthday. Epstein had an agreement with the madame to pay $10,000 for both his first visit with Ana (where she said Epstein had her undress while he touched himself), and to take Ana to Paris after their first meeting. The madame gave Ana's documents to Epstein, who then had Brunel arrange visas for her to travel to Paris and the US, under the guise of working for Karin Models, although the purpose of her travel was only to visit Epstein several times over a period of about four months before the visa was revoked.

=== Initial police investigation ===
After Epstein's arrest on 6 July 2019, Brunel disappeared. He was last seen in public on 5 July 2019 at a party at the Paris Country Club.

On 23 August 2019, two weeks after Epstein's death, the Paris prosecutor's office opened an investigation into rape and sexual assault of minors as well as criminal conspiracy in connection with the Epstein case, aiming "to uncover any offenses committed not only on national territory, but also abroad against French victims or perpetrators of French nationality." Several women recounted parties hosted by Brunel at the Paris apartment where the models were staying and described an atmosphere of prostitution and drugs, unhealthy for minors, and a "climate of sexual violence." Ten women interviewed by the prosecutor's office accused Brunel of rape, including of minors. They reported how they had been made to consume alcohol and drugs at Brunel's parties to the extent that they lost control of their faculties or even lost consciousness, and had been subjected to sexual penetration while incapacitated. Among them was Thysia Huisman, who came forward to report Brunel for spiking her drink and raping her in Paris in 1991 when she had just turned 18.

The prosecutor's announcement of the investigation named Brunel and referred to testimony given by a complainant in the US as well as to statements by two complainants in France. Two complainants stated that Brunel acted as a recruiter for Epstein, luring young girls from disadvantaged backgrounds to the United States with the prospect of modeling jobs. In September 2019, investigators searched Brunel's Paris home and the Karin Models office in Paris.

=== Custody and indictment ===
On 16 December 2020, Brunel was intercepted by police at Charles de Gaulle Airport in Paris, at the assistance of Matan Uziel, as he was about to board a flight to Dakar, Senegal. He was held in custody at La Santé Prison for questioning in relation to rape, sexual assault, criminal conspiracy, and human trafficking, with all of the allegations involving minors. The Paris prosecutors office said that Brunel was under investigation for having organized transport and arranged accommodation for young girls and young women on behalf of Jeffrey Epstein.

On 29 June 2021, Brunel was indicted for drugging and raping a 17-year-old girl in the 1990s. In September, a second complainant accused Brunel of drugging her drink and raping her in Paris. His lawyers maintained his innocence. Brunel was held in custody for 14 months while awaiting trial on charges of rape of minors and sexual harassment.

Le Monde reported that eleven women had "accused Brunel of sexual assault in that case, which was closed after he died by suicide" in the La Santé Prison in Paris, in February 2022.

=== Epstein Files release and second police investigation ===
In the 2026 release of the Epstein files, Brunel was listed in a 2019 document as one of the people "the FBI once called co-conspirators" of Epstein. In February 2026, the French authorities announced that they were re-examining Brunel's case, analysing the newly published documents for any information related to him as well as with a view to opening investigations into any suspected crimes involving French nationals.

== Death ==
On 19 February 2022, 75-year-old Brunel was found hanging in his cell at La Santé Prison. Brunel had made several suicide attempts before his death. An inquiry into his death concluded in March 2023 that he had died by suicide, with a prosecutor stating that, according to psychiatric experts, the suicide was a reaction to his indictment and incarceration, and that no criminal offence could be established. In a November 2022 report, an expert said Brunel was at a high risk for suicide following several acts of self-harm while in detention and was in a depressive state at the time of his death. No foul play was suspected in his death.

== Personal life ==
Brunel was married to Helen Hogberg, a Swedish model. Brunel and Hogberg moved to Ibiza where Brunel and several partners opened a bar and restaurant called El Mono Desnudo (The Naked Monkey). He was reportedly forced to leave the island on short notice. Hogberg divorced Brunel in 1979. In 1988, he married his girlfriend of two years, American model Roberta Chirko, the day before the 60 Minutes program aired. They also later divorced.

== See also ==
- MC2 Model Management
