= Zoë Brock =

Model and writer from New Zealand

Zoë Brock is a model and writer from New Zealand.

== Early years ==
Brock was born in 1974 in Christchurch, New Zealand, and emigrated to Melbourne, Australia, in 1986.

== Modelling and acting career ==
Brock started modelling when she was 14 years old. Her first work was with Vogue Australia. She has also worked for Vogue Italia, Elle, Cosmopolitan, L'Uomo Vogue, Vogue UK, French Vogue and Vogue USA. Brock later walked in Fashion Week shows in Europe and New York for designers including Giorgio Armani, Vivienne Westwood, Fendi, Fiorucci, Gianfranco Ferre, Thierry Mugler and Dolce & Gabbana. Her acting credits include She Spies and Going to California with Vince Vaughn.

== After acting ==
Brock delayed her acting career for several years after an encounter with Harvey Weinstein in 1997 and then quit acting and Hollywood altogether in 2003 shortly after seeing Weinstein in public. She moved to San Francisco, where she worked as a web designer and marketing manager in Silicon Valley. Brock relocated back to Australia to give birth to a child in 2017.

== #MeToo ==
Brock is one of the first women to come forward with claims of sexual violence that helped birth the MeToo movement. In October 2017, two days after the story broke in The New York Times, she published an article alleging that Harvey Weinstein had sexually assaulted her in 1997 while they were both in Cannes for the Cannes Film Festival. She and five other women filed a class action lawsuit against Weinstein alleging that The Weinstein Company was aware of his alleged sexual misconduct and was complicit in helping him cover up the behavior. In March 2018 Brock appeared as herself in the PBS Frontline episode "Weinstein". She also appeared in the BBC Panorama version.

In May 2018 the class action suit was amended to nine accusers.

== The Jeffrey Epstein scandal ==
Shortly after publishing her Weinstein article on Medium in October 2017, Brock wrote another article detailing her sexual harassment in 1992 at the hands of her French modelling agent Jean-Luc Brunel. Brunel is accused of sex-trafficking underage girls to Jeffrey Epstein and of exploiting, raping and drugging young models since he was first exposed by a CBS 60 Minutes episode that aired in 1988.

Multiple women and some men have come forward to try to help French and US police locate Brunel.
