= Warrior Dog Foundation =

Non profit organization

- Formation: 2013
- Type: non-profit organization
- Headquarters: Dallas, Texas
- Website: warriordogfoundation.org

Warrior Dog Foundation is a non-profit organization located in Cooper, Texas that was founded by former Navy SEAL Mike Ritland in 2013. It provides care and comfort to dogs that have completed their service supporting American troops. Its main goal is to give the dogs a place to live with dignity.

== Programs ==
The foundation operates a kennel facility where retired military working dogs receive ongoing physical and behavioral rehabilitation. It also works to educate the public on the role and contributions of military working dogs in U.S. armed forces operations. The foundation also trains other dogs to replace their predecessors on the battlefield, for families who want a pet and protection, and to work with the police.

== See also ==
- Animals in War Memorial
- Dogs in warfare
- Dickin Medal
- Examples of dogs that gained notability in war
- 1st Military Working Dog Regiment
- War Dog Memorial (Bristol Township, Pennsylvania)
