= MC2 Model Management =

International modeling agency

- Type: Private
- Industry: Modeling
- Founded: 2005; 21 years ago in Miami, U.S.
- Website: https://www.mc2mm.co.il/women

MC2 Model Management is an international modeling agency cofounded by French model agent Jean-Luc Brunel, with a $1 million line of credit provided by Jeffrey Epstein. The agency was established in Miami in 2005, renamed from Brunel's earlier agency Karin Models of America. The Miami operation was dissolved on September 27, 2019, though a branch affiliated with the agency continues to operate in Tel Aviv.

Ofer Raphaeli founded MC2 Model Management in 2000 in Israel. According to Ofer he claims to have met Jeffrey only twice in Miami, and worked at the New York location in 2004.

Brunel was arrested in December 2020 on charges of rape, sexual assault of minors, human trafficking, and participation in a criminal conspiracy. He died by suicide in a Paris prison cell in February 2022 while awaiting trial. MC2 has been the subject of extensive investigation into its role in Epstein's sex trafficking network, including its documented connections to the Victoria's Secret fashion brand.

== Background ==
Jean-Luc Brunel began his career as a model agent in Paris in the late 1970s, becoming head of the Karin Models agency in 1978. He claimed to have launched the careers of several prominent models of the era, including Christy Turlington, Rebecca Romijn, and Milla Jovovich, though other agents have disputed some of these attributions. Allegations of drugging and sexually assaulting models surfaced as early as 1988, when a CBS 60 Minutes investigation presented by Diane Sawyer aired accounts from several of his accusers. Despite the broadcast, Brunel's career continued without consequence. In 1995, he expanded Karin's operations to New York and Miami, and was briefly a minority partner at Next Management in New York.

Brunel and Jeffrey Epstein are believed to have met in the 1980s, with their relationship growing in the late 1990s. Between 2000 and 2005, Brunel flew on Epstein's private jet at least two dozen times. In 2005, Brunel transformed Karin's United States division into MC2 Model Management, with Epstein providing a $1 million line of credit, according to a sworn deposition by MC2's former bookkeeper, Maritza Vasquez. Vasquez testified that Epstein directly paid for the visas of models brought to the United States to work for the agency, and that girls housed in agency-controlled apartments in Miami Beach and Manhattan were transported to parties at Epstein's Palm Beach and Manhattan properties rather than working as professional models. She said MC2 was a financially unprofitable operation, stating that Epstein's involvement appeared to be motivated by access to the agency's models rather than commercial interest. MC2 lost an estimated $49 million between 2006 and 2015 according to an accounting firm.

MC2 first opened offices in Miami and New York, with a third branch subsequently established in Tel Aviv. Clients of MC2 reportedly included Nordstrom, Macy's Inc., Saks Fifth Avenue, Neiman Marcus, JCPenney Co., Kohl's Corporation, Target Corporation, Sears, and Belk.

On 27 September 2019, the Miami branch of MC2 was dissolved but the Tel Aviv branch remained active.

== Involvement in modeling contests ==
In 2011, Brunel served as a jury member at the "Baltic Beauty Contest 2011" in Latvia, organized by the Latvian modeling agency "Natalie". The contest, which drew around 12,000 participants from Latvia and neighboring countries, was won by a 14-year-old girl named Paula. The head of the Latvian agency, later stated he was unaware of any allegations against Brunel or his connection to Jeffrey Epstein at the time. Latvian television program De facto reported already in 2011 that Brunel's presence on the jury was controversial due to his alleged involvement in supplying underage girls to Epstein, and noted that the FBI had reopened an investigation into Brunel around that period.

The broadcast highlighted ongoing concerns within the Baltic modeling industry, including the unregulated status of modeling agencies in Latvia, the absence of an industry registry, and the risk of Latvian minors being exploited for sexual services abroad.
