= Waltz (disambiguation) =

The waltz is a ballroom and folk dance of Austrian origin. It is also a verb that means "to walk somewhere quickly and confidently".

Waltz may also refer to:

- International standard waltz, one of the five dances of the "Standard" category of the International Style ballroom dances

== Music ==
- Waltz (music), the kind of music to which one dances a waltz
- Waltz (EP), by Augie March, 1999
- "Waltz #2 (XO)", a song by Elliott Smith from XO
  - "Waltz #1", a song by Elliott Smith, also from XO
- "Waltz (Better Than Fine)" and "Waltz", two songs by Fiona Apple from Extraordinary Machine
- "Waltz", a song by the Cat Empire from Cities
- "Waltz", a song by Hale from Twilight
- "Waltz", a song by Suneohair

== Places in the United States ==
- Waltz Township, Wabash County, Indiana
- Waltz, Kentucky, an unincorporated community
- Waltz, Michigan, an unincorporated community

== Other uses ==
- Waltz (surname), a list of people
- "Waltz" (Star Trek: Deep Space Nine episode), a television episode
- The Waltz (Claudel), a sculpture by Camille Claudel
- Waltz, in juggling, a type of passing

== See also ==
- Walz
- The Last Waltz (disambiguation)
