= Senator Walz =

Senator Walz may refer to:

- Lynne Walz (fl. 2010s), Nebraska State Senate
- Norman Joseph Walz (1915–1984), Minnesota State Senate

== See also ==
- Brent Waltz (born 1973), Indiana State Senate
