= Ranchera =

Genre of traditional music of Mexico

- Stylistic origins: Corrido, Walz
- Cultural origins: Mexico
- Derivative forms: Ranchera walz, Bolero ranchero, Marcha ranchera

Other topics
- chilena; huapango; Jarabe Tapatío; Mexican zapateado; mariachi; Norteño; Regional Mexican; son mexicano; Tejano

Ranchera (pronounced [ranˈtʃeɾa]) or canción ranchera is a genre of traditional music of Mexico. It dates to before the years of the Mexican Revolution. Rancheras today are played in the vast majority of regional Mexican music styles. Drawing on rural traditional folk music, the ranchera developed as a symbol of a new national consciousness in reaction to the aristocratic tastes of the period.

== Definitions ==
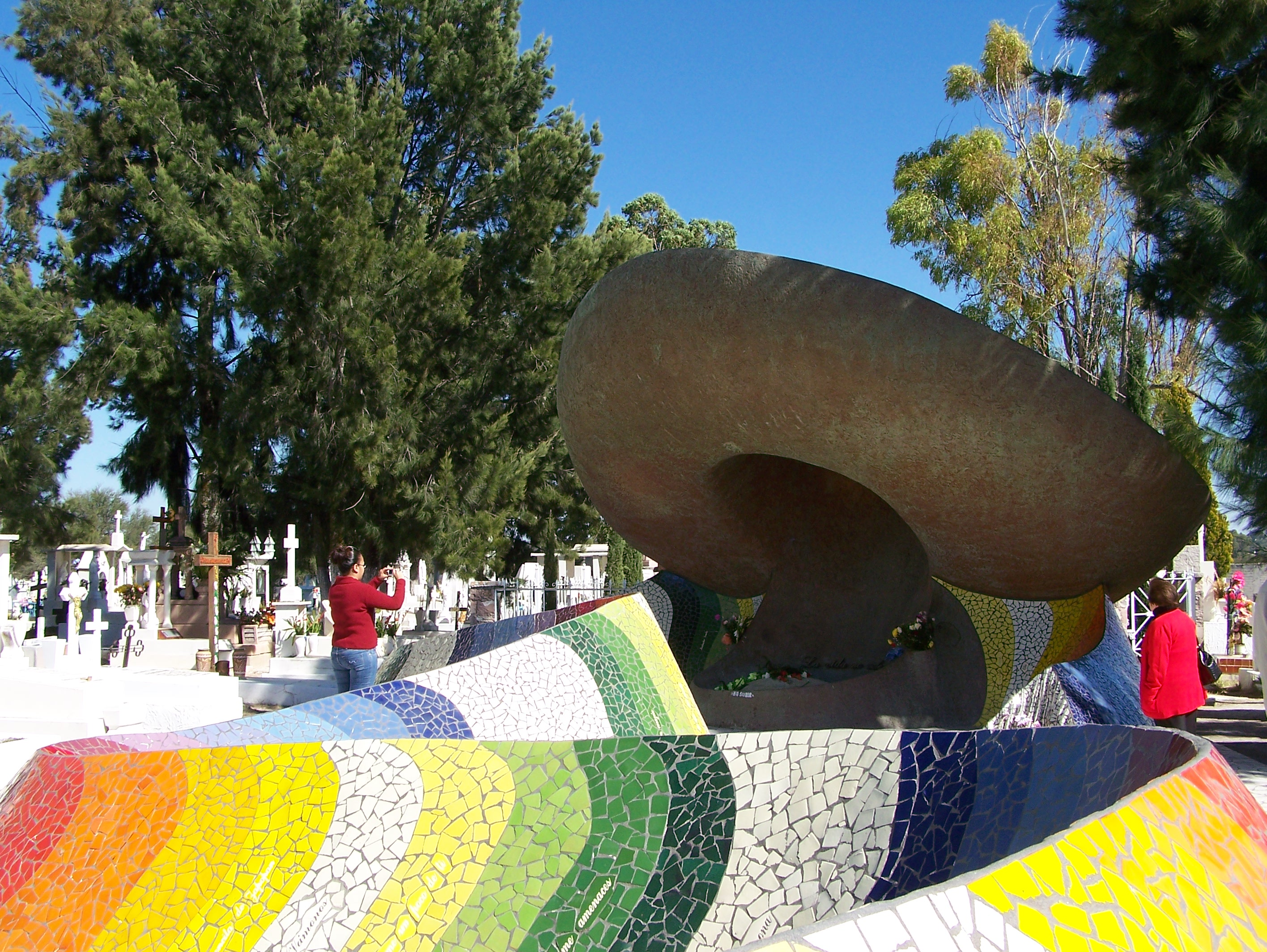
José Alfredo Jiménez's tomb in Dolores Hidalgo, Guanajuato, attracts visitors from around the world.

The word ranchera was derived from the word rancho because the songs originated on the ranches and in the countryside of rural Mexico.

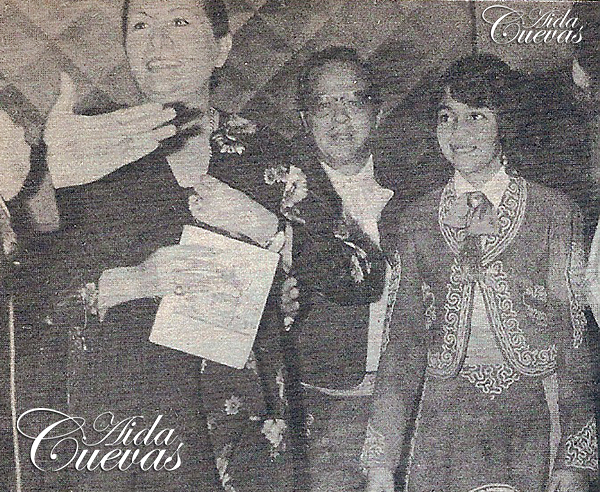
Lola Beltrán and Aida Cuevas 1976

Traditional themes in rancheras are about love, heartbreak, patriotism or nature.

Rhythms can have a meter in 2/4 (in slow tempo: ranchera lenta and faster tempo: ranchera marcha), 3/4 (ranchera vals), or 4/4 (bolero ranchero).

Songs are usually in a major key, and consist of an instrumental introduction, verse and refrain, instrumental section repeating the verse, and another verse and refrain, with a tag ending. Rancheras are also noted for the grito mexicano, a yell that is done at musical interludes within a song, either by the musicians and/or the listening audience.

Miguel Aceves Mejía

The normal musical pattern of rancheras is a–b–a–b. Rancheras usually begin with an instrumental introduction (a). The first lyrical portion then begins (b), with instrumental adornments interrupting the lines in between. The instruments then repeat the theme again, and then the lyrics may either be repeated or begin a new set of words. One also finds the form a–b–a–b–c–b used, in which the intro (a) is played, followed by the verse (b). This form is repeated, and then a refrain (c) is added, ending with the verse.

The most popular ranchera composers include Lucha Reyes, Cuco Sánchez, Antonio Aguilar, Juan Gabriel and José Alfredo Jiménez, who composed many of the best-known rancheras, with compositions totaling more than 1,000 songs, making him one of the most prolific songwriters in the history of western music.

Another closely related style of music is the corrido, which is often played by the same ensembles that regularly play rancheras. The corrido, however, is apt to be an epic story about heroes and villains, or the narrator's lifestyle.

== See also ==
- Rocío Dúrcal
- La Prieta Linda
- Vicente Fernández
