= EpsteinExposed =

Online database of Jeffrey Epstein files

- Website type: Open-source document database
- Owner: "Eric Keller" (pseudonym)
- Website: EpsteinExposed
- Commercial: No
- Registration: Optional
- Launched: February 8, 2026; 7 months ago
- Current status: Active
- Content license: Public domain source material

EpsteinExposed is a free, open-source online database that indexes and cross-references documents from the Jeffrey Epstein case files. The database contains documents, records about people of interest, flight records, and connections, and emails sourced from DOJ releases, court filings, FBI disclosures, and congressional investigations.

== History ==
The first released set of Epstein-related documents were related to Ghislaine Maxwell's civil litigation, and these were released through federal court dockets scattered across several states over a period of time, with some of them made accessible via PACER and other repositories. The second batch was folders of image files and videos, many previously released, without description inside folders on a Google drive. Following that, data sets were released as individual files without any context, many documents poorly scanned and redacted, and had file extensions that hid videos as PDF files. In response to the high volume and poor quality of the releases, different groups of journalists and engineers created tools to make the files truly searchable and meaningful. Some of the systems created are proprietary tools used specifically by news organizations, but others—like EpsteinExposed—are available to the public.

EpsteinExposed was created by a data engineer using the pseudonym "EricKeller2". In February 2026, Keller shared the project on Reddit, where it received approximately 5.5 million views. The site subsequently attracted hundreds of thousands of visitors.

Keller has stated that his motivation is partly rooted in his own experience as a survivor of childhood sexual abuse. The site is non-commercial, ad-free, and community-funded.

== Features ==
The database provides a searchable interface for documents released under the Epstein Files Transparency Act, as well as materials from the Jmail archives, the Maxwell case unsealing, and other public sources. By mid-March 2026, it had indexed 2.15 million documents, catalogued 1,500 people, and mapped thousands of connections.

EpsteinExposed focuses on making clearer the relationships between the pieces of data, cross-referencing people, wire transfers, flight records, and other details. Features include network graph visualization of connections, interactive flight log mapping, and artificial intelligence-powered document analysis and summarization.

Network graph

Forensic financial analysis

Dossiers

=== Sources ===
EpsteinExposed includes publicly available documents and reporting, and does not include private or leaked data.

Major public releases and leaks of Jeffrey Epstein–related documents (2024–2026) (Note: "Within EpsteinExposed scope" indicates whether a given tranche falls within the sourcing criteria stated by EpsteinExposed.com, which indexes publicly available court, congressional, and government records. Indexing of eligible tranches may be ongoing.)
Date	Source / Tranche	Volume	Within EpsteinExposed Scope
January 2024	Court-ordered unsealing in civil litigation	Varied by order; no single aggregate count available	Yes
August 27, 2025	Distributed Denial of Secrets – Ehud Barak email cache (via Handala)	100,000+ emails (2007–2016)	No (leaked/hacked material)
September 2, 2025	U.S. House Oversight Committee document release	33,295 pages	Yes
September 11, 2025	Bloomberg News email cache	~18,700 emails	No (independently acquired; not a public record)
November 14, 2025	Distributed Denial of Secrets – "Epstein Files" consolidated archive	439.88 GB	Partial (official government and court components within scope; leaked emails (Barak–Epstein) are not)
November 26, 2025	Distributed Denial of Secrets – "Epstein Emails"	About 18,700 emails and 2,200 attachments	No (leaked material)
December 19, 2025	DOJ "Data Sets 1–8"	~12,285 items (~125,575 pages) as of statutory deadline, per DOJ letter to federal court	Yes
January 30, 2026	DOJ "Data Sets 9–12"	3 million+ additional pages; 180,000 images; 2,000 videos (~3.5 million pages combined with prior releases)	Yes
March 5, 2026	DOJ sixth release (previously removed files)	~50,000 files	Yes

== See also ==
- List of people named in the Epstein files
