= Walz =

Walz is a surname of German origin derived from the name Walter. Notable people with the surname include:

- Barbra Walz (1950/1951–1990), American fashion photographer
- Carl E. Walz (born 1955), American astronaut
- Christian Walz (born 1978), Swedish musician
- C-Rayz Walz (born 1975), stage name of Waleed Shabazz, American rapper
- Dale Walz (1964–2024), American politician and police officer
- Ernst Christian Walz (1802–1857), German archaeologist
- Franz Walz (1885–1945), German fighter pilot
- Gottlob Walz (1881–1943), German diver
- Gwen Walz (born 1966), American civic leader and educator
- Hanna Walz (1918–1997), German politician
- Hans Walz (1883–1974), German merchant
- Janina Hettich-Walz (born 1996), German biathlete
- Jeff Walz (born 1971), American basketball coach
- John Walz (1844–1922), American sculptor
- Karl Walz (1900–1990), German politician
- Lynne Walz (born 1963), American State Senator
- Marcus Walz (born 1994), Spanish sprint canoeist
- Martha M. Walz (born 1961), American politician
- Mary Beth Walz, American politician
- Norman Joseph Walz (1915–1984), American State Senator
- Owen Walz (born 2004), American soccer player
- Riley Walz (born 2002), American software engineer and artist
- Stefan Walz (born 1963), Swiss actor
- Tim Walz (born 1964), American politician, Governor of Minnesota and 2024 vice presidential nominee
- Tommy Walz (born 1945), American politician
- Udo Walz (1944–2020), German celebrity hairdresser
- Wes Walz (born 1970), Canadian ice hockey player and coach
- Zack Walz (born 1976), American football player

== See also ==
- Coach Walz (disambiguation)
- Waltz (disambiguation)
- Walz v. Tax Commission of the City of New York, a landmark 1970 United States Supreme Court decision
- WALZ, American radio station in Maine
