= Jmail =

Browser-based archive of the Epstein files

- Screenshot of the website in November 2025
- Website type: Archive
- Creators: Riley Walz, Luke Igel
- Website: jmail.world
- Registration: None
- Users: ≥18.4 million
- Launched: November 2025; 1 year ago
- Current status: Online

Jmail is a browser-based archive of the Epstein files, which were released by the United States House Committee on Oversight and Government Reform under the Epstein Files Transparency Act (EFTA). The website was initially stylized in a Gmail-based interface, and later added the interfaces of other sites (Facebook, Google Drive, YouTube, Spotify, Google Photos, Google Flights, Amazon, Wikipedia), with the goal of making the EFTA releases easier to access and browse.

By late February 2026, the website is projected to have amassed 450 million visits.

== Content ==
The site is from the viewpoint of financier and sex offender Jeffrey Epstein's personal email inboxes, jeevacation@gmail.com and jeeproject@yahoo.com, and contains text conversations up to 2019. Jmail incorporates "Jemini", an artificial intelligence parody of Gemini that searches through EFTA text releases in order to counter the DOJ's claims that searching through the releases is impractical due to "technical limitations". The site uses Reducto to parse and extract text from each EFTA document. A "people" tab highlights prominent individuals mentioned in the emails.

== Development ==
Jmail was started by Riley Walz, an internet artist, and Luke Igel, co-founder of Kino AI. The website was first unveiled via a Twitter post by Walz, which noted that "we cloned Gmail, except you're logged in as Epstein and can see his emails". Igel stated that "I think the craziest, most meta [part] is that you're reading his private emails of him trying to clean up his own reputation". The site was publicly launched in November 2025; it took five hours in total to develop. Later, Walz and Igel's friends developed JPhotos, an image database of EFTA releases; JFlights, a flight tracking website of Epstein's flights; and Jamazon, a website similar to Jmail that tracks Epstein's Amazon orders. Drop Site News later announced a collaboration with the Jmail team to help add and vet content to the archive. In February 2026, the developers added Jwiki, a Wikipedia parody detailing people associated with Epstein. According to the project's official credits page, different additional contributors for different parts of the project include Diego Rodriguez, Cora Kyler, Melissa Du, Ricardo de Arruda, Aidan Dunlap, Advait Paliwal, Molly Cantillon, Will DePue, Jason Liu, and Watcher.

== See also ==
- Enron Corpus
- EpsteinExposed
- Lists of archives
