= Coach Walz (disambiguation) =

Coach Walz is a nickname for Tim Walz (born 1964), an American politician and former football coach.

Coach Walz may also refer to:

- Jeff Walz (born 1971), American basketball coach
- Wes Walz (born 1970), Canadian former hockey player and coach

== See also ==
- Walz, a surname, including a list of people
