= Epstein files =

Files on Jeffrey Epstein and his affiliates

A contact book made public during the Epstein Files Phase 1 release in 2025, with the majority of its content redacted

The Epstein files are a partially released collection of millions of documents, images, videos, and emails related to the activities of American financier and convicted child sex offender Jeffrey Epstein, including his social circle of public figures, politicians, and celebrities. The files include documents collected as evidence in the criminal cases against Epstein and his associates, stored as over 300 gigabytes of data, alongside other media, in the FBI's Sentinel case management system. They include Epstein's contact book, flight logs of his planes, and court documents. Many of the records and files belong to Epstein's estate, which is run by lawyer Darren Indyke and accountant Richard Kahn.

United States president Donald Trump, under his second term beginning in 2025, and Republican House speaker Mike Johnson repeatedly sought to prevent the release of the Epstein files via congressional authorization from a bipartisan bill proposed by representatives Thomas Massie and Ro Khanna. In November 2025, the U.S. House of Representatives passed the Epstein Files Transparency Act, and the U.S. Senate unanimously approved it, with President Trump signing the bill into law the next day. The following month, the U.S. Department of Justice released a relatively small number of files, leading to criticism from both major parties in the US. Trump had previously floated the idea of releasing the files during his 2024 presidential campaign; he later said that controversies surrounding the files were fabricated by members of the Democratic Party.

In January 2026, an additional 3 million pages were released, including 2,000 videos and 180,000 images. While the Department of Justice acknowledged that a total of 6 million pages might qualify as files required to be released, it stated that the January 30 release would be the final one, and that it had met its legal obligations. The released files mentioned a number of public figures, and led to increased scrutiny of their activities. Individuals whose names have shown up frequently in the files include: Epstein's assistant Lesley Groff, accountant Richard Kahn, Donald Trump and his wife Melania, lawyer Darren Indyke, sex trafficker and socialite Ghislaine Maxwell, and modeling agent and alleged sex trafficker Jean-Luc Brunel.

As of February 2026, as well as Epstein and Maxwell, three people have had criminal investigations launched into them due to their ties to Epstein, with one resulting in criminal charges and the others resulting in arrests thus far: former Norwegian prime minister Thorbjørn Jagland, who has been charged with aggravated corruption; Andrew Mountbatten-Windsor; and British politician Peter Mandelson.

== Background ==
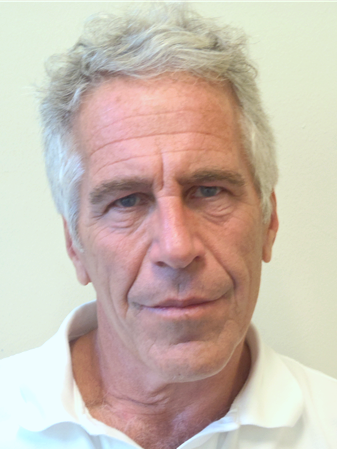
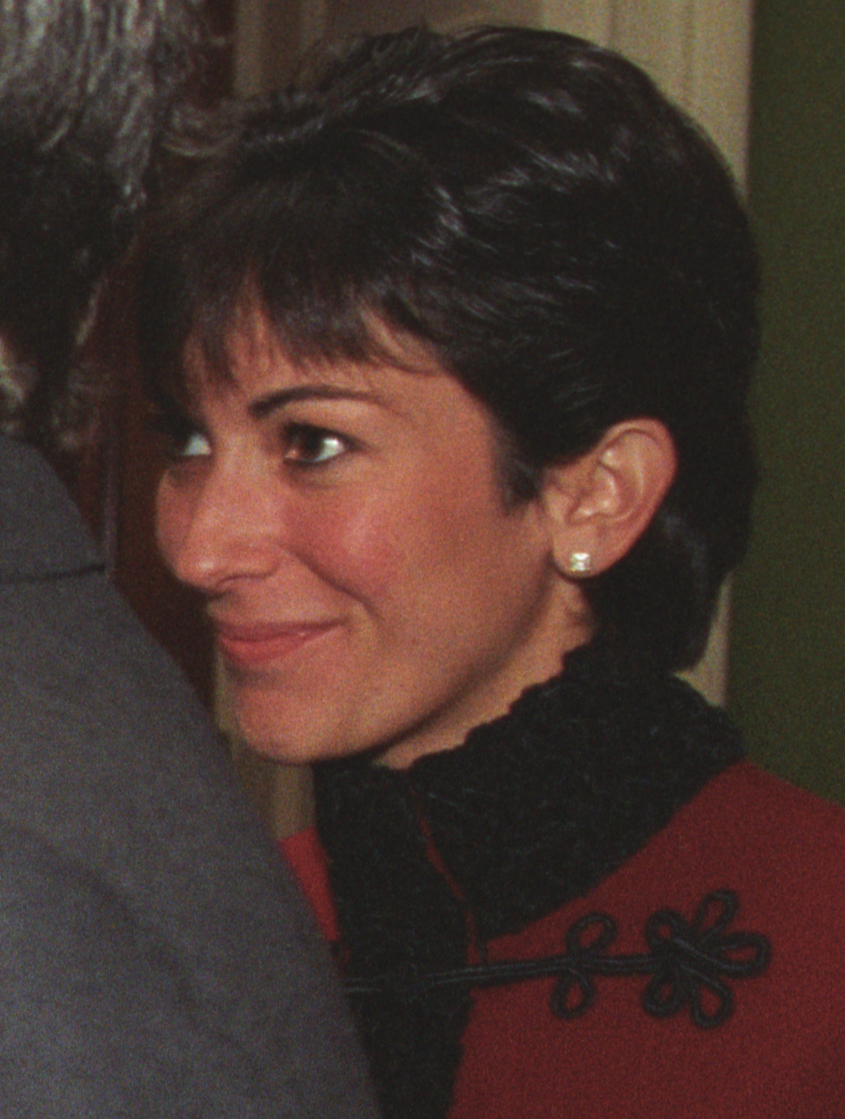
Jeffrey Epstein (left) and Ghislaine Maxwell (right).

In 1996, Maria Farmer reported to the FBI that Epstein had "stolen" naked photos she had of her underage siblings, but says that she did not hear back. The Florida Palm Beach Police Department began investigating Epstein after a woman reported that her 14-year-old stepdaughter had been taken to Epstein's home and paid to strip and massage Epstein. Following an investigation, the FBI identified at least 35 girls with a similar history between 2002 and 2005. Epstein was indicted and pleaded guilty to soliciting a 17 year old minor for prostitution in 2008. He was registered as a sex offender and sentenced to 18 months in prison.

In 2018, an article in the Miami Herald critiqued his plea deal and sentence as lenient, and interviewed victims who shared their experiences with Epstein between 2002 and 2005. Virginia Giuffre alleged that Epstein had been operating a trafficking ring that "lent out" girls to other powerful men.

The media coverage prompted New York federal prosecutors to reexamine the case and investigate potential additional Epstein offences between 2002 and 2005. Investigators corroborated the victims stories of abuse. According to declassified 2019 FBI investigation findings released in 2026, other victims did not corroborate Giuffre's specific allegation that Epstein had operated a trafficking "ring" that "lent out" girls to other powerful men. Evidence seized from Epstein's homes also only implicated Epstein and his accomplice, Ghislaine Maxwell. Epstein was arrested in July 2019, on charges of sex trafficking minors between 2002 and 2005 in New York and Florida. He died of suicide in prison while awaiting trial.

Epstein cultivated a social circle of public figures that included politicians and celebrities. This has fuelled conspiracy theories that Epstein kept a "client list" to whom he allegedly trafficked young girls, that he used this to blackmail clients, and that these clients later killed him. These theories have been disseminated widely after his 2019 death, including by Donald Trump. Under Trump's second administration, FBI investigators did not find evidence for the specific allegation of a "ring" in which Epstein "lent out" girls, nor evidence of a "client list".

== Contents ==
=== 2007 draft indictment ===
The FBI began investigating Epstein in 2006, following reports that he had been paying underage girls for sex in his Florida mansion. In 2007, federal prosecutors prepared a draft indictment consisting of 32 counts against Epstein and two of his employees for enticement of minors and sex trafficking. Ultimately, U.S. attorney Alexander Acosta signed off on a deal that allowed Epstein to avoid federal prosecution; Epstein instead pleaded guilty to a state charge of soliciting prostitution from someone under age 18 and received an 18-month jail sentence. No charges were presented against his employees. The draft indictment described Epstein as "an extremely high flight risk and, from information we have received, a continued danger to the community based upon his continued enticement of underage girls." It described many crimes that were ultimately not prosecuted in favor of Epstein's plea deal.

=== 2008 non-prosecution agreement ===
The Justice Department's releases under the Transparency Act were organized into twelve data sets. Data Set 9, published in January 2026, contained email evidence, including private correspondence between Epstein and prominent individuals and internal departmental correspondence concerning the 2008 non-prosecution agreement, which granted broad federal immunity to Epstein and his potential co-conspirators.

=== 2019 documents about investigation of alleged co-conspirators ===
Emails from 2019 show that shortly after Epstein's 2019 arrest, FBI agents discussed contacting Ghislaine Maxwell and 9 other alleged co-conspirators, including Lesley Groff, Darren Indyke, Richard Kahn (accountant), Jean-Luc Brunel, and Les Wexner, in order to serve them with grand jury summonses. The emails do not name some of the alleged co-conspirators, but note the city or state each is in. An FBI agent noted in the email that "3 have been located in FL [Florida] and served [grand jury] subpoenas; 1 in Boston, 1 in NYC [New York City], and 1 in CT [Connecticut] were located and served."

Federal prosecutors in the Southern District of New York produced an 86-page memo called "Investigation into Potential Co-Conspirators of Jeffrey Epstein" that was sent to US Attorney Geoffrey Berman on December 19, 2019. The memo contains statements of 24 women who reported being abused by Epstein as minors and 14 who reported being abused by Epstein as adults. One of the women told prosecutors that Epstein had told her to give massages to two men in 2011 or 2012, and that one of the men tried to sexually assault her and the other man "forced her to touch his genitals and then raped [her]." The FBI has not commented on whether or not the men were investigated.

=== Investigation documents ===
One document detailed a diagram of Epstein's inner circle, including Maxwell, his lawyer Darren Indyke, and his accountant Richard Kahn. The undated diagram also showed Jean-Luc Brunel, a French model agent with longtime ties to Epstein who faced rape charges in France before dying by suicide in a French jail in 2022. The document listed other close associates including Epstein's personal chef, pilots, and Peter Listerman, a model scout described in the file as a "subject/witness" and model "matchmaker". It also listed Les Wexner, the billionaire business magnate who employed Epstein as a money manager and has said he severed ties with Epstein in 2007.

While the diagram indicated that the DOJ had been investigating people close to Epstein for potential involvement, other individuals identified were known Epstein employees, none of whom were charged. The Justice Department redacted the names and photographs of five other individuals on the diagram, including Maxwell's assistant and four Epstein employees, one of whom was listed as a "girlfriend/employee". Victims and advocates criticized the Justice Department for what they characterized as heavy but inconsistent redactions of names and details throughout the released documents.

=== Social connections and meetings ===
The release detailed Epstein's associations with numerous prominent individuals. The documents further illustrated how Epstein's relationships with powerful figures persisted even after he became a convicted sex offender in 2008, contradicting or undermining years of public denials from some associates.

=== UK government leaks ===
The files contain market sensitive and secret information stemming from the heart of the UK Government, which appears to have been sent to Epstein by Peter Mandelson. One email sent to Epstein from a redacted address in August 2009, appeared to reveal Prime Minister Gordon Brown's pseudonym, "John Pond", along with Brown's secure email address.

=== Manipulation of Epstein's article on Wikipedia ===
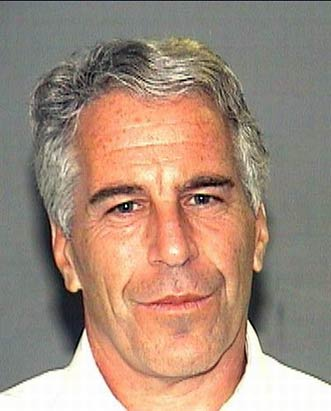
The 2006 mugshot that Al Seckel tried to replace on Wikipedia

The files contain a late 2010 email by Al Seckel to Epstein in which he mentions Epstein's mug shot on Wikipedia, and that he was trying to replace it with a friendly picture of Epstein, in addition to removing the term "sex offender" from Epstein's article on Wikipedia at a time when Epstein was trying to rebuild his public image after being released from jail in July 2009.

=== Epstein's death ===
The released files included emails between investigators regarding Epstein's death, including an investigator's observation that his final communication did not appear to be a suicide note. Multiple investigations have determined that Epstein's death was a suicide. The records also detailed a tactic that jail staffers used to evade media gathered outside the Metropolitan Correctional Center when Epstein's body was removed: staff used boxes and sheets to create what appeared to be a body and loaded it into a white van labeled as belonging to the Office of the Chief Medical Examiner. Reporters followed the van when it departed the jail, not knowing that Epstein's actual body had been loaded into a black vehicle, which left "unnoticed", according to the interview notes.

=== Financial records ===
Epstein signed a 32-page trust two days before his death. The document names 40 beneficiaries of his $600 million estate. He left $100 million to his girlfriend, Belarusian dentist Karyna Shuliak. He left $50 million to his personal lawyer Darren Indyke, and $25 million to his accountant Richard Kahn. Indyke and Kahn were named as co-executors of Epstein's estate.

He left Ghislaine Maxwell and his brother, Mark Epstein, $10 million each, and $5 million to Harvard math professor Martin Nowak. It is unclear how much the beneficiaries received, as the estate has shrunk due to taxes and payments to victims. At least one named beneficiary, Mark Epstein, has said he was unaware of being named as a beneficiary to the estate.

Kahn sat for a closed-door deposition before the House Oversight Committee on March 11, 2026.

== Redaction failures ==
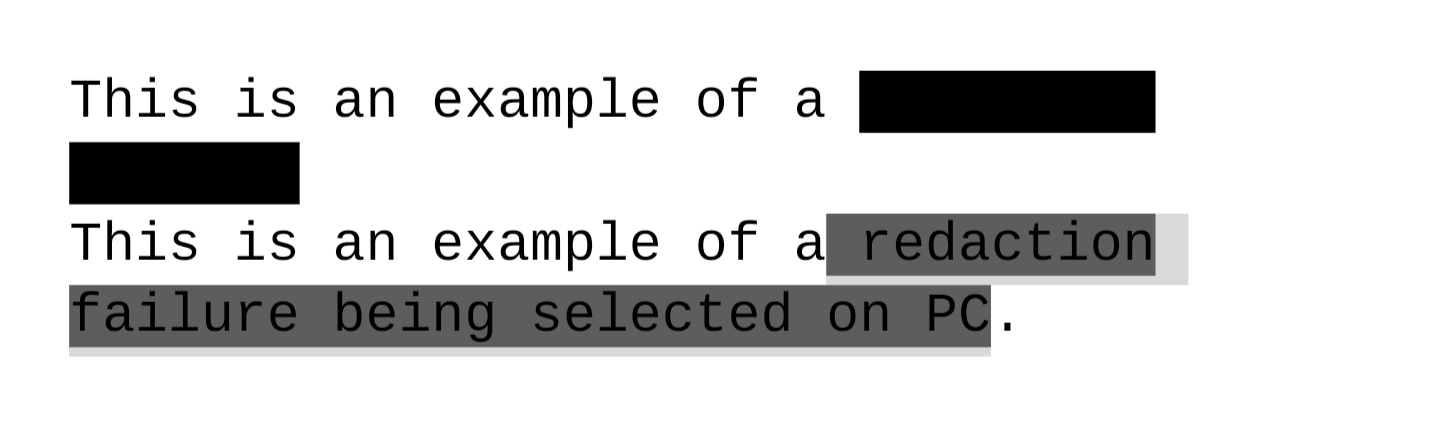
An example of redaction failure, which are seen in some of the Epstein files.

Faulty redaction techniques in the December 2025 release allowed members of the public to recover blacked-out content, revealing information that officials had intended to withhold from public viewing. Social media users discovered that blacked-out text in certain documents could be revealed by copying and pasting it into another application; the flaw traced back to a 2021 court filing by the Virgin Islands attorney general's office in a civil racketeering case, which the Justice Department had incorporated into its release. At least 550 pages in the initial December release were entirely blacked out, including a 255-page series of consecutive documents and a 119-page grand jury transcript. Among the recovered content was an unverified FBI tip alleging that Trump had witnessed the killing and disposal of an infant born to a 13-year-old trafficking victim.

The January 2026 release drew further criticism over redaction failures. The Justice Department published dozens of unredacted nude images showing young women or possibly teenagers with their faces visible; the images were largely removed after The New York Times began notifying the department. Attorneys for survivors said the names of victims who had never been publicly linked to Epstein appeared unredacted in the files. A Wall Street Journal review found that at least 43 victims' full names were exposed, including more than two dozen who were minors when they were abused; some names appeared over 100 times, and home addresses were visible in keyword searches.

Brad Edwards and Brittany Henderson, attorneys who had provided the Justice Department with a list of 350 victims on December 4 to ensure their names would be redacted, said the department failed to perform a basic keyword search to verify its redaction process; Edwards said there were "literally thousands of mistakes". One of the victims, Anouska de Georgiou, who had testified against Ghislaine Maxwell, said her driver's license was among the exposed materials and accused the government of "a profound disregard for the safety, protection, and well-being of victims".

The Department of Justice established an email inbox for victims to report redaction errors and said it would remove affected documents pending correction. Attorneys Jennifer Freeman and Sigrid McCawley criticized the handling of the release; Freeman called the redactions "ham-fisted" and accused the department of "hiding the names of perpetrators while exposing survivors". Department officials acknowledged that many records in the files were duplicates; reviewers appeared to have applied different standards when redacting names and other identifying information, with some documents showing a name left exposed in one copy but redacted in another.

On February 1, 2026, attorneys representing more than 200 alleged victims asked federal judges Richard Berman and Paul Engelmayer to order the immediate takedown of the Justice Department's Epstein Files website, calling the release "the single most egregious violation of victim privacy in one day in United States history". Deputy Attorney General Todd Blanche defended the department's procedures, saying redaction errors affected "about .001%" of all materials and that the department moved quickly to fix mistakes when notified.

== Position of Trump administration ==
During the 2024 U.S. presidential election campaign, Donald Trump and his allies pledged to release files related to Jeffrey Epstein held by the federal government. Trump stated in interviews that he would "probably" make additional Epstein records public, while allies including JD Vance and Donald Trump Jr. accused the Biden administration of concealing a list of Epstein's clients. After taking office, Attorney General Pam Bondi announced in February 2025 that she was reviewing Epstein-related material at President Trump's direction, and the FBI undertook an extensive review of approximately 100,000 records.

In July 2025, the U.S. Department of Justice (DOJ) released a memo concluding that no "client list" existed in the Epstein files, that no credible evidence supported claims Epstein had blackmailed prominent individuals, and that his death was a suicide. The announcement drew criticism from Trump supporters and Democratic lawmakers alike. Reporting by The Wall Street Journal and The New York Times subsequently revealed that Bondi had informed Trump in May that his name appeared in the files alongside "unverified hearsay", and that officials had advised against public disclosure. Trump characterized the files as falsified documents created by political opponents and filed a defamation lawsuit against the Wall Street Journal over its coverage. On November 19, 2025, Trump signed the Epstein Files Transparency Act, which Congress passed to mandate release of DOJ records related to Epstein. The signing took place without reporters present.

=== Trump's relationship with Epstein ===
Trump, in 2019, talks about his relationship with Epstein.

Trump and Epstein were acquainted from the late 1980s through about the mid-2000s. In a 2002 interview with New York magazine, Trump called Epstein a "terrific guy" who "likes beautiful women as much as I do, and many of them are on the younger side". Their relationship cooled in the early 2000s, with commonly cited reasons including disputes over employees and a 2004 real estate deal in Palm Beach, Florida, in which Trump outbid Epstein on an oceanfront mansion. In 2003, Trump contributed a letter to a bound album of birthday greetings given to Epstein on his 50th birthday; The Wall Street Journal reported the letter contained suggestive content, which Trump denied writing. In October 2007, Trump revoked Epstein's membership at Mar-a-Lago.

=== Campaign promises (2024) ===
During the Biden administration, Trump allies, including Kash Patel, promoted claims that the FBI was withholding an Epstein "client list" and urged its release. In a speech at the Turning Point Action convention in June 2024, Donald Trump Jr. accused the Biden administration of keeping the list secret to protect pedophiles; in October, JD Vance said "we need to release the Epstein list". Trump, despite having brought up a connection between Epstein and Bill Clinton at the 2015 Conservative Political Action Conference, rarely mentioned the Epstein files during this period; yet, he did not refute his allies' claims. On two occasions during his 2024 presidential campaign, Donald Trump pledged to release the Epstein files. In a June 2024 interview with Fox News, when asked whether he would declassify them, Trump responded, "Yeah, yeah, I would." The clip was shared by an official Trump campaign account on Twitter. The unedited answer aired later shows Trump saying he was not sure he would because "you don't want to affect people's lives if it's phony stuff in there, because it's a lot of phony stuff with that whole world". In a September 2024 interview with Lex Fridman, Trump stated he would have "no problem" releasing additional Epstein files and would "probably" make the client list public.

=== Initial releases and FBI review (February–May 2025) ===
U.S. Attorney General Pam Bondi was asked on February 21, 2025, by Fox News journalist John Roberts whether the Justice Department would publish "the list of Jeffrey Epstein's clients", and Bondi replied: "It's sitting on my desk right now to review. That's been a directive by President Trump. I'm reviewing that." On February 27, she released documents that contained no significant new information. Faced with outcry from a disappointed public, Bondi demanded that FBI Director Kash Patel provide the extensive material she had originally requested from him. Michael Seidel, the section chief of the FBI's Record/Information Dissemination Section, objected to Bondi's order and was forced to resign. The FBI worked on Epstein records for two weeks during late March, according to Senator Dick Durbin. He later wrote:

[Bondi] pressured the FBI to put approximately 1,000 personnel ... on 24-hour shifts to review approximately 100,000 Epstein-related records in order to produce more documents that could then be released on an arbitrarily short deadline. This effort ... was haphazardly supplemented by hundreds of FBI New York Field Office personnel, many of whom lacked the expertise to identify statutorily-protected information regarding child victims and child witnesses or properly handle FOIA requests. My office was told that these personnel were instructed to "flag" any records in which President Trump was mentioned.

In the documents, the FBI found dozens of high-profile names, including Trump's. A unit of FOIA officers, citing exemptions in FOIA law, redacted Trump's name because, although he was then a sitting president, he had been a private citizen when the 2006 federal investigation into Epstein began. Lawyer and law professor Alan Dershowitz said in an interview with Sean Spicer on March 19, 2025, that he knew the names of individuals on such a list and unreleased files relating to Epstein, adding that "I know why they're being suppressed. I know who's suppressing them" and that he was "bound by confidentiality from a judge and cases, and I can't disclose what I know." Dershowitz had been part of the legal team that negotiated the non-prosecution agreement for Epstein, which was executed in September 2007.

In May, Bondi informed Trump that his name appeared in the Epstein files. She also said that the files contained "unverified hearsay" about Trump and others, child pornography and identifying information on Epstein's victims. As such, officials advised that the files should not be disclosed. White House Communications Director Steven Cheung denied reports that Trump was advised not to release the files, and Bondi said that "As part of our routine briefing, we made the President aware of the findings". Shortly thereafter, Bondi canceled her appearance at CPAC's International Summit Against Human Trafficking, citing a torn cornea. According to Politico, "[f]ollowing the reported briefing in May, Trump appears to have sought to narrow the government's public disclosures to avoid releasing information." On May 18, Patel and Deputy FBI Director Dan Bongino told Fox News that Epstein had died by suicide. On June 6, the Joe Rogan Experience aired an interview with Kash Patel, who said of the Epstein matter, "We've reviewed all the information, and the American public is going to get as much as we can release. He killed himself. ... Do you really think I wouldn't give that [video evidence] to you, if it existed?"

=== DOJ memo and administration response (July–November 2025) ===
President Donald Trump and Attorney General Pam Bondi on Jeffrey Epstein, July 8, 2025

On July 6, 2025, Axios reported that the Department of Justice and FBI had concluded in a two-page memo that no evidence existed that Epstein kept a "client list", blackmailed prominent individuals, or was murdered; the memo also affirmed the medical examiner's finding that Epstein died by suicide. The DOJ publicly released the memo on July 7, stating it "did not uncover evidence that could predicate an investigation against uncharged third parties" and would not release further Epstein-related documents. When asked what Bondi had meant in February when she said Epstein material was "on her desk", White House Press Secretary Karoline Leavitt said Bondi had been referring to "the entirety of all of the paperwork" related to Epstein's crimes rather than any specific client list; Bondi offered a similar clarification at a cabinet meeting the following day.

The administration's position drew criticism from across the political spectrum. Democratic representatives challenged the findings, while right-wing activists and influencers—including the Hodgetwins, Alex Jones, Rogan O'Handley, and Liz Wheeler—expressed skepticism. Bondi faced particular criticism from many in the MAGA movement. Podcaster Joe Rogan called the administration's reversal a "line in the sand", particularly for supporters who had backed Trump based on promised transparency. At a July 9 White House meeting that included Bondi, Dan Bongino, Kash Patel, and chief of staff Susie Wiles, Bongino and Patel were reportedly confronted over the memo; Bongino subsequently considered resigning. On August 18, Bondi and Patel announced that Missouri Attorney General Andrew Bailey would share the deputy FBI director role with Bongino, with Bailey sworn in on September 15. Some figures supported the administration's account that further disclosure was unnecessary, including Epstein's former attorney David Schoen, who had helped negotiate a 2008 plea deal.

Donald Trump
@realDonaldTrump

Their new SCAM is what we will forever call the Jeffrey Epstein Hoax, and my PAST supporters have bought into this 'bullshit,' hook, line, and sinker. [...] Let these weaklings continue forward and do the Democrats work, don't even think about talking of our incredible and unprecedented success, because I don't want their support anymore!

July 16, 2025

Beginning in mid-July, Trump characterized the Epstein files as falsified documents created by political opponents including the Biden administration, Barack Obama, and Hillary Clinton. On July 16, the Justice Department fired Maurene Comey, the federal prosecutor who had prosecuted Epstein; she is the daughter of James Comey, whom Trump had fired as FBI Director in 2017. On July 17, the day The Wall Street Journal reported that Trump had written a letter included in a book celebrating Epstein's 50th birthday 22 years earlier, Trump announced on Truth Social that he had instructed Bondi to seek court approval to release "any and all pertinent Grand Jury testimony", calling the ongoing attention a "SCAM, perpetuated by the Democrats". Bondi replied that she was "ready to move the court tomorrow". Legal observers noted the transcripts were not expected to contain significant new information and later reporting revealed that the White House was merely attempting to appear that they wanted the transcripts released, when they knew it was very unlikely to happen.

The following day, Trump sued the Journal—including two reporters, owner Rupert Murdoch, and parent companies Dow Jones and News Corp—for defamation and libel. On July 21, the White House removed a Journal reporter from the press pool for Trump's Scotland trip.

The Justice Department's requests to unseal grand jury materials were denied by federal judges. On July 23, Judge Robin Rosenberg ruled she could not grant a request for Florida grand jury documents based solely on "extensive public interest" outside of a legal proceeding, ordering instead that a new case be opened. Ghislaine Maxwell's attorneys opposed disclosure, calling it "a broad intrusion into grand jury secrecy" given Maxwell's remaining "legal options" and "due process rights". On August 8, the DOJ expanded its request to include grand jury exhibits in both the Maxwell and Epstein cases. Judge Paul Engelmayer denied the Maxwell request on August 11, ruling that the administration's "entire premise—that the Maxwell grand jury materials would bring to light meaningful new information about Epstein's and Maxwell's crimes, or the Government's investigation into them—is demonstrably false"; he characterized the government's public explanations as "disingenuous". Judge Richard Berman later denied a similar request for Epstein case materials.

Deputy Attorney General Todd Blanche met with Ghislaine Maxwell on July 24 and 25 at the U.S. attorney's office in Tallahassee. The Justice Department released the interview transcript and audio recording on August 22. Maxwell, having been sentenced to 20 years, was incarcerated at FCI Tallahassee at the time of the interviews. She was given limited immunity in the interviews, meaning that her answers to her interviewers' questions cannot be used against her. Blanche is Trump's personal lawyer and his political appointee. The previous year, Blanche had referred to Maxwell's lawyer, David Oscar Markus, as a "friend".

Maxwell told Blanche: "I certainly never witnessed the President in any of — I don't recall ever seeing him in his [Epstein's] house, for instance. I actually never saw the president in any type of massage setting. I never witnessed the President in any inappropriate setting in any way. The President was never inappropriate with anybody." CNN noted that Maxwell lied about her own crimes and the crimes of Epstein in the interview, and that she appeared to be attempting to flatter Trump with statements such as "I admire his extraordinary achievement in becoming the president now" and "I like him, and I've always liked him." Regarding Maxwell's credibility during the two-day interview, Blanche told CNN on September 17 it would be "impossible" for him to assess it, since "to determine whether a witness is credible takes weeks and weeks and weeks". He added: "It's really up to the American people to determine if they believe that her answers were credible". George Conway remarked that "Todd Blanche's questioning of Ghislaine Maxwell was either (a) completely incompetent; or (b) intentionally crafted not to elicit facts incriminating Trump." Blanche responded: "When I interviewed Maxwell, law enforcement didn't have the materials Epstein's estate hid for years and only just provided to Congress."

On July 25, when a CNN reporter asked Trump whether he planned to pardon Maxwell, he answered noncommittally: "I'm allowed to do it, but it's something I haven't thought about." On August 1, the Bureau of Prisons confirmed that, following the interview, Maxwell was transferred to Federal Prison Camp, Bryan, in Bryan, Texas, a minimum security facility with dormitory-style housing generally considered less unpleasant than other federal prisons. In November, she was reportedly receiving special privileges and planning to apply for commutation of her sentence; the whistleblower was fired from the prison. Annie Farmer, who has made accusations against Epstein and Maxwell, told CNN's Kaitlan Collins: "Even learning that the DOJ would be meeting with her [Maxwell] was extremely disturbing. ... with this prison transfer, I think it again feels like she is getting preferential treatment ... and it's really worrying to us about what might be coming next." On August 23, Giuffre's family responded to the transcript of the Maxwell–Blanche interview, telling CBS that Maxwell's statements were "in direct contradiction" with her "conviction for child sex trafficking" and that Blanche had "never challenged [her] about her court-proven lies". The family said that the Justice Department had thereby communicated "that child sex trafficking is acceptable and will be rewarded".

On September 4, 2025, political activist James O'Keefe, founder of the far-right group Project Veritas, posted a secret recording with DOJ acting Deputy Chief of Special Operations Joseph Schnitt. In the recording, Schnitt acknowledges the existence of the Epstein files, saying there are "thousands and thousands of pages of files" and that "they'll redact every Republican or conservative person in those files, leave all the liberal, Democratic people in those files". Schnitt stated that Maxwell's transfer to a minimum-security prison was "against [Federal Bureau of Prisons] policy because she's a convicted sex offender" and that "they're offering her something to keep her mouth shut". He also described Bondi as "a yes person" and that she "wants whatever Trump wants". In response to the recording, Schnitt stated that he had no idea he was being recorded, and said he met the undercover O'Keefe reporter on Hinge. He said his comments were based on what he "learned in the media" and not from the DOJ. In response, the DOJ asserted Schnitt's statements were false, saying that "Joseph Schnitt had no role in the Department's internal review of Epstein materials" and posted an iPhone screenshot of an email Schnitt sent to his superiors describing the recordings as happening over two dates in August 2025. As late as November 14, 2025, Trump continued to assert that the files were falsified documents created by political opponents, including the Biden administration, Barack Obama, and Hillary Clinton, referring to the matter as a "Democrat hoax".

== Congressional action ==
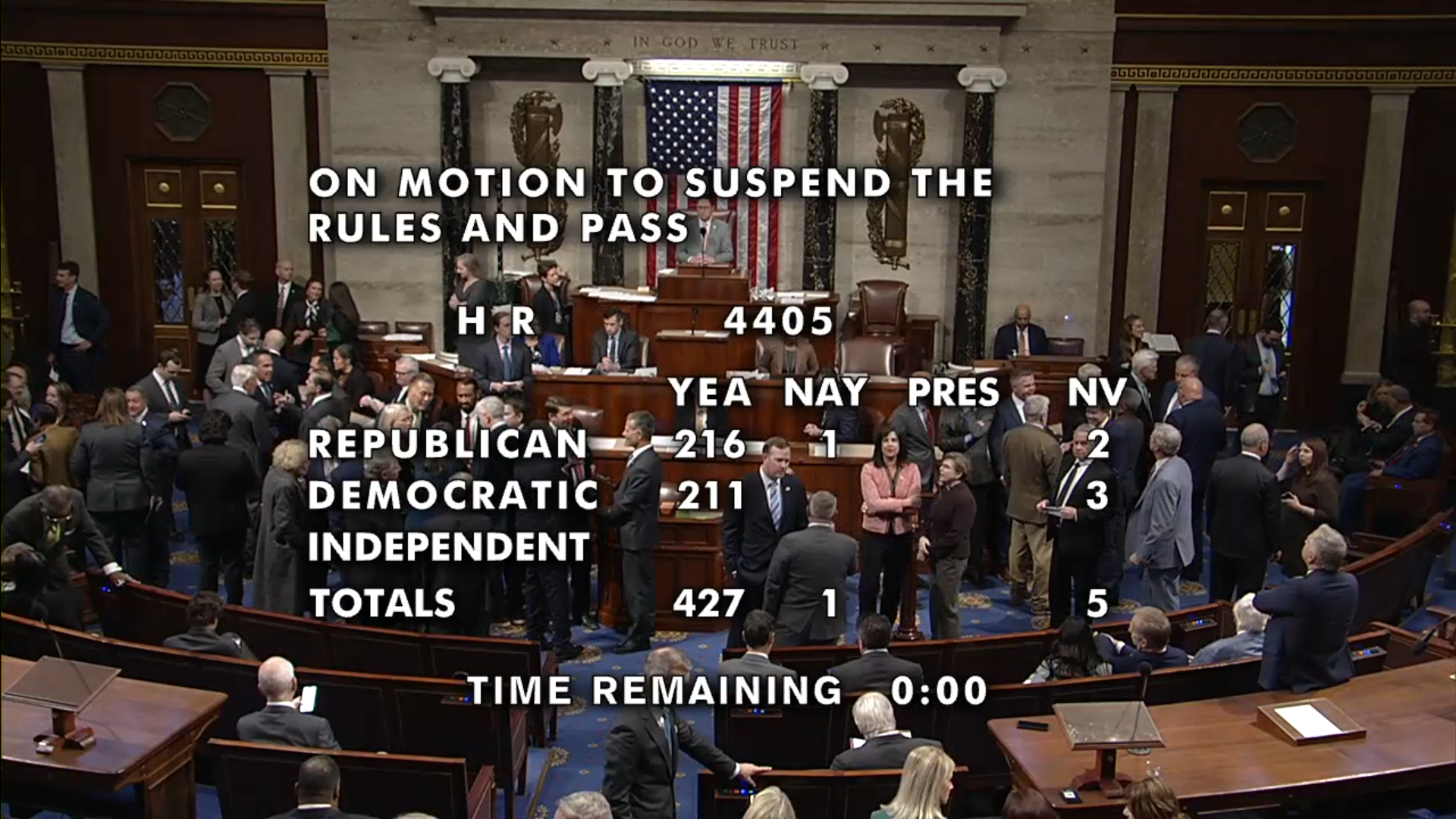
Congressional voting results on the approval of the Epstein Files Transparency Act, demanding the Department of Justice to release the Epstein files. 427 for, 1 against, 5 not voting.

On November 18, 2025, the U.S. House of Representatives approved the Epstein Files Transparency Act in a 427–1 vote. Representative Clay Higgins of Louisiana cast the only dissenting vote. Later the same day, the Senate unanimously voted to pass the same version of the bill, sending it to Trump's desk the next morning.

=== Victim advocacy and early pressure ===
Victims of Epstein and their advocates pressed Congress to compel disclosure of federal records. Virginia Giuffre's brothers, Sky Roberts and Danny Wilson, and Giuffre's sister-in-law, Amanda Roberts, told reporters in July 2025 that they wanted relevant documents to be released. Amanda Roberts added that Giuffre also said she wanted documents to be released, and that Virginia would have been in favor of "transparency and justice". Virginia Giuffre died by suicide earlier in the year.

On September 3, 2025, survivors spoke publicly outside the U.S. Capitol, demanding that Attorney General Bondi release all the files. Frustrated with decades of lack of accountability, some survivors announced plans to compile their own internal list of Epstein's associates if officials continued to withhold information. A month later, accuser Annie Farmer told CNN that creating and releasing their own list was "not the most effective way of us moving forward as a group".

In July, Democratic representatives Jamie Raskin and 15 colleagues sent a letter to Bondi accusing the Justice Department of withholding documents to protect Trump. Representatives Ro Khanna and Marc Veasey introduced separate measures to force the House to vote on requiring release of all Epstein-related records held by the Justice Department. Khanna's measure failed 211–210 along party lines. On July 22, Republican House Speaker Mike Johnson forced an early adjournment of his chamber to delay efforts to release the Epstein files, claiming that he was "done being lectured on transparency". Johnson's effort to delay votes on the files brought about bipartisan backlash among members of the House of Representatives, who accused Republican leadership under Trump and Johnson of shielding Epstein's former clients.

=== Oversight hearings and subpoenas ===
FBI Director Kash Patel testifying before the House Judiciary Committee, where he is questioned on the Epstein files, September 17, 2025

In July 2025, the House Oversight Committee subpoenaed Ghislaine Maxwell, and issued subpoenas for documents to Bill Clinton, former Justice Department officials, and the Justice Department itself in August. The committee demanded that the Justice Department provide the Epstein files by August 19. On August 18, officials informed the committee they would begin providing records on August 22.

Beginning in September, the committee released batches of documents it had received from the Justice Department and, in response to a subpoena, from the Epstein estate. These releases included portions of Epstein's contact records, correspondence, and photographs. FBI Director Kash Patel testified before the Senate Judiciary Committee on September 16 and the House Judiciary Committee the following day. Attorney General Pam Bondi testified before the Senate Judiciary Committee on October 7 and the House Judiciary Committee on October 9.

=== Discharge petition and party defections ===
In September 2025, Representatives Thomas Massie of Kentucky and Ro Khanna of California pursued a discharge petition to force the House to vote on legislation requiring the Justice Department to release the files. Trump and Republican leaders launched a pressure campaign against the effort, with one anonymous official calling signing the petition a "very hostile act to the administration". Despite administration opposition, several Republicans broke with party leadership to sign the petition. Nancy Mace, Lauren Boebert, and Marjorie Taylor Greene joined Massie within days.

The remaining 214 signatures came from Democrats, with the final signatures provided by Representatives James Walkinshaw and Adelita Grijalva after they won special elections to Congress in late September. Grijalva, Senate minority leader Chuck Schumer, and Massie accused Johnson of delaying her swear-in during the 2025 United States federal government shutdown because of her being a key vote for releasing the Epstein files. As the petition neared completion, Trump summoned Representative Lauren Boebert to the White House. Press secretary Karoline Leavitt confirmed the meeting had taken place.

On October 8, Representative Eric Swalwell stated that "a lot of House Republicans" had privately told him they did not intend to keep defending Trump on the issue, with one saying "this Epstein bomb is about to drop." Representative Khanna predicted that 40–50 Republicans might vote for release, and Massie similarly anticipated that Republican support could "snowball". Upon receiving the final signature on November 12, House Speaker Mike Johnson announced the full House would vote the following week on releasing the Epstein files.

Trump's advisors privately informed him that he had lost the issue and that release of the files appeared inevitable. On November 16, Trump publicly reversed his stance, writing on Truth Social that "House Republicans should vote to release the Epstein files." Epstein's brother, Mark Epstein, stated on November 17 that "a pretty good source" had told him there was "a facility in Winchester, Virginia, where they're scrubbing the files to take Republican names out", which he said explained the sudden shift in tone about the release.

=== Passage of the Epstein Files Transparency Act ===
On November 18, 2025, the House voted 217 to 210 to approve a procedural rule that killed the discharge petition but guaranteed a vote on the Epstein Files Transparency Act. Later that day, the House passed the act in a 427 to 1 vote. Representative Clay Higgins of Louisiana cast the only dissenting vote. The Senate unanimously approved the bill the same day. The bill was formally transmitted to the president's desk on the morning of November 19. Trump signed the act later that day without reporters present. The act required the Justice Department to release Epstein-related files by December 19, 2025.

In May 2026, a group called the Institute for Primary Facts opened an exhibit called The Donald J. Trump and Jeffrey Epstein Memorial Reading Room in a downtown Manhattan art gallery with thousands of volumes of the files. For just a few weeks, the New York City space is open to public viewing by RSVP but only survivors, press, law enforcement and Congress can view individual volumes.

=== 2026 congressional review of unredacted files ===
In February 2026, members of Congress were allowed to review unredacted case files related to Jeffrey Epstein at secure federal facilities operated by the Department of Justice. The access followed the passage of the Epstein Files Transparency Act and ongoing congressional oversight of the law's implementation. Lawmakers were allowed to examine the documents on site under controlled conditions but were not permitted to remove, copy, or reproduce the materials. The review was part of continued congressional efforts to monitor the disclosure and handling of Epstein-related records. Several lawmakers criticized the handling of the files, with Representative Jamie Raskin accusing the Department of Justice of obscuring information through unexplained redactions after reviewing the materials.

== Chronology of releases and disclosures ==
Major public releases and leaks of Jeffrey Epstein–related documents (2024–2026)
Date	Source / Tranche	Type	Description	Volume	Notes
January 2024	Court-ordered unsealing in civil litigation	Court release	Unsealing of depositions, filings, and related materials from prior civil defamation litigation involving Ghislaine Maxwell.	Varied by order; no single aggregate count available	Materials released pursuant to federal court orders.
August 27, 2025	Distributed Denial of Secrets – Ehud Barak email cache (via Handala)	Independent leak archive (hacked material)	Publication of over 100,000 emails from the inbox of former Israeli Prime Minister Ehud Barak, spanning 2007–2016, obtained by hacking group Handala and provided to DDoSecrets. The cache includes direct correspondence between Barak and Epstein, documenting their business relationship and social contacts including visits to Epstein's private island.	100,000+ emails (2007–2016)	Handala has been described as a pro-Palestinian hacking group with alleged ties to Iranian intelligence. The Epstein–Barak correspondence forms a subset of the broader cache. Not part of DOJ Transparency Act releases.
September 2, 2025	U.S. House Oversight Committee document release	Congressional release	Pages of documents obtained from the Department of Justice and related entities released by the committee.	33,295 pages	Separate from DOJ's later staged "Data Sets" releases. Democrats on the committee noted approximately 3% were new material.
September 11, 2025	Bloomberg News email cache	Investigative journalism (independent acquisition)	Publication and reporting based on emails from a Yahoo account associated with Epstein.	About 18,700 emails	Not part of DOJ Transparency Act releases.
November 14, 2025	Distributed Denial of Secrets – "Epstein Files" consolidated archive	Independent leak archive	Consolidated public archive that bundled previously scattered official releases (FBI, Interpol, DOJ, Bureau of Prisons, congressional records, and court documents), together with leaked Barak–Epstein emails (previously posted in August 2025) and files released by the DOJ and then subsequently withdrawn. About 18,000 additional unredacted emails held in a researcher-restricted component pending victim identification review.	439.88 GB	It is unclear how much of this release was new.
November 26, 2025	Distributed Denial of Secrets – "Epstein Emails"	Independent leak	Public release of emails from a Yahoo account reported to be associated with Epstein.	About 18,700 emails and 2,200 attachments	Sourced independently from Bloomberg's cache; DDoSecrets states their submitter was not Bloomberg's source, with slight data variations confirming two separate exfiltrations of the same Yahoo account at different times.
December 19, 2025	DOJ "Data Sets 1–8"	Executive branch release (Transparency Act)	Initial release of documents pursuant to the Epstein Files Transparency Act, across eight data sets including investigative files, photographs, and court materials.	Approximately 12,285 items (~125,575 pages) posted as of the statutory deadline, per a DOJ letter to federal court.	Heavily redacted in places; over 500 pages entirely blacked out. Sixteen files were removed from the DOJ webpage within a day of initial posting.
January 30, 2026	DOJ "Data Sets 9–12"	Executive branch release (Transparency Act; final major tranche)	Final major publication under the Transparency Act, including investigative files, financial records, images, and videos.	Over 3 million additional pages; 180,000 images; 2,000 videos. Combined with prior releases: ~3.5 million pages total. DOJ identified ~6 million total responsive pages.	DOJ described this as full compliance with statutory requirements. Critics noted DOJ identified approximately 6 million total responsive pages, leaving roughly half unreleased or withheld.
March 5, 2026	DOJ sixth release (previously removed files)	Executive branch release	Approximately 50,000 files previously removed from the DOJ website were re-released following additional review by the DOJ and FBI.	~50,000 files	Released after the DOJ's January 30 declaration of full compliance with the Transparency Act.

Documents related to Epstein and his associates became public through a combination of court-ordered unsealings, congressional releases, Justice Department disclosures, journalistic investigations, and inadvertent leaks. Court documents from the Ghislaine Maxwell defamation case were unsealed in January 2024, though they contained little information not already publicly known. In September 2025, Bloomberg News independently obtained 18,000 emails from Epstein's personal account.

Following the passage of the Epstein Files Transparency Act in November 2025, the U.S. Department of Justice released files in stages: an initial batch on the act's December 19 deadline, which drew bipartisan criticism for extensive redactions and failure to meet the law's requirements, followed by over 3 million pages on January 30, 2026.

Beginning in September 2025, the House Oversight Committee separately released tens of thousands of pages it obtained from the Justice Department and the Epstein estate. The Justice Department stated that its January 30 release brought it into full compliance with the act, but lawmakers, including Representative Ro Khanna, disputed this, noting that the department had identified over 6 million pages as potentially responsive, yet released only half that amount.

=== 2024 Maxwell case unsealing ===
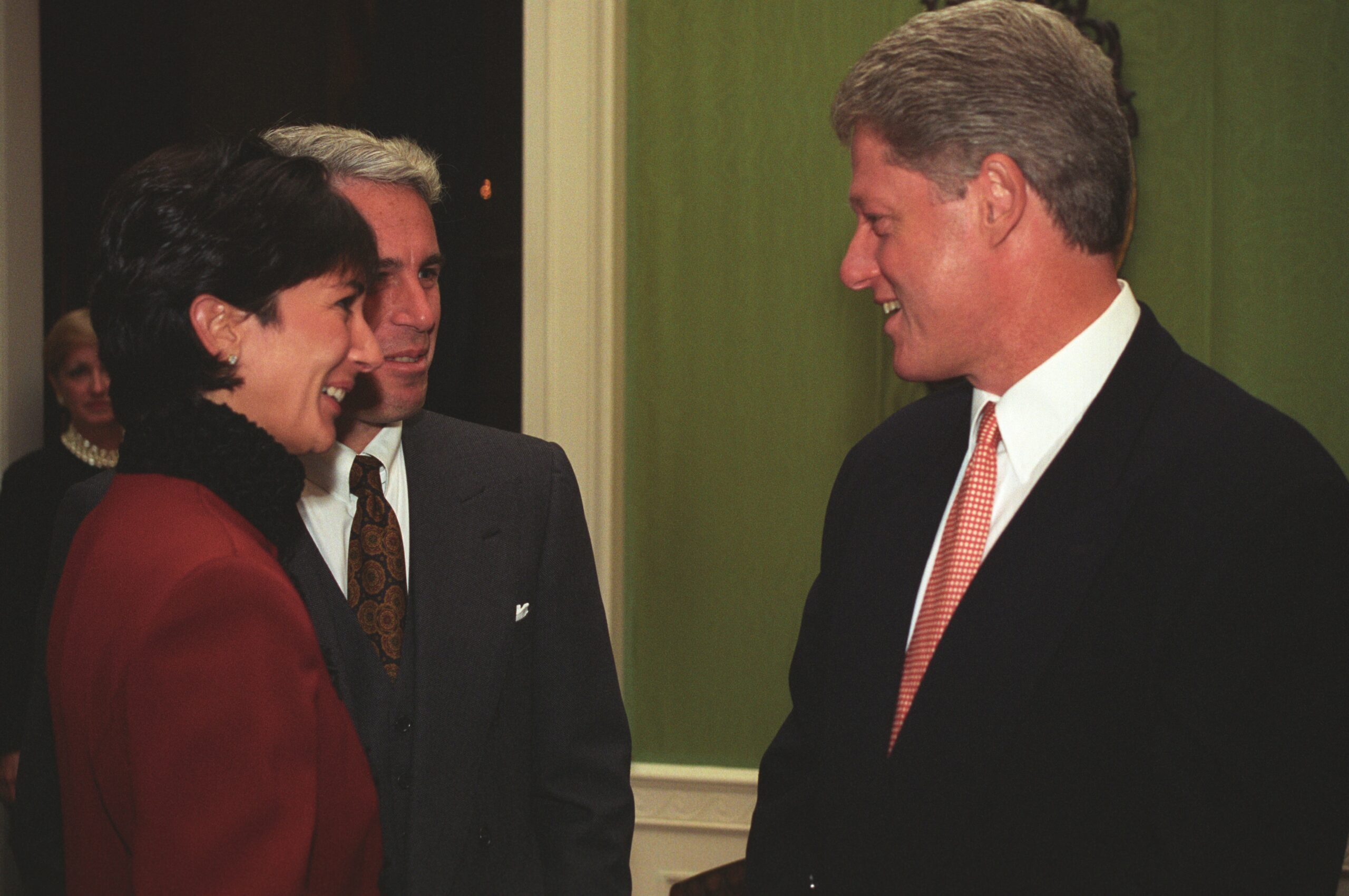
U.S. President Bill Clinton (right) meeting Jeffrey Epstein and Ghislaine Maxwell at the White House on September 29, 1993

In December 2023, New York judge Loretta Preska ordered the unsealing of documents from the 2015 defamation case against Ghislaine Maxwell, with a January 1, 2024, deadline for appeals. The court documents released in January 2024 contained little information not already publicly known. Individuals mentioned included Andrew Mountbatten-Windsor, former presidents Bill Clinton and Donald Trump, former New Mexico governor Bill Richardson, lawyer Alan Dershowitz, singer Michael Jackson, and physicist Stephen Hawking; most were mentioned in passing and not accused of wrongdoing. Model scout Jean-Luc Brunel, accused of sexual abuse by one of Epstein's victims, had died by suicide in 2022 in Paris, France, while under investigation for the rape and sex trafficking of minors.

=== Bloomberg News release (September 2025) ===
In September 2025, Bloomberg News independently obtained approximately 18,700 emails from one of Epstein's personal Yahoo accounts, jeeproject@yahoo.com, spanning from 2002 through 2022. The outlet used cryptographic verification, metadata analysis, and corroboration with external sources to authenticate the cache; four independent experts reviewed the methodology and found no meaningful evidence of fabrication. The account was most active from October 2005 through August 2008, with significant gaps after Epstein's incarceration.

The emails documented Epstein's relationships with academics at Harvard University and other institutions. Correspondence showed researchers, including psychologist Stephen Kosslyn and geneticist George Church, proposing Epstein-funded projects such as a "pleasure genome initiative" exploring neural correlates of pleasure and a genetics-and-brain laboratory to study "far-out ideas such as life extension". Developmental psychologist Howard Gardner told Bloomberg he had "never had the slightest knowledge or even intimation of the darker sides" and wished he "had asked more questions".

The cache revealed aspects of Epstein's legal defense strategy during his 2006 indictment. Notes taken by a research assistant to Alan Dershowitz recorded Dershowitz characterizing accusers as "self-described prostitutes" who "don't feel harmed" during a February 2006 meeting with prosecutors. Dershowitz told Bloomberg the memos were "privileged lawyer client communications" and that he "was acting as any responsible lawyer should: making the case for my client".

The emails contained draft public apology letters prepared for Epstein by crisis strategist and consultant Merrie Spaeth, a former Reagan administration media relations director, in February 2008. Spaeth coached Epstein on communication techniques, including how to answer questions "without being trapped by the parameters" and provided lists of "Good Words" and "Bad Words" for interviews. Though Epstein expressed interest in one draft referencing philosopher William James and describing introspection during an "hour of terror", he never issued a broad public apology. Spaeth told Bloomberg she "ultimately terminated the engagement because of my discomfort with it".

=== House Oversight Committee releases (September–December 2025) ===
Beginning in September 2025, the House Oversight Committee released batches of documents it had received from the Justice Department and, in response to a subpoena, from the Epstein estate. On September 2, the committee released 33,295 pages of Epstein files, though most of the information was already publicly known or available. The Epstein estate began sending files to the committee on September 8, including a bound album of birthday greetings Epstein received for his 50th birthday. On September 26, committee Democrats released six pages showing that Epstein had meetings with financier Peter Thiel, Elon Musk, and Steve Bannon.

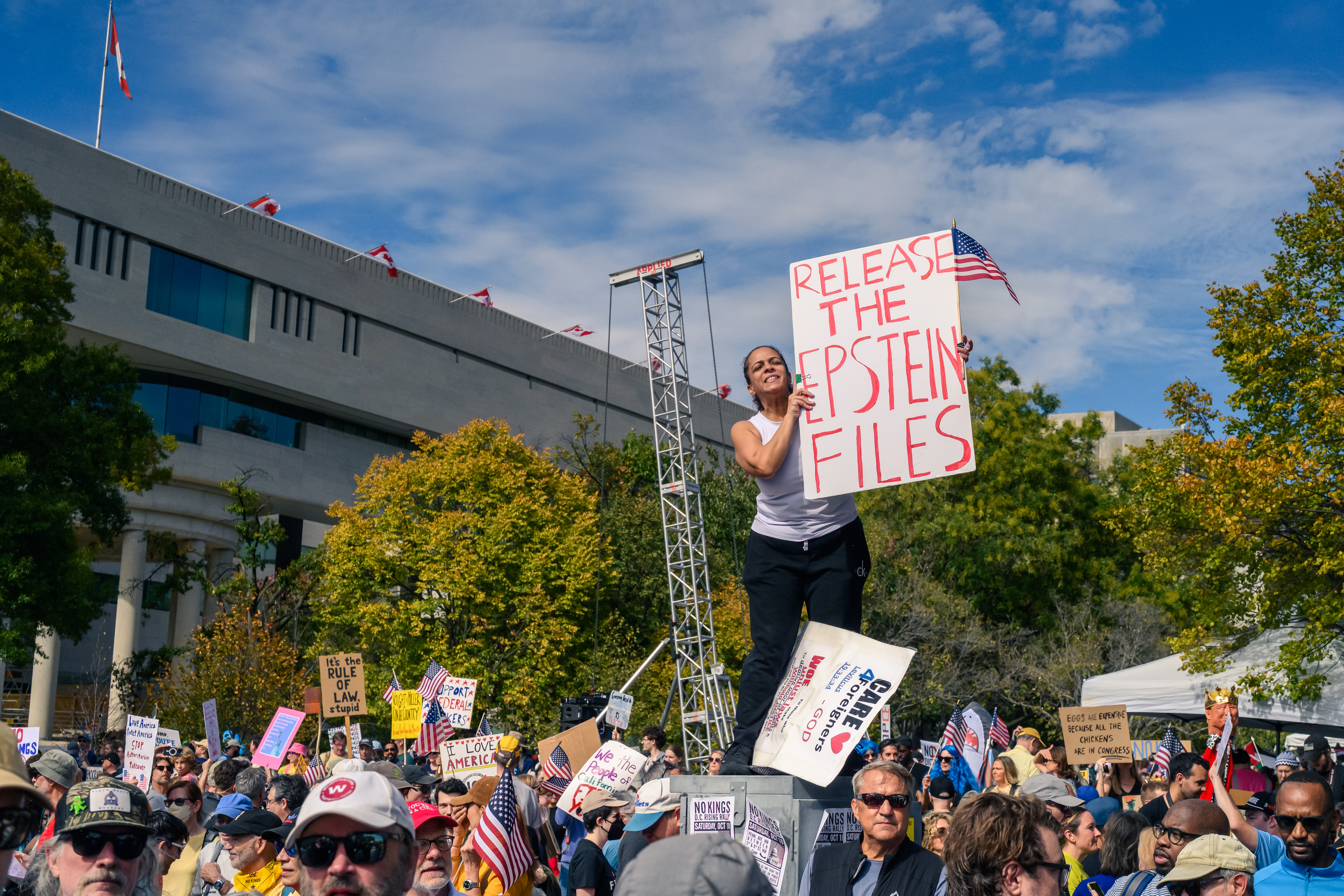
Demonstrators calling for the Epstein files to be released, October 2025

On October 17, the committee released 8,500 pages from the Epstein estate. These showed that Matthew Menchel, the chief criminal prosecutor at the Miami U.S. Attorney's office who was behind Epstein's 2007 plea deal, had apparently had personal meetings with Epstein in 2011, 2013, and 2017.

On November 12, committee Democrats released three Epstein emails pertaining to Trump, including a 2011 exchange with Maxwell in which Epstein referred to Trump as "the dog that hasn't barked" because Trump had "spent hours at my house" with a victim. Hours later, committee Republicans released 20,000 additional pages from Epstein's estate; Trump was mentioned over a thousand times, though none of Epstein's emails were sent directly to Trump or his staff. On November 14, Zeteo published a searchable version of the 26,039 documents.

In December, the committee released images from Epstein's estate. On December 3, it released photos and videos from Epstein's private island, including one showing first names written on a telephone's speed dial. On December 12, it released photos of people including Trump, Bill Clinton, Steve Bannon, Bill Gates, and Richard Branson. On December 18, it released additional photos including Noam Chomsky and Bill Gates.

=== Department of Justice releases under the Epstein Files Transparency Act ===
==== December 2025 release ====
The DOJ released an initial batch of heavily redacted files on December 19, 2025, the deadline set by the Epstein Files Transparency Act. The release drew bipartisan criticism for failing to meet the law's requirements, with over 500 pages being entirely blacked out. Less than a day after the release, sixteen files disappeared from the public webpage without explanation. Faulty redaction techniques in the digital files allowed members of the public to recover blacked-out content, revealing information officials had intended to withhold, including details about the trafficking ring's members and methods. By early January 2026, less than one percent of the files had been publicly released, according to a DOJ letter to U.S. District Judge Paul A. Engelmayer.

==== January 2026 release ====
On January 30, 2026, the DOJ released over 3 million pages of documents, 180,000 images, and 2,000 videos related to Epstein. Deputy Attorney General Todd Blanche stated that the release brought the department into compliance with the Epstein Files Transparency Act and would be the final major release. Federal prosecutors had initially identified six million pages as potentially responsive to the disclosure law, but the DOJ released only half that amount, stating officials had erred on the side of "over-collection". Representative Ro Khanna and other Democratic lawmakers disputed the compliance claim and accused the department of violating the law by withholding "the FBI 302 victim interview statements, a draft indictment and prosecution memorandum prepared during the 2007 Florida investigation, and hundreds of thousands of emails and files from Epstein's computers."

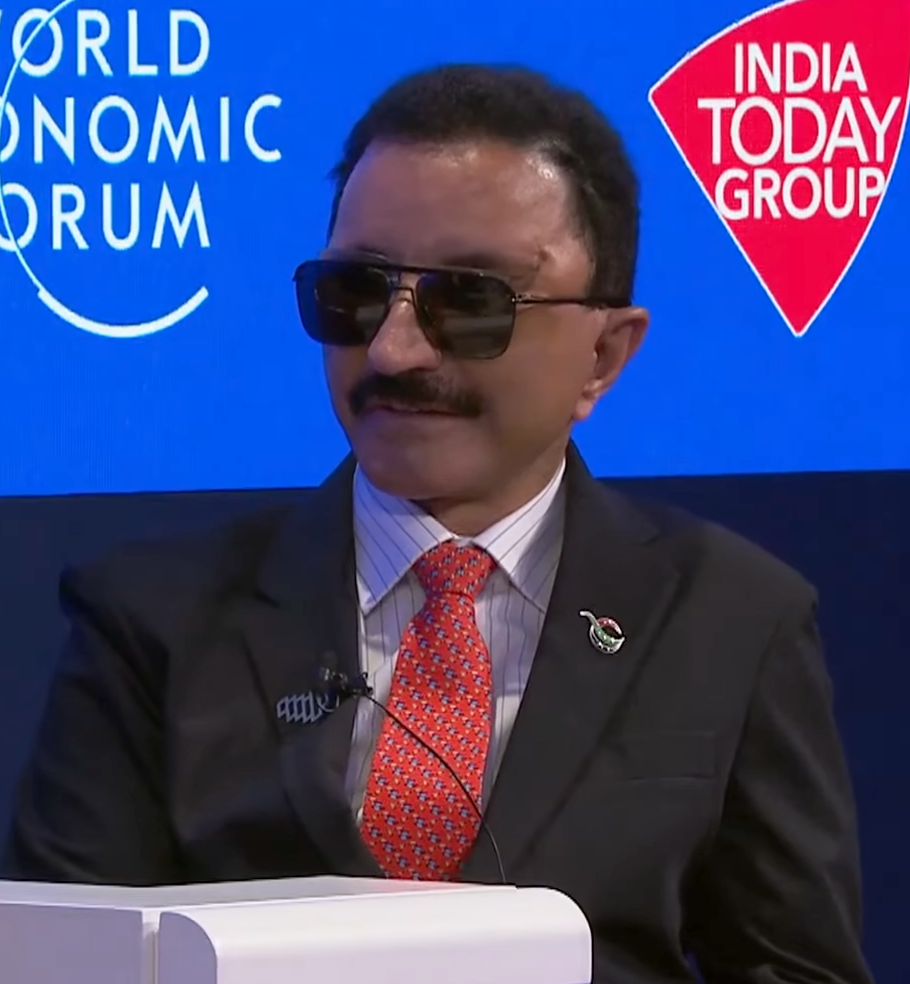
Sultan Ahmed bin Sulayem, CEO and chairman of Dubai's DP World, appears in the Epstein files more than 4,700 times

Blanche stated the White House "had nothing to do" with vetting the documents and that names of powerful men associated with Epstein were not redacted. The DOJ noted that the release may contain "fake or falsely submitted" material, and in its accompanying statement described certain claims against President Trump as "unfounded and false". The department withheld approximately 200,000 pages under various legal privileges, as well as child sexual abuse material or material identifying victims.

The redactions were required to be qualified under the act, and to date, no such qualification has been released alongside the files. The DOJ has admitted some failures to redact information related to victims' identities, and has reported remedying some released files.

Similarly, the DOJ has admitted to redacting the names of individuals who seem to not fall under the qualification of the Act, after congressmembers were given access to view the unredacted files on a government server. After the DOJ announced it would allow individual representatives to view files on the server, pressure from Thomas Massie on why certain names were redacted caused the DOJ to unredact the name of Les Wexner, a prominent businessman listed as a co-conspirator on FBI documents.

On February 10, 2026, Ro Khanna listed Emirati businessman Sultan Ahmed bin Sulayem as one of six men whose names had been redacted from the Epstein files but whom Khanna had been able to identify after spending two hours viewing unredacted files.

Due to the process used by the DOJ to convert emails into the PDF format, the released files contain numerous encoding artifacts, such as the = sign.

=== Independent online databases ===
In November 2025, artist Riley Walz and Kino AI co-founder Luke Igel launched Jmail, a browser-based archive of the Epstein files browsable using the interfaces of various popular apps, with the goal of making the files easier to access and browse. As of February 19, 2026, Jmail has archived a total of 1,412,250 files and 2,474,242 pages; with 1,401,320 documents as released by the DOJ, and 8,624 documents from the House Oversight Committee.

In February 2025, a data engineer using the pseudonym "Eric Keller" launched EpsteinExposed, an online database that shows the relationships between people named in the DOJ-released files, court filings, FBI disclosures, and congressional investigations. As of March 2026, the database has indexed 2.15 million documents and catalogued 1,500 people.

== Conspiracy theories ==
=== Client list conspiracy theory ===
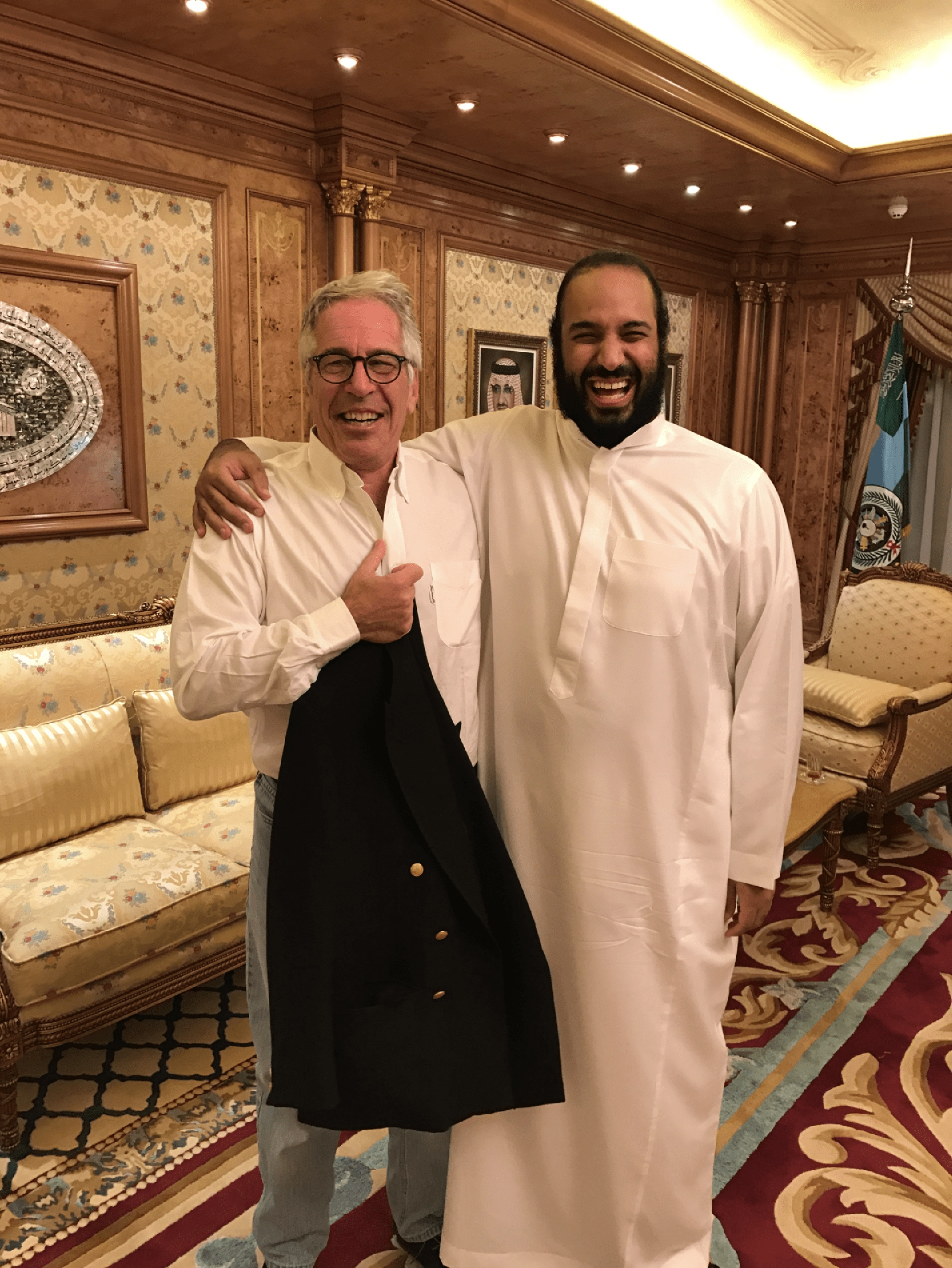
Epstein with Saudi Crown Prince Mohammed bin Salman in Riyadh, c. 2016–2017

Claims surrounding the existence of a "client list" first surfaced in the immediate aftermath of Epstein's death, later reaching heightened prominence in 2025 following a now-deleted tweet from Elon Musk alleging that United States president Donald Trump was "in the Epstein files".

The Trump administration's DOJ released a memo on July 7, 2025, which stated the list did not exist and "no credible evidence [was] found that Epstein blackmailed prominent individuals as part of his actions. We did not uncover evidence that could predicate an investigation against uncharged third parties." The memo was met with skepticism from political commentators across the political spectrum, such as Alex Jones and John Oliver. The same memo also affirmed that Epstein's death was a suicide.

"Epstein's black book" or "Epstein's little black book" refers to a 97-page book of names, phone numbers, emails, and home addresses a former employee took from Epstein's home in 2005 and later tried to sell. Gawker published a redacted version in 2015, and an unredacted version was released on 8chan in 2019. A second book of contacts, sometimes referred to as "Epstein's other little black book", was published by Business Insider in 2021, and is dated October 1997.

According to investigative reporter Julie K. Brown, Epstein's then-girlfriend Ghislaine Maxwell compiled the directory, which included celebrities as well as Epstein's gardeners, hairdresser, barbers, and electrician. Brown said that "the so-called list is really a red herring" and that "every time Epstein or Maxwell met somebody important, they would get their contact information, and they would put it in this file ... So it was pretty clear that this was not a black book in the sense that these were all his clients. It was just a phone directory."

== Reaction and fallout ==
The release of the documents has resulted in numerous resignations, investigations, and formal inquiries worldwide related to figures and organizations implicated in the Epstein files. Miroslav Lajčák, a national security advisor for Slovak Prime Minister Robert Fico and a former president of the United Nations General Assembly, resigned on January 31, 2026, following a joint statement from opposition politicians calling for his departure and mounting pressure from the media; Fico agreed to and accepted the resignation.

Lajčák explained that his interactions with Jeffrey Epstein were strictly professional and social, characterizing them as a necessary part of his diplomatic duties in New York, where Epstein was a well-connected figure who "opened many doors". Lajčák claimed he cannot recall any messages or conversations with Epstein about girls. Lajčák acknowledged that the communication was a "mistake" and "unacceptable" stating: "When I read those messages today, I feel like a fool. It was a private conversation. At the very least, I made a poor judgment. I am paying the price for it."

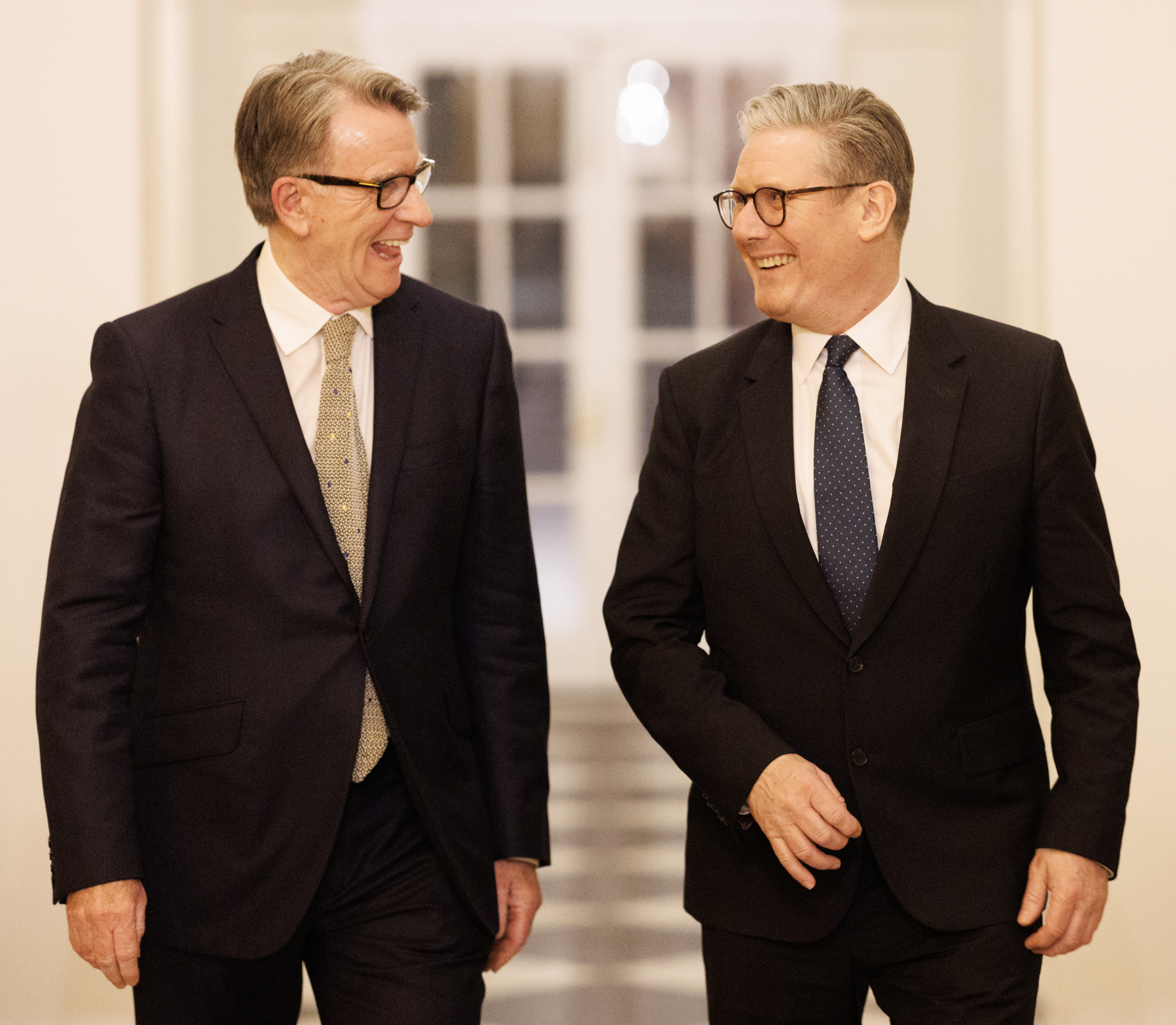
Prime Minister Keir Starmer (right) and Peter Mandelson in February 2025. The release of documents detailing Mandelson's ties to Epstein led to political pressure on Starmer's leadership.

On February 1, 2026, British life peer Peter Mandelson resigned his membership of the Labour Party to avoid causing it "further embarrassment" for being linked in the files. On February 3, Mandelson announced his resignation from the House of Lords, effective on the next day; the day of his announcement, the Metropolitan Police announced they would formally launch a criminal investigation into Mandelson. Downing Street Chief of Staff, Morgan McSweeney, would also resign after taking "full responsibility" for advising Mandelson's appointment.

On February 1, 2026, the US–Ireland Alliance decided to rename a scholarship that had been known as the "George J. Mitchell Scholarship Program" based on allegations, which Mitchell denied, that he along with Epstein and Maxwell abused Virginia Giuffre. The disclosures revived questions about whether the former prince, Andrew Mountbatten-Windsor, should cooperate with U.S. authorities. British Prime Minister Keir Starmer suggested on February 1 that Mountbatten-Windsor should tell American investigators what he knows about Epstein's activities. Mountbatten-Windsor had not responded to a request from members of the U.S. House Oversight Committee for a "transcribed interview" about his "long-standing friendship" with Epstein.

On February 2, 2026, Joanna Rubinstein resigned from her position as the chair of Sweden for UNHCR, a national partner of the United Nations High Commissioner for Refugees. The files revealed that Rubinstein had visited Epstein's private island in 2012, a visit she later confirmed while stating she was unaware of the full extent of his crimes at the time. The Swedish UNHCR board stated they had no prior knowledge of these events and accepted her departure to protect the organization's reputation.

A group of Epstein accusers released a statement criticizing the disclosure, saying the documents made it too easy to identify victims while "Epstein's enablers continue to benefit from secrecy." Representative Jamie Raskin, the ranking Democrat on the House Judiciary Committee, called for lawmakers to be allowed to review unredacted versions of the files to assess whether redactions were lawful. Representative Robert Garcia of California, the ranking Democrat on the House Oversight Committee stated that the Justice Department had defied the committee's August 5 subpoena.

Unlike the Epstein Files Transparency Act, which permits redactions, the subpoena required Attorney General Pam Bondi to release the full, unredacted Epstein files to the committee, including any classified materials and information tied to ongoing investigations. Deputy Attorney General Blanche stated on February 2, 2026, that there would be no additional prosecutions related to Epstein. Blanche said that there was "a lot of correspondence. There's a lot of emails. There's a lot of photographs", but added that the materials did not "allow us necessarily to prosecute somebody." In a congressional hearing, Massie accused Bondi of refusing to comply with the terms to release the Epstein files by pressing her on why billionaire Leslie Wexner had his name in an FBI document redacted. Representative Ro Khanna indicated that he and Representative Thomas Massie would consider contempt or impeachment proceedings against senior officials if compliance with the transparency law did not improve. The House was expected to vote on holding Bill and Hillary Clinton in contempt for refusing a subpoena to testify; attorneys for the Clintons called the subpoenas "invalid and legally unenforceable". Both Clintons sat for depositions in late February.

David A. Ross resigned as chair of the School of Visual Arts.

The documents included a draft statement from the US Department of Justice noting Epstein's death on August 9, the day before his actual death. When questioned, the DOJ said it was an "unfortunate typo."

In the United States, the disclosures also prompted scrutiny of academic institutions. Seventy faculty members at Barnard College, affiliated with Columbia University, signed a letter calling for an investigation into a trustee whose name appeared in the Epstein files. Harvard University announced that it was reviewing former university president Larry Summers' ties to Epstein.

In October 2026, House Democrats on the House Judiciary Committee called for the appointment of a special counsel to investigate Trump's ties to Epstein and possible wrongdoing in the government’s handling of the Epstein inquiry.

=== Government investigations ===
Several countries announced investigations following revelations that their nationals may have been victimized by Epstein or his associates. On February 3, 2026, Turkish prosecutors reviewed newly released Epstein files as part of an investigation into allegations that he trafficked Turkish children. The Ankara Public Prosecutor's Office had launched the inquiry in December 2025 after opposition Iyi Party MP Turhan Çömez highlighted a reference in the files, which reportedly alleged that Epstein transported minor girls from Turkey, the Czech Republic, Asia, and other countries.

Also on February 3, Lithuanian president Gitanas Nausėda called for a law enforcement investigation into potential human trafficking, which Lithuanian prosecutors subsequently announced, after the country's media reported that the names of several Lithuanian models and arts figures are in the files.

On February 5, the president of Latvia, Edgars Rinkēvičs, called for an investigation after the Latvian public broadcaster reported the Epstein documents included passport data and travel details for several Latvian women; the Latvian State Police announced an investigation involving prosecutors and the Organised Crime Bureau into "the possible recruitment of Latvian nationals for sexual exploitation in the United States".

On February 6, Norway reportedly planned to open an inquiry, backed by parliament, into its foreign ministry, after several officials appeared in the files, including former foreign ministers Thorbjørn Jagland and Børge Brende, and diplomat Mona Juul and her husband Terje Rød-Larsen.

On February 19, British police arrested Andrew Mountbatten-Windsor, son of Queen Elizabeth II and former Duke of York, upon suspicion of misconduct in public office from his relationships with Jeffrey Epstein. 10 hours later, he was released from custody, though still "under investigation". Mountbatten-Windsor is the first member of the House of Windsor to be arrested throughout its history, and by extension, the first member of a British royal family to be arrested in 379 years. This was followed by the arrest of British politician Peter Mandelson outside of his home on February 23, also for misconduct in public office, though Mandelson was shortly released on bail.

In an interview released March 17, deputy attorney general Todd Blanche said there was no new evidence to be used in prosecutions.

The U.S. House Oversight Committee heard testimony from former U.S. Attorney General Pam Bondi on May 29 about her handling of the Epstein files. Others who testified to the committee included Leon Black on June 26.

=== Public opinion ===
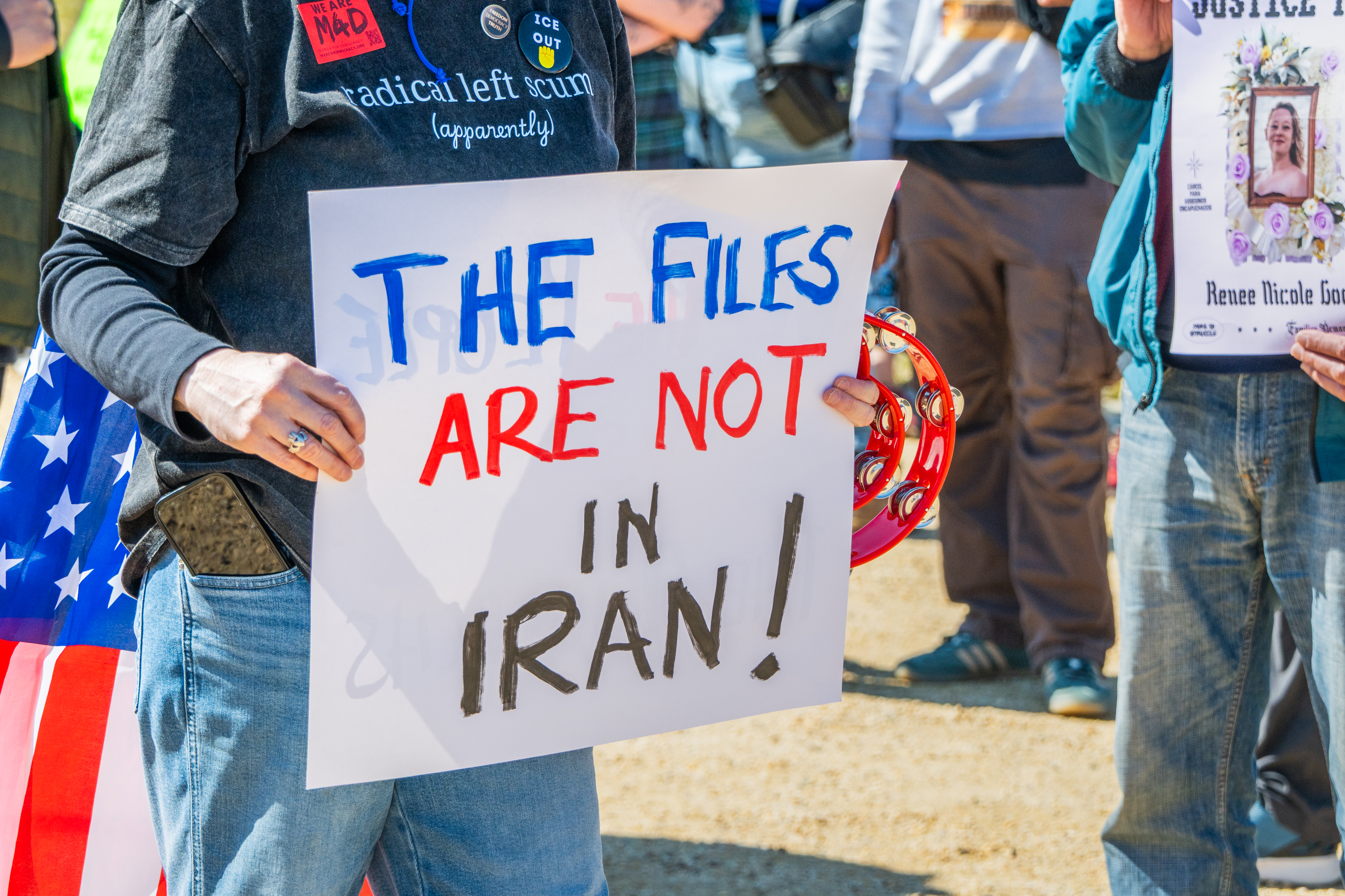
On February 28, 2026, a protester in Washington D.C. promotes the theory that the US-Israel air strikes were a distraction from the Jeffrey Epstein network investigation.

A December 2025 Reuters poll found that 23% of Americans approved of Trump's handling of the Epstein case. A January 2026 CNN poll found that 49% of Americans were dissatisfied with how much of the Epstein files "the federal government has released so far", while 6% were satisfied; two-thirds of respondents said the government was deliberately withholding information.

In Russia, the Kremlin has pointed to various revelations in the files as supposed proof of the West's moral decline; Russian Foreign Ministry spokeswoman Maria Zakharova said, "Now we know how the Western elite treat children, including their own." However, the documents also revealed that Epstein had befriended Sergei Belyakov in 2014.

Significant global coverage of the Epstein files has continued in early 2026. With both reporting and opinion articles released by news agencies such as Al Jazeera, BBC, and Le Monde, there is substantial global interest in the case. Given the nature of the crimes either committed by or for which they were accused, the relationship with either Maxwell and Epstein has been met with public discontent among voters in other countries, most notably Europe and the United Kingdom.

The fallout has led to a variety of creative works: for example, country singer Bryan Andrews released his protest song The Older I Get in response.

==== Epstein class ====
As a result of negative public opinion towards the contents of the Epstein files, a political neologism has emerged called the "Epstein class". It has been used in contemporary public discourse to denote wealthy, powerful, well-connected individuals or dynasties, viewed as operating with impunity from legal and moral accountability, especially in relation to Jeffrey Epstein. They are seen as part of the ruling class and the transnational capitalist class who own capital in multiple countries. Its use has been largely spearheaded by United States House representatives Ro Khanna and Thomas Massie as well as United States senator Jon Ossoff.

=== United Nations ===
A panel of the United Nations Human Rights Council said that the Epstein files suggest a "global criminal enterprise" that committed crimes against humanity.

== See also ==
- Homicide suspicions and conspiracy theories about the death of Jeffrey Epstein
- White House cover-up allegations concerning the Epstein files
- Lolita Express – Boeing 727 once owned by Jeffrey Epstein
- List of federal political sex scandals in the United States
- Little Saint James – Private island in the U.S. Virgin Islands
- Connections of Jeffrey Epstein
  - Relationship of Bill Clinton and Jeffrey Epstein
  - Relationship of Mette-Marit, Crown Princess of Norway, and Jeffrey Epstein
  - Relationship of Peter Mandelson and Jeffrey Epstein
  - Relationship of Prince Andrew and Jeffrey Epstein
  - Relationship of Donald Trump and Jeffrey Epstein
- Westminster paedophile dossier – Document describing alleged child abuse
- Jmail – Browser-based archive of the Epstein files
