= Waltz (surname) =

Waltz, as a surname, may refer to:

People:

- Christoph Waltz (born 1956), Academy Award-winning Austrian-German actor
- David Waltz (1943–2012), American computer scientist and professor
- Gustavus Waltz, (fl. 1732–1759) English opera singer
- Ian Waltz (born 1977), American discus thrower
- Jacob Waltz, the "Dutchman" (actually a German immigrant) of the Lost Dutchman's Gold Mine legend
- John Waltz (baseball) (1860–1931), American baseball manager (for eight games) and executive
- Kenneth Waltz (1924-2013), American professor and scholar of international relations
- Mike Waltz (born 1974), American politician
- Marilyn Waltz (1931–2006), Playboy Playmate of the Month for February (as Margaret Scott) and April 1954 and April 1955
- Patrick Waltz (1924–1972), American film and television actor
- Sasha Waltz (born 1963), German choreographer, dancer and leader of the dance company Sasha Waltz and Guests
- Susan Waltz, American political scientist

Fictional characters:

- Count Waltz, the main antagonist in the video game Eternal Sonata
- Vincent Waltz an antagonist in Dying Light 2 Stay Human

== See also ==
- Hanna Gronkiewicz-Waltz (born 1952), Polish politician
- Walz, a surname
