= Joanna Rubinstein =

Polish-born molecular biologist and biomedical scientist

- Scientific career
- Fields: Molecular biology

Joanna Rubinstein is a Polish-born molecular biologist and biomedical scientist who became a Swedish citizen in 1970. In the 21st century, she has been involved in the management and organization of several international organizations and initiatives to protect children at risk, primarily from sexual exploitation.

== Career ==
Among other relevant positions, she was director of research and graduate studies at the Karolinska Institute (1999–2001), directed the Center for Global Health and Economic Development at the Earth Institute of Columbia University (2005–2015), and was president of the World Childhood Foundation, appointed by Queen Silvia of Sweden in 2014. Although she "more or less retired" in 2021, she continued to participate as an expert in various organizations, such as the World Economic Forum and the Early Childhood Peace Consortium, a partnership between Yale University and UNICEF; she also chaired the UN refugee agency in Sweden (UNHCR) until February 2026, when she resigned.

== Personal life ==
Rubinstein was born in Poland and arrived in Sweden in 1970 as a refugee. Between 2001 and 2021, she lived and worked in the United States, returning to Sweden with her husband in May 2021; the couple has seven grandchildren.

== Epstein Files ==
Rubinstein resigned from her position at UNHCR in February 2026, following the release of a 2012 email in which she thanked Jeffrey Epstein for the reception she and her family had received at Little Saint James, the financier and convicted pedophile's private island. Rubinstein confirms that at the time, she knew of Epstein's conviction for sex crimes, but that she had no idea of the "extent of the abuse."
