= Riley Walz =

American software engineer and artist (born 2002)

- Born: 2002 (age 23–24); Ballston Spa, New York, U.S.
- Occupations: Software engineer and artist
- Employer: OpenAI
- Known for: Jmail; IMG_0001; Bop Spotter; Find My Parking Cops
- Website: walzr.com

Riley Walz (born 2002) is an American software engineer and internet artist. He is known for IMG_0001, a website that surfaces forgotten early-iPhone YouTube uploads; Jmail, a website for easy access and browsing of Epstein Files; and Bop Spotter, a street-corner installation that logged songs heard in San Francisco's Mission District. In September 2025, his website Find My Parking Cops briefly visualized San Francisco parking-enforcement activity in near real time. Shortly after its launch, city officials disabled the underlying public data source.

== Career ==
Walz's work blends programming and culture reporting instincts into small, public-facing experiments. The New Yorker describes his work as existing within "a lineage of prankster art that used the Internet both as a medium and as a venue". Wired profiled his "nostalgic sites" in late 2024, noting that his web experiments frequently tap into collective memory of earlier internet eras. Walz joined the Labs team at OpenAI in February 2026.

== Projects ==
=== Andrew Walz ===
In 2020, while in high school, Walz created a Twitter profile for a fictional Republican congressional candidate named Andrew Walz from the state of Rhode Island to test the platform's verification process. The account was briefly verified and later suspended after media inquiries.

=== Mehran's Steak House ===
Walz was part of the group behind Mehran's Steak House, a fictional restaurant that began as a Google Maps listing for a shared townhouse and built a long waiting list. In September 2023, the group staged a one-night pop-up in an East Village event space with a fixed-price menu and volunteer staff to deliver the concept in person.

=== IMG_0001 ===
Launched in 2024, IMG_0001 cycles through five million YouTube clips that were uploaded directly from early iPhone models with default filenames (e.g., IMG_0001). Wired called it "a gut punch" of internet nostalgia and reported that the site filters for short, low-view videos from roughly 2009–2012. In 2025, the work was exhibited at the Kunstkerk in Dordrecht in collaboration with the Dordrechts Museum.

=== Bop Spotter ===
In 2024, Walz installed a solar-powered Android phone and microphone on a Mission District street pole to capture audio clips, run them through Shazam, and publish an ongoing playlist of recognized songs. The project was titled Bop Spotter as a playful nod to urban "ShotSpotter" gunshot surveillance systems.

=== Find My Parking Cops ===
On September 23, 2025, Walz launched Find My Parking Cops, a map that deduced the near real-time locations and routes of San Francisco parking-enforcement officers by scraping predictable citation IDs from the city's online payment portal. Wired detailed the method and reported that the site went viral before San Francisco MTA officials altered its systems four hours later, disabling the feed. Local outlets noted the shutdown and the public debate over enforcement transparency.

=== Jmail ===
In November 2025, Walz and web developer Luke Igel launched Jmail, a browser-based archive of public emails released under the Epstein Files Transparency Act. The site presents the documents through a Gmail-style interface as if viewed from Jeffrey Epstein's personal inbox. Walz announced the project on Twitter, writing that "we cloned Gmail, except you're logged in as Epstein and can see his emails." The site incorporates "Jemini," an AI search tool, and uses Gemini for optical character recognition to extract text from document scans. The project took five hours to develop and attracted an estimated 18.4 million visits by late November 2025. Walz and Igel later expanded the project with JPhotos, an image database; JFlights, a flight tracking site for Epstein's travel; Jamazon, which tracks his Amazon orders; Jacebook, his Facebook account; Jmessage, his iMessages; Jotify, his music ('Spotify'); and Jdrive, his Google Drive.

== Personal life ==
Walz grew up in Ballston Spa, New York, where he attended Ballston Spa High School. He studied business in college before dropping out to work in tech. As of 2025, he lives in San Francisco, California.
