= Waltz, Kentucky =

Unincorporated community in Kentucky, United States

Waltz
- Unincorporated community
- Location within the state of Kentucky Waltz (the United States)
- Coordinates: 38°19′0″N 83°26′39″W
- Country: United States
- State: Kentucky
- County: Rowan
- Elevation: 863 ft (263 m)
- Time zone: UTC-5 (Eastern (EST))
  - Summer (DST): UTC-4 (EDT)
- GNIS feature ID: 516221

Waltz is an unincorporated community located in Rowan County, Kentucky, United States.
