= Norman Joseph Walz =

American politician

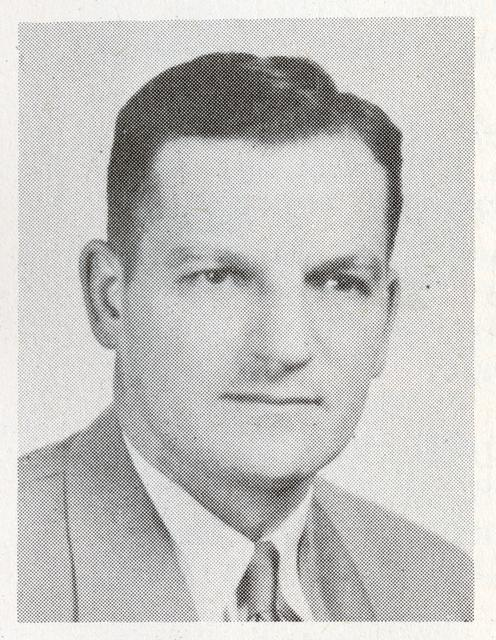

Member of the Minnesota Senate from the 63rd (1955–1962), 57th (1963–1966) district

Member of the Minnesota State Senate
- In office 1955–1966

Personal details
- Born: July 18, 1915 Detroit Lakes, Minnesota
- Died: March 30, 1984 (aged 68) Detroit Lakes, Minnesota
- Party: Democratic-Farmer-Labor (DFL)
- Spouse: Kathryn Ann Walz
- Children: Francis Joseph Walz; Thomas Walz; William Patrick Walz; Margaret Wallace; Pauline Morris; Mary Kay Isaacson; Louise Marie Borstad
- Profession: Founder of Detroit Lakes Independent Oil Company

Military service
- Branch/service: United States Navy

Norman Joseph Walz (July 18, 1915 – March 30, 1984) was an American member of the Minnesota State Senate, serving District 63 from 1955 to 1962 and District 57 from 1963 to 1966.

Walz was born in Detroit Lakes, Minnesota and graduated from Detroit Lakes High School. He served in the United States Navy from 1934 to 1935. He served on the Detroit Lakes City Council.

During his time in the Senate as a member of the Democratic-Farmer-Labor (DFL) party, Walz most notably championed conservation legislation. He co-authored Minnesota Senate File 843, introduced on February 28, 1961, that made the common loon the official state bird of Minnesota. He co-authored the Minnesota public access law, which stated any lake being stocked with fish by the DNR must also have a public access. He also co-authored boating and firearm safety legislation.

He was a member of the Knights of Columbus, Eagles, and the Catholic Order of Foresters.
