= Epstein Files Transparency Act =

2025 US federal law

- Long title: An Act to require the Attorney General release all unclassifed documents and records in possession of the Department of Justice relating to Jeffrey Epstein, and for other purposes.
- Enacted by: the 119th United States Congress

Citations
- Public law: Pub. L. 119–38

Legislative history
- Introduced in the House as H.R. 4405 by Ro Khanna (D–CA) on July 15, 2025; Committee consideration by House Judiciary; Passed the House on November 18, 2025 (427–1); Passed the Senate on November 19, 2025 (unanimous consent); Signed into law by President Donald Trump on November 19, 2025

The Epstein Files Transparency Act (EFTA) is a law passed by the 119th United States Congress and signed by President Donald Trump on November 19, 2025. It requires the U.S. attorney general to "make publicly available in a searchable and downloadable format" all files (the "Epstein files") pertaining to the prosecution of the deceased child sex offender Jeffrey Epstein (if needed, declassifying them to the extent possible) within 30 days of passage, and then to give the Judiciary Committees in both the U.S. House of Representatives and the U.S. Senate an unredacted "list of all government officials and politically exposed persons" named in the files.

In September 2025, Representative Thomas Massie, a member of the Republican Party, filed a discharge petition in support of the bill. On November 12, the discharge petition received the minimum-required 218 signatures needed, from 4 Republican (Note: This included representatives Lauren Boebert, Marjorie Taylor Greene, Nancy Mace, and Thomas Massie.) and 214 Democratic Party representatives, forcing a House vote on the bill. The House of Representatives voted 427–1 to pass the act on November 18, 2025, with Republican representative Clay Higgins of Louisiana casting the lone nay vote. The next day, the Senate passed the bill via unanimous consent, and Trump signed the bill into law. The law gave the attorney general 30 days to release the documents.

On December 19, the U.S. Department of Justice released the first batch of Epstein files, violating U.S. law in failing to release all the files by that day. This failure received bipartisan criticism. Many documents contained extensive redactions, with hundreds of pages entirely blacked out. Following a delayed and heavily criticized rollout, the Department of Justice released additional files in waves, with a fifth release on January 30, 2026. Following this, the department claimed that it had fulfilled its legal obligations and released all available files, amounting to over 3.5 million pages. This announcement received pushback, with some reports indicating that the full Epstein files consist of over 6 million pages. A sixth release was published on March 5, 2026. Following this, about 50,000 previously removed files were restored, after review from the DOJ and FBI. In July 2026, Massie introduced the Epstein Files Transparency Act II, in response to the DOJ's actions.

The publication of the Epstein files had widespread political and cultural effects. In the months that followed, President Trump fired Attorney General Pam Bondi and supported a successful primary challenge against Massie. Other effects included the opening of new political investigations, the resignations of over a dozen prominent public figures and politicians, reforms to the House of Lords in the United Kingdom, the arrests of Peter Mandelson and Andrew Mountbatten-Windsor, and increased backlash against the Starmer ministry which later led to Starmer's resignation. Among the American public, publication of the Epstein files fueled conspiracy theories, misinformation and disinformation, AI-generated hoaxes, anti-elite sentiment, anti-government sentiment, anti-Israel sentiment, anti-Trump sentiment, and anti-Trump conservatism.

== Background ==
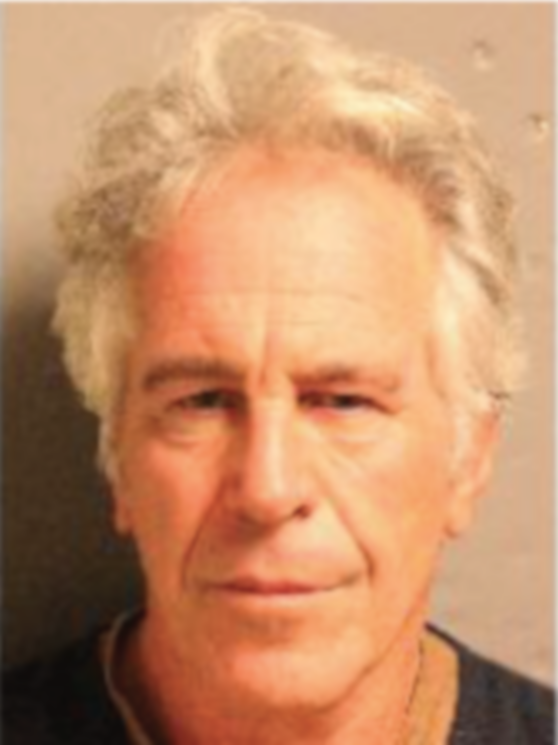
Mug shot of Jeffrey Epstein, 2019

During the 2024 U.S. presidential election, the Republican nominee and former president Donald Trump, when asked by Rachel Campos-Duffy on Fox News in June 2024 whether he would release the Epstein files as president, answered "yeah, I would." In September, while appearing on Lex Fridman's podcast, Trump promised to release the Epstein files if elected. Trump won the 2024 election in November. In February 2025, the U.S. attorney general Pam Bondi stated in a Fox News interview that the Epstein client list was "sitting on my desk right now to review". Later that month, the White House gave binders to several prominent conservative and right-wing figures, including Liz Wheeler and Scott Presler, reading "Epstein Files: Phase 1" and "Declassified". Later that day, Representative Anna Paulina Luna criticized the event, stating that they released "old info".

On July 7, 2025, Bondi released a statement saying that the U.S. Department of Justice (DOJ) found "no incriminating 'client list'", contradicting her February statement. That day, DOJ and the Federal Bureau of Investigation (FBI) announced that no further files from the Epstein investigation would be released. Bondi's statement drew outrage from conservative figures; Wheeler called it "unforgivable behavior", while the Hodgetwins called for Trump to fire Bondi. On July 11, reports emerged that Dan Bongino, the deputy director of the FBI, had a heated confrontation with Bondi over her handling of the files, and was considering resigning. Bongino had reportedly yelled at Bondi, shouting "You fucked this thing up from the start"; Bongino and Patel both told the White House that Bondi needed to resign. Bongino reportedly meet with Susie Wiles, and told her that the Epstein affair was about to become "Trump's Iran–Contra"; he was persuaded to halt his resignation by White House officials. Bongino was later demoted to Co-Deputy Director on September 15, 2025; he later announced his upcoming resignation on December 17, 2025. On July 12, Trump defended Bondi and referred to Epstein as "somebody that nobody cares about."

On July 16, 2025, Trump referred to the Epstein files as "a big hoax." On July 23, reports emerged that earlier in May, Bondi and her deputy Todd Blanche informed Trump that his name was "among many in the Epstein files." Trump denied this report. Trump's change in position drew criticism from prominent podcasters close to Trump, as well as many conservatives. Joe Rogan accused the Trump administration of gaslighting the public, while Andrew Schulz said Trump was "insulting our intelligence". In August 2025, Judge Paul A. Engelmayer denied Bondi's request to unseal grand jury files from the Ghislaine Maxwell prosecution case.

=== White House internal discussions ===
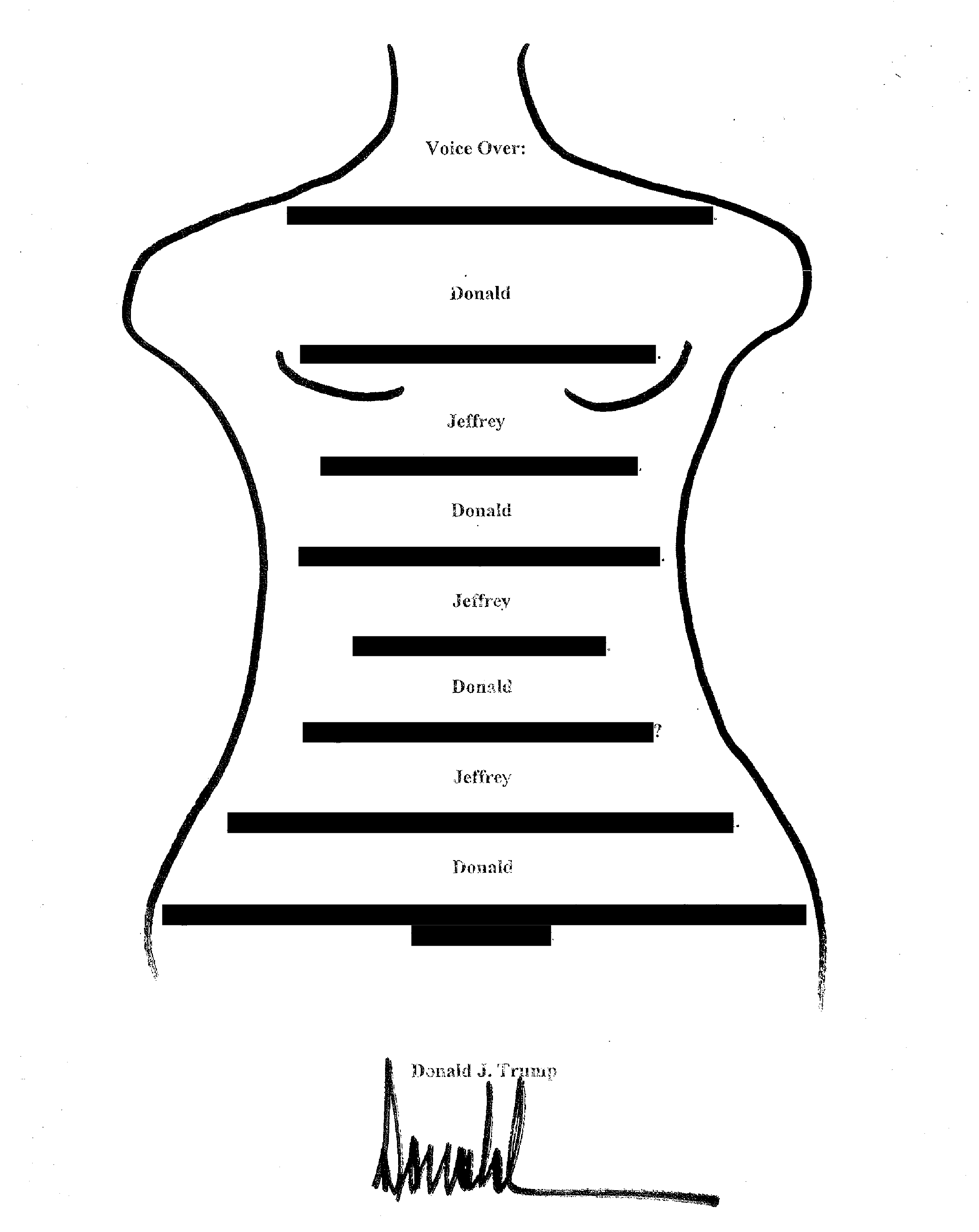
2003 Birthday letter to Epstein attributed to Trump (text redacted due to potential copyright concerns)

According to The New York Times (in content from Regime Change), on July 17, 2025, President Trump and his top officials met in the Situation Room to discuss how to best handle the potential release of the Epstein files. With Trump's previous efforts to kill the release of the files failing, the administration now faced an impending article in The Wall Street Journal, which would be published online during their meeting, which revealed the existence of Jeffrey Epstein's birthday book and Trump's letter in it. Trump had attempted to kill the article by contacting Robert Thomson, Rupert Murdoch, and Emma Tucker, but was unsuccessful.

In attendance were President Trump, Vice President JD Vance, Susie Wiles, David Warrington, Karoline Leavitt, Taylor Budowich, Steven Cheung, Todd Blanche, Stanley Woodward Jr., and James Blair; while Pam Bondi and Kash Patel joined the meeting on speakerphone. According to The New York Times, Trump's team was divided on how to best handle the release of the files. Vice President Vance pushed for transparency, arguing for a quick and full release of the Epstein files, as well as a subsequent congressional investigation. Vance also suggested enlisting commentator Tucker Carlson to interview Ghislaine Maxwell, suggesting Maxwell could clear Trump's name. However, Vance's recommendations were opposed down by Wiles, who labeled him a conspiracy theorist, as well as Blanche and Blair.

Blanche conversely suggested two possible courses of action. The first would be to petition to unseal grand jury testimonies, in hopes of shifting blame for concealing Epstein material onto the judges, who are very likely to deny such a petition. The second would be to publicly release a transcript of Maxwell's testimony. The idea of having Maxwell testify before Congress was also brought up, but Cheung and Blair noted that pardoning Maxwell was off the table, due to how it would be publicly perceived.

== Legislative history ==
=== Discharge petition ===
Massie and Khanna
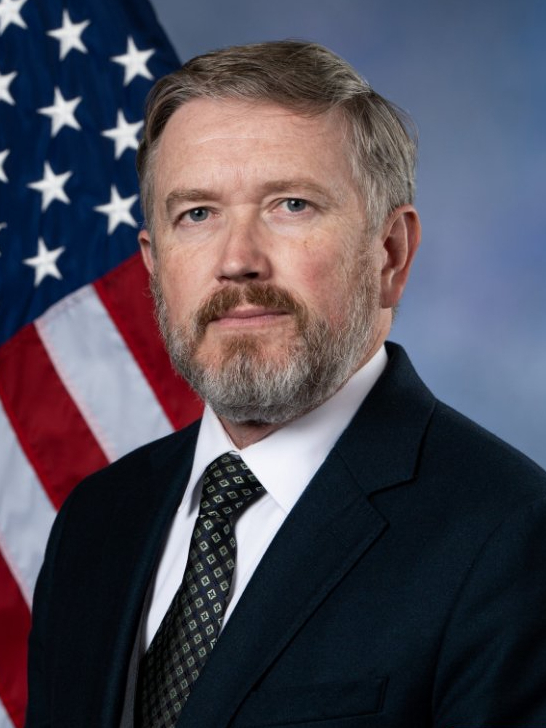
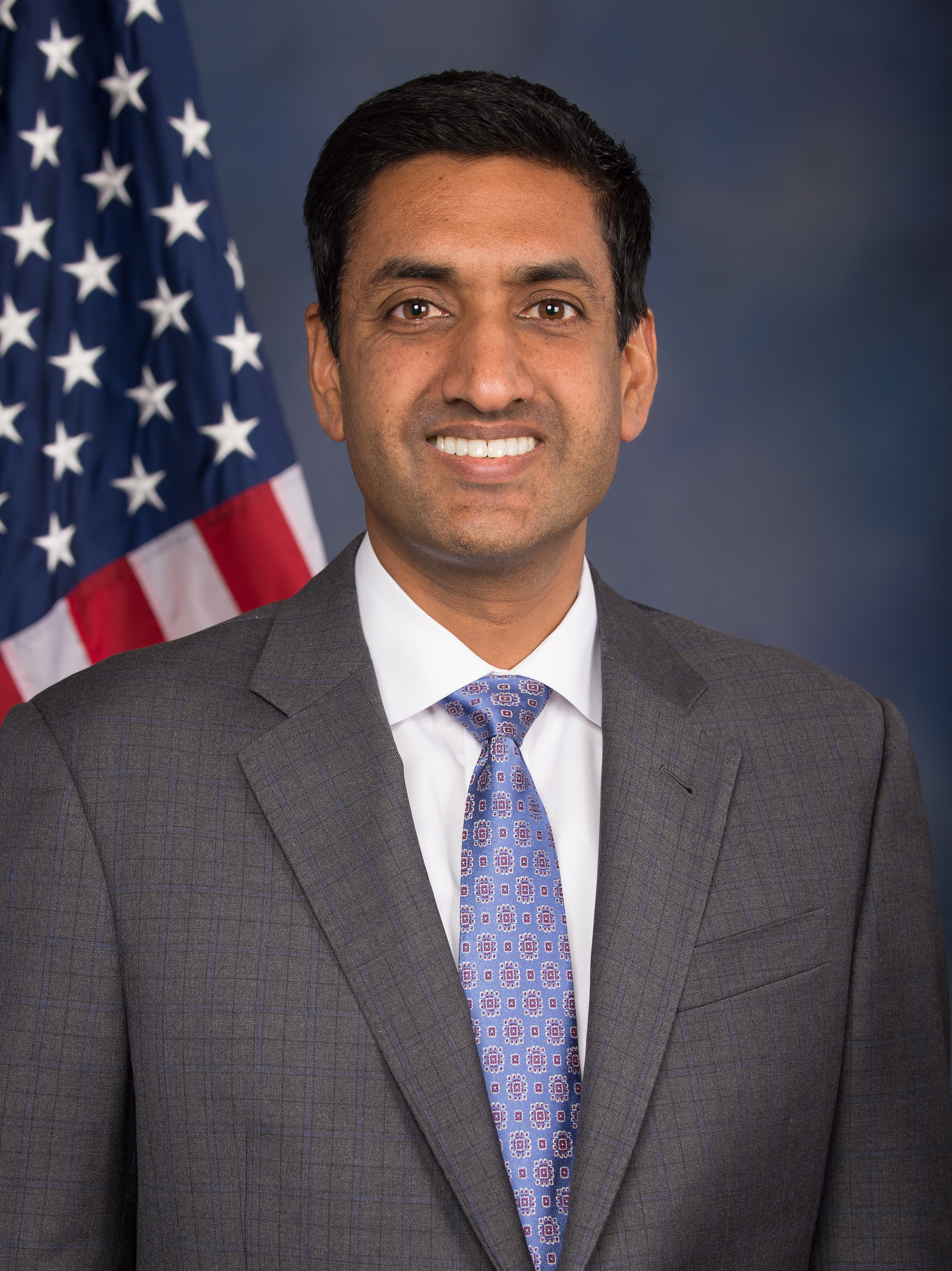
- Co-sponsor Rep. Thomas Massie (R-KY) Co-sponsor Rep. Ro Khanna (D-CA) Representatives Massie and Khanna brought the Epstein Files Transparency Act to a public floor vote using a discharge petition.

On September 2, 2025, (the first day the House was back in session after the August recess) Representative Thomas Massie moved to force the House to vote to require the Justice Department to release the files, through a discharge petition. Trump and other Republicans launched a pressure campaign to prevent the release of the files, with one anonymous official calling voting for Massie's discharge petition a "very hostile act to the administration".

Within several days, Nancy Mace, Lauren Boebert, and Marjorie Taylor Greene signed the discharge petition, alongside many Democrats. Later that month, Greene tweeted: "The Epstein rape and pedophile network must be exposed. ... Release all the Epstein information by any means possible." She added that "if something happens to me, I ask you all to find out" who might be trying "to stop the information from coming out."

On September 9, the House Rules Committee rejected a motion 8–4, from Democratic representative Jim McGovern, to request to vote on the Epstein Files Transparency Act in the House, along party lines. The petition's final two signatures came from Democrats: James Walkinshaw, who won the Virginia 11th District special election on September 9 and was sworn in the next day, and Adelita Grijalva, who won the Arizona 7th congressional district special election on September 23 and was sworn in on November 12.

In the hours before Grijalva was sworn in, Bondi, Blanche, and FBI director Kash Patel met with Boebert regarding the House effort. However, Boebert did not remove her name from the petition, and once Grijalva was sworn in and provided the 218th signature, it was no longer procedurally allowable for any signatories to remove their names.

Mike Johnson, the speaker of the House of Representatives, had delayed Grijalva's swearing-in, generally attributing his decision to the 2025 government shutdown, arguing that the House could not swear in new members during pro forma sessions or during a government shutdown; however, some critics noted that Johnson had sworn in two Republican members, Jimmy Patronis and Randy Fine, during a pro forma session in April. On October 21, the Arizona attorney general, Kris Mayes, sued Johnson, seeking to force him to swear in Grijalva. That day, Johnson told Fox Business that the delay "has zero to do with Epstein", given that "the Epstein files are being released" (seemingly referring to the House Oversight Committee's releases).

=== Interval period ===
On November 12, 2025, Johnson stated that the House would vote on the bill the following week (November 16–22). In the following days, Republican representatives Don Bacon, Andy Biggs, Rob Bresnahan, Tim Burchett, Eli Crane, Warren Davidson, Carlos A. Giménez, Nicole Malliotakis, Max Miller, and Derrick Van Orden, none of whom signed the discharge petition, stated that they will vote in favor of the legislation. Representative María Elvira Salazar stated when asked that she was still "thinking" over her vote. Politico reported that, according to anonymous sources, over 100 Republicans were expected to defect from Johnson and vote for the bill. Representative Ro Khanna predicted that 40–50 Republicans might vote for release, while Massie similarly anticipated that Republican support could "snowball", later predicting a deluge of "100 or more" Republican votes.

On November 15, Trump ordered the DOJ to investigate Epstein's involvement with banks and prominent Democratic figures, including Bill Clinton, Lawrence Summers, and Reid Hoffman. On Truth Social, Trump wrote: "This is another Russia, Russia, Russia Scam, with all arrows pointing to the Democrats". Bondi subsequently assigned the investigation to U.S. attorney Jay Clayton. On November 16, Massie commented on the DOJ's new investigation ordered by Trump, saying:

The president's been saying this is a hoax. He's been saying that for months. Well, he's just now decided to investigate a hoax, if it's a hoax ... I have another concern about these investigations ... If they have ongoing investigations in certain areas, those documents can't be released. So, this might be a big smoke screen, these investigations, to open a bunch of them ... as a last-ditch effort to prevent the release of the Epstein files.

Massie also added that he does not believe Trump himself is implicated in the files, but "instead is trying to protect a bunch of rich and powerful friends, billionaires, donors to his campaign, friends in his social circles". Several hours later, Trump posted on Truth Social, reversing his stance, writing that "House Republicans should vote to release the Epstein files ... it's time to move on from this Democrat Hoax". Representative Robert Garcia commented on Trump's reversal, arguing Trump was "panicking ... he is about to lose this Epstein vote to force the Department of Justice to release the files ... Trump has the power to release all the files today ... instead, he wants to continue this cover-up and launch bogus new investigations to deflect and slow down our investigation." Massie also responded, commenting that Trump "got tired of me winning."

On November 17, Trump said that he would sign the bill, but did not want it to "take it away from us". Massie responded to Trump on Twitter, writing: "Looking forward to attending this bill signing." That day, Johnson also stated that he might support it, if it could be improved in the Senate to better protect victims' identities. Additionally, on that day, Mark Epstein, the brother of Epstein, claimed there was an active coverup to "sanitize" the files by "scrubbing the files to take Republican names out." Mark Epstein claimed he had heard as such from a "pretty good source" and it was the reason for Trump's sudden shift on releasing the files. On November 18, Massie, Khanna, and Greene hosted a press conference at Capitol Hill alongside Epstein abuse survivors.

=== House vote ===
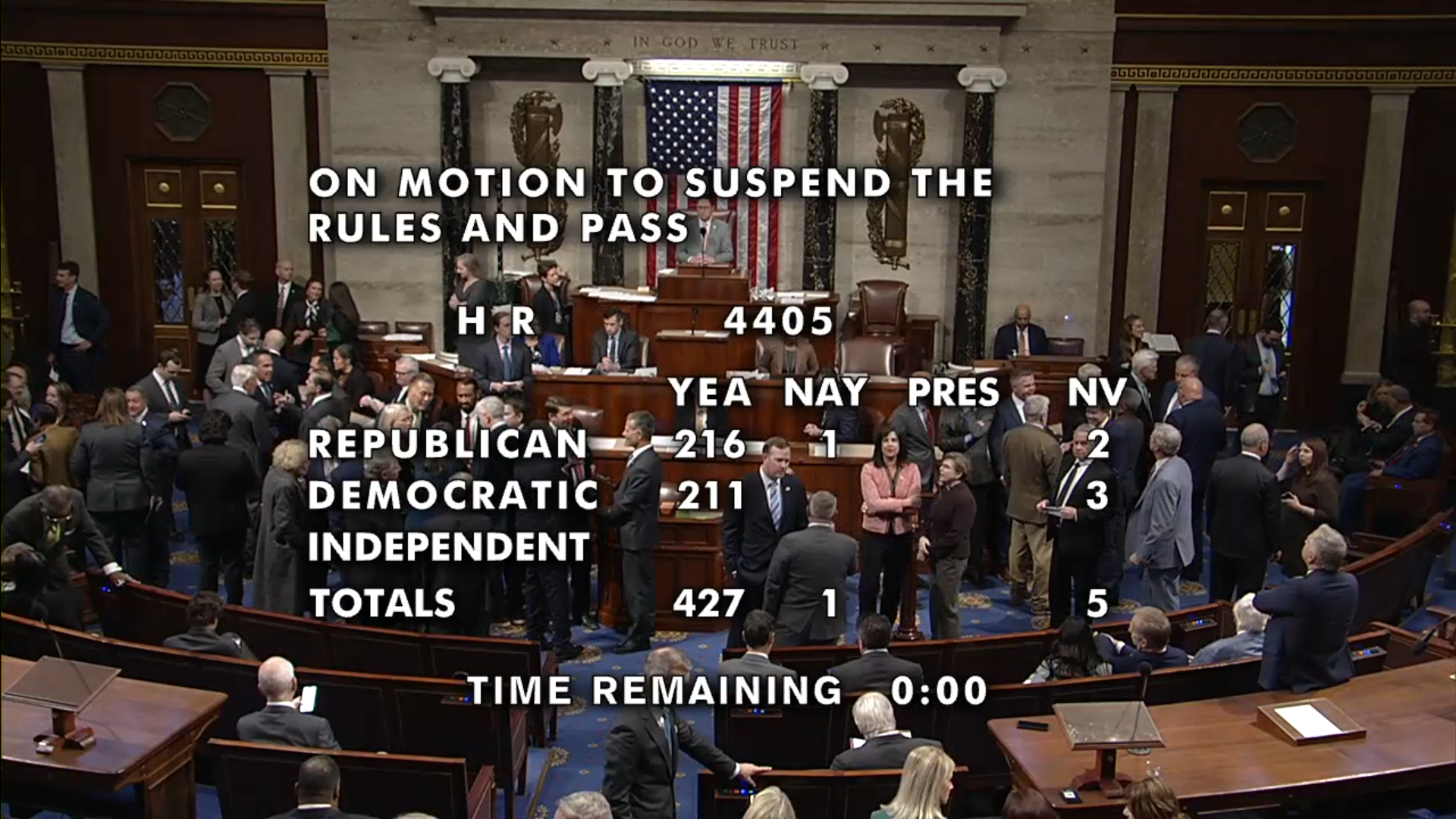
The House of Representatives voting 427–1 to approve the Epstein Files Transparency Act. Clay Higgins (R-LA-3) was the sole representative to vote against it.

The U.S. House of Representatives voted on the act on November 18, 2025, just before 3 p.m. Eastern Time. The bill was considered by the House "under a suspension of rules", meaning it required a two-thirds majority (290) vote to succeed. The vote passed 427–1. Representative Clay Higgins, a Republican, was the lone vote against the bill, arguing that the release of the identities of innocent witnesses and family members related to the case would cause undue harm. Five representatives – Democrats Don Beyer, Greg Casar, and Mikie Sherrill; and Republicans Michael Rulli and Steve Womack – did not vote on the bill.

Epstein Files Transparency Act, November 18, 2025, House vote
Party	Yes	No	Present	Did not vote	Total
Republican	216	1	—N/a	2	219
Democratic	211	—N/a	—N/a	3	214
Total	427	1	—N/a	5	433

=== Senate vote ===
After passing the House, the bill would require 60 votes to pass in the U.S. Senate. That night, the Senate unanimously agreed to pass the bill as soon as it was received from the House. The bill arrived in the Senate on November 19 and was formally transmitted from the Senate to the President's desk that morning.

=== Signing ===
Trump stated on November 17, 2025, that he would sign the Epstein Files Transparency Act into law if it reached his desk. House speaker Mike Johnson, who had previously expressed staunch opposition to the release of the files, said on November 18: "I am deeply disappointed in this outcome. ... It needed amendments, I just spoke to the president about that. We'll see what happens." A presidential veto did not occur, but it could have been overridden had both chambers voted by a two-thirds majority, which they had easily reached in the previous votes on the act. The act reached the presidential desk on the morning of November 19. A senior White House official had told reporters that "the bill will be signed whenever it gets to the White House". In the evening, the White House told reporters that Trump would not appear on camera for the rest of the day, after which Trump announced on Truth Social that he had signed the bill into law.

== Pre-release period ==
On November 19, Bondi said that the Department of Justice had obtained "new information" about Epstein that could potentially justify withholding the release of certain files. Her statement led to public warnings from Republican senators, including Thom Tillis, Lisa Murkowski, and John Kennedy, who advised her to avoid withholding files. Murkowski warned Bondi that Americans will feel "duped" if files are withheld, while Tillis stated that "You can adjust for whatever investigations are going on, but if you do a blanket hold, I think that they're going to have a lot of people angry." Democratic senators also began to publicly criticize Bondi, with Peter Welch predicting that Bondi would work to conceal files. That week, Bondi also filed an expedited motion in the U.S. District Court of Southern Florida for the release of grand jury transcripts in the Epstein case.

On November 26, U.S. district court judge Richard M. Berman ordered the Department of Justice to describe, by December 1, which materials it possesses and how it will protect survivors' privacy. On December 5, Judge Rodney Smith ordered the release of Florida grand jury transcripts, determining that the Epstein Files Transparency Act overrode a law prohibiting the release of grand jury materials. On December 16, Vanity Fair published a series of eleven interviews from Chris Whipple with Susie Wiles, the incumbent White House chief of staff, from the previous several months. During the interviews, Wiles stated that Trump is named in the Epstein files, but "he's not in the file doing anything awful." Wiles also described Trump as having an "alcoholic's personality", and criticized Bondi and Patel. Following the publication, Wiles criticized the article, saying that "Significant context was disregarded". When asked about the article, Trump showed his support for Wiles, describing her as "fantastic".

Thomas Massie's December 18 video commenting on the required release of the Epstein files

On December 18, Massie released a 14-minute video covering the expected release of the files, required by the following day. Massie covered what documents are legally required to be released, stated that there are "at least 20 names of men who are accused of sex crimes in the possession of the FBI", and criticized Bondi, Johnson, and Patel for their handling of the Epstein files release.

=== FBI documents and redaction ===
As of November 2025, reports indicated that the Department of Justice's unreleased Epstein documents consisted of nearly 100,000 pages, as well as 40 computers, 70 CDs, 26 storage drives, and six recording devices, which contain a collective 300 GB of data. According to The New Republic, physical evidence in the FBI's possession also includes "photographs, travel logs, employee lists...blueprints of Epstein's island and Manhattan home...a logbook of visitors to Epstein's private island, and a list [of names]".

On November 25, Jason Leopold of Bloomberg News began to report on the Epstein Files, after partially receiving redacted copies from the FBI; Leopold filed a FOIA request and a lawsuit against the FBI for the files. Leopold received a variety of files, mostly emails, which also revealed the existence of the "Special Redaction Project" (also internally referred to as the "Epstein Transparency Project"). Leopold claimed that between January 2025 and July 2025, FBI personnel worked 4,737 overtime hours, costing the U.S. government over $851,000, to redact files related to the Epstein investigation. On December 18, CNN reported that the Department of Justice was racing to quickly redact documents over the past several weeks, ahead of the December 19 deadline. The article reported that each attorney associated with the case was processing up to 1,000+ documents per week, and that "Counterintelligence specialists were asked to drop nearly all of their other work to process the Epstein documents."

Journalist Katie Phang also sued the attorney general over the redactions. A federal judge gave Todd Blanche until July 2, 2026 to "unredact certain emails, release additional FBI interviews and produce Justice Department documents with potential co-conspirator names unredacted, or show cause for why he cannot do so." He must also, as the law already requires, write in the Federal Register to justify each redaction, for which he was six months late.

== First release – December 19, 2025 ==
According to the text of the law, the Department of Justice was legally required to release the Epstein files by December 19, 2025. The law also provided that no record may be withheld, delayed, or redacted on the basis of embarrassment, reputational harm, or political sensitivity, including to any government official, public figure, or foreign dignitary. However, the law did not establish a penalty for noncompliance. On December 19, Deputy Attorney General Todd Blanche told Fox & Friends there would only be a partial release of files that day. Blanche said the Department of Justice would release "today, several hundred thousand [files], and then over the next couple weeks, I expect several hundred thousand more."

Blanche's announcement received bipartisan criticism from politicians, and was viewed as a violation of U.S. law. Republican politicians including Massie and Marjorie Taylor Greene attacked the staggered rollout of the files. Massie responded to Blanche's remarks with a photograph of the law's text on X, highlighting the requirement that all files be released within 30 days; Senator Rand Paul described the partial release as a "big mistake." Democratic politicians including Chuck Schumer, Ro Khanna, Jamie Raskin, and Robert Garcia all condemned Blanche's announcement, and threatened legal action over the decision. Legal scholar Ryan Goodman also responded, writing on X that "This is a violation of the Epstein Files Transparency Act."

Democratic representative Alexandria Ocasio-Cortez wrote on X that "Everyone involved will have to answer for this. Pam Bondi, Kash Patel, whole admin. Protecting a bunch of rapists and pedophiles because they have money, power, and connections. Bondi should resign tonight." Khanna stated that he was considering bringing articles of impeachment against Bondi, while Massie also suggested that Bondi could be charged with obstruction of justice, over her failure to release every file by December 19, 2025. According to CBS News, the Epstein files released on December 19 total 3,965 files, at 3 GB of data. A website called The Epstein Library went live to the public, including thousands of PDFs. The site seemed to contain a search function, though HuffPost noted it was not immediately working.

=== Redactions ===
"Grand Jury-NY" file. All 119 pages were released entirely redacted.

Following the December 19 release, the Department of Justice received widespread criticism for the level of redaction the released files contained. Fox News reported that the Department of Justice redacted the names of "politically exposed individuals and government officials", in violation of the law. This report was disputed by Blanche. In a letter written by Blanche, obtained by Fox News, 1,200 names of victims or relatives were redacted before the files released. On December 19, CBS News reported that among the approximately 3,900 files released, at least 550 pages of documents were entirely blacked out. One 119-page file attributed to the grand jury of New York was highlighted by Ro Khanna and Chuck Schumer for being entirely redacted.

=== Content of files ===
Following the December 19 release, various news outlets began analyzing the available files. The Associated Press wrote in their analysis of the files that "the mere inclusion of someone's name or images in files from the investigation does not imply [wrongdoing]." The Associated Press reported that the files contained several photographs of former U.S. president Bill Clinton in a private plane and a hot-tub. The New York Times reported that Trump appeared only a small number of times in the released files, with the documents instead appearing to focus heavily on Clinton. The release also included photographs of Epstein with a variety of celebrities and public figures including Bill Gates, Michael Jackson, Mick Jagger, Diana Ross, Walter Cronkite, Kevin Spacey, Chris Tucker, David Copperfield, Peter Mandelson, Andrew Mountbatten-Windsor, Sarah Ferguson, Richard Branson, David Brooks, David Blaine, Woody Allen, and Ehud Barak.

Included was a 2003 press photo of Michael Jackson with Bill Clinton, Diana Ross, and their children — Evan Ross, Paris Jackson, and Michael "Prince" Jackson Jr. — the latter's faces redacted. Evan Ross confirmed himself and the Jackson children as in the photo. Social media users criticized the photo's redactions as unnecessary, and argued it intended to imply Ross and the Jackson children were victims and their parents questionable. White House press secretary Abigail Jackson (no relation) defended the redaction on the ground the photo featured minors.

Within a day of the release, over a dozen files were removed from the justice.gov website with no public notice or explanation, including a photo showing a picture of Trump, Epstein, and Maxwell together. It had the filename "EFTA00000468". Schumer highlighted that file's removal, stating; "if they're taking this down, just imagine how much more they're trying to hide... This could be one of the biggest cover ups in American history." On December 21, the Department of Justice said that out of "an abundance of caution", the Trump photo was "temporarily removed... for further review"; the photo was restored to the website later that day.

== Second release – December 20, 2025 ==
At around midnight, on December 20, the Department of Justice released some additional files containing grand jury materials, as well as flight logs with redacted names. These also included a 32-page slide presentation from 2019, as well as a FBI agent's testimony to a grand jury in 2019.

== Third release – December 22, 2025 ==
On December 22, an additional 11,034 documents were released by the Department of Justice. Within hours, the public discovered that many redactions could be easily bypassed with software like Photoshop or other basic editing tools, or by copy-pasting the seemingly redacted material to reveal the underlying text. The redacted portions were found to contain significant findings as to the members and techniques of Epstein's trafficking ring, rather than only redacting the personal information of victims as permitted by the Transparency Act.

== Fourth release – December 23, 2025 ==
On December 23, nearly 30,000 additional files were released by the Department of Justice. With their release, the Department of Justice issued a statement claiming that "untrue and sensationalist claims made against President Trump that were submitted to the FBI right before the 2020 election. To be clear: the claims are unfounded and false". Unlike the first document release, which mentions Trump in very few instances, the December 23 release mentions Trump more frequently. One case file included a direct rape allegation against Trump. An included 2020 email stated Trump had flown with Epstein "many more times than previously has been reported"; with Trump listed as a passenger on at least eight flights on Epstein's private jet, between 1993 and 1996.

=== Alleged Epstein-Nassar letter ===
A purported postcard from Epstein to Larry Nassar was also released, dated August 13, 2019; Epstein died on August 10, 2019, three days before the letter was postmarked. Additionally, the letter's envelope contained a postmark from North Virginia, while Epstein was incarcerated in Manhattan. In the letter, Epstein allegedly wrote: "Our president also shares our love of young, nubile girls ... When a young beauty walked by, he loved to 'grab snatch,' ... Life is unfair". The Department of Justice called the letter "fake", following FBI analysis, and stated it released it due to that being required by law. The existence of the letter had first been reported in 2023 by the Associated Press. Another document released showed the letter underwent a handwriting-analysis at the FBI in 2020. Margaret Hartman of New York commented on the letter, writing "there is significant reason to doubt its legitimacy...It wouldn’t have been hard for someone to write this letter as a sick joke".

=== Unsubstantiated FBI tip on Trump ===
Additionally, a released document contained an unverified FBI tip, from an unnamed woman in New Mexico. The woman submitted an online tip to the FBI in August 2020, shortly before the 2020 election. The woman alleged that in 1984, she was sex trafficked by her uncle and Epstein, while pregnant at the age of thirteen. She additionally alleged that her child was killed shortly after being born in 1984, and that Trump was present for the disposal of the infant's body within Lake Michigan. Snopes has cast doubt on the legitimacy of the accusation, noting that "the information [does] not line up with the established timeline of Trump's friendship with Epstein." Snopes noted that the woman alleged that the incident occurred in 1984 while Trump and Epstein did not meet until years later in the late 1980s; additionally, there is no evidence or documentation of Trump or Epstein having ties to the town.

=== Aftermath ===
Axios reported on December 24 that there were 700,000 files remaining which were expected to be released by December 30. Later that day, other outlets reported the Justice Department had yet to internally review and redact over a million files and said it "may take a few more weeks" to release them as it sought U.S. attorneys to volunteer over Christmas to remotely do this work. On December 30, The New York Times reported that the Department of Justice was reviewing as many as 5.2 million files. On January 5, the Department of Justice said in a court filing that it had reviewed "12,285 documents (comprising 125,575 pages)" but had yet to review at least 2 million documents. The letter also referenced an additional report, which separately suggested more than 5 million documents could be under review.

In early January 2026, less than 1% of the files were publicly released according to a DOJ letter sent to U.S. District Judge Paul A. Engelmayer. On January 8, 2026, Khanna and Massie wrote to Judge Engelmayer, "to suggest the appointment of a Special Master and Independent Monitor" so as to force the Justice Department to produce the remaining files. On January 16, Bondi and Blanche filed a six-page letter to Engelmayer, asking him to deny the Special Master request. On January 21, Engelmayer denied the special master request.

== Fifth release – January 30, 2026 ==
On January 30, 2026, the U.S. Justice Department released 3.5 million documents, with U.S. Deputy Attorney General Todd Blanche also alleging that these documents were the last remaining documents that had yet to be made public. According to Blanche, the release of these files brought the U.S. Department of Justice in compliance with the Epstein Files Transparency Act. Unlike previous releases, the Justice Department's webpage for the fifth release cannot be accessed until visitors agree they are at least 18 years old due to the inclusion of pornography within the released files. A document from the release, titled EFTA01660679, appeared to be removed, but was reportedly restored after a period of overload.

=== Content of files ===
Files unveiled in the January 30 release entail a variety of images, reports, documents, emails, and claims including:

- Anil Ambani - Was in regular contact with Jeffrey Epstein from 2017 to 2019, exchanging texts and emails where Ambani sought Epstein's help to arrange meetings with Trump administration figures like Jared Kushner and Steve Bannon ahead of Indian PM Modi's visits, discussed political and business matters, and received an invitation to Epstein's private Caribbean island.
- Dan Ariely - Email correspondence between Epstein and the Israeli-American professor, who appeared to have maintained a six-year friendship from 2010 to 2016.
- Ehud Barak - Revelations that the Israeli Prime Minister and his wife, Nili Priel, stayed in a New York apartment owned by Epstein on multiple occasions.
- Richard Branson - A 2013 email from Branson to Epstein, reading, "It was really nice seeing you yesterday...Anytime you're in the area would love to see you. As long as you bring your harem!"
- William J. Burns - Burns, who served as the 8th Director of the CIA (2021-2025), engaged in several meetings with Epstein, after his 2008 criminal conviction.
- George H.W. Bush - A 2019 FBI document, from a purported male Epstein victim, who accused former Presidents Bush and Bill Clinton of raping him on a yacht cruise, in 2000 and that current president Donald J. Trump along with his wife Melania Trump were also present on the yacht. The man also alleged he witnessed babies being dismembered, as well as ritualistic sacrifices. The document includes a note from federal authorities attached to the case, who noted at the time that no evidence was provided by the alleged victim to verify his claim.
- Bill Clinton - An October 2009 email from Peggy Siegal, stating that Clinton and Jeff Bezos visited Epstein's house in 2009.
- Mariette DiChristina - In February 2026, Boston University's student newspaper The Daily Free Press reported that Boston University College of Communication Dean Mariette DiChristina, while serving as editor-in-chief of Scientific American, had exchanged emails in 2014 and 2015 with convicted sex offender Jeffrey Epstein. These emails, released by the United States Department of Justice under the Epstein Files Transparency Act, showed that DiChristina and Epstein made plans for an in-person meeting in Manhattan in July 2014 and scheduled phone calls. DiChristina also asked Epstein to attend an editorial meeting at Scientific American. All of this communication occurred after Epstein had pleaded guilty in 2008 to soliciting a minor for prostitution and registered as a sex offender, which received a lot of press coverage at the time. After their July 29, 2014 meeting, DiChristina wrote in an email to a recipient whose name was redacted, that she was "inspired to help him with his worthy goals."
- Bill Gates - Two 2013 emails that Epstein sent to himself, alleging that Gates had "sex with Russian girls" that gave him a sexually transmitted infection, which required antibiotics to treat.
- Thorbjørn Jagland - Revelations that the Norwegian Prime Minister had once planned a family vacation on Epstein's private island, before later cancelling it.
- Jay-Z - An unverified FBI report, from an unnamed caller, alleged that she was drugged, and handled by rapper Pusha T, before later waking up in a room with Jay-Z and Harvey Weinstein present.
- Dean Kamen - A 2013 email detailing Kamen's plans to spend a night on Epstein's island.
- Miroslav Lajčák - Emails between Epstein and Lajčák, where the two discussed young women. This led to Lajčák's resignation.
- Howard Lutnick - Emails that showed that Lutnick was invited to have lunch with Epstein in 2012; Lutnick has previously stated that he severed ties with Epstein in 2005.
- Peter Mandelson - Documents showing Epstein had sent Mandelson money, between 2003 and 2004.
- Ashley Massaro - An anonymous 2020 complaint, submitted to U.S. Attorney Audrey Strauss, alleging that Massaro worked for Ghislaine Maxwell.
- Ghislaine Maxwell - The public release of Maxwell's 2020 mugshot.
- Mette-Marit, Crown Princess of Norway - Email exchanges between Epstein and the Crown Princess from 2011 to 2014. Following the release, she apologized for her "poor judgement".
- George J. Mitchell - Email communication between Epstein and Mitchell in 2013. Mitchell had previously been accused having sex with an Epstein victim in 2019.
- Narendra Modi - A 2017 email from Epstein revealing that he advised Modi to visit Israel, for political purposes. Epstein wrote, "The Indian Prime Minister Modi took advice. and danced and sang in Israel for the benefit of the US president. They had met a few weeks ago. IT WORKED".
- Andrew Mountbatten-Windsor - A photograph of Mountbatten-Windsor, which appear to show him kneeling over a woman lying on the ground.
- Elon Musk - Email correspondence between Musk and Epstein, including a 2012 email from Musk asking Epstein when the "wildest party on your island" will be.
- Christopher Poole - Email correspondence between Epstein and Boris Nikolic claiming that the former had personally met Poole (referred to by his online handle, "moot") and "drove him home." Other correspondences claim that Epstein motivated Poole to establish the /pol/ board on 4chan.
- Bill Richardson - Richardson met with Epstein at least nine times following the latter's conviction, including one visit to his island.
- Ariane de Rothschild – Reporting based on newly released DOJ “Epstein files” describes extensive email contact between Epstein and Ariane de Rothschild, head of the Edmond de Rothschild Group, including discussions in which Epstein is portrayed as an informal adviser and intermediary during an internal dispute over the “Rothschild” name. Le Monde reports that a draft agreement dated October 5, 2015, records the Edmond de Rothschild Group agreeing to pay $25 million to Epstein's U.S. Virgin Islands–registered Southern Trust Company for services related to introductions and strategic/tax-risk advice connected to U.S. investigations into Swiss banking practices; The Wall Street Journal has also reported on a $25 million consulting contract involving de Rothschild and Epstein.
- Steven Sinofsky - Email communication between Epstein and Sinofsky, the latter of whom sought business advice from Epstein.
- Steve Tisch - Email correspondence between Epstein and Tisch, where they discussed introducing women to the latter.
- Donald Trump - An FBI report, citing a "credible" source, claiming that Trump has been "compromised by Israel".
- Brian Vickers - Email correspondence between Epstein and Vickers, dating back to 2012. Vicker's ex-wife, Sarah Kellen, has previously been accused of having ties to Epstein's sex-trafficking.
- Casey Wasserman - Email correspondence from 2003, between Maxwell and Wasserman. Wasserman wrote to Maxwell, stating how he missed her and wished to see her in a tight leather outfit, while Maxwell offered Wasserman a massage that can "drive a man wild". Wasserman publicly responded to the files' release with regret, apologizing for his association with Maxwell, while distancing himself from Epstein and maintaining his innocence.
- Les Wexner - Documents covering Wexner's attempts to hire a criminal defense attorney, following FBI efforts to serve him a 2019 subpoena due to his ties to Epstein.

Additional information revealed in the files include:

- In the early 2000s, Epstein donated money to the Friends of the Israel Defense Forces, Jewish National Fund, and National Council of Jewish Women.
- Epstein invested $1.5 million into the Israeli company Carbyne, implied that he believed Robert Maxwell was assassinated by Israel, and was accused by an anonymous confidential source to the FBI of being a Mossad agent.
- An email from Microsoft that reveals Epstein was permanently banned from Xbox Live in December 2013.
- An unknown individual, who texted Epstein in June 2014, writing: "I give you permission to kill him. He is apparently with Olga. He lied to you and he lied to me."
- A 2011 email from Epstein, revealing plans to help seize Libya's frozen state assets, estimated by Epstein at $80 billion. Epstein sought the help of British and Israeli intelligence to help seize the funds, in exchange for a "10 percent to 25 percent" compensation fee.

==== Epstein victims' private information ====
A group of Epstein victims issued a statement criticizing the release's partial failure to redact or hide the names of some victims, writing, "As survivors, we should never be the ones named, scrutinized, and retraumatized while Epstein's enablers continue to benefit from secrecy." A review from The Wall Street Journal found the names of 43 out of 47 victims in the files left unredacted. The Department of Justice later announced that it removed approximately 9,500 documents which contained victim information; they stated that the files would be restored after additional redactions are made.

==== Misinformation and rumors ====
Following the release of the Epstein files, misinformation and disinformation related to the files spread on social media. One false rumor included skateboarder Tony Hawk, after a 2024 email from an FBI agent within the files stated "[Redacted] said that she was there when Prince Edward was there and when Tony Hawk got married on the island." Hawk disputed this rumor as "a narrative of nonsense", while sharing the four locations he has gotten married. AI-generated images also spread across social media, including one fictitious image of a young Zohran Mamdani with Epstein. Another included a fake image of Epstein with Nigel Farage, which was shared by the Wrexham Labour Party. Farage responded to the post, stating "I never met Epstein and I didn't go to the island"; while a spokesman for Reform UK described the post as "vile misinformation and smear". The Labour Party later deleted the post.

=== Reactions ===
U.S. Representative Ro Khanna expressed skepticism of Blanche's claim, noting that the U.S. Department of Justice had in fact "identified over 6 million potentially responsive pages." On February 1, 2026, Khanna repeated threats to charge Bondi with contempt of congress. Representative Thomas Massie responded to earlier criticism and efforts to stop the files' release, writing on X, "It was not a hoax, I cannot be bullied, I am not done, and this is why those in power are doing everything in their power to defeat me." U.S. President Donald Trump argued that the final file release "absolves" him of any wrongdoing, despite his name appearing over 3,000 times in the files. British Prime Minister Keir Starmer suggested that Mountbatten-Windsor should testify before U.S. Congress due to his presence within the files. Norwegian Prime Minister Jonas Gahr Støre agreed with Mette-Marit, Crown Princess of Norway's statement that she had "poor judgement", following further light on her association with Epstein. Støre similarly criticized former Prime Minister Thorbjørn Jagland.

In February 2026, the lawyers of Ghislaine Maxwell claimed releasing certain documents related to Maxwell would be unconstitutional, because some of the documents were under court protection orders. Laura Meinninger and Jeffrey Pagliuca state: “Congress cannot, by statute, strip this Court of the power or relieve it of the responsibility to protect its files from misuse. To do so violates the separation of powers,”

=== Aftermath ===
==== Congressional access to unredacted files ====
On February 6, 2026, news outlets reported that Assistant Attorney General Patrick Davis wrote a letter to all 535 members of Congress. Davis stated that beginning February 9, lawmakers would be allowed to view unredacted Epstein files, in a reading room at the Department of Justice. Congressional lawmakers are permitted to take notes on the files, but may not bring electronic devices with them. On February 8, Massie asked users on X to identify important redacted documents that he should view first.

On February 9, 2026, Massie and Khanna spoke to the press after their first reviewing of unredacted files at the Department of Justice. The pair criticized Bondi and the Department of Justice, accusing the latter of "breaking the law". On February 10, 2026, Khanna read the names of six men on the House floor, who appeared in the unredacted Epstein files. Khanna said that the six men are "likely incriminated" by their inclusion. By reading the names during a House session, Khanna and Massie are offered some degree of protection against potential defamation lawsuits. The six names included Leslie Wexner, Sultan Ahmed bin Sulayem, Salvatore Nuara, Zurab Mikeladze, Leonic Leonov, and Nicola Caputo. On February 13, Todd Blanche claimed in response to Khanna that the latter named "completely random people" that "have NOTHING to do with Epstein or Maxwell". Blanche stated that only Wexner and bin Sulayem held ties to Epstein, while the other four were an "unmasking of completely random people selected years ago for an FBI lineup- men and women." Khanna subsequently admitted his mistake, while placing blame on the Department of Justice. Khanna stated, "I wish DoJ had provided that explanation earlier instead of redacting then unredacting their names. They have failed to protect survivors, created confusion for innocent men, and have protected rich and powerful abusers." Massie also criticized Blanche, saying "Maybe you should have checked with your folks first, or provided some context, instead of trying to beat my TV appearance and then blaming us."

On February 9, 2026, Senator Cynthia Lummis said that after reviewing unredacted files, "now I see what the big deal is. And the members of Congress that have been pushing this were not wrong." That day, Representative Jamie Raskin also accused the Department of Justice of a coverup, after viewing some unredacted files. Raskin also claimed "[Trump’s] name, I think I put his name ... it appears more than a million times." On February 10, 2026, Representative Suhas Subramanyam gave an interview to NPR, where he discussed viewing unredacted files. That day, Representative Jared Moskowitz described the content of the files as "just gross". Moskowitz also stated that a list of Epstein's co-conspirators "would surprise (the public), because a lot of them were women". That day, House Speaker Mike Johnson stated that he intended to view unredacted files at a later date, while also defending the Department of Justice. On February 11, 2026, Representative Maxwell Frost viewed unredacted documents, after asking Reddit users to help identify ones of interest. Frost stated that he only "scratched the tip of the iceberg", but that a "lot of these did relate to Donald Trump."

==== Congressional hearings ====
Following the fifth file release, Howard Lutnick and Pam Bondi both testified before U.S. congress. Lutnick was questioned on his ties to Epstein, which he defended as limited. During Bondi's hearing, she faced bipartisan criticism over the Department of Justice's release of the files. Massie described the issue as "bigger than Watergate".

During the hearing, Bondi was also photographed with a document titled "Jayapal Pramila Search History". Congressional members expressed bipartisan outrage over the incident, accusing Bondi and the Department of Justice of spying on their search history of unredacted Epstein files. Representative Pramila Jayapal described it as "outrageous", while Representative Raskin called it an "outrageous abuse of power". Representative Nancy Mace called the document "disturbing...a form of intimidation, potentially", while House Speaker Johnson described it as inappropriate. The department subsequently acknowledged the incident, stating that the "DOJ logs all searches made on its systems to protect against the release of victim information." On February 13, 2026, House Democrats launched an investigation into the department, over the tracking of congressional file searches.

==== Section 3 report to Congress ====
On February 14, 2026, Bondi sent a six-page letter to congress, outlining the department's justification for redactions made in the Epstein files (as legally required). In the letter, Bondi also included a list of "all persons...[named] in the files released under the Act at least once...in a wide variety of contexts." The list included both individuals with direct ties to Epstein, as well as individuals mentioned only in passing once. The list included approximately 340 names.

Following the release of Bondi's report, Representative Khanna accused Bondi of "purposefully muddying the waters on who was a predator and who was mentioned in an email." On X, Khanna wrote, "To have Janis Joplin, who died when Epstein was 17, in the same list as Larry Nassar, who went to prison for the sexual abuse of hundreds of young women and child pornography, with no clarification of how either was mentioned in the files is absurd." Representative Mace attacked the report for "missing names", and wrote on X that "This isn’t going away until people go to jail."

==== Bondi subpoena ====
On March 4, 2026, the House Oversight Committee voted to subpoena Bondi to testify about how the Justice Department handled the investigation of Epstein and the release of the files. The subpoena was issued on March 17; she was scheduled to sit for a deposition on April 14. However, Trump announced on April 2 that he had fired Bondi, after which the Justice Department said she would not appear for the deposition. She was rescheduled for a transcribed interview on May 29 instead of a deposition.

On May 29, 2026, Bondi appeared before the House Oversight Committee, and reportedly blamed Todd Blanche for the chaotic rollout of the Epstein files. Representative Robert Garcia told reporters:

"She continues to push all of the investigation and the blame on Acting AG Todd Blanche..It was Todd Blanche, the current acting AG, that was leading the Epstein investigation, and quite frankly, all of the mistakes that we saw — the redactions, not protecting survivors — [Bondi] continues to push that back onto the acting AG Todd Blanche, who by the way was Donald Trump's personal lawyer."

Following the testimony, Bondi denied blaming Blanche, writing that "I praised Acting AG Blanche’s management of this Herculean task". An 111-page transcript of Bondi's testimony was later released to the public on June 4, 2026.

== Sixth release – March 5, 2026 ==
On March 5, 2026, the Department of Justice released an additional 16 pages of files, which were previously withheld. The Department claimed the files were improperly withheld due to being "incorrectly coded as duplicative". The files contained three 2019 FBI interview summaries with a woman, who had accused Trump of sexually abusing her between the ages of 13 and 15 in the 1980s.

Following the release, NPR reported that per their investigation, there still appears to be an additional 37 files missing from the department's public database.

=== Aftermath ===
In April 2026, the Justice Department's Office of the Inspector announced it would review the Justice Department's compliance with the Epstein Files Transparency Act and write a public report.

== Post-release effects ==
=== Asia ===
Country	Individual(s)	Result	Notes
United Arab Emirates	Sultan Ahmed bin Sulayem	Resignation	In February 2026, Bin Sulayem resigned as the chairman and CEO of DP World.

=== Europe ===
==== House of Lords ====
Following the revelation of Peter Mandelson's appearance in the Epstein files, renewed criticism against hereditary peers in the House of Lords emerged. Under the Starmer ministry, new legislation to abolish hereditary peerage emerged. While proposals to abolish hereditary peerage had long existed, Mandelson's actions gave renewed support to the proposal. The push received support from individuals such as Jenny Jones, Baroness Jones of Moulsecoomb, and criticism from lords including Charles Hay, 16th Earl of Kinnoull.

In March 2026, parliament voted to abolish hereditary peerage, pending royal assent from King Charles III. Minister Nick Thomas-Symonds described the move as an end to "an archaic and undemocratic principle." Conversely, Nicholas True, Baron True criticized the bill, saying "So, here we are at the end of well over seven centuries of service by hereditary peers in this Parliament...Many of those people, no doubt, were flawed but for the most part, they served their nation faithfully and well."

==== Starmer ministry ====
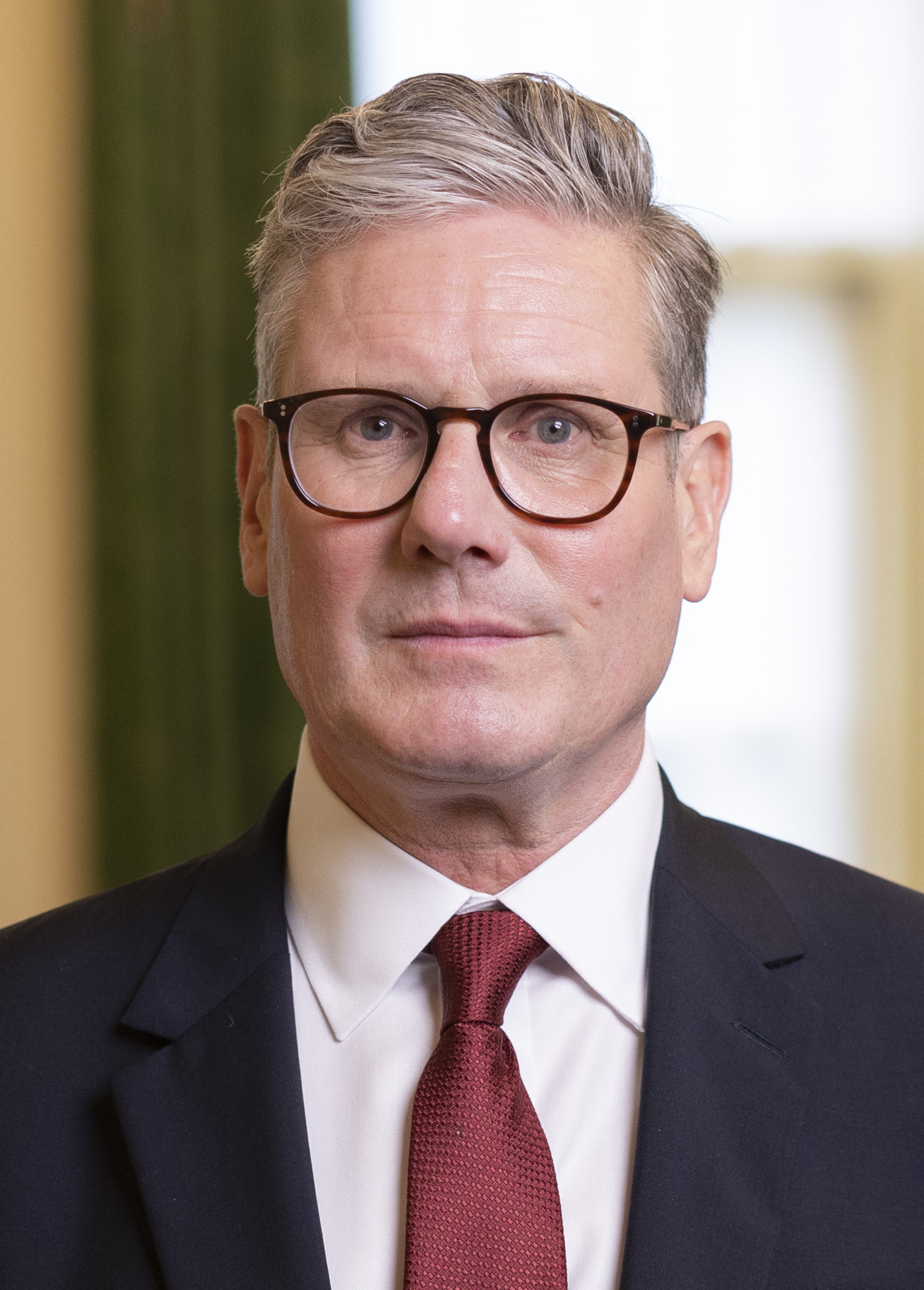
U.K. Prime Minister Keir Starmer

===== Peter Mandelson =====
On February 1, 2026, Peter Mandelson resigned his membership from the UK's Labour Party, following the January 30th document release. Files released by the Department of Justice showed that Epstein paid Mandelson $75,000 (£55,000), across three payments, between 2003 and 2004. In a public statement, Mandelson said, "Allegations which I believe to be false that [Epstein] made financial payments to me 20 years ago, and of which I have no record or recollection ... While doing this I do not wish to cause further embarrassment to the Labour Party and I am therefore stepping down from membership of the party." Mandelson is now set to be summoned before U.S. Congress to testify. On February 6, two of Mandelson's properties were searched by police as part of an Epstein probe in the country. On February 23, Mandelson was arrested on suspicion of misconduct, while in public office.

===== Morgan McSweeney =====
In February 2026, Morgan McSweeney resigned as the Downing Street Chief of Staff of Keir Starmer over his ties to Mandelson. Less than 24 hours after McSweeney's resignation, Tim Allan resigned as Starmer's Downing Street Director of Communications, further worsening Starmer's political situation.

===== Keir Starmer =====
Following Mandelson's and McSweeny's resignations, in February 2026, several prominent individuals began to pressure Starmer into resigning as Prime Minister of the United Kingdom. Most notably, Scottish Labour leader Anas Sarwar called on Starmer to step down, saying "too many mistakes" have been made. Kemi Badenoch, Conservative and Opposition leader, described Starmer's political end as "a matter of when, not if". Despite pressure, many Labour members came out in support of Starmer, including Angela Rayner, Wes Streeting, Ed Miliband, and Andy Burnham. Starmer remained defiant amidst calls to step down, saying that "never walk away from the country that I love". The BBC wrote that Starmer's position "remains fragile and the situation could change quickly", while Vox described Starmer as "hanging by a thread". In May 2026, a leadership crisis against Starmer developed. On June 22, 2026, Starmer announced his resignation from office, which was attributed to a multitude of factors.

==== Other ====
Country	Individual(s)	Result	Notes
France	Caroline Lang	Resignation	Lang resigned as the head of France's Independent Production Union, after the file release showed that she had ties to Epstein.
France	Jack Lang	Resignation	Lang faced calls to resign as the president of the Arab World Institute over his ties to Epstein. The foreign ministry stated it had summoned Lang to a Sunday meeting. He later resigned on February 7, 2026.
Norway	Børge Brende	Investigation	The World Economic Forum announced in February 2026 that they would investigate Norwegian WEF CEO Børge Brende over his ties to Epstein. The two individuals communicated over email between 2018 and 2019.
Norway	Mona Juul	Investigation	Norwegian ambassador Mona Juul was placed on administrative leave while her relationship with Epstein goes under investigation.
Norway	Thorbjørn Jagland	Criminal charges	In February 2026, Jagland was charged with "gross corruption" over his ties to Epstein. Økokrim stated that it will question Jagland as part of its investigation. If convicted, he could face up to ten years in prison.
Slovakia	Miroslav Lajčák	Resignation	Slovak national security advisor Miroslav Lajčák resigned from office following the release of the January 30, 2026 files. In a statement, Lajčák denied any wrongdoing, and stated that he chose to resign to avoid hurting Prime Minister Robert Fico.
United Kingdom	Nicole Junkermann	Resignation	Junkerman resigned from her roles as trustee of the Royal Marsden Cancer Charity and visiting professor at Lancaster University.
United Kingdom	Andrew Mountbatten-Windsor	Arrested	The former Duke of York, whose royal styles were stripped by King Charles III in 2025, moved out of the Royal Lodge in February 2026, following the release of the files. Plans for the move had begun in October 2025, but appeared hastened by the release. King Charles III soon announced that the British royal family would support the Thames Valley Police if they choose to investigate Mountbatten-Windsor. In the U.S., Democratic Representatives Ro Khanna and Teresa Leger Fernández called upon Charles III to take further action, and send his brother to testify before the Oversight Committee. On February 19, 2026, Mountbatten-Windsor was arrested by U.K. police, under suspicion of misconduct while in public office.

=== United States ===
==== Anti-Israel sentiment ====
The release of the Epstein files led to Anti-Israel sentiment among the American public, due in part to Epstein's ties with Ehud Barak and pro-Israel groups. Within the Epstein files, an October 2020 Los Angeles-FBI report said that a bureau source had become “convinced that Epstein was a co-opted Mossad agent". Additionally, in 2025, media sources reported that Epstein also claimed to have influenced the 2019 Israeli election, writing to Steve Bannon that he helped convince Barak to form the Democratic Union alliance.

Shortly before the release of the files, a November 2025 poll from University of Maryland/Ipsos found that 27% of American respondents believed Epstein collaborated with the Israeli government. Following the release of the files, Anti-Israel views become more prominent, with The Jerusalem Post arguing that the release of the Epstein files led to an increase in anti-Semitism.

==== Bill and Hillary Clinton ====
Following the partial release of some Epstein files, the Republican-led House Oversight Committee summoned the Clintons to testify before the committee. Bill Clinton has appeared in several photos with Epstein released in the files, and maintained a relationship with Epstein in the 1990s and early 2000s. Emails from 2011 and 2015 which were released in November 2025 revealed that Epstein personally denied that Bill Clinton ever visited his island.

In January, the Clintons announced that they would refuse to comply with a congressional subpoena, regarding an investigation into their ties to Jeffrey Epstein. In a statement, the Clintons called the committee's efforts "legally invalid". Following this, Oversight Chair Representative James Comer announced that he would begin contempt of Congress proceedings into the Clintons the following week. Comer added that "No one's accusing the Clintons of any wrongdoing. We just have questions." On January 21, 2026, the House Oversight panel voted 34–8 to advance a motion to hold Bill Clinton in contempt of congress; and 28–15 on the measure towards Hillary Clinton. Nine Democrats, including Lee, voted with Republicans to hold Bill Clinton in contempt, while three of the nine also voted in favor of the measure directed towards Hillary Clinton.

Following the success of the Oversight panel's votes, a vote could be undertaken by the full House of Representatives. If a vote had passed in the full House, a referral would have then been sent to the Department of Justice. According to Politico, an estimated 12 to 15 Democrats intended to vote with Republicans, if a full House vote materialized. Following this, the Department of Justice could have weighed prosecution against the Clintons.

Former U.S. Attorney John P. Fishwick Jr. argued that the Clintons are "in a very difficult position, because these cases are very straightforward". Fishwick compared the Clintons' actions to Steve Bannon and Peter Navarro, who were both indicted and imprisoned for contempt of congress. Legal expert Ross Garber further opined that the Clintons possess no legal defense for their actions, and should seek a deal to avoid federal prison; however, some of the Epstein Files documents which were released on January 30, 2026, revealed that Bill Clinton's ties to Epstein were previously investigated by the FBI, which even determined that some allegations against Clinton were unverified and not credible. Epstein was also revealed to have been asked to testify about his relationship with Clinton during a deposition which took place during Virginia Giuffre's lawsuit in September 2016, during which he invoked the Fifth Amendment.

On February 2, 2026, House Oversight Committee chair James Comer (R-Kentucky) declined the latest offer from the Clintons to testify. Later in the day, it was agreed that Bill and Hillary Clinton would testify before the House Oversight Committee, thus putting an end to the threat of a contempt vote. Hillary's deposition began on February 26, 2026.

==== Firing of Pam Bondi ====
On January 21, 2026, Democratic Representative Summer Lee introduced a congressional amendment to hold Pam Bondi in contempt of Congress, accusing her of "failing to comply" with the Epstein Files Transparency Act. Lee's amendment ultimately failed along party lines, 19–24.

In February 2026, Bondi testified before Congress over the files' release; her testimony drew bipartisan criticism. Alongside Democrats, many right-wing figures subsequently called on Bondi to resign or be impeached, including Greg Kelly, Carl Higbie, Erick Erickson, Kyle Rittenhouse, and Nick Fuentes.

On April 2, 2026, Trump fired Bondi, reportedly due to her handling of the Epstein files, as well as her inability to secure federal indictments. Following this, Deputy Attorney General Todd Blanche then became acting Attorney General on an interim basis. According to The Wall Street Journal, Trump told Bondi one day before her firing, "I think it's time." Media sources subsequently speculated on who Trump would appoint as Attorney General, with Lee Zeldin widely mentioned as a strong possibility. Other contenders included Blanche (as a permanent appointment), Harmeet Dhillon, Jeanine Pirro, Eric Schmitt, Ron DeSantis, Ken Paxton, Mike Lee, Jay Clayton, and Jeffrey Clark.

After Bondi's firing, Representative Massie praised Trump's decision. He also wrote to Blanche on X, saying "Congratulations AG Blanche. Now you have 30 days to release the rest of the files before becoming criminally liable for failure to comply with the Epstein Files Transparency Act." That day, while on Fox News, Blanche was asked by host Jesse Watters if he would agree with Watters that the release of the Epstein files was not handled well. Blanche replied:

"Look, the Epstein files has been a saga that’s lasted for the entire for the past year, and what happened when the president signed the transparency act is the Department of Justice has now released all the files with respect to the Epstein saga and the attorney general...And so I think that to the extent that the Epstein files was a part of the past year of this Justice Department, it should not be a part of anything going forward."

On April 14, Blanche claimed the Justice Department had released everything the law required.

Fox News later reported that Blanche expressed his desire to Trump to serve as the permanent Attorney General; Trump reportedly told Blanche to treat his time in an acting status as an "audition". On June 4, 2026, Trump announced at a closed-door meeting that he would nominate Blanche to serve as the permanent Attorney General.

==== House Republicans ====
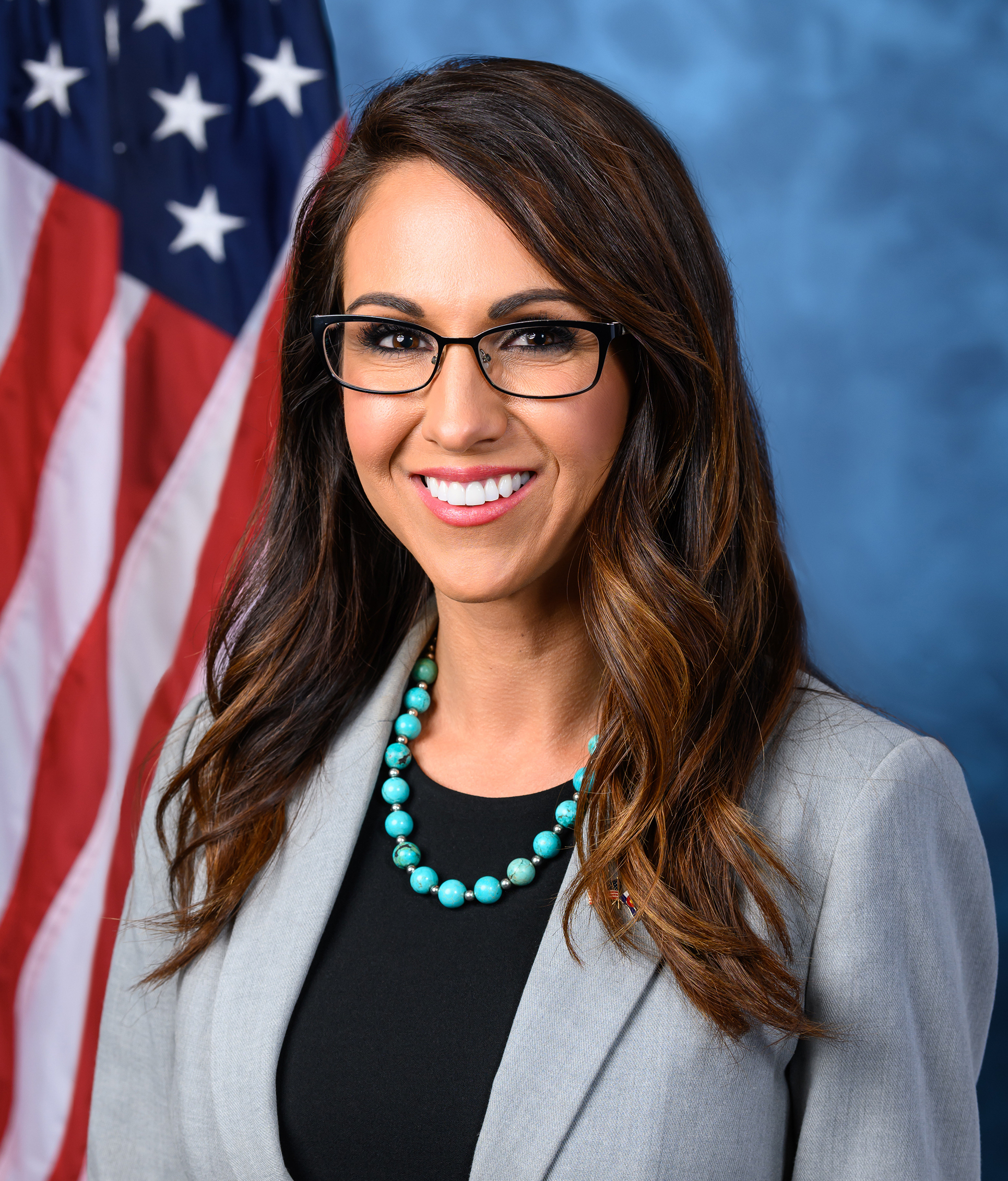
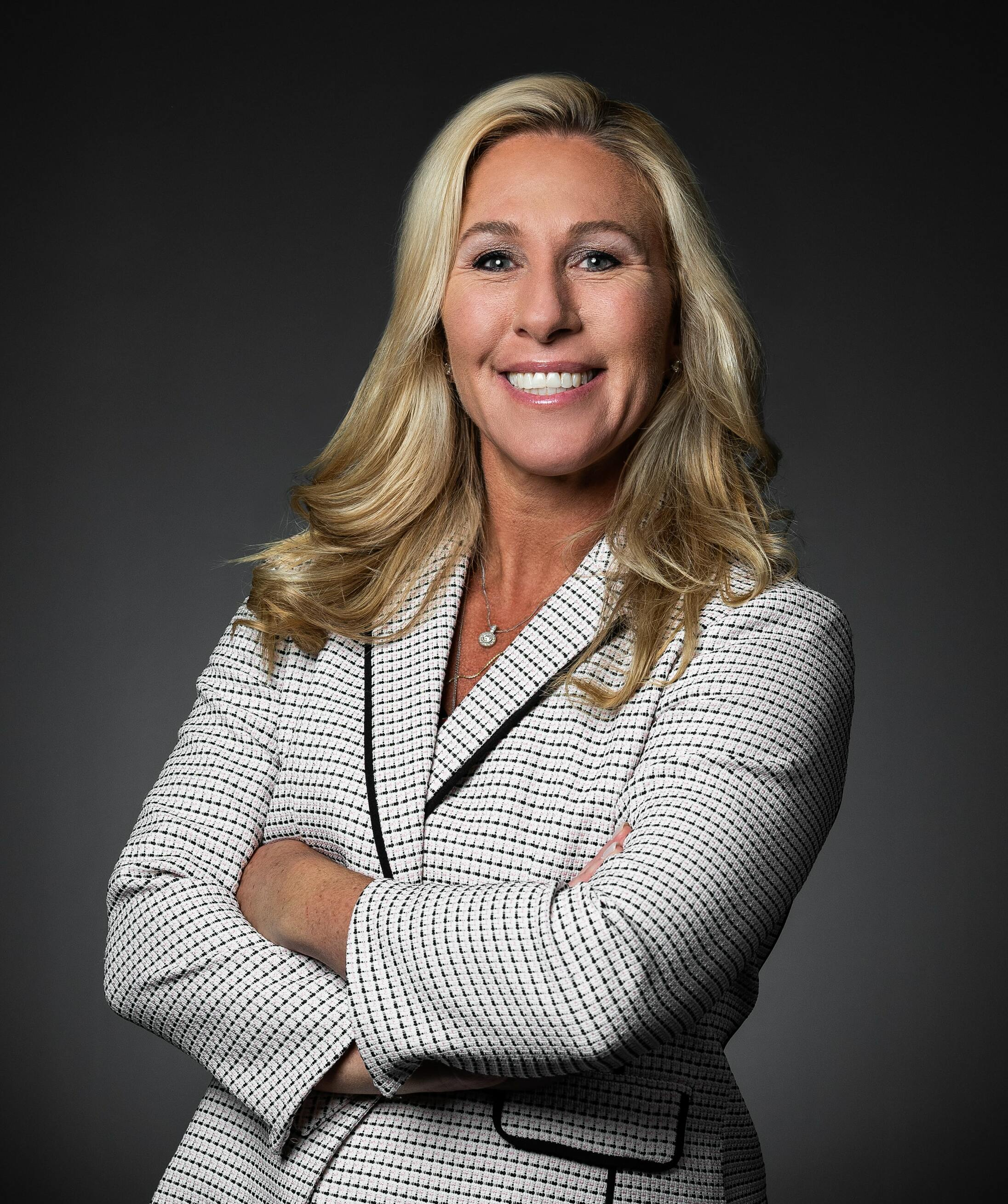
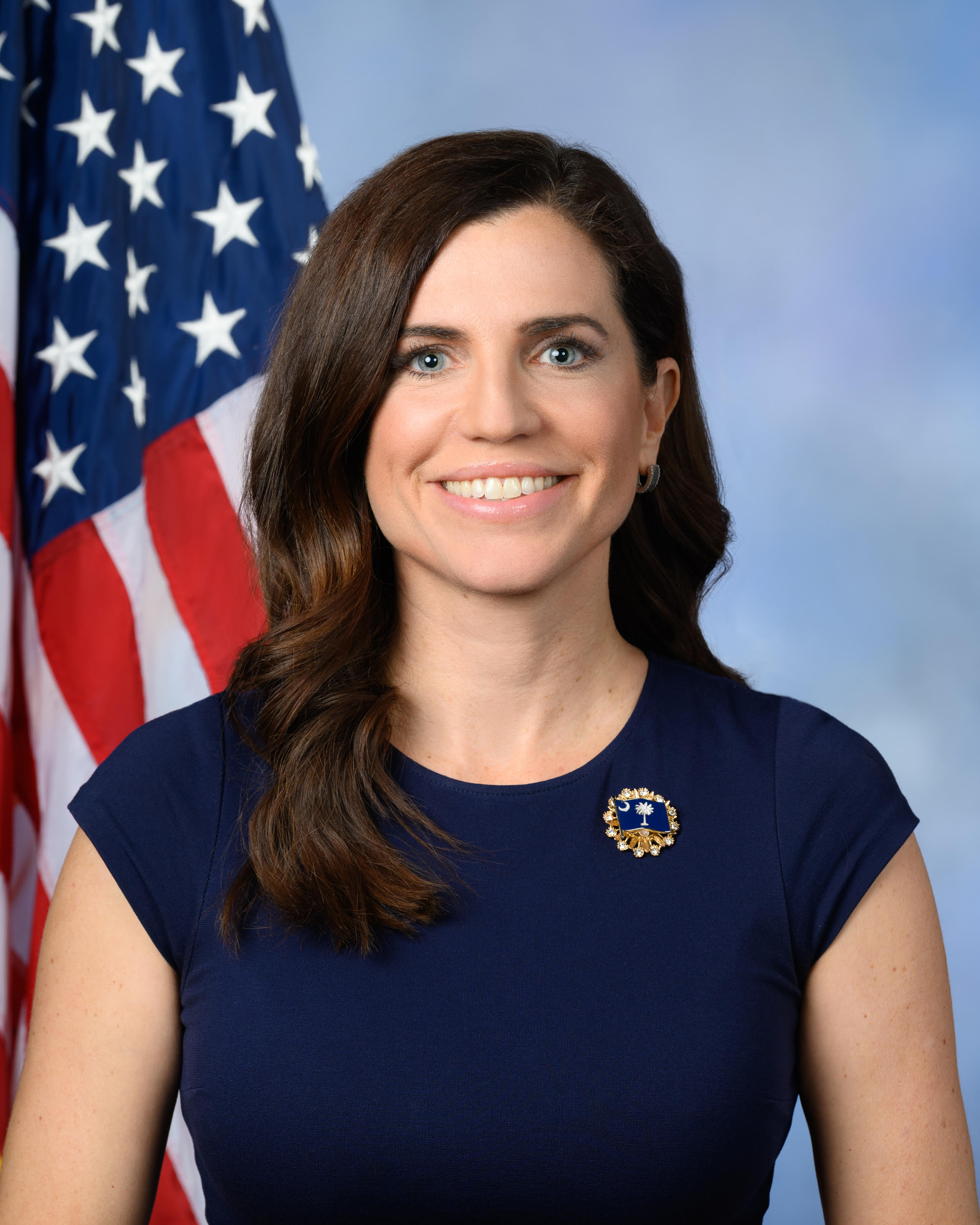
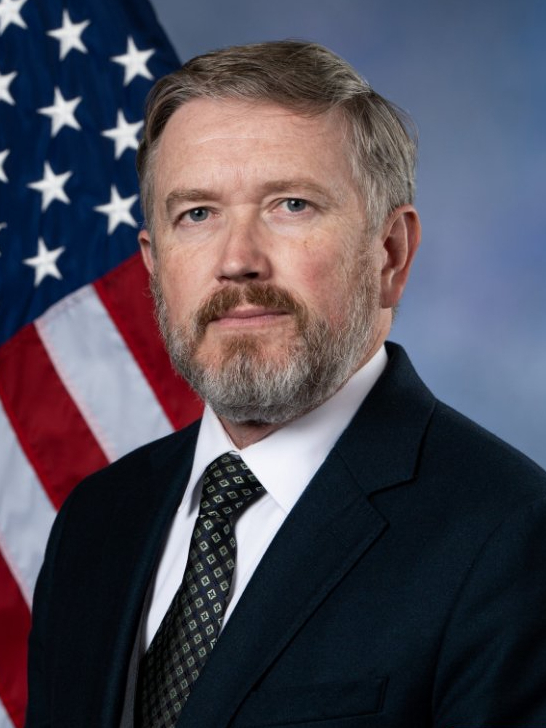
Lauren Boebert (top left), Marjorie Taylor Greene (top right), Nancy Mace (bottom left), and Thomas Massie (bottom right)

Following the successful passage of the Epstein Files Transparency Act, Trump began to publicly target the four Republican congresspeople who supported the discharge petition. As of June 2026, one has resigned, while two others have lost their primary races.

Massie has opined that "Boebert, Greene and Mace have paid an enormous price for doing the right thing". Conversely, CNN wrote that "It’s too simple to reduce Mace, Greene and Massie’s loss of power to the Epstein files."

===== Lauren Boebert =====
In May 2026, Trump indicated he would support a primary challenger against Lauren Boebert in 2028.

In November 2026, Boebert lost re-election to Democratic politician Eileen Laubacher, despite her district being redrawn to be more conservative than in previous elections.

===== Marjorie Taylor Greene =====
In 2025, Trump began to target Representative Marjorie Taylor Greene due to their falling out over the Epstein files, with Trump branding her a "traitor" and "whacky". In November 2025, Greene announced that she would resign from Congress on January 5, 2026. Since leaving office, Greene has become a critic of Trump, and has called for him to be removed from office through the Twenty-fifth Amendment.

===== Nancy Mace =====
Representative Nancy Mace ran as a candidate in the 2026 South Carolina gubernatorial election, but lost and placed fifth. Trump endorsed candidate Pamela Evette over Mace in the primary; which Mace attributed to her support for releasing the files, saying "If sacrificing my values is the price of an endorsement, I will never pay it".

===== Thomas Massie =====
In May 2026, Representative Thomas Massie lost re-election in his Republican primary, against challenger Ed Gallrein. Massie's re-election campaign was targeted by President Trump, due in part to Massie's role in releasing the Epstein Files. In November 2025, Massie accused the Israeli government of seeking to block the release of the Epstein files, and accused Epstein of having ties to Israel, stating:

"I think Israel is influencing the Epstein file release because Israeli intelligence and our own CIA was wrapped up with Epstein, and so it would be embarrassing to our own intelligence agencies as well as Israel’s intelligence agencies for all that to come out."

Massie's accusation that Epstein held close ties to Israel had previously been shared by Representative Marjorie Taylor Greene and conservative commentator Tucker Carlson.

Massie's primary was the most expensive U.S. House primary in American history, exceeding $32 million; pro-Israel interest groups accounted for over $9 million of the spending against Massie. Massie described his election as a "referendum" on Israel. Following Massie's re-election loss, pro-Israel Republican representatives Randy Fine and Don Bacon accused Massie of antisemitism.

==== Proposed legislation ====
In February 2026, Congressional Democrats introduced Virginia’s Law, proposed legislation named in honor of Epstein victim Virginia Giuffre. The bill would end the statute of limitations and jurisdiction restrictions for civil sexual abuse cases.

In March 2026, Democratic Representative Debbie Wasserman Schultz filed the No Escaping Justice Act. The proposed legislation would levy sanctions on foreign nationals who are implicated in the Epstein files.

===== Epstein Files Transparency Act II =====
Epstein Files Transparency Act II
- Long title: An act to amend the Epstein Files Transparency Act with respect to enforcement by an attorney general of a State, and for other purposes.
- Number of co-sponsors: 7

Codification
- Acts amended: Epstein Files Transparency Act

Legislative history
- Introduced in the House as H. R. 9694 by Thomas Massie (R–KY) on July 15, 2026

In July 2026, Massie introduced the Epstein Files Transparency Act II (Res. 9694) into the U.S. House of Representatives. Ro Khanna and Teresa Leger Fernández co-sponsored the bill and Jeff Merkley and Ben Ray Luján intend to introduce a Senate version of it. The bill aims to empower state attorneys general to challenge the DOJ in courts (for the latter's failure to comply with the original text of the law), allow Congressional members and victims to sue the DOJ, ban the invocation of the DOJ's common law privileges, and allow victims and prosecutors to obtain select unredacted files.

On November 11, 2026, Massie announced that he had secured 218 signatures on a discharge petition to force a House vote on Act II. In addition to all Democrats, three other Republicans signed Massie's discharge petition: Brian Fitzpatrick, Nancy Mace, and Ralph Norman.

==== Zorro Ranch ====
In February 2026, New Mexico announced that would investigate Zorro Ranch, a property owned by Epstein from 1993 until his death in 2019, due to the release of the Epstein files. Within the files, a 2019 email alleged Epstein had the bodies of two foreign girls buried outside of Zorro Ranch. State Representative Andrea Romero added that there were reports "of bodies being buried, of folks being trafficked."

On March 12, 2026, New Mexico Attorney General Raúl Torrez announced that the state Department of Justice reopened criminal investigations into Zorro Ranch.

In April 2026, politicians including State Representative Marianna Anaya and Representative Melanie Stansbury claimed that several male Epstein survivors had come forward in connection to Zorro Ranch. In a 60 Minutes (Australian) episode, Stansbury stated that a male victim told her that "multiple young men...[were] raped at the ranch in front of him after he was drugged".

==== Other ====
Country	Individual(s)	Result	Notes
United States	Peter Attia	Resignation	On February 2, 2026, Attia resigned from his role as chief science officer of David Protein. Additionally, CBS News pulled a 60 Minutes segment from October 2025 featuring Attia from future reruns.
United States	Richard Axel	Resignation	On February 24, 2026, Axel resigned as co-director of Columbia University's Mortimer B. Zuckerman Mind Brain Behavior Institute. He also resigned as investigator for the Howard Hughes Medical Institute.
United States	Leon Botstein	Resignation	On May 1, 2026, Botstein announced that he would step down as president of Bard College at the end of the academic year. Documents released by the DOJ appeared to show that Botstein held a friendship with Epstein, which he denied.
United States	Mariette DiChristina	Other	In February 2026, Boston University's student newspaper The Daily Free Press reported that former editor-in-chief of Scientific American and current dean of the Boston University College of Communication, Mariette DiChristina, had exchanged emails with Epstein in 2014 and 2015. These emails, released by the DOJ, showed that DiChristina and Epstein made plans for an in-person meeting in Manhattan in July 2014 and scheduled phone calls. DiChristina also asked Epstein to attend an editorial meeting at Scientific American. All of this communication occurred after Epstein had pleaded guilty in 2008 to soliciting a minor for prostitution and registered as a sex offender, which received much press coverage at the time. After their July 29, 2014 meeting, DiChristina wrote in an email to a recipient, whose name was redacted, that she was "inspired to help him with his worthy goals."
United States	Bill Gates	Other	In June 2026, Gates testified before the U.S. House Committee on Oversight and Government Reform about his relationship with Epstein.
United States	David Gelernter	Investigation	Computer scientist Gelernter was placed under investigation by Yale University as they review his ties to Epstein.
United States	Dean Kamen	Resignation	On February 1, 2026, the board of international youth organization FIRST placed founder and president Dean Kamen on immediate leave, following the appearance of his name in the January 30th file release. In a statement, Kamen stated: "Jeffrey Epstein reached out to me to become involved in my projects to bring clean water and distributed power to developing countries ... Given what I know now, I of course regret even those limited interactions." On March 11, FIRST announced that their investigation found no evidence of misconduct by Kamen, and that he chose to voluntarily resign from the board.
United States	Brad S. Karp	Resignation	Karp resigned as chairman of law firm Paul, Weiss, Rifkind, Wharton & Garrison, in February 2026. Karp had emailed Epstein in 2015, after thanking the latter for hosting an evening with him.
United States	Bob Kerrey	Resignation	Kerry, the former Governor of Nebraska (1983-1987), resigned as board chair from Monolith, a Nebraskan energy company, in February 2026.
United States	Howard Lutnick	Other	On February 8, 2026, Representative Thomas Massie publicly called on Lutnick to resign as the U.S. Secretary of Commerce over his ties to Epstein. Massie's calls were echoed by several Democrats, including Senator Adam Schiff, Senator Jacky Rosen, Senator Jeff Merkley, and Representative Robert Garcia. The White House rejected these calls, defending Lutnick. On February 10, Lutnick testified before U.S. senators, admitting that he had met with Epstein in 2012, but claiming he was unaware of any sex crimes.
United States	George J. Mitchell	Other	The US–Ireland Alliance announced that they would rename the Mitchell Scholarship. The scholarship derives its name from U.S. Senator George J. Mitchell, whose connections with Epstein were further exposed by the document release. A statement was released on Mitchell's behalf, arguing that Mitchell "had no knowledge of Epstein's actions involving underage girls". The following day, Queen's University Belfast cut ties with Mitchell.
United States	Thomas Pritzker	Resignation	Pritzker, a cousin of Illinois Governor JB Pritzker, resigned as the executive chair of Hyatt. Released files show that Pritzker communicated with Epstein over email to discuss girls.
United States	David A. Ross	Resignation	On February 3, 2026, Ross resigned from his role as Chair of the New York School of Visual Arts following revelations of his ties to Epstein.
United States	Kathryn Ruemmler	Resignation	On February 13, 2026, Ruemmler resigned from her position as Chief Legal Officer and General Counsel at Goldman Sachs over her links to Epstein.
United States	Lawrence Summers	Resignation	On February 25, 2026, Summers announced that he would resign from his professorship at Harvard University at the end of the 2025-26 academic year due to continuing fallout from revelations of his relationship with Epstein. Summers had already gone on leave from his teaching duties and from being director of the Mossavar-Rahmani Center for Business and Government at Harvard in November 2025 for the same reason. He had also resigned from the board of artificial intelligence company OpenAI in November 2025 for the same reason.
United States	Casey Wasserman	Other	Wasserman faced several calls to resign from the Los Angeles Organizing Committee for the 2028 Olympic and Paralympic Games following the files release, including from politicians Janice Hahn, Kenneth Mejia, and Monica Rodriguez. Following a review, the Olympics board announced that Wasserman would remain chairman of the committee. Several musicians and athletes repeated these calls and publicly cut ties with the Wasserman sports marketing and talent agency of which Wasserman was founder and CEO, including Bethany Cosentino, Chappell Roan, Abby Wambach, John Summit, Orville Peck, Dropkick Murphys, and Wednesday, among others. On February 13, Wasserman announced plans to sell the agency due to "past personal mistakes".

== Reactions ==
=== Journalists ===
In an opinion article in The Hill, journalist and attorney Chris Traux argued that the Epstein files were "a political albatross hanging around [Trump's] neck", while being Trump's equivalent of the Hillary Clinton email controversy. Traux also argued that the bill's overwhelming success in Congress showcased the weakened influence of Trump's political power. Contributor A. Scott Bolden similarly argued in The Hill that Trump's initial opposition to the bill proved to be a failure, while arguing that Bondi's new investigations were Trump's eleventh-hour attempt to withhold select files. Contributor John Mac Ghlionn also argued in The Hill that Trump's initial failure to release the Epstein Files could "destroy whatever legacy he hoped to leave behind", and is partially responsible for the increasing popularity of far-right commentator Nick Fuentes, a critic of Trump.

Journalist Harrison Berger in The American Conservative argued that the bill granted too much power to Bondi to redact content while releasing the Epstein files. Berger argued that the Trump administration would likely abuse the bill's provision in order to hide Epstein's political and foreign ties. For example, Berger pointed to Drop Site News's report that Epstein worked on Israel's behalf with Ehud Barak during the Syrian civil war in order to help remove Bashar al-Assad from power.

Following the files' release, contributor Robby Soave argued in The Hill that the releases had led to association fallacy among the general public. Soave praised Massie's "sincere effort to arrive at the truth", while also arguing that many of Epstein's minor associates likely had no knowledge of his crimes, and were being unfairly punished in the court of public opinion.

Attorney Daniel Richman argued in The New York Times that "The Epstein Files Should Never Have Been Released"; Richman argued that the files' release was ultimately a result of the justice system's failure to prosecute Epstein's associates.

=== Public opinion ===
A September 2025 Marist Poll, surveying 1,477 adult Americans, found that 90% of Americans answered that they wanted at least some of the Epstein files released, with the victims' names redacted. Among these surveyed, 77% stated that they wanted all of the Epstein files to be released, 13% wanted some of the files released, and 9% were opposed. Additionally, 84% of Democrats, 67% of Republicans, and 83% of independents answered that they wanted all of the Epstein files to be released.

A December 2025 Economist/YouGov poll, surveying 1,591 Americans, found that 55% of Americans disapproved of Trump's handling of the Epstein investigation, while only 26% approved. Additionally, the poll found that 91% of Democrats, 78% of Independents, and 74% of Republicans supported releasing the Epstein files.

A January 2026 Economist/YouGov poll, surveying 1,546 Americans, found that 56% of Americans disapproved of Trump's handling of the files, while 25% approved. Additionally, 49% of Americans answered that Trump is attempting to cover up Epstein's crimes, while 30% answered that he is not. A January 2026 CNN poll, surveying 1,209 adult Americans, found that only 6% said they're satisfied with what the federal government had so far released. Nearly half of Republicans, three-quarters of independents, and 9 in 10 Democrats said the government was withholding information.

== See also ==
- "Epstein didn't kill himself" ("EDKH")
- Pedophile Protection Party
- Executive Order 14176
- President John F. Kennedy Assassination Records Collection Act of 1992
- List of people named in the Epstein files
