= List of Department of Justice appointments by Donald Trump =

Key
Appointees serving in offices that did not require Senate confirmation.
Appointees confirmed by the Senate who are currently serving or served through the entire term.
Appointees awaiting Senate confirmation.
Appointees serving in an acting capacity.
Appointees who have left office after confirmation or offices which have been disbanded.
Nominees who were withdrawn prior to being confirmed or assuming office.

== Appointments (first administration) ==
Office	Nominee	Assumed office	left office
Attorney General
Attorney General	William Barr	February 14, 2019 (Confirmed February 14, 2019, 54–45)	December 23, 2020
Attorney General	Matthew Whitaker	November 7, 2018	February 14, 2019
Attorney General	Jeff Sessions	February 8, 2017 (Confirmed February 8, 2017, 52–47)	November 7, 2018
Deputy Attorney General	Jeffrey A. Rosen	May 22, 2019 (Confirmed May 16, 2019, 52–45)	January 20, 2021
Deputy Attorney General	Rod Rosenstein	April 26, 2017 (Confirmed April 25, 2017, 94–6)	May 11, 2019
Associate Attorney General	Claire McCusker Murray	May 14, 2019	January 20, 2021
Associate Attorney General	Jesse Panuccio	February 21, 2018	May 3, 2019
Associate Attorney General	Rachel Brand	May 22, 2017 (Confirmed May 18, 2017, 52–46)	February 20, 2018
Solicitor General	Jeff Wall	July 3, 2020	January 20, 2021
Solicitor General	Jeff Wall	March 10, 2017	September 19, 2017
Solicitor General	Noel Francisco	September 19, 2017 (Confirmed September 19, 2017, 50–47)	July 3, 2020
Solicitor General	Noel Francisco	January 23, 2017	March 10, 2017
Assistant Attorney General (Antitrust Division)	Makan Delrahim	September 28, 2017 (Confirmed September 27, 2017, 73–21)	January 20, 2021
Assistant Attorney General (Civil Division)	Ethan P. Davis	July 4, 2020	September 11, 2020
Assistant Attorney General (Civil Division)	Jody Hunt	September 4, 2018 (Confirmed August 28, 2017, 72–23)	July 3, 2020
Assistant Attorney General (Civil Rights)	Eric Dreiband	October 12, 2018 (Confirmed October 11, 2018, 50–47)	January 8, 2021
Assistant Attorney General (Criminal Division)	Brian Rabbitt	July 3, 2020	December 24, 2020
Assistant Attorney General (Criminal Division)	Brian Benczkowski	July 16, 2018 (Confirmed July 11, 2018, 51–48)	July 3, 2020
Assistant Attorney General (Environment and Natural Resources Division)	Jeffrey Clark	November 1, 2018 (Confirmed October 11, 2018, 52–45)	January 21, 2021
Assistant Attorney General (National Security Division)	John Demers	February 22, 2018 (Confirmed February 15, 2018, voice vote)	January 20, 2021
Assistant Attorney General (Tax Division)	Richard E. Zuckerman	Nomination lapsed and returned to the President on January 3, 2021	
Assistant Attorney General (Tax Division)	Richard E. Zuckerman	2017	2021
Assistant Attorney General (Office of Legal Counsel)	Steven Engel	November 13, 2017 (Confirmed November 7, 2017, 51–47)	January 20, 2021
Assistant Attorney General (Office of Legal Policy)	Beth Ann Williams	August 21, 2017 (Confirmed August 3, 2017, voice vote)	December 11, 2020
Assistant Attorney General (Office of Legislative Affairs)	Stephen Boyd	September 5, 2017 (Confirmed August 3, 2017, voice vote)	January 20, 2021
Bureau of Alcohol, Tobacco, Firearms and Explosives
Director of the Bureau of Alcohol, Tobacco, Firearms and Explosives	Regina Lombardo	May 1, 2019	June 3, 2021
Director of the Bureau of Alcohol, Tobacco, Firearms and Explosives	Kenneth Charles Canterbury Jr.	Nomination withdrawn by the President on February 28, 2017	
Federal Bureau of Investigation
Director of the Federal Bureau of Investigation	Christopher A. Wray	August 2, 2017 (Confirmed August 1, 2017, 92–5)	January 19, 2025
Federal Bureau of Prisons
Director of the Federal Bureau of Prisons
Director of the Federal Bureau of Prisons	Kathleen Hawk Sawyer	August 19, 2019	February 25, 2020
Director of the Federal Bureau of Prisons	Hugh Hurwitz	May 2018	August 19, 2019
Director of the Federal Bureau of Prisons	Mark Inch	September 18, 2017	May 18, 2018
Member of the Board of Directors of the Federal Prison Industries	Deline R. Reardon	March 5, 2018	
Office of Justice Programs
Assistant Attorney General (Office of Justice Programs)	Katharine Sullivan	Nomination lapsed and returned to the President on January 3, 2021	
Assistant Attorney General (Office of Justice Programs)	Katharine Sullivan	June 2019	January 20, 2021
Assistant Attorney General (Office of Justice Programs)	Laura Rogers	July 2018	October 2018
Director of the Bureau of Justice Assistance	Jon Adler	December 11, 2017 (Appointed September 15, 2017)	September 16, 2019
Director of the Bureau of Justice Statistics	Jeffrey H. Anderson	November 2017	January 20, 2021
Director of the National Institute of Justice	David B. Muhlhausen	August 22, 2017 (Appointed July 11, 2017)	January 20, 2021
Director of the Office for Victims of Crime	Darlene Hutchinson Biehl	August 14, 2017 (Appointed July 1, 2017)	December 2019
Administrator of the Office of Juvenile Justice and Delinquency Prevention	Caren Harp	January 19, 2018 (Appointed December 18, 2017)	January 20, 2021
Director of the Office of Sex Offender Sentencing, Monitoring, Apprehending, Registering, and Tracking	Laura Rogers	January 4, 2018 (Appointed October 5, 2017)	July 2019
Office on Violence Against Women
Director of the Office of Violence Against Women	Laura Rogers	July 2019	January 2021
Foreign Claims Settlement Commission
Member of the Foreign Claims Settlement Commission	Patrick Hovakimian	June 4, 2018 (Confirmed May 10, 2018, voice vote)	
United States Marshals Service
Director of the United States Marshals Service	Donald W. Washington	March 29, 2019 (Confirmed March 14, 2018, voice vote)	September 27, 2021
Director of Community Relations Service	Gerri Ratliff	June 15, 2018	May 2022
Drug Enforcement Administration
Administrator of the Drug Enforcement Administration	Timothy Shea	May 19, 2020	January 20, 2021
Administrator of the Drug Enforcement Administration	Uttam Dhillon	July 2, 2018	May 18, 2020
Administrator of the Drug Enforcement Administration	Robert W. Patterson	October 1, 2017	July 2, 2018

== Appointments (second administration) ==
Office	Nominee	Assumed office	Left office
Attorney General	Todd Blanche	August 10, 2026 (Confirmed August 8, 2026, 50–49)	
Attorney General	Todd Blanche	April 2, 2026	August 10, 2026
Attorney General	Pam Bondi	February 5, 2025 (Confirmed February 4, 2025, 54–46)	April 2, 2026
Attorney General	James McHenry	January 20, 2025	February 5, 2025
Deputy Attorney General	Trent McCotter	August 10, 2026	
Deputy Attorney General	Todd Blanche	March 6, 2025 (Confirmed March 5, 2025, 52–46)	August 10, 2026
Deputy Attorney General	Emil Bove	January 20, 2025	March 6, 2025
Associate Attorney General	Stanley Woodward	November 14, 2025 (Confirmed* October 7, 2025, 51–47); *En bloc confirmation of 107 nominees.	
Solicitor General	Dean John Sauer	April 4, 2025 (Confirmed April 3, 2025, 52–45)	
Solicitor General	Sarah M. Harris	January 20, 2025	April 4, 2025
Assistant Attorney General for the Antitrust Division	D. Adam Candeub	Awaiting Senate Confirmation	
Assistant Attorney General for the Antitrust Division	Omeed Assefi	February 12, 2026	June 29, 2026
Assistant Attorney General for the Antitrust Division	Gail Slater	March 12, 2025 (Confirmed March 11, 2025, 78–19)	February 12, 2026
Assistant Attorney General for the Antitrust Division	Omeed Assefi	January 20, 2025	March 12, 2025
Assistant Attorney General for the Civil Division	Jonathan Guynn	November 9, 2026	
Assistant Attorney General for the Civil Division	Brett Shumate	June 11, 2025 (Confirmed June 9, 2025, 51–41)	November 9, 2026
Assistant Attorney General for the Civil Division	Yaakov M. Ruth	January 20, 2025	June 11, 2025
Assistant Attorney General for the Civil Rights Division	Craig Trainor	November 5, 2026	
Assistant Attorney General for the Civil Rights Division	Harmeet Dhillon	April 7, 2025 (Confirmed April 3, 2025, 52–45)	November 5, 2026
Assistant Attorney General for the Civil Rights Division	Mac Warner	January 20, 2025	April 7, 2025
Assistant Attorney General for the National Security Division	John Eisenberg	June 5, 2025 (Confirmed June 5, 2025, 52–43)	November 6, 2026
Assistant Attorney General for the Office of Legal Policy	Daniel E. Burrows	February 17, 2026 (Confirmed February 10, 2026, 52–46)	
Assistant Attorney General for the Office of Legal Policy	Aaron Reitz	March 31, 2025 (Confirmed March 26, 2025, 52–46)	June 11, 2025
Assistant Attorney General for the Office of Legislative Affairs	Patrick Davis	October 16, 2025 (Confirmed* October 7, 2025, 51–47); *En bloc confirmation of 107 nominees.	October 31, 2026
Assistant Attorney General for the Office of Legislative Affairs	Dario Camacho	February 19, 2025	July 2025
Assistant Attorney General for the Office of Legislative Affairs	Patrick D. Davis	January 20, 2025	February 19, 2025
Assistant Attorney General for the Office of Legal Counsel	T. Elliot Gaiser	August 4, 2025 (Confirmed July 30, 2025, 53–45)	
Assistant Attorney General for the Office of Legal Counsel	Henry C. Whitaker	January 20, 2025	August 4, 2025
Assistant Attorney General for the Criminal Division	Andrew Duva	December 23, 2025 (Confirmed* December 18, 2025, 53–43); *En bloc confirmation of 97 nominees.	
Assistant Attorney General for the Criminal Division	Matthew R. Galeotti	March 18, 2025	December 23, 2025
Assistant Attorney General for the National Fraud Enforcement Division	Colin McDonald	April 1, 2026 (Confirmed March 24, 2026, 52–47)	
Assistant Attorney General for the Environment and Natural Resources Division	Adam Gustafson	January 20, 2025	
Assistant Attorney General for the Office of Justice Programs	Arthur Kleinschmidt	Awaiting Senate Confirmation	
Assistant Attorney General for the Office of Justice Programs	Konstantinos Ligris	Nomination withdrawn by the President on July 14, 2026	
Inspector General of the United States Department of Justice	Don Richard Berthiaume, Jr.	August 14, 2026 (Confirmed* August 7, 2026, 51–47); *En bloc confirmation of 74 nominees.	
Inspector General of the United States Department of Justice	William M. Blier	January 26, 2026	May 29, 2026
Principal Associate Deputy Attorney General	Trent McCotter	April 9, 2026	
Principal Associate Deputy Attorney General	Emil Bove	January 20, 2025	September 2, 2025
Chief of Staff to the Attorney General	Chad Mizelle	January 20, 2025	October 2025
Senior Counsel to the Assistant Attorney General (Civil Rights Division)	Leo Terrell	January 20, 2025	
United States Pardon Attorney	Ed Martin	May 15, 2025	
Bureau of Alcohol, Tobacco, Firearms and Explosives
Director of the Bureau of Alcohol, Tobacco, Firearms and Explosives	Robert Cekada	April 30, 2026 (Confirmed April 29, 2026, 59–39)	
Director of the Bureau of Alcohol, Tobacco, Firearms and Explosives	Daniel P. Driscoll	April 10, 2025	April 30, 2026
Director of the Bureau of Alcohol, Tobacco, Firearms and Explosives	Kash Patel	February 24, 2025	April 10, 2025
Federal Bureau of Investigation
Director of the Federal Bureau of Investigation	Kash Patel	February 21, 2025 (Confirmed February 20, 2025, 51–49)	
Director of the Federal Bureau of Investigation	Brian Driscoll	January 20, 2025	February 21, 2025
Deputy Director of the Federal Bureau of Investigation
Deputy Director of the Federal Bureau of Investigation	Christopher Raia	January 12, 2026	
Deputy Director of the Federal Bureau of Investigation	Andrew Bailey	September 15, 2025	
Deputy Director of the Federal Bureau of Investigation	Dan Bongino	March 17, 2025	January 3, 2026
Deputy Director of the Federal Bureau of Investigation	Robert Kissane	January 20, 2025	March 17, 2025
Director of the Federal Bureau of Prisons	William Marshall III	April 21, 2025	
United States Marshals Service
Director of the United States Marshals Service	Gadyaces Serralta	August 1, 2025 (Confirmed July 31, 2025, 59–39)	
Director of the United States Marshals Service	Mark Pitella	January 20, 2025	July 31, 2025
Drug Enforcement Administration
Administrator of the Drug Enforcement Administration	Terry Cole	July 24, 2025 (Confirmed July 22, 2025, 50–47)	
Administrator of the Drug Enforcement Administration	Robert Murphy	May 2, 2025	July 24, 2025
Administrator of the Drug Enforcement Administration	Derek S. Maltz	January 20, 2025	May 2, 2025
United States Parole Commission
Commissioner of the United States Parole Commission	Stephen Husk	Awaiting Senate Confirmation	

== Notes ==
=== Confirmation votes ===
Confirmations by roll call vote (first administration)

Confirmations by voice vote (first administration)

Confirmations by roll call vote (second administration)

Confirmations by voice vote (second administration)
