= Omeed Assefi =

U.S. assistant attorney general

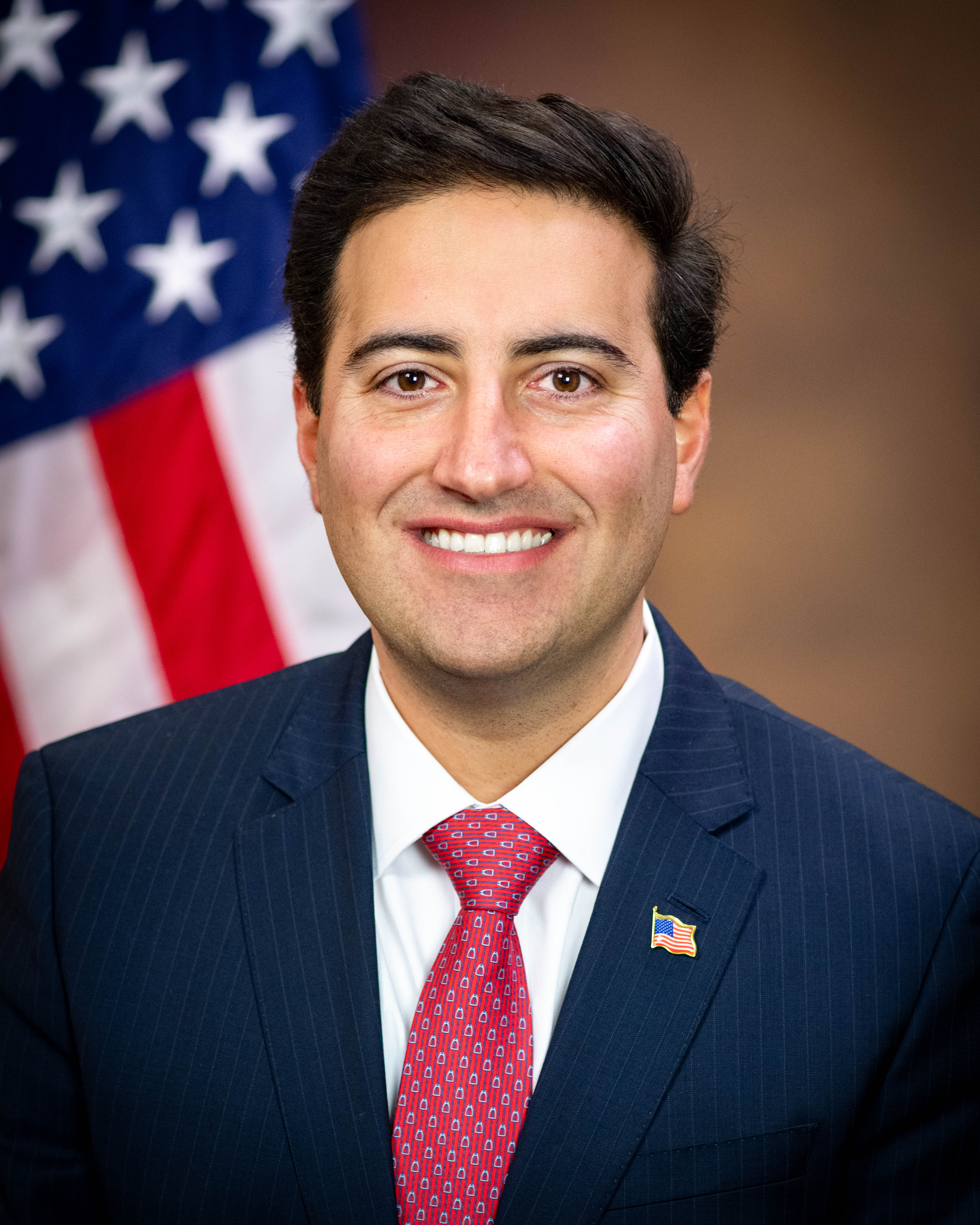
Official portrait, 2026.

Omeed A. Assefi was the acting assistant attorney general for the U.S. Department of Justice's Antitrust Division. He previously served as Deputy Assistant Attorney General with a focus on criminal enforcement.
