= Brock Pierce =

American entrepreneur and child actor (born 1980)

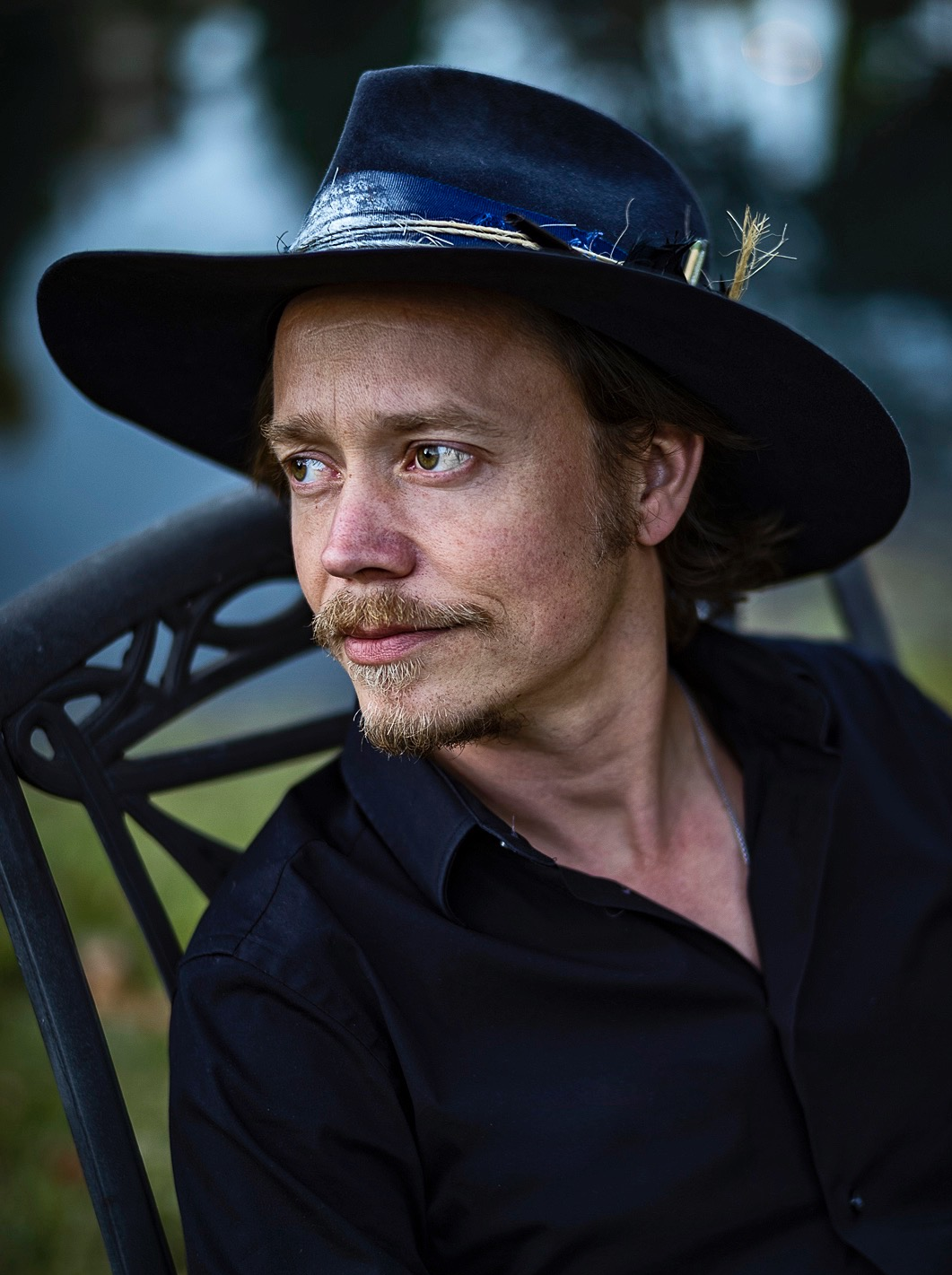
- Pierce in 2018
- Born: Brock Jeffrey Pierce; November 14, 1980 (age 45); Minneapolis, Minnesota, U.S.
- Occupations: Entrepreneur; Former child actor
- Years active: Acting: 1992–1997; Business: 1999–present
- Known for: The Mighty Ducks, D2: The Mighty Ducks, First Kid
- Political party: Independent
- Spouse: Crystal Rose
- Website: Official website

Brock Jeffrey Pierce (born November 14, 1980) is an American entrepreneur in the cryptocurrency industry who co-founded Tether. As a child actor, he starred in the Disney films The Mighty Ducks (1992), D2: The Mighty Ducks (1994), and First Kid (1996).

Following acting, Pierce was involved in online gaming platforms, including Digital Entertainment Network and Internet Gaming Entertainment. He moved on to cryptocurrency around 2010 and was the founder of Crypto Currency Partners, which would later become Blockchain Capital. In this role, he assisted Jeffrey Epstein in becoming an early investor in Coinbase. Pierce ran as an independent candidate in the 2020 United States presidential election.

== Career ==
=== Acting ===
Pierce was born in Minnesota and appeared in commercials as a toddler. His first major role was playing a young Gordon Bombay in The Mighty Ducks (1992). Pierce reprised the role in D2: The Mighty Ducks. He starred as Luke Davenport in First Kid (1996). Pierce had small roles in Little Big League (1994), Ripper Man (1995), Problem Child 3: Junior in Love (1995), Three Wishes (1995), Earth Minus Zero (1996), and The Ride (1997).

=== Digital Entertainment Network ===
Pierce retired from acting at 16 and joined as a minor partner with Marc Collins-Rector and Chad Schackley in establishing Digital Entertainment Network (DEN), which raised $88 million in venture capital. DEN's goal was to deliver original episodic video content over the Internet aimed at niche audiences. DEN was among dot-com startups that focused on the creation and delivery of original video content online in the late 1990s before the wide adoption of broadband internet access. Pierce produced its first show, a pilot for gay teenagers called Chad's World. As an 18-year-old, Pierce was making $250,000 a year and held 1% of the company's shares.

DEN was slated for a US$75 million IPO in October 1999, but the IPO was withdrawn in the wake of allegations of sexual assault against Collins-Rector. All three executives subsequently resigned. Layoffs followed in February 2000. While a new executive team led by former Capitol Records President Gary Gersh and former Microsoft executive Greg Carpenter attempted to relaunch in May 2000, DEN filed for bankruptcy and shut down in June 2000.

=== Internet Gaming Entertainment ===
In 2001, Pierce founded Internet Gaming Entertainment (IGE), a company that pioneered the MMORPG currency-selling services industry. Between 2004 and 2005, IGE spent more than $25 million buying out seven smaller competitors, including four auction platforms and many fan and content sites. In 2005, Pierce estimated that IGE accounted for about 50% of this online market in the U.S., which has about $500 million in annual volume.

Pierce brought in Steve Bannon, formerly of Goldman Sachs and Breitbart News, to seek venture capital, and a deal was made in February 2006 yielding $60 million, of which Pierce took away $20 million for a minority stake. The next year, the company faced a class-action lawsuit. With no assets, the company failed, and Pierce was forced out.

Pierce founded ZAM, a network of websites oriented around massively multiplayer online role-playing games (MMORPG), such as World of Warcraft, Star Wars: The Old Republic, Rift, EverQuest, etc., in 2003. The ZAM.com network included gaming websites such as ZAM.com, Wowhead, Thottbot, Torhead, and D3DB. In March 2012, Chinese internet and tech giant Tencent, acquired ZAM.

=== Titan Gaming/Playsino ===
In 2010, Titan Gaming recruited Pierce to sit on its board along with EA Executive Keith McCurdy. Pierce joined other Southern California angel investors, including MP3.com's Michael Robertson, SOA Software's Eric Pulier and William Quigley, and Jim Armstrong of Clearstone Ventures. Also that year, Titan Gaming purchased the online gaming network Xfire from Viacom. In October 2011, after Xfire received over $4 million in fresh funding from Intel Capital, Titan Gaming and Xfire cut ties and began operating independently. In late April 2012, Titan Gaming announced that it would be rebranded as Playsino, with Pierce as the new CEO and $1.5 million of new funding.

=== Bitcoin and cryptocurrency ===
In the early 2010s, Pierce assisted Jeffrey Epstein to invest in various companies in the cryptocurrency space including Coinbase. Pierce sought funds which he would then channel the investment through his involvement in Crypto Currency Partners which would later become Blockchain Capital. Their decades-long involvement was made public in 2026 with the release of the Epstein files.

In 2013, Pierce joined brothers Bart and Bradford Stephens in founding venture capital firm Blockchain Capital (BCC), which was reported to have raised $85 million in two venture funds by October 2017. Blockchain Capital raised a third fund using digital security offering on the blockchain, one of the first traded security tokens.

Pierce worked with Mastercoin, a startup that raised capital via an initial coin offering (ICO) in 2013. According to Bloomberg, this "kicked off a worldwide ICO craze, with hundreds of startups raising billions of dollars".

In March 2014, Pierce and a group of investors filed an offer to purchase the assets of Mt Gox using a Cypriot entity called Sunlot Holdings Ltd. The month before, Mt Gox had shut down operations and filed for bankruptcy in Tokyo after announcing that it had lost 850,000 Bitcoin.

Pierce was elected Director of the Bitcoin Foundation in May 2014. Several members of the Bitcoin Foundation resigned over concerns about the directors. The organization announced its insolvency in July 2015.

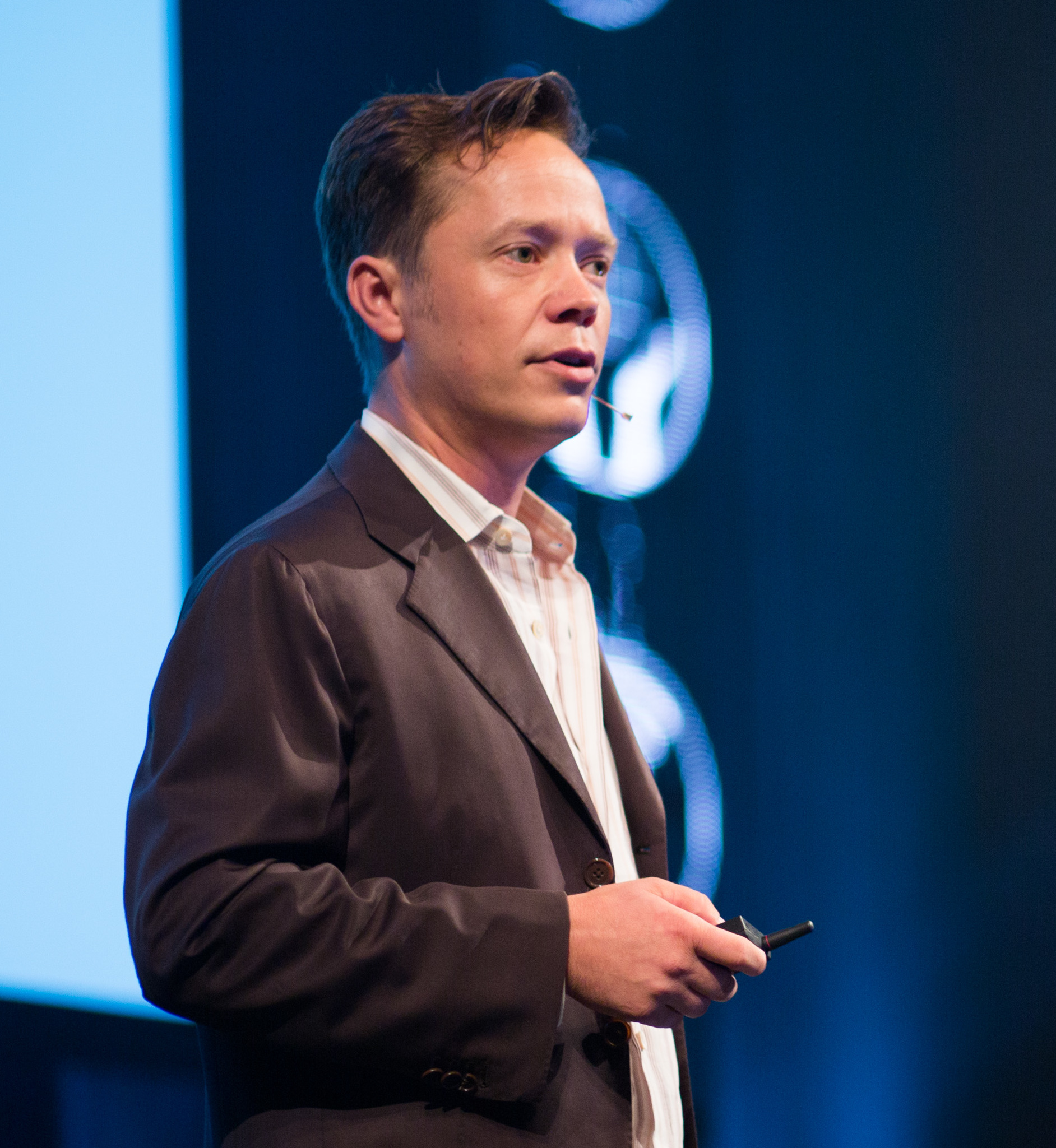
Pierce speaking at the SingularityU summit in 2016

In a February 2018 issue of Forbes magazine, Pierce was named in the "top 20 wealthiest people in crypto" with an estimated net worth between $700 million and $1.1 billion.

Pierce was a co-founder of the cryptocurrency Tether with Reeve Collins and Craig Sellars in 2014. Tether surpassed Bitcoin in trading volume with the highest daily and monthly trading volume of any cryptocurrency on the market in 2019. Tether is a so-called stablecoin because it allegedly maintains $1 in reserves for each tether issued. In 2020, a court permitted the Attorney General of New York to pursue a claim that Bitfinex, an affiliated exchange, did not disclose the loss of commingled funds. In an interview in July 2020, Pierce said his involvement in Tether ended in 2015, but described Tether as "one of the most important innovations in currency."

Pierce co-founded Block.one, which released EOS.IO software. The ICO raised more than $4 billion, the largest in history. By March 2018, Pierce's role at Block.one had changed to chief strategy officer and he resigned from the company that month to pursue community building.

Pierce led an international delegation to El Salvador in June 2021, to advise the Salvadorian government on their formal adoption of Bitcoin as their national currency.

=== Real estate ===
In 2018, Pierce converted a former monastery in the Old San Juan, Puerto Rico, into his headquarters.

In 2020, Pierce acquired Dwight Howard's Pierce School Loft in Washington, D.C. Originally built in 1893, the Pierce School Lofts are located in a former schoolhouse named for U.S. President Franklin Pierce.

=== Roundtable Media ===
In June 2021, Pierce co-founded Roundtable Media alongside James Heckman and David Bailey.

== Politics ==
=== 2020 presidential campaign ===
On July 5, 2020, Pierce announced his candidacy for President of the United States in the 2020 election as an independent. The campaign filed registration documents with the FEC on July 7. Pierce based his campaign around his background as an entrepreneur, and his running mate was Karla Ballard, a fellow entrepreneur. Pierce gained ballot access in Oklahoma on July 15, in Arkansas on August 12, Colorado on August 19. and was nominated by the New York Independence Party on August 24. Pierce was endorsed by venture capitalist and Bitcoin advocate Tim Draper. Pierce was also backed up by singer and entrepreneur Akon, who managed his presidential campaign as chief strategist. Pierce received just 0.03% of the votes in the election. On September 14, he announced that he would form a new party and run candidates in 2022. Jesse Ventura, former Minnesota governor, mayor, actor, and professional wrestler, also endorsed Pierce.

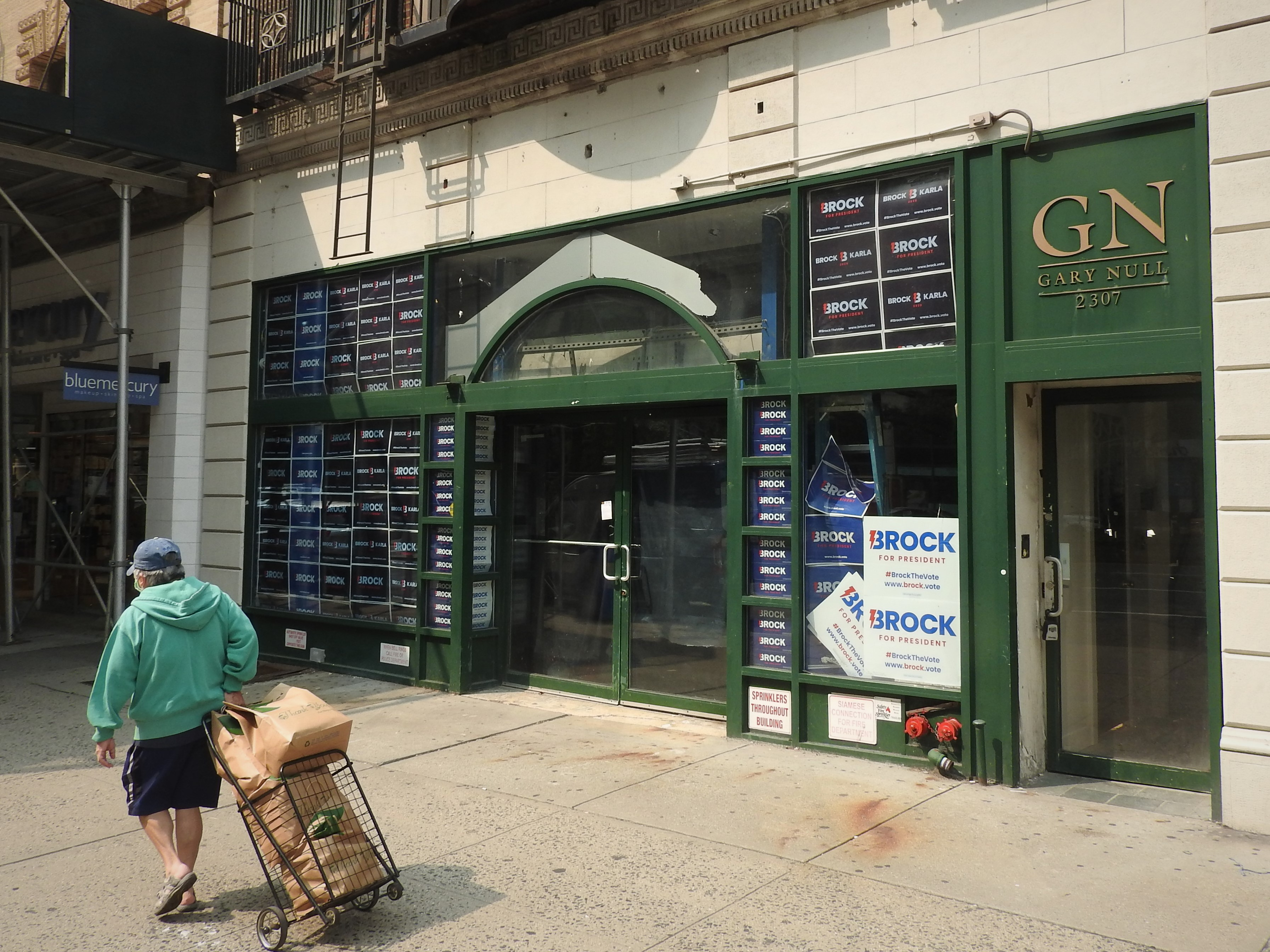
Campaign headquarters, New York City

Pierce proposed "America 2.0", with a government that embraces technology, and believes technology is the biggest issue for the United States' future. Pierce has said that he would institute a universal basic income, which could be enabled by digital currencies. He also supports a single-payer health-care system and the legalization of marijuana. Stating that the war on drugs has failed, he advocates ending federal enforcement and to pardon and expunge all non-violent cannabis crimes. Pierce has criticized the two-party system and has stated that he intends to start a major third party.

The Free & Equal Elections Foundation hosted the Second Open Presidential Debate on October 8, 2020, in Denver, Colorado, with participation limited to candidates on the ballot in at least eight states. Participants in the debate included Pierce alongside Howie Hawkins of the Green Party, Brian Carroll of the American Solidarity Party, Don Blankenship of the Constitution Party; and Gloria La Riva of the Party for Socialism & Liberation.

In Casper, Wyoming, Pierce announced the Independent National Convention, to be held in Cheyenne, Wyoming on October 23–24, 2020. Pierce said the convention would include minor, third-party candidates to share their message. Pierce is the only independent candidate to appear on the Wyoming ballot.

On October 13, 2020, Pierce became the first presidential candidate in U.S. history to receive a vote through an app on a personal mobile phone using blockchain technology, in Utah County using the Voatz app.

He received the endorsement of the Independence Party of New York and the Independent Party of Florida.

=== 2022 Senate campaign ===
In November 2021, Pierce filed a statement of organization with the FEC and later confirmed he was considering a 2022 run for the United States Senate to replace retiring Vermont senator Patrick Leahy. After news reports indicated Pierce could lose his federal income tax-free status as a Puerto Rico resident by running in Vermont, he did not file to qualify for the ballot.

== Involvement in Ukraine projects ==
Ukrainian and Jewish community sources have linked Pierce to post‑war reconstruction and educational projects in Ukraine. In March 2025, Chief Rabbi of Ukraine Moshe Azman and Pierce jointly laid the foundation stone for a planned business school in Anatevka, a refugee village near Kyiv, describing the project as intended to support Ukraine's post‑war economic recovery and to create new opportunities for young entrepreneurs. The Office of the Chief Rabbi of Ukraine has stated that Pierce visited Ukraine at Azman's invitation to see the effects of Russia's invasion and has described him as a “true friend of Ukraine,” while noting that a business school he operates in Washington, D.C., displays a large Ukrainian flag as a symbol of support. In a 2025 social‑media post, Azman similarly wrote that Pierce “has supported Ukraine for a long time” and called the Anatevka business‑school project “an important step towards advancing business education in Ukraine,” framing it as a contribution to the country's recovery.

Pierce has also been associated with privately organized conferences focused on Ukraine's post‑war reconstruction. The Ukraine Reconstruction Summit 2025, held at MGM National Harbor near Washington, D.C., describes itself as a forum for government officials, corporate executives and investors to discuss multi‑billion‑dollar reconstruction and investment projects in Ukraine and the wider region. A 2025 self-published article by Gabriele Pao‑Pei Andreoli, president of the Institute for Advanced Studies and Cooperation, thanks Pierce, alongside summit chairman Alexander Szkaradek, for appointing him as the summit's Strategic Advisor for Europe and the Middle East. Video coverage of the summit by the ALLATRA TV channel shows Pierce, identified on screen as chairman of the Bitcoin Foundation, presenting an award to American pastor Mark Burns for his advocacy of Ukraine during a gala segment of the event.

== Reporting on disclosures in Epstein files ==
In February 2026, an investigation by The Kyiv Independent into newly released U.S. Department of Justice documents on Jeffrey Epstein reported that the files included an email in which a man identified as Pierce, described as a co‑founder of Tether, told Epstein that "a boat in Antigua full of amazing Ukraine's finest" was waiting for him. A separate analysis of the same document release by the crypto news outlet Protos stated that in 2012, after Epstein asked Pierce to "take photos and find me a present" during a trip to "Moscow, Kiev, and Odessa," Pierce emailed Epstein dozens of photographs of a Ukrainian woman named Anastasia and closed the message by writing that "Ukraine is now my favorite country," and that in another email he invited Epstein to join him on "a boat in Antigua… full of Ukraine's finest".

== Personal life ==
He is married to Crystal Rose, CEO of Sensay and co-chairman of the United Council of Rising Nations.

In 2000, three former DEN employees filed a lawsuit against Marc Collins-Rector and Pierce alleging that they provided the plaintiffs with drugs and pressured them for sex when Pierce and one of the plaintiffs were still teenagers. The charges were "ultimately dismissed and/or settled out of court as to Pierce and Shackley."

In 2017, he relocated to Puerto Rico along with other traders, becoming the leader of a group focused on creating a cryptocurrency-based local economy on the island, capitalizing on the aftermath of Hurricane Maria.

In late 2021, Pierce funded a new NYPD Gaming Trucks initiative in New York City.

== Filmography ==
| Year | Title | Role | Notes |
|---|---|---|---|
| 1992 | The Mighty Ducks | Gordon, age 9 | |
| 1994 | D2: The Mighty Ducks | Young Gordon Bombay | |
| 1994 | Little Big League | Sidney | |
| 1995 | Ripper Man | Kevin | |
| 1995 | Problem Child 3: Junior in Love | Duke Phlim | TV movie |
| 1995 | Three Wishes | Scott | |
| 1996 | First Kid | U.S. First Son Luke Davenport | |
| 1996 | Earth Minus Zero | Joey Heller | |
| 1997 | Two Small Voices | Brad | TV movie |
| 1997 | The Ride | Danny O'Neil | |
| 1997 | Legend of the Lost Tomb | John Robie | TV movie |
| 2014 | An Open Secret | Himself | Documentary; archive footage |
| 2015 | Play Money | Himself | Documentary |
| 2020 | Landfall | Himself | Documentary |
