= Close Up with The Hollywood Reporter =

American television series

- Genre: Talk show
- Country of origin: United States
- Original language: English
- No. of seasons: 7
- No. of episodes: 91

Production
- Executive producers: Janice Min; Belloni; Stephen Galloway; Jennifer Laski; Lacey Rose; Paul Haddad; Stephanie Fischette
- Running time: 60 minutes
- Production companies: AMC Networks; Penske Media

Original release
- Network: SundanceTV
- Release: August 2, 2015 – June 24, 2021

Close Up with The Hollywood Reporter is an American entertainment talk show television series co-produced by Penske Media and AMC Networks. It premiered August 8, 2014 on SundanceTV. The show was also exhibited on The Hollywood Reporter Youtube Channel, focusing on Emmy and Oscar nomination season. Since the roundtables of late 2021, The Hollywood Reporter does not make use of the Close Up name anymore, returning to its previous name, The Hollywood Reporter Roundtable.

== Premise ==
The series majority discusses on creatives in the film and television entertainment industry discussing their work and careers in a roundtable setting, it is based on the popular print and digital featurette of The Hollywood Reporter.

== Episodes ==
=== Season 1 (2015–2016) ===
==== Television ====
===== Drama Actresses =====
- Lizzy Caplan (Masters of Sex)
- Viola Davis (How to Get Away With Murder)
- Maggie Gyllenhaal (The Honorable Woman)
- Taraji P. Henson (Empire)
- Jessica Lange (American Horror Story: Freak Show)
- Ruth Wilson (The Affair)

===== Drama Actors =====
- Timothy Hutton (American Crime)
- Bob Odenkirk (Better Call Saul)
- Clive Owen (The Knick)
- David Oyelowo (Nightingale)
- Justin Theroux (The Leftovers)
- Jon Voight (Ray Donovan)

===== Comedy Actresses =====
- Lena Dunham (Girls)
- Ellie Kemper (Unbreakable Kimmy Schmidt)
- Kate McKinnon (Saturday Night Live)
- Gina Rodriguez (Jane the Virgin)
- Tracee Ellis Ross (black•ish)
- Amy Schumer (Inside Amy Schumer)

===== Comedy Actors =====
- Fred Armisen (Portlandia)
- Don Cheadle (House of Lies)
- Will Forte (The Last Man on Earth)
- Ricky Gervais (Derek)
- Thomas Middleditch (Silicon Valley)
- Jordan Peele (Key and Peele)

===== Drama Showrunners =====
- Lee Daniels (Empire)
- Alex Gansa (Homeland)
- Michelle King (The Good Wife)
- Damon Lindelof (The Leftovers)
- Sarah Treem (The Affair)
- Beau Willimon (House of Cards)

===== Comedy Showrunners =====
- Kenya Barris (black•ish)
- Alec Berg (Silicon Valley)
- Robert Carlock (Unbreakable Kimmy Schmidt)
- Jay Duplass (Togetherness)
- Steven Levitan (Modern Family)
- Joey Soloway (Transparent)

===== Reality =====
- Mark Burnett (Survivor, Shark Tank, The Voice)
- Julie Chen Moonves (Big Brother)
- Cat Deeley (So You Think You Can Dance)
- Nigel Lythgoe (So You Think You Can Dance and American Idol)
- Craig Piligian (The Ultimate Fighter)
- Bertram van Munster (The Amazing Race)

==== Film ====
===== Producers =====
- Steve Golin (The Revenant, Spotlight)
- Ice Cube (Straight Outta Compton)
- Scott Cooper (Black Mass)
- Simon Kinberg (The Martian)
- Stacey Sher (The Hateful Eight)
- Christine Vachon (Carol)

===== Writers =====
- Aaron Sorkin (Steve Jobs)
- Amy Schumer (Trainwreck)
- Tom McCarthy (Spotlight)
- Nick Hornby (Brooklyn)
- Emma Donoghue (Room)
- Meg LeFauve (Inside Out)

===== Directors =====
- Danny Boyle (Steve Jobs)
- Tom Hooper (The Danish Girl)
- Alejandro G. Inarritu (The Revenant)
- David O. Russell (Joy)
- Ridley Scott (The Martian)
- Quentin Tarantino (The Hateful Eight)

===== Actresses =====
- Carey Mulligan (Suffragette)
- Jennifer Lawrence (Joy)
- Cate Blanchett (Carol, Truth)
- Jane Fonda (Youth)
- Brie Larson (Room)
- Helen Mirren (Trumbo, Woman in Gold)
- Charlotte Rampling (45 Years)
- Kate Winslet (Steve Jobs)

===== Actor =====
- Michael Caine (Youth)
- Will Smith (Concussion)
- Benicio Del Toro (Sicario)
- Joel Edgerton (Black Mass)
- Samuel L. Jackson (The Hateful Eight)
- Mark Ruffalo (Spotlight)

===== Documentary =====
- Alex Gibney (Going Clear: Scientology and the Prison of Belief, Steve Jobs: The Man in the Machine)
- Michael Moore (Where to Invade Next)
- Amy Berg (Janis: Little Girl Blue, Prophet's Prey)
- Kirby Dick (The Hunting Ground)
- Liz Garbus (What Happened, Miss Simone?)
- Elizabeth Chai Vasarhelyi (Meru)

===== Cinematographers =====
- Robert Richardson (The Hateful Eight)
- Danny Cohen (The Danish Girl, Room)
- Masanobu Takayanagi (Black Mass, Spotlight)
- Mandy Walker (Truth)
- Alwin Kuchler (Steve Jobs)
- Linus Sandgren (Joy)

=== Season 2 (2016–2017) ===
==== Television ====
===== Drama Actresses =====
- Kirsten Dunst (Fargo)
- Regina King (American Crime and The Leftovers)
- Jennifer Lopez (Shades of Blue)
- Julianna Margulies (The Good Wife)
- Sarah Paulson (American Horror Story: Hotel and The People v. O.J. Simpson)
- Kerry Washington (Confirmation and Scandal)
- Constance Zimmer (UnREAL)

===== Drama Actors =====
- Bobby Cannavale (Vinyl)
- Paul Giamatti (Billions)
- Cuba Gooding Jr. (The People v. O.J. Simpson)
- Rami Malek (Mr. Robot)
- Wagner Moura (Narcos)
- Forest Whitaker (Roots)

===== Comedy Actresses =====
- Rachel Bloom (Crazy Ex-Girlfriend)
- Ilana Glazer (Broad City)
- Allison Janney (Mom)
- Niecy Nash (Getting On)
- Gina Rodriguez (Jane the Virgin)
- Lily Tomlin (Grace and Frankie)

===== Comedy Actors =====
- Anthony Anderson (black•ish)
- Aziz Ansari (Master of None)
- Jerrod Carmichael (The Carmichael Show)
- Tony Hale (Veep)
- Rob Lowe (The Grinder)
- Keegan-Michael Key (Key & Peele)
- Jeffrey Tambor (Transparent)

===== Drama Showrunners =====
- Sam Esmail (Mr. Robot)
- Marti Noxon (UnREAL)
- John Ridley (American Crime)
- Julian Fellowes (Downton Abbey)
- Nina Jacobson (The People v. O.J. Simpson: American Crime Story)
- Melissa Rosenberg (Jessica Jones)

===== Comedy Showrunners =====
- Marta Kauffman (Grace and Frankie)
- Nahnatchka Khan (Fresh Off the Boat)
- Aline Brosh McKenna (Crazy Ex-Girlfriend)
- Alan Yang (Master of None)
- David Mandel (Veep)
- Kenya Barris (black•ish)

===== Reality =====
- LL Cool J (Lip Sync Battle)
- Mike Darnell (500 Questions)
- Mark Cuban (Shark Tank)
- Jane Lynch (Hollywood Game Night)
- Nick Cannon (America's Got Talent)
- Guy Fieri (Diners, Drive-Ins and Dives)

==== Film ====
===== Directors =====
- Damien Chazelle (La La Land)
- Mel Gibson (Hacksaw Ridge)
- Barry Jenkins (Moonlight)
- Mira Nair (Queen of Katwe)
- Oliver Stone (Snowden)
- Denzel Washington (Fences)

===== Actors =====
- Casey Affleck (Manchester by the Sea)
- Mahershala Ali (Moonlight)
- Jeff Bridges (Hell or High Water)
- Andrew Garfield (Hacksaw Ridge and Silence)
- Joseph Gordon-Levitt (Snowden)
- Dev Patel (Lion)

===== Actresses =====
- Amy Adams (Arrival)
- Annette Bening (20th Century Women)
- Naomie Harris (Moonlight)
- Taraji P. Henson (Hidden Figures)
- Isabelle Huppert (Elle)
- Natalie Portman (Jackie)
- Emma Stone (La La Land)

===== Producers =====
- Darren Aronofsky (Jackie)
- Todd Black (Fences)
- Matt Damon (Manchester by the Sea)
- Emma Tillinger Koskoff (Silence)
- Frank Marshall (Sully)
- Marc Platt (La La Land and Billy Lynn's Long Halftime Walk)

===== Writers =====
- Pedro Almodovar (Julieta)
- Tom Ford (Nocturnal Animals)
- Kenneth Lonergan (Manchester by the Sea)
- Noah Oppenheim (Jackie)
- Allison Schroeder (Hidden Figures)
- Taylor Sheridan (Hell or High Water)

===== Documentary =====
- Ezra Edelman (O.J.: Made in America)
- Werner Herzog (Into the Inferno)
- Kirsten Johnson (Cameraperson)
- Josh Kriegman (Weiner)
- Raoul Peck (I Am Not Your Negro)
- Roger Ross Williams (Life Animated)

===== Songwriters =====
- Tori Amos ("Flicker" from Audrie & Daisy)
- Alicia Keys ("Back to Life" from Queen of Katwe)
- John Legend ("Start a Fire" from La La Land)
- Sting ("The Empty Chair" from Jim: The James Foley Story)
- Justin Timberlake ("Can't Stop the Feeling!" from Trolls)
- Pharrell Williams ("Runnin'" from Hidden Figures)

=== Season 3 (2017–2018) ===
==== Television ====
===== Comedy Actors =====
- Anthony Anderson (black•ish)
- William H. Macy (Shameless)
- Kumail Nanjiani (Silicon Valley)
- Ted Danson (The Good Place)
- Brian Tyree Henry (Atlanta)
- Kevin Bacon (I Love Dick)

===== Comedy Actresses =====
- Emmy Rossum (Shameless)
- Issa Rae (Insecure)
- Minnie Driver (Speechless)
- Pamela Adlon (Better Things)
- Kathryn Hahn (I Love Dick)
- America Ferrera (Superstore)

===== Drama Actors =====
- Billy Bob Thornton (Goliath)
- Riz Ahmed (The Night Of)
- Ewan McGregor (Fargo)
- Sterling K. Brown (This Is Us)
- John Lithgow (The Crown)
- Jeffrey Wright (Westworld)

===== Drama Actresses =====
- Nicole Kidman (Big Little Lies)
- Jessica Lange (Feud: Bette and Joan)
- Elisabeth Moss (The Handmaid's Tale)
- Chrissy Metz (This Is Us)
- Oprah Winfrey (The Immortal Life of Henrietta Lacks)
- Reese Witherspoon (Big Little Lies)

===== Comedy Showrunners =====
- Judd Apatow (Love, Crashing and Girls)
- Gloria Calderon Kellet (One Day at a Time)
- Scott Silveri (Speechless)
- David Mandel (Veep)
- Kenya Barris (black•ish)
- Phoebe Waller-Bridge (Fleabag)

===== Drama Showrunners =====
- Ava DuVernay (Queen Sugar)
- Noah Hawley (Fargo and Legion)
- Lisa Joy (Westworld)
- David E. Kelley (Big Little Lies)
- Jenji Kohan (Orange is the New Black)
- Ryan Murphy (American Horror Story: Roanoke and Feud: Bette and Joan)

===== Reality =====
- RuPaul Charles (RuPaul's Drag Race)
- Kris Jenner (Keeping Up with the Kardashians)
- Leah Remini (Leah Remini: Scientology and the Aftermath)
- SallyAnn Salsano (Martha & Snoop's Potluck Dinner Party)
- W. Kamau Bell (United Shades of America)

==== Film ====
===== Directors =====
- Guillermo del Toro (The Shape of Water)
- Greta Gerwig (Lady Bird)
- Patty Jenkins (Wonder Woman)
- Angelina Jolie (First They Killed My Father)
- Joe Wright (Darkest Hour)
- Denis Villeneuve (Blade Runner 2049)

===== Actors =====
- John Boyega (Detroit)
- Willem Dafoe (The Florida Project)
- James Franco (The Disaster Artist)
- Tom Hanks (The Post)
- Gary Oldman (Darkest Hour)
- Sam Rockwell (Three Billboards Outside Ebbing, Missouri)

===== Actresses =====
- Mary J. Blige (Mudbound)
- Jessica Chastain (Molly's Game)
- Allison Janney (I, Tonya)
- Jennifer Lawrence (mother!)
- Saoirse Ronan (Lady Bird)
- Emma Stone (Battle of the Sexes)

===== Producers =====
- Judd Apatow (The Big Sick)
- Jason Blum (Get Out)
- Eric Fellner (Baby Driver, Darkest Hour and Victoria & Abdul)
- Amy Pascal (Molly's Game, Spider-Man: Homecoming and The Post)
- Seth Rogen (The Disaster Artist)
- Ridley Scott (All the Money in the World, Blade Runner 2049 and Murder on the Orient Express)

===== Writers =====
- Fatih Akin (In the Fade)
- Darren Aronofsky (mother!)
- Anthony McCarten (Darkest Hour)
- Emily V. Gordon (The Big Sick)
- Jordan Peele (Get Out)
- Aaron Sorkin (Molly's Game)

===== Cinematographer =====
- Roger Deakins (Blade Runner 2049)
- Robert Elswit (Roman J. Israel, Esq. and Suburbicon)
- Janusz Kamiński (The Post)
- Rachel Morrison (Mudbound)
- Hoyte van Hoytema (Dunkirk)
- Dan Laustsen (The Shape of Water)

===== Actors Live =====
- Bryan Cranston (Last Flag Flying)
- Armie Hammer (Call Me By Your Name)
- Diane Kruger (In the Fade)
- Robert Pattinson (Good Time)
- Margot Robbie (I, Tonya)
- Octavia Spencer (The Shape of Water)

=== Season 4 (2018–2019) ===
==== Television ====
===== Comedy Actors =====
- Louie Anderson (Baskets)
- Sean Hayes (Will & Grace)
- Marc Maron (GLOW)
- Tracy Morgan (The Last O.G.)
- Ray Romano (Get Shorty)
- Tony Shalhoub (The Marvelous Mrs. Maisel)

===== Comedy Actresses =====
- Drew Barrymore (Santa Clarita Diet)
- Alison Brie (GLOW)
- Rachel Brosnahan (The Marvelous Mrs. Maisel)
- Debra Messing (Will & Grace)
- Tracee Ellis Ross (black•ish)
- Molly Shannon (Divorce)
- Frankie Shaw (SMILF)

===== Drama Actors =====
- Jason Bateman (Ozark)
- Darren Criss (The Assassination of Gianni Versace)
- Jeff Daniels (Godless and The Looming Tower)
- Michael B. Jordan (Fahrenheit 451)
- Matthew Rhys (The Americans)
- J.K. Simmons (Counterpoint)

===== Drama Actresses =====
- Angela Bassett (9-1-1)
- Claire Foy (The Crown)
- Maggie Gyllenhaal (The Deuce)
- Elisabeth Moss (The Handmaid's Tale and Top of the Lake: China Girl)
- Thandie Newton (Westworld)
- Sandra Oh (Killing Eve)

===== Genre Showrunners =====
- Salim Akil (Black Lightning)
- Jason Blum (Sharp Objects and The Purge)
- Simon Kinberg (Legion)
- Robert Kirkman (The Walking Dead)
- Shawn Levy (Stranger Things)
- Jonathan Nolan (Westworld)
- Melissa Rosenberg (Jessica Jones)

===== Comedy Showrunners =====
- Alec Berg (Barry and Silicon Valley)
- Pamela Adlon (Better Things)
- Whitney Cummings (Roseanne)
- Michael Schur (The Good Place)
- Amy Sherman-Palladino (The Marvelous Mrs. Maisel)
- Justin Simien (Dear White People)

===== Drama Showrunners =====
- Dan Futterman (The Looming Tower)
- Courtney Kemp (Power)
- Bruce Miller (The Handmaid's Tale)
- Peter Morgan (The Crown)
- David Shore (The Good Doctor)
- Lena Waithe (The Chi)

==== Film ====
===== Directors =====
- Ryan Coogler (Black Panther)
- Bradley Cooper (A Star Is Born)
- Alfonso Cuaron (Roma)
- Marielle Heller (Can You Ever Forgive Me?)
- Yorgos Lanthimos (The Favourite)
- Spike Lee (BlacKkKlansman)

===== Actors =====
- Mahershala Ali (Green Book)
- Chadwick Boseman (Black Panther)
- Timothee Chalamet (Beautiful Boy)
- Richard E. Grant (Can You Ever Forgive Me?)
- Hugh Jackman (The Front Runner)
- Viggo Mortensen (Green Book)

===== Actresses =====
- Glenn Close (The Wife)
- Lady Gaga (A Star Is Born)
- Kathryn Hahn (Private Life)
- Nicole Kidman (Destroyer and Boy Erased)
- Regina King (If Beale Street Could Talk)
- Rachel Weisz (The Favourite)

===== Producers =====
- Ceci Dempsey (The Favourite)
- Kevin Feige (Black Panther)
- Bill Gerber (A Star Is Born)
- Paul Greengrass (22 July)
- Nina Jacobson (Ben Is Back, Crazy Rich Asians)
- Gabriela Rodriguez (Roma)

===== Writers =====
- Bo Burnham (Eighth Grade)
- Peter Farrelly (Green Book)
- Tamara Jenkins (Private Life)
- John Krasinski (A Quiet Place)
- Eric Roth (A Star Is Born)
- Paul Schrader (First Reformed)

===== Songwriters =====
- Jack Antonoff ("Alfie's Song (Not So Typical Love Song)" from Love, Simon)
- David Crosby ("Home Free" from Little Pink House)
- Kesha ("Here Comes the Change" from On the Basis of Sex)
- Tim McGraw ("Gravity" from Free Solo)
- Boots Riley ("OYAHYTT" Sorry to Bother You)
- Mark Ronson ("Shallow" from A Star is Born)
- Diane Warren ("I'll Fight" from RBG)

===== Documentary =====
- Julie Cohen (RBG)
- Rashida Jones (Quincy)
- Bing Liu (Minding the Gap)
- Morgan Neville (Won't You Be My Neighbor? and They'll Love Me When I'm Dead)
- Chai Vasarhelyi (Free Solo)
- Tim Wardle (Three Identical Strangers)

=== Season 5 (2019–2020) ===
==== Television ====
===== Comedy Actresses =====
- Alex Borstein (The Marvelous Mrs. Maisel)
- Jane Fonda (Grace and Frankie)
- Tiffany Haddish (The Last O.G.)
- Regina Hall (Black Monday)
- Natasha Lyonne (Russian Doll)
- Maya Rudolph (Forever)
- Phoebe Waller-Bridge (Fleabag)

===== Comedy Actor =====
- Sacha Baron Cohen (Who Is America?)
- Jim Carrey (Kidding)
- Don Cheadle (Black Monday)
- Ted Danson (The Good Place)
- Timothy Simons (Veep)
- Henry Winkler (Barry)

===== Drama Actresses =====
- Patricia Arquette (Escape at Dannemora and The Act)
- Christine Baranski (The Good Fight)
- Emilia Clarke (Game of Thrones)
- Danai Gurira (The Walking Dead)
- Niecy Nash (Claws and When They See Us)
- Michelle Williams (Fosse/Verdon)

===== Drama Actor =====
- Hugh Grant (A Very English Scandal)
- Stephan James (Homecoming)
- Diego Luna (Narcos: Mexico)
- Richard Madden (Bodyguard)
- Billy Porter (Pose)
- Sam Rockwell (Fosse/Verdon)

===== Comedy Showrunner =====
- Jerrod Carmichael (Ramy)
- Bill Hader (Barry)
- David Mandel (Veep)
- Ali Rushfield (Shrill)
- Tanya Saracho (Vida)
- Alan Yang (Forever)

===== Directors =====
- Ava DuVernay (When They See Us)
- Patty Jenkins (I Am the Night)
- Adam McKay (Succession)
- David Nutter (Game of Thrones)
- Ben Stiller (Escape at Dannemora)
- Jean-Marc Vallee (Sharp Objects)

===== Drama Showrunner =====
- Steven Canals (Pose)
- Sam Esmail (Homecoming)
- Sera Gamble (You)
- Marti Noxon (Sharp Objects)
- Nic Pizzolatto (True Detective)
- John Singleton (Snowfall)

==== Film ====
===== Directors =====
- Noah Baumbach (Marriage Story)
- Greta Gerwig (Little Women)
- Fernando Meirelles (The Two Popes)
- Todd Phillips (Joker)
- Martin Scorsese (The Irishman)
- Lulu Wang (The Farewell)

===== Actresses =====
- Awkwafina (The Farewell)
- Laura Dern (Little Women and Marriage Story)
- Scarlett Johansson (Jojo Rabbit and Marriage Story)
- Jennifer Lopez (Hustlers)
- Lupita Nyong’o (Us)
- Renee Zellweger (Judy)

===== Actors =====
- Adam Driver (Marriage Storyand The Report)
- Robert de Niro (The Irishman)
- Jamie Foxx (Just Mercy)
- Tom Hanks (A Beautiful Day in the Neighbourhood)
- Shia LaBeouf (Honey Boy)
- Adam Sandler (Uncut Gems)

===== Producers =====
- Peter Chernin (Ford v Ferrari)
- David Heyman (Marriage Story and Once Upon a Time in Hollywood)
- Dan Lin (The Two Popes)
- Debra Martin Chase (Harriet)
- Charlize Theron (Bombshell)
- Emma Tillinger Koskoff (The Irishman and Joker)

===== Writers =====
- Kasi Lemmons (Harriet)
- Anthony McCarten (The Two Popes)
- Destin Daniel Cretton (Just Mercy)
- Charles Randolph (Bombshell)
- Lorene Scafaria (Hustlers)
- Taika Waititi (Jojo Rabbit)

===== Documentary =====
- Alex Gibney (Citizen K)
- Lauren Greenfield (The Kingmaker)
- Asif Kapadia (Diego Maradona)
- Todd Douglas Miller (Apollo 11)
- Julia Reichert (American Factory)
- Nanfu Wang (One Child Nation)

===== Studio Executives =====
- Toby Emmerich (chairman of Warner Bros.)
- Jim Gianopulos (chairman and chief executive officer Paramount Pictures)
- Alan Horn (chief creative officer and co-chairman of Walt Disney Motion Picture Studios)
- Donna Langley (chairwoman of Universal Studios)
- Tom Rothman (executive and chief chairman of Sony Pictures Motion Picture Group)
- Jennifer Salke (head of Amazon Studios)
- Scott Stuber (VP of Original Content, Netflix)

=== Season 6 (2020–2021) ===
==== Television ====
===== Comedy Actresses =====
- Elle Fanning (The Great)
- Tiffany Haddish (Black Mitzvah and The Last O.G.)
- Jameela Jamil (The Good Place)
- Jane Levy (Zoey's Extraordinary Playlist)
- Amy Sedaris (At Home with Amy Sedaris)
- Robin Thede (A Black Lady Sketch Show)

===== Comedy Actor =====
- Ricky Gervais (After Life)
- Dan Levy (Schitt's Creek)
- Kumail Nanjiani (Silicon Valley)
- Kenan Thompson (Saturday Night Live)
- Ramy Youssef (Ramy)

===== Drama Actresses =====
- Jennifer Aniston (The Morning Show)
- Helena Bonham Carter (The Crown)
- Rose Byrne (Mrs. America)
- Janelle Monae (Homecoming)
- Reese Witherspoon (Big Little Lies, Little Fires Everywhere and The Morning Show)
- Zendaya (Euphoria)

===== Drama Actor =====
- Yahya Abdul-Mateen II (Watchmen)
- Kieran Culkin (Succession)
- Daveed Diggs (Snowpiercer)
- Tobias Menzies (The Crown)
- Bob Odenkirk (Better Call Saul)
- Patrick Stewart (Star Trek: Picard)

===== Comedy Showrunner =====
- Kenya Barris (#blackAF)
- Greg Daniels (Space Force)
- Liz Feldman (Dead to Me)
- Rob McElhenney (Mythic Quest: Raven's Banquet)
- Tony McNamara (The Great)
- Amy Sherman-Palladino (The Marvelous Mrs. Maisel)

===== Drama Showrunner =====
- Damon Lindelof (Watchmen)
- Courtney A. Kemp (Power)
- Michelle King (The Good Fight)
- Liz Tigelaar (Little Fires Everywhere)
- Alexander Woo (The Terror: Infamy)

===== Directors =====
- Anna Boden (Mrs. America)
- Deborah Chow (The Mandalorian)
- Jon M. Chu (Good Trouble and Home Before Dark)
- Alex Garland (Devs)
- Janet Mock (Pose)
- Jonathan Nolan (Westworld)

==== Film ====
===== Documentary =====
- Stacey Abrams (All In: The Fight for Democracy)
- Garrett Bradley (Time)
- James LeBrecht (Crip Camp)
- Jesse Moss (Boys State)
- Kerry Washington (The Fight)
- Amy Ziering (On the Record)

===== Animation =====
- Pete Docter (Soul)
- Glen Keane (Over the Moon)
- Tomm Moore (Wolfwalkers)
- Kori Rae (Onward)
- Gitanjali Rao (Bombay Rose)
- Mark Swift (The Croods: A New Age)

===== Directors =====
- Lee Isaac Chung (Minari)
- George Clooney (The Midnight Sky)
- Paul Greengrass (News of the World)
- Regina King (One Night in Miami...)
- Spike Lee (Da 5 Bloods)
- George C. Wolfe (Ma Rainey's Black Bottom)
- Chloe Zhao (Nomadland)

===== Producers =====
- Dede Gardner (Minari)
- Charles D. King (Judas and the Black Messiah)
- Ashley Levinson (Malcolm & Marie and Pieces of a Woman)
- Eric Roth (Mank)
- Marc Platt (The Trial of the Chicago 7)
- Andy Samberg (Palm Springs)

===== Songwriters =====
- Mary J. Blige ("See What You've Done" from Belly of the Beast)
- John Legend ("Never Break" from Giving Voice)
- Janelle Monae ("Turntables" from All In: The Fight for Democracy)
- Leslie Odom, Jr. ("Speak Now" from One Night in Miami...)
- Justin Timberlake ("Just Sing!" from Trolls World Tour)

===== Actresses =====
- Glenn Close (Hillbilly Elegy)
- Andra Day (The United States vs. Billie Holiday)
- Vanessa Kirby (Pieces of a Woman)
- Carey Mulligan (Promising Young Woman)
- Kate Winslet (Ammonite)
- Zendaya (Malcolm & Marie)

===== Writers =====
- Radha Blank (The 40-Year-Old Version)
- Emerald Fennell (Promising Young Woman)
- Sam Levinson (Malcolm & Marie)
- Kemp Powers (One Night in Miami... and Soul)
- Aaron Sorkin (The Trial of the Chicago 7)

===== Actors =====
- Ben Affleck (The Way Back)
- Sacha Baron Cohen (Borat Subsequent Moviefilm and The Trial of the Chicago 7)
- Delroy Lindo (Da 5 Bloods)
- Gary Oldman (Mank)
- John David Washington (Malcolm & Marie and Tenet)
- Steven Yeun (Minari)

=== Season 7 (2021–2022) ===
==== Television ====
===== Drama Actresses =====
- Gillian Anderson (The Crown)
- Cynthia Erivo (Genius: Aretha)
- Elizabeth Olsen (WandaVision)
- MJ Rodriguez (Pose)
- Sarah Paulson (Ratched)
- Anya Taylor-Joy (The Queen's Gambit)

===== Drama Showrunners =====
- Misha Green (Lovecraft Country)
- Katori Hall (P-Valley)
- Ethan Hawke (The Good Lord Bird)
- Barry Jenkins (The Underground Railroad)
- Peter Morgan (The Crown)

===== Directors =====
- Steven Canals (Pose)
- Noah Hawley (Fargo)
- Lena Dunham (Industry)
- Zach Braff (Ted Lasso)
- Lucia Aniello (Hacks)
- Rick Famuyiwa (The Mandalorian)

===== Drama Actors =====
- Regé-Jean Page (Bridgerton)
- John Boyega (Small Axe: Red, White and Blue)
- Josh O'Connor (The Crown)
- Jonathan Majors (Lovecraft Country)
- Chris Rock (Fargo)

===== Comedy Showrunners =====
- Wanda Sykes (The Upshaws)
- Bill Lawrence (Ted Lasso)
- Chuck Lorre (The Kominsky Method, United States of Al)
- Nasim Pedrad (Chad)
- Darren Star (Emily in Paris, Younger)
- Anna Konkle (PEN15)

===== Comedy Actresses =====
- Aidy Bryant (Shrill, Saturday Night Live)
- Kaley Cuoco (The Flight Attendant)
- Lena Waithe (Master of None)
- Jean Smart (Hacks)
- Cristin Milioti (Made for Love)
- Holly Hunter (Mr. Mayor)

===== Comedy Actors =====
- Pete Davidson (Saturday Night Live)
- Lamorne Morris (Woke)
- Ben Platt (The Politician)
- Ted Danson (Mr. Mayor)
- Ed Helms (Rutherford Falls)
- Chris Redd (Kenan and Saturday Night Live)

== Awards ==
Accolades for Close Up with The Hollywood Reporter
Year	Award	Category	Result
2017	44th Daytime Emmy Awards	Daytime Emmy Award for Outstanding Special Class Series	Nominated
2019	46th Daytime Emmy Awards	Daytime Emmy Award for Outstanding Special Class Series	Nominated
2021	48th Daytime Emmy Awards	Daytime Emmy Award for Outstanding Special Class Series	Nominated
