= GamePal =

Online platform

GamePal was an online platform for players of massively multiplayer online (MMO) games to buy, sell and trade digital assets such as in-game currency, items, accounts, and power leveling services. The site was a neutral marketplace that supported player-to-player as well as direct selling for popular MMOs.

== History ==
GamePal emerged in June 2004 as a multi-feature platform for MMORPG players interested in digital asset trading. The buying and selling of in-game assets such as virtual currency is also a practice known as "real money trading" or RMT.

In June 2005, GamePal launched virtual account rental services. This allowed gamers to rent a high-level character and play as long as they like, then return the character for a different one or for a character in another game.

GamePal worked closely with companies such as IGE, expanding their options to virtual account trading allowing the buying, trading and selling of accounts.
