= Dino Storm =

2012 video game

- Developer: Splitscreen Games
- Publisher: Splitscreen Games
- Producer: Alexandre Maia
- Designers: Alexandre Maia, Mark Buchholz, Alexander Walter
- Programmers: Mark Buchholz, Ole Schaper, Alexandre Maia, Lars Campe, Jannik Staub, Joana Grade, Behsaad Ramez, Jan Schwien, Alexander Grunert
- Artists: Alexandre Maia, Jan Sonnwald, Jan Weyers, Friederike Engels, Jochen Geisler
- Platform: Windows
- Release: 2012
- Genre: MMORPG

Dino Storm is a free-to-play, massively multiplayer online game written in Java. Players ride and evolve dinosaurs, explore various game world areas to collect valuables and fight other players for territorial superiority—and ultimately, becoming Sheriff of Dinoville. The game features 3D graphics and runs from a downloadable client.

== Plot ==
The game is set in an alternate Old West where people ride dinosaurs and use laser guns. Players take on the role of lucky prospectors in a Wild West-like gold rush. Arriving in the game's main hub city Dinoville after playing a brief tutorial, players soon face herds of prehistoric creatures as well as thieving gangs in their quest to earn wealth and fame while forming clans and alliances. Eventually players can make their way to the top of the town hall by getting elected Sheriff of Dinoville.

== Gameplay ==
In the game, players take control of their human-like avatars ("rangers") and dinosaurs not as separate entities, but as one. They are tasked with helping the local residents of the game world, which in turn lets them progress in the game by means of evolving their dinosaurs, upgrading their laser guns as well as other equipment, and earning fame points.

Dino Storm is a massively multiplayer online role-playing game where players can interact with other players across the world and participate in large-scale player versus player (PvP) battles. Players can engage in PvP combat even in the early game; the importance of PvP clan fights increases towards the endgame, since fame points can be gathered best by controlling sites such as travel gates and claims which are distributed throughout the game world.

Fame points are most relevant for winning seats in Dinoville's town hall. In order to become Sheriff of Dinoville, players need to make their way through a given hierarchy of offices, competing for the limited seats with other players through their fame points; when two players apply for the same office seat, the one who has collected more fame points by the end of the application period wins the seat and can then proceed to move up further in the hierarchy of office.

Starting off on the outskirts of Dinoville, there are a total of six zone maps for players to explore back to back: Dinoville, Goldfields, Mokon Woods, Green Volcano, Coldclaw Valley and Maujak Mountains.

== Reception ==
Kotaku's Mike Fahey recommended their readers to try out Dino Storm for themselves, stating that game's offering seemed very attractive: "Dinosaurs. Lasers. Free. Those are the four basic food groups, even if there are only three of them."

Beau Hindman of Engadget, noted that the game offered a level of complexity which they found to be "pretty intricate stuff for a game aimed at very young players". Concerns were voiced regarding the process of reporting users for violating chat rules, where the author suggested that the game should add an easy one-click solution instead of making players go through an external website for filing the report. GameStar criticized how long it would take players to acquire the best items in the game without purchasing Gold Coins, the game's premium currency, writing, "that's a pity, because the graphics, beginner-friendliness and upgrade options are quite good."

=== Awards ===
The game won the Best Action Browser MMO 2013 award for both jury and audience votes.
