= Cow level =

Hidden level in the video game Diablo II

- Diablo location
- The player character surrounded by Hell Bovines inside Diablo II's cow level
- First appearance: Diablo II (2000)
- Created by: Blizzard Entertainment
- Genre: Action role-playing game Hack and slash

In-universe information
- Other name: Moo Moo Farm
- Ruled by: Cow King
- Race: Hell Bovines

The secret cow level, or simply the cow level, is a level featured in the action role-playing hack and slash video game series Diablo, developed and published by Blizzard Entertainment. It first appears as postgame content in 2000's Diablo II, where it is officially known as the "Moo Moo Farm". Players may access the level after collecting a special combination of items to conjure a portal leading to the level. The player character is confronted upon arrival by a large horde of armed anthropomorphic cows led by a boss character called the "Cow King".

The cow level originated as a hoax about a secret level perpetrated by players of 1997's Diablo, and has been described as one of the most famous and well-known urban legends related to video gaming by publications. The attention surrounding the hoax influenced developers to acknowledge it as an inside joke by seeding Easter egg references in related games during the late 1990s: the Diablo expansion pack Diablo: Hellfire, and 1998's StarCraft. The level's appearance in Diablo II marked the first instance of the hoax being developed into actual in-game content. Fan appeal for the cow level affected later Blizzard titles, which led to similarly themed levels appearing in Diablo III and World of Warcraft, as well as several imitations and recreations in other video games.

== History ==
The cow level originated as a player rumor about a herd of cattle in the town hub area of Diablo (1997). Clicking on one of the cows numerous times is supposedly capable of summoning a portal to a secret level. Screenshots of the purported level, which were created with Adobe Photoshop to show a red-hued portal and demonic enemies lifted from unused game assets, emerged and circulated online.

The hoax was first acknowledged by the Synergistic Software-developed expansion pack Diablo: Hellfire, as a quest which features a non-player character dressed in a cow suit with cow-themed dialogue. The character was voiced by Jim Edwards, a programmer who worked on Hellfire. According to Edwards, the developers wanted to include a quest that references the hoax in a tongue-in-cheek manner, with the rationale that the inclusion of content that pandered to fan expectations at the time would generate positive feedback and reviews for Hellfire. The quest cannot be accessed through conventional means, as the developers intentionally wrote code which required players to type special keywords into a text file located within the game's directory to access the hidden content.

Though Blizzard included a cheat code in StarCraft (1998) that denied the existence of a cow level, employees were reportedly amused by the hoax, which led to the creation of the cow level in Diablo II as postgame content. To access the level, also known as the "Moo Moo Farm", players must collect two specific magical items and complete the game by slaying its final boss, then travel to the hub area of the game's first act when playing at a difficulty level they have already completed. Combining the aforementioned items using a device known as the Horadric Cube in the area will create a red portal nearby, which grants access to an area populated by a large host of "Hell Bovines", hostile bipedal cattle armed with polearms. The Hell Bovines are led by a boss enemy known as "The Cow King": defeating it will confer special items as quest reward but disables the red portal, which prevents the player from revisiting the area again within that difficulty mode. In retrospect, Diablo III lead designer Jay Wilson liked that the content of Diablo II's cow level came up with a purpose, but felt that it nearly replaced or overshadowed part of the game. He said that its sequel would handle the concept of a secret level with better care.

Blizzard introduced levels with similar themes to the cow level in certain titles released after Diablo II, with Diablo III featuring multiple such levels that often require players to complete a complicated procedure of actions to access. "Whimsyshire", also known as the "Pony Level", does not feature bovine enemies, but continues the surrealistic theme of the original cow level and includes a cameo appearance by the ghost of the Cow King. "Not the Cow Level" was a temporary level released exclusively for PC platforms in May 2015 to celebrate the third anniversary of Diablo III and featured an enemy boss known as the "Cow Queen", who could be encountered after players slay an enemy unit called Herald of the Queen. In March 2016, Blizzard released a bonus level that paid homage to Diablo III artist and environmental designer Kevin Kanai Griffith, who had died in 2014. In "Kanai’s Stomping Grounds", players would battle bovine enemies alongside Chief Elder Kanai, who was modeled after Griffith's "Barbarian" player character.

For the Diablo series' 20th anniversary, Blizzard included versions of the cow level in its other games. World of Warcraft, in 2017, required players to slay a "Treasure Goblin" in order to spawn a portal that grants access to the level. The "Tavern Brawl" mode of digital card game Hearthstone (2014) featured a bonus unlockable encounter with the Cow King via a Secret Level card. In Diablo II: Resurrected (2021), the portal to the cow level can reopen and the level itself is now infinitely playable even after the Cow King is slain.

In May 2023, Blizzard general manager Rod Fergusson publicly denied the existence of the cow level and stated that the developers were working to keep Diablo IV "as grounded as possible". Players nonetheless hinted at supposed clues found in the game after its June release, such as a mention of the "Oxen Gods" and a cow-shaped map. Several months later, a player stated that they had killed 666 cows and was subsequently awarded one of several relics that could unlock a location called the "Forlorn Hovel", which housed a secret portal leading to the cow level. Speculation about the level was renewed in September 2024 after an update of Diablo IV, when Wowhead compiled a database of objects from Diablo III such as the "Bovine Bardiche" that was described by Blizzard as a "badly damaged and decayed weapon [that] reeks of manure".

== Impact and legacy ==
The cow level is cited as an influential factor for the Diablo series, with multiple sources drawing attention to its notoriety and origins as one of the most notable hoaxes or in-jokes in video game history. References to the cow level or its associated elements have appeared in every Blizzard game since the late 1990s. Developers involved with the Diablo series would maintain, in a mock serious manner, that there is no cow level when directly questioned about the subject. Will Fulton compared the prevalence of “There is no cow level” within the video game community to “the cake is a lie”. Gamingbolt described the notoriety surrounding the cow level to be "so big and self sustaining that it became a self realizing meme".

The cow level continues to receive positive reception from critics and the video game community, and appears in multiple "top" lists of easter eggs, bonus levels or side quests by publications such as Complex, IGN, and GamesRadar+. In a discussion about the phenomenon of gigantism in Holstein Friesian cattle, James Gorman of The New York Times drew an analogy to the secret cow level, which he considered to be highly memorable due to the "weird and disturbing" nature of the player character being surrounded by giant bipedal Friesian cattle. Vice considered the cow level to be one of Blizzard's most outstanding moments throughout its game development history.

The cow level has been subject to Easter egg references or imitations in other games. The PC port of Final Fantasy VII includes a reference which can be encountered by the player if the correct decision is picked during an in-game sequence. The level is referenced in the 2016 video game Watch Dogs 2 by a character to describe the difficulty level and stakes of an infiltration attempt. The cow level has been imitated as a form of tribute in games such as Goat Simulator, Marvel Heroes, and Minecraft Dungeons.

== See also ==
- Ermac, a hoax character from the Mortal Kombat series who later became a playable character
- Sheng Long, a character from the Street Fighter series that originated as an EGM April Fools joke
