= D2R =

D2R may refer to:

- Dopamine receptor D2
- D2R Films
- Diablo II: Resurrected
