= PlayerAuctions =

Digital marketplace

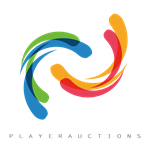
- Type: Privately held company
- Industry: Virtual goods, secondary markets, collectible card games, gaming accessories, cosplay, video games
- Headquarters: Shanghai
- Products: Virtual currency, game accounts, in-game items, PowerLeveling, game coaching, CD keys, game mews / media, game stat tools
- Number of employees: 70 (2009)
- Website: https://www.playerauctions.com

PlayerAuctions is a digital marketplace that connects buyers and sellers of various types of gaming genre such as Massively multiplayer online game (MMO) games, First-person shooters (FPS), Multiplayer online battle arena (MOBA), Mobile game, survival games, battle royale game etc. so they can buy and sell digital assets. These include in-game currency (gold, coins, and cash shop currency), items, skins, accounts, power leveling and boosting services, and CD keys for games and applications. The site is a neutral marketplace that supports player-to-player trading for popular online games such as RuneScape, Old School RuneScape, World of Warcraft, CSGO, PUBG, Path of Exile, League of Legends, Fortnite, Overwatch, GTA V, Warframe, Pokémon Go, Clash of Clans, EverQuest, ArcheAge, Final Fantasy XIV, Apex Legends, The Elder Scrolls Online, Habbo, Fallout 76, and over 250 other games.

Their international office locations: Shanghai

== History ==
PlayerAuctions started in November 1999 as an auction hosting platform for MMORPG players interested in digital asset trading. The buying and selling of in-game assets such as virtual currency is also a practice known as "real money trading" or RMT. On 1 April 2004, the site was purchased by IGE. In July 2007, PlayerAuctions was taken over by Korean digital asset exchange ItemMania. PlayerGuardian technology was introduced by way of a Public Beta in May 2008. The site was then officially relaunched in November 2008.

== Controversy over secondary markets for MMOGs ==
The RMT or secondary market for in-game MMOG assets has been controversial for a number of years, with many publishers forbidding the practice in their end-user license agreements (EULA). However, current research estimates that approximately $1.4 billion (US) dollars of virtual goods are bought and sold by players around the world every year. Pro-RMT advocates argue that the secondary market increases the overall market by keeping "used" goods in circulation and bringing in new players, similar to secondary markets for autos and houses in the real world.
