= Wowhead =

Database for World of Warcraft

- Front page
- Website type: Searchable database
- Available in: English, German, Spanish, French, Russian, Portuguese, Italian
- Owners: ZAM Network LLC (doing business as Fanbyte), Tencent
- Website: www.wowhead.com
- Commercial: Yes
- Registration: Free
- Launched: June 26, 2006; 20 years ago
- Current status: Online

Wowhead is a website that provides a searchable database, internet forum, guides and player character services for the popular massively multiplayer online role-playing game World of Warcraft. It is owned and operated by ZAM Network LLC (doing business as Fanbyte), a subsidiary of the Chinese company Tencent.

== History ==
The site first started out as a talent calculator for the game. It was in beta from April 4 to June 25, 2006, and the database was released on June 26, 2006. Wowhead functions as a user generated database relying upon players of World of Warcraft themselves, although the information is uploaded automatically through a client-side program.

Client software is available for both the Microsoft Windows and Macintosh platforms. Users can manually add comments to database items or discuss the items themselves in a moderated forum. Comments placed on database items are moderated by the community themselves, with members having the option to "down-rank" outdated and unuseful posts to the point where they are purged, and "up-rank" posts of significance so that they are highlighted. The database is automatically cross referenced by the software between items, non-player characters and zones or dungeons.

Wowhead garnered some attention when it was purchased by ZAM Network, a subsidiary of Affinity Media which formerly owned real-money trading firm IGE. Fanbyte also owns other gaming and World of Warcraft information sites such as Thottbot and Allakhazam.

On July 22, 2009, Wowhead announced that it would be offering its members access to premium service for a recurring subscription in order to help support the website. The premium service offers enhanced usage of the website, removes ads, grants a wider range of forum privileges, and allows paying members to skip to the front of the process queue for World of Warcraft player character information requests.

In early 2019, it was announced that a new version of the site would be launched alongside the original, exclusively covering data for World of Warcraft Classic and, later, its Burning Crusade expansion.

In 2021, Wowhead began covering the Diablo franchise with Diablo 2: Resurrected during the Alpha release in July. They briefly covered Diablo Immortal before pausing content creation on that title, and are now covering Diablo 4 as well.

== Lawsuit ==
In 2009, ZAM Network (Wowhead's operating company) sued Curse LLC for copyright infringement. ZAM Network alleged that Curse's competing website, WOWDB.com, stole Wowhead's look and layout purposely to create confusion among customers. A judge dismissed the lawsuit.

== Blocking of international traffic ==
At the beginning of March 2022, Fanbyte blocked seven countries (China, Indonesia, Philippines, Thailand, Turkey, Serbia and India) from accessing their websites, including Wowhead. Community Manager Sas148 released the following statement via the Wowhead Feedback section of their Discord server:

"This decision is ultimately due to legal compliance and liability issues with respect to these countries and their laws/regulations. This action was not based on any specific law or regulation in any one or more of the listed countries. Our decision was due to the legal costs involved with reviewing the laws and regulations of the listed countries, in contrast with the amount of visitors/revenue earned from them. As a result of this analysis, we decided not to pursue a legal review and to mitigate our liability in these countries, we opted to block access entirely. This is an indefinite decision. I and the rest of the Wowhead staff genuinely apologize for the inconvenience this will cause you. It was a tough decision but one that we ultimately had to accept. Note: This has at all to do with Russia/Ukraine or any other political/military engagements around the world."
