= An Open Secret =

2014 documentary film by Amy J. Berg

- Film poster
- Directed by: Amy J. Berg
- Produced by: Gabe Hoffman; Matthew Valentinas
- Starring: Michael Egan III; Evan Henzi; Todd Bridges; Joey Coleman; Mark Ryan; Nicholas Stojanovich
- Release dates: November 14, 2014 (DOC NYC); June 5, 2015
- Country: United States
- Language: English

An Open Secret is a 2014 American documentary film directed by Amy J. Berg exposing child sexual abuse in the film industry in California.

== Production history ==
Berg decided to make the documentary after she was approached by Matthew Valentinas in 2011. Valentinas and Gabe Hoffman wanted to make a film about victims of sexual exploitation. Valentinas said, "We chose Amy because we didn't want it to be exploitative or tabloid. We wanted it to be empowering for the victims." Matthew Valentinas, an entertainment lawyer, came up with the idea when he heard Corey Feldman talking about his sexual abuse as a child actor in a TV interview. Berg's 2006 film Deliver Us from Evil, a documentary on systemic child sexual abuse in the Catholic Church, had been nominated for the Academy Award for Best Documentary Feature.

After the film's premiere at Doc NYC, it was re-edited to remove mention of Michael Egan's 2014 lawsuit against filmmaker Bryan Singer and three other Hollywood figures, after Egan had withdrawn the suit. In October 2015, after beginning a limited theatrical release in the United States, the film was re-edited again, so as to receive a PG-13 rating. The film was originally rated R for graphic language. To acquire the PG-13 rating, the only change made to the film was a censoring of the word "blowjob" in two instances.

== Synopsis ==
The documentary follows the stories of five former child actors who were sexually abused by multiple predators. Much of the film focuses on Marc Collins-Rector, who was convicted of child sexual abuse, and co-owned and operated Digital Entertainment Network, with Brock Pierce also owning a minor share. DEN produced brief online videos during the early days of the Internet, and was noted for wild parties featuring underage boys at Collins-Rector's house.

The film makes multiple references to director Bryan Singer, who was allegedly at some of the DEN parties, but does not detail allegations against him. A lawsuit alleging that Singer sexually abused Michael Egan as an underage boy was withdrawn during the production of the film. As a result, the film only details allegations made by persons willing to appear on camera. The documentary also featured archival footage from sex offender Brian Peck.

Among the people interviewed is Vanity Fair journalist John Connolly, who states that an article on pedophilia in Hollywood was dropped at the last minute by Details magazine.

== Release ==
An Open Secret premiered on November 14, 2014 at Doc NYC. It screened at Cannes Film Festival on May 19, 2015, and began a limited theatrical release in the United States on June 5 of that year. Producers were encouraged about its commercial potential because a pirated version was viewed 900,000 times. However, the film received no television deal or video-on-demand distribution. According to Gabe Hoffman, who financed the film: "We got zero Hollywood offers to distribute the film. Not even one. Literally no offers for any price whatsoever."

In July 2015 the producers of An Open Secret accused Berg of not supporting the film. Producers Gabe Hoffman and Matthew Valentinas filed an arbitration against Berg for allegedly delivering the movie late and incomplete, and failing to promote it. Hoffman's Esponda Productions claimed that Berg failed to get the proper release forms from some of the interviewees and that this error almost caused the film to miss its premiere at Doc NYC. On October 12, 2017, Hoffman and Valentinas released the film for nine days on Vimeo "to commemorate serial predator Harvey Weinstein finally being exposed." It went viral, and free viewing was then extended for a longer period due to the interest shown in the film, with over three million viewings garnered on various social media platforms in the first two weeks.

At the time of its Vimeo release, the producers said they were seeking further distribution of the documentary. It has not been released to home video.

== Reception ==
An Open Secret has an approval rating of 88% on Rotten Tomatoes, based on reviews from 17 critics. On Metacritic, the film has a weighted average score of 66 out of 100 based on reviews from nine critics, indicating "generally favorable" reviews.

The Hollywood Reporter wrote that the film offered a "sober look at accusations that lend themselves to sensationalism."

The Los Angeles Times describes the film as "not the hard-hitting exposé that it aims to be" but as "an unsettling look at pedophilia in Hollywood".

The New York Times wrote that the "topic deserves a tenacious call for answers" and hoped for "further aggressive reporting" which they missed in the movie, when Berg linked Martin Weiss "to a string of other men" but only presenting "a secretly taped conversation and some menacing music".

Flavorwire said that "the film feels less shocking as a cult-of-celebrity document and more just quietly horrifying, as it details the trauma and the abuse of power inflicted on young men with stars in their eyes."

Indiewire described the documentary as "an incisive and utterly unflinching look at a subject too rarely scrutinized."

Actor Elijah Wood praised the film in 2016 as "a powerful documentary".

=== Egan lawsuit ===
In June 2015, The Hollywood Reporter wrote of Egan's lawsuit, "His cases against the four men began to collapse in May 2014, just a month after they were filed, when his prior contradictory statements came to light". Egan's attorneys, Jeff Herman and Mark Gallagher, later settled with Garth Ancier and David Neuman and issued an apology that called the allegations "untrue" and paid a seven-figure settlement to both. Neither Singer nor Gary Goddard received an apology because they didn't file countersuits as Ancier and Neuman had, although "Egan’s cases against all four were framed in virtually identical complaints and centered on the same purported events, timeframes, locations and supposed trip(s) to Hawaii". After Egan's lawsuits were dropped, The Hollywood Reporter wrote that Berg was still "convinced of Egan’s general credibility". In 2019, The Atlantic reported that there "are reasons to believe Egan may have been abused".

The documentary previously named all four men in connection with the 2014 lawsuits, but was edited to remove those references.

== See also ==
- Quiet on Set: The Dark Side of Kids TV - a 2024 limited docuseries exploring the behind-the-scenes world of children's television from the late 1990s to the early 2000s.
