= IGE =

MMORPG services company

Internet Gaming Entertainment
- Industry: Virtual currency
- Founded: 2001
- Founder: Brock Pierce
- Headquarters: Hong Kong
- Website: www.ige.com

IGE (Internet Gaming Entertainment) is a company that trades virtual currency and accounts for MMORPGs. The company sold virtual goods for real money in more than a dozen popular games. Members of the gaming community were often critical of IGE, as its services were against the rules of the games, though not illegal by the laws of the real countries in which the games would operate.

During its peak, it had offices in Los Angeles, Shanghai as well as headquarters and a customer service center in Hong Kong. It was reformed in 2007 by Jonathan Yantis.

== History ==
IGE was founded in 2001 by Brock Pierce, a former child actor, and Alan Debonneville. They met while playing Everquest and decided to form IGE. Pierce was the main investor in the company while Debonneville managed operations. Brock Pierce was also the co-founder of the failed dot-com Digital Entertainment Network (DEN). Media reports claim that Marc Collins-Rector is a silent partner in IGE. IGE initially used an address in the city of Marbella, Spain, where Collins-Rector and Pierce shared a villa until it was raided by Interpol in 2002.

In January 2004, IGE acquired its major competitor, Yantis Enterprises, then run by another secondary market figure, Jonathan Yantis, for $2.4 million and 37% share of the company. Yantis later sold his shares back to IGE in exchange for 22 monthly payments of $1 million due to conflicts and disagreement.

IGE's parent company, RPG Holdings, purchased Allakhazam in November 2005, as announced in May 2006. This purchase followed the acquisition of Thottbot.

In late 2006 and 2007, Debonneville was forced out of the company. Later, Debonneville sued Pierce for various reasons related to an investment made by Goldman Sachs a year earlier, which Debonneville won.

IGE tried to restructure its upper management team by recruiting new executives. The company began to lose revenue due to the frequent deletion of accounts involved in trading. In May 2007, a lawsuit was filed against IGE by Antonio Hernandez for "substantially impairing and diminishing [player's] collective enjoyment of the game." In June 2007, Pierce was replaced as CEO by Steve Bannon, who had been placed on the board following the Goldman Sachs investment.

During the final months of IGE leading to its reformation, the board of directors decided to sell the company to their former partner Jonathan Yantis. IGE's parent company was then renamed Atlas Technology Group Inc, which is owned by Yantis, while Brock went with Affinity Media.

Affinity Media was said to be one of the parent companies of IGE, though the company no longer has any ownership stake. Affinity Media's senior vice president of business development, John Maffei, noted that "we're no longer in that business" Affinity retains control of Allakhazam.com, Thottbot.com and has since purchased Wowhead.com.

In April 2014, IGE announced a formal service agreement with virtual currency provider EpicToon.com, who confirmed they will be handling IGE's virtual currency line of business.

== Revenue ==
Common with in-game currency traders, the vast majority of IGE's revenue comes from trading World of Warcraft gold. Its website traffic, and allegedly its revenues, have been declining since 2006 due to the increased competition from the in-game currency traders based in China and anti-real-money trading measures by Blizzard Entertainment, the publisher of World of Warcraft.

== Reception ==
Some gamers liked IGE's offers of World of Warcraft money that would normally take hours to farm. Other gamers called it cheating. Many gamers responded by posting anti-Chinese vitriol, since people earning the gold were "low-wage Chinese workers". Blizzard Entertainment, the owners of the video game, eventually shut down accounts used by "gold farmers". IGE was also the target of a class action lawsuit by a player who said that IGE's practices were "substantially impairing" people's enjoyment of the game.

== Games ==
=== Current ===
- WildStar
- Elder Scrolls Online
- FIFA 14
- DC Universe Online
- Diablo 3
- Final Fantasy XIV
- Guild Wars 2
- Rift
- RuneScape
- Star Wars: The Old Republic
- TERA
- The Secret World
- World of Warcraft

=== Former ===
- Age of Conan
- Aion Online
- EverQuest II
- Final Fantasy XI
- Lineage 2
- Vanguard: Saga of Heroes

== See also ==
- Virtual goods
- Virtual world
