= Phoenix Rising (American TV series) =

- Directed by: Amy J. Berg
- Music by: Aska Matsumiya
- Country of origin: United States
- Original language: English

Production
- Executive producers: Kirsten Sheridan; Nancy Abraham; Lisa Heller; Regina K. Scully; Geralyn Dreyfous
- Producers: Amy J. Berg; Grace Sin; Lesley Goldman; Katie Doering; Tina Ngyuen
- Cinematography: Jenna Rosher; Curren Sheldon
- Editors: Miranda Yousef; Veronica Pinkham
- Running time: 77 minutes
- Production companies: HBO Documentary Films; Disarming Films; Artemis Rising

Original release
- Network: HBO
- Release: March 15 – March 16, 2022

Phoenix Rising is an American documentary miniseries directed and produced by Amy J. Berg. It follows Evan Rachel Wood as she tells her story of domestic violence and her campaign for justice. It aired on March 15–16, 2022, on HBO.

== Episodes ==
No.	Title	Directed by	Original release date	U.S. viewers (millions)
1	"Don't Fall"	Amy J. Berg	March 15, 2022	N/A
2	"Stand Up"	Amy J. Berg	March 16, 2022	N/A

== Production ==
Evan Rachel Wood reached out to Amy J. Berg, who she had known for years, to document her experience creating The Phoenix Act. The act extends the statute of limitations for domestic violence cases in California. Production began in summer of 2020; as they began filming, Wood named Marilyn Manson her abuser.

== Release ==
Part One of the series had its world premiere at the 2022 Sundance Film Festival on January 23, 2022. It premiered on March 15, 2022, on HBO, while part two premiered on March 16, 2022.

== Response to allegations ==
Brian Warner, known professionally as Marilyn Manson, has denied all allegations of abuse made against him. The film claims that the allegations of domestic violence made against Warner are currently under investigation by the FBI, and shows a letter allegedly written by an FBI agent as evidence. The authenticity of this letter has been disputed, with Warner's legal team claiming Wood and Ashley 'Illma' Gore forged the document. Warner's lawyer claims the named FBI agent has confirmed she did not author the document, and said the department named in the letterhead – the "Federal Violent Crimes Department" – does not exist. Gore has said she registered the letter with the United States Copyright Office.

Warner is suing both Wood and Gore for defamation, as well as intentional infliction of emotional distress, violations of the California Comprehensive Computer Data Access and Fraud Act, and the impersonation of an FBI agent and falsifying federal documents. In the suit, he claims Wood and Gore spent years contacting his former girlfriends and provided "checklists and scripts to prospective accusers". One of Warner's former romantic partners, Greta Aurora, has alleged that Gore – acting on behalf of Wood – attempted to recruit her to their group of accusers on two separate occasions.

Warner additionally alleges Gore hacked into his computers and social media, creating fake email accounts to manufacture evidence he had been distributing "illicit pornography", and communicating with lawyers regarding a criminal investigation in to the abuse allegations. He claims Gore obtained his log-in information – as well as his Social Security number – via his former assistant, Ashley Walters, who is also suing Warner. Aurora contends it was Walters who provided Gore with her contact information. He additionally accused Gore of swatting, claiming it was she who called the FBI pretending to be a "friend" concerned for his well-being; the FBI then contacted the LAPD, who dispatched four officers and a helicopter to his residence to carry out a "welfare check" on February 3, 2021.

Wood refused to comment on the specific allegations of the lawsuit, but said: "I am very confident that I have the truth on my side and that the truth will come out. This is clearly timed before the documentary. … I’m not doing this [film] to clear my name. I'm doing this to protect people. I'm doing this to sound the alarm that there is a dangerous person out there and I don't want anybody getting near him. So people can think whatever they want about me. I have to let the legal process run its course, and I'm steady as a rock."

In May 2023, a judge dismissed the parts of the lawsuit that involved the FBI letter and the allegations that Wood and Gore used a checklist for other women to use to accuse Warner of abuse.

== Critical reception ==
On the review aggregator website Rotten Tomatoes, 97% of 28 critics' reviews are positive, with an average rating of 7.45/10.

Time's reviewer Judy Berman commended the documentary, saying that "Berg subtly yet persuasively makes the case that the real—and disturbingly conspicuous—threat he [Manson] posed was not to Colorado high schoolers he’d never met or even to God-fearing Americans in general, but to young women. And the public chose to ignore it."

Writing for the Salon, reviewer Melanie McFarland cast the film as another useful piece of the puzzle formed by recent documentaries about alleged serial sexual predators, saying "But if Surviving R. Kelly demonstrates how cavalierly Black women are dismissed by the justice system, and W. Kamau Bell's We Need to Talk About Cosby dissects the ways its subject carefully exploited his fatherly image to operate for decades as a serial rapist without suffering any consequences, Phoenix Rising explains why survivors can take years to come forward."

Sheila O'Malley from Roger Ebert gave the film two and half out of four stars, saying that though "Wood's trauma is undeniable", the "leaping around in chronology is unnecessarily confusing, and the Phoenix Act battle—where she testifies before the California legislature, pleading the bill's case to different representatives—is over in about 10 minutes, never to be mentioned again. The truncation of Wood's very interesting years-long advocacy of the Phoenix Act is a baffling choice." She also says: "The illustrations are so hallucinatory they take away from—as opposed to underline—the seriousness of Wood's allegations, and the 'loaded language' has a sameness to it which strips it of some of its power. There's a scene where Wood defaces one of the watercolor portraits Manson did of her, and this too feels added on, heavy-handed, unnecessary."
