= Marc Collins-Rector =

American businessman and convicted sex offender

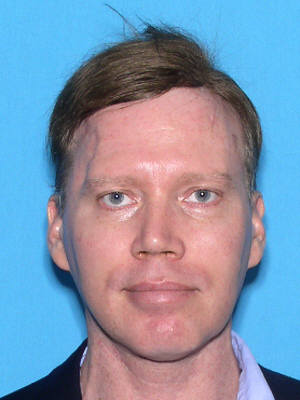
- Collins-Rector's mugshot, taken in 2007
- Born: Mark John Rector; October 16, 1959 (age 67); United States of America
- Other names: Mark Collins; Morgan Von Phoenix
- Occupation: Businessman

Marc John Collins-Rector (né Rector; born October 16, 1959) is an American-born businessman and convicted sex offender, who founded Digital Entertainment Network, an online streaming video broadcaster and dot-com failure. In 2004, he was convicted of child sexual abuse which was highlighted in the 2014 documentary An Open Secret.

== Early life ==
Collins-Rector was born Mark John Rector. He changed his name to Marc Collins-Rector in 1998.

== Business career ==
In the early 1980s, Rector founded Telequest, a Florida-based telecommunications company. In 1984, he founded World TravelNet, a company which electronically coordinated cruises and tours; its affiliate, World ComNet, was floated on the Vancouver Stock Exchange in 1987. Its valuation briefly peaked at $100 million before increasing competition led to bankruptcy. Rector and business partner Chad Shackley founded Concentric Network, an early ISP, in 1991.

=== DEN founding ===
Rector and Shackley sold Concentric in 1995 and, using money raised from the sale, as well as close to $100 million of investor and venture capital, formed an early Internet video media content delivery company, Digital Entertainment Network. Collins-Rector was the co-founder and chairman of DEN, which exhausted its funding following a failed IPO bid and collapsed amidst allegations of Collins-Rector having sexually abused boys, coercing them with drugs and guns.

== Child enticement conviction ==
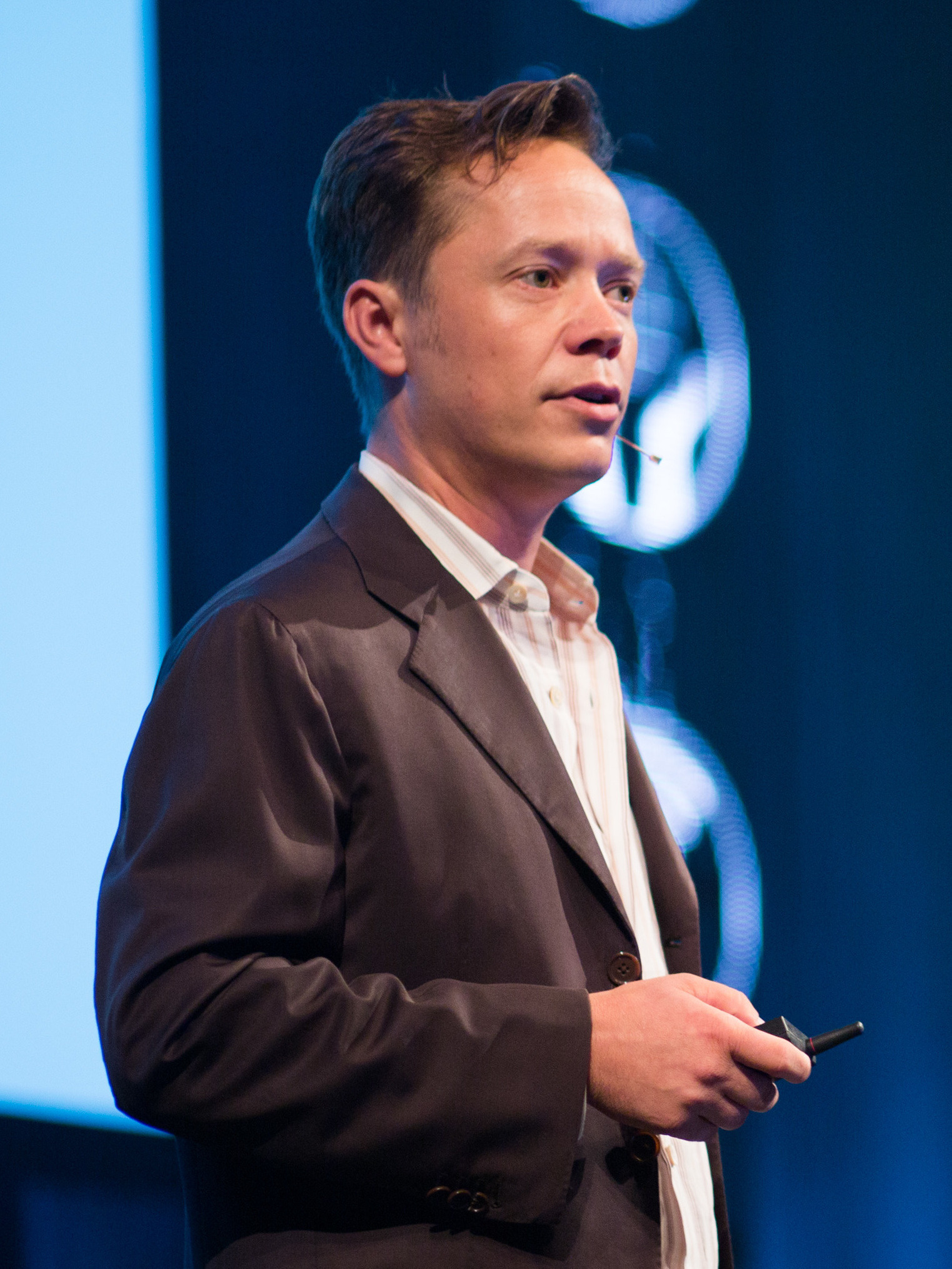
Brock Pierce

Collins-Rector and his business partners, Chad Shackley and Brock Pierce, operated DEN out of a Los Angeles mansion. There, they held parties attended by Hollywood's gay A-list. At those parties, Collins-Rector and others were alleged to have engaged in sexual assaults against teenaged boys.

In August 2000, a New Jersey federal grand jury indicted Collins-Rector on criminal charges that he had transported minors across state lines for the purpose of having sex with them. After his indictment, Collins-Rector fled to Spain together with Shackley and Pierce. Interpol arrested the three men on May 17, 2002, in a house in the Spanish city of Marbella. Shackley and Pierce were released without being criminally charged. Guns, machetes and child pornography were found in the house.

Collins-Rector fought extradition proceedings for two years before returning to the United States, where he pleaded guilty to eight charges of child enticement and registered as a sex offender. He admitted luring five minors across state lines for sexual purposes. He received credit for time that he had served in a Spanish jail and was registered as a sex offender under a weekly supervision.

In 2006, a U.S. District Court granted Collins-Rector special permission to go to the United Kingdom to receive treatment for a brain tumor. He subsequently renounced his US citizenship and has not since returned to the United States. In 2007, he was photographed in London, and in 2008 was living in the Dominican Republic. As of 2014, he lives in Antwerp and uses the names "Mark Collins" and "Morgan Von Phoenix".

== Later career ==
Collins-Rector was a silent partner in the MMORPG service company IGE, which was founded by ex-DEN VP Pierce - who was chairman of the Bitcoin Foundation. IGE initially used an address in the city of Marbella, Spain, where Collins-Rector, Shackley and Pierce shared a villa until it was raided by Interpol in 2002.
