= Amy J. Berg =

American filmmaker

- Occupations: Film director, producer, screenwriter

Amy J. Berg is an American filmmaker. Her 2006 documentary Deliver Us from Evil (2006), about sex abuse cases in the Roman Catholic Church, was nominated for an Academy Award and won Berg the Writers Guild of America Award for Best Documentary Screenplay.

== Life and career ==
Born to a Jewish family, Berg grew up in the San Fernando Valley and lives in the Venice Beach neighborhood of Los Angeles, California.

Prior to Deliver Us from Evil, Berg produced documentary segments for CNN Investigations and the KCBS news program "30 Minutes of Special Assignment". Her work at KCBS earned her Emmy Awards in 2003 and 2004. Before that, Berg researched and developed stories for Silver Creek Entertainment. Many aired on Good Morning America, 20/20, and Extra. In addition, she has written numerous articles for the National Organization for Women, The Jewish Journal and a number of monthly and weekly periodicals in the United States and France.

Berg has directed the 10-minute documentary film Polarized (2007) for Al Gore's Live Earth Pledge. She also produced Bhutto, a documentary feature about assassinated Pakistani Prime Minister Benazir Bhutto that played at Sundance 2010. West of Memphis (2012), produced by Peter Jackson and Damien Echols, documents the story of the West Memphis Three, who were convicted as teenagers of the 1993 murder of three boys in West Memphis, Arkansas. The film has received critical acclaim and won numerous awards at film festivals, including the Sundance Film Festival, where the film premiered in January 2012, and the Toronto International Film Festival. In April 2014, Variety confirmed that Berg had spent the previous two years working on a documentary about child sexual abuse in Hollywood entitled An Open Secret.

In 2014 Content Film boarded Berg's new documentary about Janis Joplin and was looking to introduce the film to buyers at Cannes. The film, Janis: Little Girl Blue, follows Joplin during her performing years at Monterey Pop Festival in 1967, Woodstock Festival in 1969 and Festival Express in 1970, and it also includes interviews with family, friends and rock star contemporaries. On November 24, 2014, Berg and Matthew Cooke launched an Indiegogo campaign to raise funds towards creating American Race, a documentary addressing "the black male crisis" in the US. Prophet's Prey, a documentary directed by Berg which explores the life of Warren Jeffs, premiered at the 2015 Sundance Film Festival. Berg adapted the film from Sam Brower's book Prophet's Prey: My Seven-Year Investigation Into Warren Jeffs and the Fundamentalist Church of Latter-Day Saints.

Berg, along with Glen Zipper, executive produced the 2018 documentary series Dogs for Netflix. She also directed some of the episodes. Berg is the founder of Disarming Films, a film and documentary production company. In 2019, Berg directed a documentary for HBO about Adnan Syed and the killing of Hae Min Lee. Phoenix Rising, about actor Evan Rachel Wood's allegations of abuse against Marilyn Manson, premiered at the 2022 Sundance Film Festival.

In 2025, Berg directed It's Never Over, Jeff Buckley revolving around musician Jeff Buckley, which had its world premiere at the 2025 Sundance Film Festival.

== Filmography ==
- Deliver Us from Evil (2006)
- West of Memphis (2012)
- An Open Secret (2014)
- Every Secret Thing (2014)
- Prophet's Prey (2015)
- Janis: Little Girl Blue (2015)
- The Case Against Adnan Syed (2019)
- Phoenix Rising (2022)
- It's Never Over, Jeff Buckley (2025)
