= Live Earth Pledge =

The Live Earth Pledge (or the Seven Point Pledge) is a petition promulgated by the Live Earth campaign, urging governments to adopt a variety of environmental protection laws.

The pledge was spearheaded by Live Earth founder Al Gore, consists of seven points "directly designed to put pressure on governments and on businesses, but do so by asking people around the world to help to focus that pressure". Among others signing the pledge with Gore in 2007 were U.S. Speaker of the House Nancy Pelosi and U.S. Senate Majority Leader Harry Reid, both Democrats like Gore. The pledge was also presented to Live Earth concert attendees, who will be asked to sign.

== Objectives ==
1. Within the next 2 years, countries have to join an international treaty to cut global warming pollution by 90% in developed countries and by more than half worldwide in a short timespan.
2. The signees will try to live as carbon neutral as possible.
3. A moratorium has to be established on the construction of coal-burning facilities that do not have the capacity to safely trap and store the CO_{2}.
4. The signees will work for a dramatic increase in the energy efficiency of their homes, workplaces, schools, places of worship and means of transportation.
5. Laws and policies have to be created that expand the use of renewable energy sources and reduce dependence on fossil fuels.
6. The signees will plant new trees and help preserve and protect forests.
7. The signees will buy from businesses and support leaders who support their commitment to solving the climate problem.

== See also ==
- Global warming
- Global warming controversy
- Politics of global warming
- Individual and political action on climate change
- Carbon offset
