= Prophet's Prey =

2015 American documentary film

- Official poster
- Directed by: Amy J. Berg
- Written by: Amy J. Berg
- Based on: Prophet's Prey: My Seven-Year Investigation Into Warren Jeffs and the Fundamentalist Church of Latter-Day Saints by Sam Brower
- Produced by: Amy Berg; Sam Brower; Katherine LeBlond
- Narrated by: Nick Cave
- Cinematography: Peter Donahue
- Edited by: Brendan Walsh; Scott Stevenson
- Music by: Nick Cave; Warren Ellis
- Production companies: Showtime Documentary Films; Imagine Entertainment; Disarming Films; Artemis Rising Foundation
- Distributed by: Showtime
- Release dates: January 26, 2015 (Sundance); September 18, 2015 (United States)
- Running time: 101 minutes
- Country: United States
- Language: English
- Box office: $39,437

Prophet's Prey is a 2015 American documentary directed and written by Amy J. Berg. The film follows Warren Jeffs, the president of the Fundamentalist Church of Jesus Christ of Latter-Day Saints, who is now running the religion from the confines of the Texas state prison, serving out a life sentence, for the rape of young girls. The film is an adaptation of the 2011 book of the same name by Sam Brower, who also serves as a producer on the film. Ron Howard serves as an executive producer under his Imagine Entertainment banner.

The film had its world premiere at the Sundance Film Festival on January 26, 2015. It was released in a limited release on September 18, 2015, followed by broadcast on Showtime on October 10, 2015.

== Background ==
Berg was approached by Sam Brower and Jon Krakauer with the idea for the film. Both Brower and Krakauer are heavily featured as witnesses—the film argues they played a major role in Jeffs' capture—and the men take consulting producer and executive producer credits respectively. The two make engaging if contrasting guides through the complex story, with Krakauer coming across as the wisecracking, cerebral counterpoint to Brower's burly man-of-action.

== Release ==
The film had its world premiere at the Sundance Film Festival on January 26, 2015. It also screened at AFI Docs on June 18, 2015. The film was released in a limited release on September 18, 2015, followed by a broadcast on Showtime on October 10, 2015.

== Reception ==
Prophet's Prey received positive reviews from film critics. It holds a 93% approval rating on review aggregator website Rotten Tomatoes, based on 27 reviews, with a weighted average of 7.00/10. The site's critical consensus reads, "Prophet's Prey finds documentarian Amy Berg striking again at evil masquerading as righteousness -- and, as she did with Deliver Us from Evil, hitting her targets with impressive precision." On Metacritic, the film holds a rating of 77 out of 100, based on 15 critics, indicating "generally favorable reviews".

== Awards ==
- Writers Guild of America Award for Best Documentary Screenplay - Nominated

== See also ==
- Sons of Perdition
