= Digital Entertainment Network =

Short-lived multimedia dot-com company

Digital Entertainment Network (DEN)
- DEN logo
- Type: Privately-held
- Industry: Internet
- Founded: 1998
- Founders: Marc Collins-Rector and Chad Shackley
- Defunct: June 2000; 26 years ago
- Headquarters: Santa Monica, California, U.S.
- Key people: Marc Collins-Rector (CEO), Chad Shackley, Brock Pierce, Jim Ritts, David Neuman
- Website: Archived February 29, 2000, at the Wayback Machine

Digital Entertainment Network (often abbreviated as DEN and stylized as > e n™̣) was a multimedia dot-com company founded in the late-1990s by Marc Collins-Rector and his partner, Chad Shackley. Rector and Shackley had sold their Internet service provider, Concentric Network, and used the proceeds of that sale, along with additional investor funding, to launch DEN. In February 1999, Jim Ritts resigned as commissioner of the LPGA to become chairman of DEN.

DEN's goal was to deliver original episodic video content over the Internet aimed at niche audiences. DEN was one of a crop of dot-com startups that focused on the creation and delivery of original video content online in the late 1990s prior to wide adoption of broadband internet access.

In May 1999, DEN announced that their business model had earned them US$26 million in investments from Microsoft, Dell, Chase Capital Partners, and others. In September 1999, Microsoft announced that DEN was one of their partners in the Windows Media Broadband Jumpstart initiative, focusing on the creation of video and audio entertainment for the Windows Media format for high-speed connections. By 1999, the company was reportedly valued at US$58,500,000 and included former Walt Disney Television President David Neuman, Garth Ancier, David Geffen, Gary Goddard, and Bryan Singer as investors.

DEN was slated for a US$75 million IPO in October 1999 but the IPO was withdrawn in the wake of allegations of child rape against Collins-Rector, Shackley, and fellow executive Brock Pierce. All three executives subsequently resigned. Layoffs followed in February 2000. While a new executive team led by former Capitol Records President Gary Gersh and former Microsoft executive Greg Carpenter tried to salvage the company and relaunch in May 2000, DEN filed for bankruptcy and shut down in June 2000.

== Programs ==
DEN produced and distributed a number of programs aimed at specific young male demographics. That included Chad's World, which targeted gay viewers and included Seann William Scott in the cast, Tales from the Eastside, which targeted Latinos, The Chang Gang, which targeted Asians, Redemption High which starred Judge Reinhold and targeted Christians, Frat Ratz, which targeted frat boys, and Fear of a Punk Planet, which targeted punks, included Joe Escalante from The Vandals in the cast, and shared a name with the band's 1990 album.

== Controversies ==
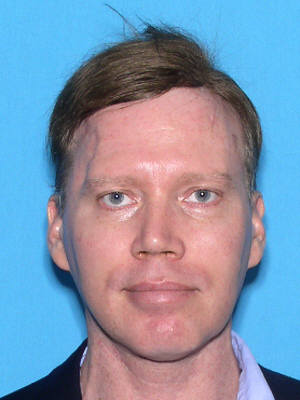
Marc Collins-Rector

DEN became indicative of excess in the era of the dot-com bubble, with high pay for executives while not generating any revenues and very little traffic.

In October 1999, a young man from New Jersey identified only as Jake W. filed a lawsuit alleging that Collins-Rector had sexually molested him for 3 years beginning in 1993 when he was 13 years old. The lawsuit was filed just prior to DEN's scheduled IPO, causing concern among potential investors. and leading to the resignations of Collins-Rector, Shackley, and Pierce, leaving Ritts in charge

In July 2000, Alex Burton, then an 18-year-old DEN actor, Mark Ryan, a second DEN employee, and an unnamed third plaintiff who was 15 years old at the time, filed suit against Collins-Rector, Shackley and Pierce, alleging rape, assault, and death threats. Attorney Jacob Arash Shahbaz, who represented the plaintiffs, indicates that the lawsuit was settled confidentially but the three were reportedly awarded $2,000,030 in a judgment and $1 million in accrued interest in 2011. A renewal of judgment was filed in November 2019 against Collins-Rector and Shackley, citing an additional $4.8 million in accrued interest.

The controversy and turmoil caused by the allegations led DEN to withdraw its IPO and subsequently filed for bankruptcy in August 2000.

In 2014, Michael F. Egan III filed suit, alleging he was sexually assaulted by Goddard, Singer, Neuman, and Ancier at parties hosted by DEN executives but the suits against Neuman and Ancier were dropped. Ancier sued Egan and his attorneys, with the attorneys ultimately apologizing to Ancier and Neuman, saying the allegations were false.

Following the bankruptcy of DEN, the company's trustee alleged possible fraudulent sale of assets prior to its bankruptcy.

== See also ==
- An Open Secret, a movie about the sexual abuse at DEN.
