= Counterpoint (TV program) =

Canadian current affairs television program

- Genre: Current affairs
- Written by: Edgar Sarton
- Country of origin: Canada
- Original language: English
- No. of seasons: 1
- No. of episodes: 19

Production
- Producer: David Bloomberg
- Running time: 30 minutes

Original release
- Network: CBC Television
- Release: 12 February – 18 June 1967

Counterpoint is a Canadian current affairs television program on English-French Canadian relations that aired on CBC Television in 1967.

== Premise ==
This Montreal-produced program highlighted Quebec culture in an effort to encourage harmony between English and French Canadians. For example, a segment showed francophone customers of a British-themed tavern while anglophones ate at a French bistro. Film, jazz and women's hockey in Quebec were also featured. While the program tended to promote culture more than politics, an interview with federal cabinet minister Jean-Luc Pépin was featured in one episode.

Counterpoint was hosted by journalist Armande Saint-Jean and actor-producer Arthur Garmaise.

== Scheduling ==
This half-hour program was broadcast on Sunday afternoons from 12 February to 18 June 1967, initially at 2:30 p.m., and changed to the 2:00 p.m. time slot from 16 April.
