= Blockchain Capital =

American venture capital company

- Type: Private
- Industry: Venture capital
- Founded: 2013; 13 years ago
- Founder: P. Bart Stephens, W. Bradford Stephens
- Headquarters: San Francisco, CA, United States
- Products: Venture capital funds
- Website: blockchain.capital

Blockchain Capital (formerly Crypto Currency Partners) is a venture capital company founded in 2013 by brothers Paul Bart Stephens and William Bradford Stephens.

== History ==
Founded in 2013, Blockchain Capital is a venture capital firm focused on bitcoin and cryptocurrency-related projects. The company invested in OpenSea, Kraken, Ethereum, and Coinbase. In October 2024, Blockchain Capital led a US$15 million Series A funding round for Bluesky Social PBC, a company operating a decentralized microblogging platform.
