= Janis: Little Girl Blue =

2015 film by Amy J. Berg

- Theatrical release poster
- Directed by: Amy J. Berg
- Produced by: Amy J. Berg; Alex Gibney; Jeff Jampol; Katherine LeBlond
- Starring: Janis Joplin
- Narrated by: Cat Power
- Cinematography: Francesco Carrozzini; Jenna Rosher
- Edited by: Mark Harrison; Maya Hawke; Garret Price; Brendan Walsh
- Production companies: Disarming Films; Jigsaw Productions; Sony Music Entertainment; Artemis Rising Foundation; American Masters Pictures
- Distributed by: FilmRise
- Release dates: September 6, 2015 (Venice); November 27, 2015 (US)
- Running time: 103 minutes
- Country: United States
- Language: English
- Budget: $1.5 million
- Box office: $1.6 million

Janis: Little Girl Blue is a 2015 American documentary film directed by Amy J. Berg, about the American singer-songwriter Janis Joplin. It had its world premiere at the 2015 Venice Film Festival on September 5, 2015, and was released theatrically in the United States by FilmRise on November 27, 2015.

== Cast ==
- Cat Power as Narrator
- Janis Joplin (archive footage)
- Peter Albin
- Sam Andrew
- Dick Cavett
- David Dalton
- Clive Davis
- Cass Elliot (archive footage)
- Melissa Etheridge
- Dave Getz
- Jimi Hendrix (archive footage)
- Kris Kristofferson
- John Lennon (archive footage)
- Juliette Lewis
- Country Joe McDonald
- Alecia Moore
- Dave Niehaus
- Yoko Ono (archive footage)
- D. A. Pennebaker
- Otis Redding (archive footage)
- Powell St. John
- Bob Weir

== Release ==
The film had its world premiere at the 2015 Venice Film Festival on September 6, 2015, and was screened in the TIFF Docs section of the 2015 Toronto International Film Festival.

FilmRise released the film theatrically in the United States on November 27, 2015. It was broadcast by PBS on the American Masters series on May 3, 2016.

== Reception ==
The film received positive reviews from critics. The review aggregator website Rotten Tomatoes reports a 94% score, based on 82 reviews, with an average rating of 7.48/10. The website's critical consensus states: "Respectful without veering into hagiography and inquisitive without being intrusive, Janis: Little Girl Blue offers an insightful glimpse into the life of a rock 'n' roll legend." Metacritic reports a 74 out of 100 score, based on 20 critics, indicating "generally favorable" reviews.
