= Thottbot =

Unofficial World of Warcraft website

- Thottbot homepage from 2004–2010
- Website type: Searchable database
- Available in: English
- Owner: Fanbyte
- Creator: Bill "Aftathott" Dyess
- Website: www.thottbot.com
- Commercial: No
- Registration: Free
- Launched: March 31, 2001; 25 years ago
- Current status: Redirects to Wowhead (Classic version)

Thottbot was a website originally launched in 2001 as a news aggregator for various online role-playing games. In August 2004, the site was re-written into a searchable database exclusively for the MMORPG World of Warcraft, as well as a plug-in that could be used in the game itself to gather additional data. The website was discontinued on November 30, 2010 when its parent company, ZAM Network (now Fanbyte), merged it with its similar database website Wowhead.

Since the launch of World of Warcraft Classic, Thottbot is now redirected to the Classic version of Wowhead.

== History ==
The original Thottbot was a news aggregator created by Bill "Aftathott" Dyess, founder of the EverQuest guild "Afterlife", in March 2001. Its purpose was to comb various video game websites for news and information on a number of MMORPGs with a focus on EverQuest, and later grew to include other games such as PlanetSide, Meridian 59, Dark Age of Camelot, and World of Warcraft. In August 2004, Thottbot was re-written to become a searchable database that focused exclusively on World of Warcraft three months prior to the game's retail release. Thottbot would also become affiliated with Cosmos, a popular collection of user-interface modifications.

The associated World of Warcraft plug-in, which is programmed in the Lua programming language, collected information while a person is playing the game. Users could then upload the information to the website's database. The information on the website only came from players using the plug-in and who took the time to upload the data. Information contained on Thottbot included descriptions of items, weapons and armor pieces which web users could browse and search. Users could also create a profile, so others could search and view different players. This required the user to run the plug-in, and since not every player had the plug-in, not every player was represented on the database.

In June 2007, Thottbot's parent company ZAM Network acquired the World of Warcraft website Wowhead for $1 million. Thottbot continued to run alongside Wowhead for over 3 years before it was discontinued on November 30, 2010; the website's URL now redirecting to Wowhead itself. While some pages of Thottbot were still accessible through Wowhead, these were completely removed on November 16, 2016 with all Thottbot URLs forwarding to their equivalent Wowhead pages. With the launch of World of Warcraft Classic in 2019, Thottbot.com now redirects to Wowhead's Classic version with an optional Thottbot visual theme. The Thottbot visual theme is no longer available as of 2025.

== Popularity and reputation ==
Simon Carless of Gamasutra described Thottbot as a "major item listing site". As of March 9, 2008, web traffic company Alexa reported that Thottbot.com was the 250th most visited site on the internet.

During the 2006 Austin Game Conference, World of Warcraft lead designer Rob Pardo spoke of the hardcore market and casual market for World of Warcraft, saying "The people that don't go to ThottBot are the casual players, and they're the ones you need to hold the hand of." A January 2007 article in the Detroit Free Press named the site as a good place to find jewelcrafting designs discovered during the beta test of World of Warcraft: The Burning Crusade.
