= Diablo II: Resurrected =

2021 video game

- Developers: Blizzard Entertainment; Vicarious Visions
- Publisher: Blizzard Entertainment
- Director: Michael Bukowski
- Producer: Chris Lena
- Designer: Robert Gallerani
- Programmer: Matthew Bishop
- Artists: Chris Amaral; Dustin King
- Series: Diablo
- Platforms: Nintendo Switch; PlayStation 4; PlayStation 5; Windows; Xbox One; Xbox Series X/S
- Release: September 23, 2021
- Genres: Action role-playing, hack and slash
- Modes: Single-player, multiplayer

Diablo II: Resurrected is an action role-playing video game co-developed by Blizzard Entertainment and Vicarious Visions and published by Blizzard Entertainment. It is a remaster of Diablo II (2000) and its expansion Lord of Destruction (2001). The game was released for Nintendo Switch, PlayStation 4, PlayStation 5, Windows, Xbox One, and Xbox Series X and Series S on September 23, 2021.

== Gameplay ==
The remaster mainly updated the original game's graphics and network functions and originally did not change any of its item systems or game balance. Resurrected overlays upgraded 3D models atop the original Diablo II's 2D sprites, and is designed to toggle between the legacy and upgraded visuals with a button press. Its cutscenes were also remastered. Resurrected supports 4K graphics resolution and 7.1 Dolby Surround sound.

Blizzard added small convenience upgrades while leaving the core gameplay unchanged. The addition of a Shared Stash lets players transfer items between their own characters, as compared with the original game, which involved a tertiary "mule" character to facilitate the transfer. Players can toggle automatic gold pickup, display ground items and other small upgrades. The game now reminds players to spend skill points and reminds that skill point allocation is permanent. The remaster allows players to import save files from the original Diablo II in local single-player and continue from that point. Unlike the original Diablo II, Resurrected allows the secret cow level, also known as the Moo Moo Farm, to be accessed repeatedly by players. Unlike the original, neither open Battle.net (where player characters are stored locally on the client vs. remotely on the servers) nor local multiplayer over TCP/IP (LAN gaming) are supported.

== Synopsis ==
Diablo II: Resurrected has the same plot as the original game.

== Development ==
Diablo II: Resurrected's development began around 2019, as a joint effort between Blizzard's Diablo team (Team 3) and Vicarious Visions, at the time a subsidiary under Blizzard's corporate sibling Activision. According to Blizzard's president J. Allen Brack, Vicarious Visions was responsible for handling the front-end and 3D client while Blizzard handled the back-end server and Battle.net integration aspects of the remaster. About a month before the February 2021 announcement of the game, Activision announced that Vicarious Visions had been transferred and moved into Blizzard's corporate structure. Brack said this move was due to Vicarious having detailed knowledge of the Diablo series by this point, so that they could continue to provide support for Resurrected, Diablo IV and other Blizzard properties.

During a 2019 media event, Max Schaefer, Erich Schaefer, and David Brevik stated they had been unsure if a remaster of Diablo II was possible due to a near-release loss of much of the game's source code and assets from corruption in their backup system. They were able to recover most of the code and assets through copies that employees of Blizzard North had taken home with them or other means, but the Schaefers felt there were still too many pieces missing to fully remaster the game. However, according to Blizzard's current Diablo lead Rod Fergusson and principal designer Rob Gallerani, the missing data was not as bad as the Schaefers had indicated. Their team scoured through other sources at Blizzard, such as through marketing material, to find additional resources to fill in the gaps. After assessing what was missing Blizzard decided they had enough to proceed with the remaster, with capabilities to recreate any missing assets and redraw the existing assets in higher definition with help of the original artists and animators.

The remaster's design philosophy required the game to be identical to what legacy players remembered. While the developers did not make even minor changes to core gameplay, they upgraded the game's visuals, modeling its remastered graphics on art from the original game. The remaster includes some small usability changes like the Shared Stash and automatic gold pickup. Some new conveniences can be toggled to the user's playstyle preference. The two core principles for the remaster were preserving the authentic, original game's experience and making it accessible for modern play.

The title was announced during the opening ceremony of BlizzCon 2021. Its development had been an open secret, having been leaked during Blizzard's acquisition of developer Vicarious Visions the month prior. A single-player beta period preceded the release. Unlike Warcraft III: Reforged, the prior remaster of Warcraft III which was met with criticisms from journalists and players, Diablo II: Resurrected is a separate release from the existing Diablo II on Battle.net. Brack said that they had learned various lessons from how fans reacted to their Warcraft III: Reforged approach.

Prior to release, Blizzard opened two development tests to players. A single-player alpha ran in April and a multiplayer open beta followed in August, with early access for those who pre-ordered the game on supported platforms. Blizzard made multiple tweaks and additions based on community feedback during the technical alpha, including touch-ups of visual effects, revised item icons, interface usability toggles, and new features such as an in-game clock and extra player item storage. The developers decided to remove ultrawide monitor support, whose larger display resolution interfered with the game's artificial intelligence mechanics. TCP/IP multiplayer support, which let players connect locally in the original game, is unsupported in the remaster for reasons of security. In the original game, players had the freedom to apply whichever patch version they had access to (eg via magazine cover disk) and DRM was controlled via a serial number during installation; Resurrected's DRM model instead requires all installations to authenticate and update on a regular basis, establishing an ongoing dependency on Blizzard servers via the Internet, even for players who exclusively play solo offline sparking concern among preservation advocates regarding the future of DRM on consoles.

Diablo II: Resurrected was released on September 23, 2021, for Nintendo Switch, PlayStation 4, PlayStation 5, Windows, Xbox One, and Xbox Series X platforms. Server problems prevented some from playing the game at launch and in subsequent weeks. Blizzard explained that these problems resulted from several factors. Part of this was due to legacy game code related to game creation and database access, which they were trying to resolve with patches over this period. A second factor came from what they called "modern player behavior" resulting from players aware of well-documented strategies from Diablo II's original release that stressed the servers. Besides working to patch the legacy concerns, Blizzard established game creation rate limiters and added login queues.

With the game released and server problems rectified, the developers turned to focus on post-release player feedback, which showed overwhelming interest in further updates. In a slight break from the remaster's development philosophy of not altering core game mechanics, these post-release changes centered on supplemental, software quality of life, accessibility, and making underpowered options more powerful without affecting the overall game's balance. The development team considered user feedback and consulting original developer notebooks. In response to feedback, Blizzard added a new PC oriented interface bar in December to let players cast skills immediately, similar to how the new controller scheme worked and a modernization of the old two-step method of choosing a skill and left- or right-clicking to cast. Blizzard had been hesitant to provide this option, considered a large deviation from the original. The developer also added a new "public test realm" where players could play-test new features before the main game is updated. Patch 2.4 was released April 2022 and brought the first game balance changes to Diablo II since 2010. Rather than affecting popular systems and items, the patch made some underused playstyles more viable for play in higher difficulty levels, such as a weapon-throwing Barbarian or martial arts-focused Assassin. Similarly, it made previously underpowered options (e.g., item sets and ally artificial intelligence) more effective. This patch also added Ladder Play, a competitive multiplayer feature well-known from the original that was omitted from the remaster's launch.

A new class, the Warlock, was added to Diablo II: Resurrected on February 11, 2026, as part of its DLC pack, Reign of the Warlock, alongside announcement that the Warlock would be added to Diablo IV, as part of Lord of Hatred, and Diablo Immortal. Also with this update, Blizzard made the Windows version of the game available on Steam, along with other quality of life updates across all platforms.

== Reception ==
Reception

Aggregate score
| Aggregator | Score |
|---|---|
| Metacritic | NS: 78/100; PC: 80/100; PS5: 81/100; XSXS: 80/100 |

Review scores
| Publication | Score |
|---|---|
| Game Informer | 8.75/10 |
| GameSpot | 6/10 |
| IGN | 7/10 |
| PC Gamer (US) | 80% |
| PCGamesN | 8/10 |

Diablo II: Resurrected received favorable reviews upon release according to Metacritic, where the PC version has a weighted average of 80 out of 100.

While acknowledging that the gameplay sometimes feels dated, Game Informer said that Diablo II "remains the standard against which all other ARPGs are judged" and it is "still a blast, even today". PC Gamer, which called the game a proud dinosaur, said that its simple gameplay seems revolutionary compared to modern games oriented around micropayments. The reviewer said that the game is targeted toward diehard fans, who will resist any changes, which makes it a less appealing entry point for new players than Diablo IV. IGN wrote that the game is "pretty fun when you get past the clunkiness", but it ignores 20 years of evolution in game design. Although GameSpot's reviewer said Resurrected's fidelity to the original game is sure to please fans, its retro design makes it "challenging to recommend over modern contemporaries".

Game Informer called the new graphics "stunning", and PC Gamer praised the additional detail and changes, such as de-objectifying one of the female characters. GameSpot's review highlighted the graphics as "strikingly gorgeous".

The game sold 5 million copies by April 2022.
