= Virtual economy =

Emergent economy existing in a virtual world

A virtual economy (sometimes called a synthetic economy) is an emergent economic system existing operating within a virtual world, typically involving the exchange of virtual goods and services in the context of an online game, particularly massively multiplayer online games (MMOs). People enter these virtual economies for recreation and entertainment rather than necessity, which means that virtual economies lack the aspects of a real economy that are not considered to be "fun" (for instance, avatars in a virtual economy often do not need to buy food in order to survive, and usually do not have any biological needs at all). Nevertheless, some participants engage in virtual economic activities to generate real-world financial benefits.

Although virtual economies primarily involve in-game currencies and transactions, the term also encompasses the exchange of virtual currencies and goods for real-world money, including through what are sometimes referred to as "open centralised marketplaces".

== Overview ==
Virtual economies are observed in MUDs and massively multiplayer online role-playing games (MMORPGs). The largest virtual economies are found in MMORPGs. Virtual economies also exist in life simulation games which may have taken the most radical steps toward linking a virtual economy with the real world. This can be seen, for example, in Second Life's recognition of intellectual property rights for assets created "in-world" by subscribers, and its laissez-faire policy on the buying and selling of Linden Dollars (the world's official currency) for real money on third party websites. Virtual economies can also exist in browser-based Internet games where "real" money can be spent and user-created shops opened, or as a kind of emergent gameplay.

Virtual property is a label that can refer to any resource that is controlled by the powers-that-be, including virtual objects, avatars, or user accounts. The following characteristics may be found in virtual resources in mimicry of tangible property. Note however that it is possible for virtual resources to lack one or more of these characteristics, and they should be interpreted with reasonable flexibility.

1. Rivalry: Possession of a resource is limited to one person or a small number of persons within the virtual world's game mechanics.
2. Persistence: Virtual resources persist across user sessions. In some cases, the resource exists for public view even when its owner is not logged into the virtual world.
3. Interconnectivity: Resources may affect or be affected by other people and other objects. The value of a resource varies according to a person's ability to use it for creating or experiencing some effect.
4. Secondary markets: Virtual resources may be created, traded, bought, and sold. Real-world assets (typically money) may be at stake.
5. Value added by users: Users may enhance the value of virtual resources by customizing and improving upon the resource.

The existence of these conditions create an economic system with properties similar to those seen in contemporary economies. Therefore, economic theory can often be used to study these virtual worlds.

Within the virtual worlds they inhabit, synthetic economies allow in-game items to be priced according to supply and demand rather than by the developer's estimate of the item's utility. These emergent economies are considered by most players to be an asset of the game, giving an extra dimension of reality to play. In classical synthetic economies, these goods were charged only for in-game currencies. These currencies are often sold for real world profit.

=== Marketplace ===
The release of Blizzard Entertainment's World of Warcraft in 2004 and its subsequent success has propelled both MMORPGs and their secondary markets into mainstream consciousness, and many new marketplaces have opened up during this time. Real money commerce in a virtual market has grown to become a multibillion-dollar industry. In 2001, EverQuest players Brock Pierce and Alan Debonneville founded Internet Gaming Entertainment Ltd (IGE), a company that offered virtual commodities in exchange for real money while providing customer service. IGE had trained staff that would handle financial issues, customer inquiries and technical support to ensure that gamers are satisfied with each real money purchase. It also took advantage of the global reach of synthetic worlds by setting up a shop in Hong Kong where a large number of technically savvy but low wage workers could field orders, load up avatars, retrieve store goods and deliver them wherever necessary. This market has opened a novel type of economy where the border between real and virtual is obscure.

Hundreds of companies are succeeding in this newfound market, with certain virtual items being sold for several million dollars, such as Beeple's Everyday. Some companies sell multiple virtual goods for multiple games, and others sell services for single games. Virtual real estate is earning real-world money; for example, a 43-year-old Wonder Bread deliveryman, John Dugger, purchased virtual real estate for $750, setting him back more than a weeks wages. This virtual property includes nine rooms, three stories, a rooftop patio, a wall of solid stonework in a prime location, nestled at the foot of a quiet coastal hillside. Dugger represents a group of gamers that are not in the market for a real house but instead own a small piece of the virtual real estate in the mythical MMO Ultima Online. Such trading of real money for virtual goods simply represents the development of virtual economies, where people come together, as the real and the synthetic worlds meet within an economic sphere.

Although virtual markets may represent a growth area, it is unclear to what extent they can scale to supporting large numbers of businesses, due to the inherent substitutability of goods on these markets plus the lack of factors such as location to dispense demand. In spite of numerous famed examples of the economic growth of Second Life, an amateur analyst in 2008 estimated the income inequity in Second Life's economy as worse than has ever been recorded in any real economy: a Gini coefficient of 90.2, a Hoover index of 77.8, and a Theil index of 91%. However, the application of these economic measures to a virtual world may be inappropriate where poverty is merely virtual and there is a direct relationship between in-game wealth and time spent playing.

The global secondary market - defined as real money trading between players - turnover was estimated at 880 million dollars in 2005 by the president of the, at the time, market leading company IGE. Before that, in 2004, the American economist Edward Castronova had estimated the turnover at over 100 million dollars based solely on sales figures from the two auction sites eBay and the Korean itemBay. A speculative extrapolation based on these quotes and other industry figures produced a global turnover figure of 2 billion dollars as of 2007.

However, the secondary market is unlikely to have followed the growth of the primary market since 2007 seeing as game companies have become better at monetizing on their games with microtransactions and many popular games such as World of Warcraft are sporting increased measures against player to player real money trading. Also hampering the turnover growth are the extreme price drops that has followed the increased competition from businesses in mainland China targeting the global secondary market. Furthermore, the global decline in consumption that followed the 2008 financial crisis would have affected the secondary market negatively as well. Post 2007 secondary market growth is likely localized to emerging markets such as Russia, eastern Europe, South America, and South East Asia - all of which are relatively inaccessible to international merchants due to payment systems, advertisement channels and language barrier. For example, South Korea is estimated to have the biggest share of the global real money trading market and it has there become an officially acknowledged and taxable part of the economy. In western countries the secondary market remains a black market with little to no social acceptance or official acknowledgement.

As for an actual economic model, secondary market turnover in popular player vs player oriented MMORPGs without trade restrictions such as RuneScape, Eve Online and Ultima Online has been estimated at 1.1 dollar per concurrent player and day. No model for more regulated MMORPGs such as World of Warcraft has been suggested. However, being a largely unregulated market and tax free market, any turnover figure or economic model remain speculative.

== Types of virtual currencies ==
=== Standard currency ===
Many games, both online and off, use a common or standard type of currency that can only be earned in-game and used to spend on in-game items that cannot be traded with other players or converted to real-world funds by means provided by the developer; for example, by completing quests in World of Warcraft, players earn gold pieces that are used to purchase new gear.

=== Premium currency ===
Many online games, particularly those that use the freemium model, offer at least one additional form of currency beyond its standard one, called premium currency. Premium currency cannot typically be earned in-game like common currency but instead by purchasing the premium currency using real-world funds. Premium currency typically is limited to purchase time-limited virtual goods, access to new characters or levels, large quantities of standard in-game currency, temporary boosts to the player-character's experience growth, or other goods that cannot be acquired with the common in-game currency. Once premium currency is purchased, it is rare for players to be able to revert the premium currency, or the goods purchased with it, back into real-world funds without selling it to other players through 3rd-party websites, making it a "one-way currency". Most commonly, premium currency must be purchased through microtransactions in bundles of fixed sizes with discounts for larger purchases, and do not allow players to purchase exactly the amount of premium currency they need for a virtual good. This practice tends to encourage the player to buy additional bundles as to minimize their leftover premium currency, a favorable practice for the publisher.

=== In-game membership items ===
Some membership-based MMORPGs take advantage of the population of players who wish to buy in-game items with real money through in-game items that can only be generated by buying them from the developer, which can then be redeemed for membership status or traded with other players for items such as in-game currency. This also allows for games to maintain larger audiences of high-level players as they have the resources to buy membership with in-game gold from people who purchase and trade these items for gold. This also allows for an official conversion rate of in-game currency to real world currency to be established, though many 3rd-party item sellers will work to obtain the in-game currency needed to buy the membership items and sell them on 3rd-party markets at a lower real-world price than the official conversion rate. Many games who implement this monetization model often strictly prohibit 3rd-party real world trading and ban players who do so. Some examples of this form of monetization include Runescape's bonds and World of Warcraft's WoW Tokens.

=== Cosmetic items ===
Many online multiplayer games have player-run economies of cosmetic items, sometimes involving and encouraging the use of real-world money. Team Fortress 2, a team-based online FPS released by Valve in 2007, is a hero shooter, where players selected from one of several created characters to control. In 2009, Valve introduced hats, virtual goods that could be used to customize the character models. Hats could be earned by players by accumulating in-game material drops and then used to synthesize the hat, or later could be purchased directly using real-world currency through the game's storefront. Valve also expanded this customization beyond hats to include weapons, weapon "skins" which change the appearance of the weapon, and similar means to customize the selected character avatar. In addition, through Valve's digital storefront Steam, players could trade these items, sell them in exchange for monetary credits which could only be used on Steam (from which Valve would take a cut of the sale), or receive them in promotions with other publishers of products they owned. This created a virtual economy around the game, as certain customization items carried status and recognition, giving them a perceived social value status. This created a virtual economy around items in the game, as some rare items, known as "unusuals" by the game community due to various special effects applied, and are seen as having high social value, had traded for as high as US$1,000, and because of the active trading that incorporated real-world money, Valve hired economist Yanis Varoufakis to help manage this.

Valve followed the same pattern with its next major game, Counter-Strike: Global Offensive, where players could earn crates in-game that could be unlocked with keys purchased through real-world funds to obtain weapon skins that were doled out based on a rarity scale, a practice they had started in Team Fortress 2. As with Team Fortress 2 skins, these Counter-Strike skins gained value as status symbols among players coupled with the rarity of certain skins, and became highly valued, and was considered to help boost the popularity of the game. However, as Counter-Strike gained favor as an esport, these skins became part of a larger skin gambling scheme, where grey market websites, integrated with Steam's features, could allow players to use skins to gamble on the results of Counter-Strike esport events, and later just using skins to play games of chance, sometimes skirting many gambling restrictions that virtual and real world casinos are subject to. While some of these websites were taken off line for various reasons, Valve was pressured to prevent abuse of the skin trading systems on Steam.

Many games on Valve's video game marketplace Steam would implement this form of trading in their games, monetizing it by taking a cut of sales revenue from these items, with Valve also doing the same.

=== Player-driven economy ===
Some games may have currency systems that are partially or fully controlled by players of the game. Such games offer the means for players to acquire in-game resources which players may then sell or trade with other players, craft into gear which can be sell or traded, and otherwise create a virtual marketplace within the game above and beyond in-game stores established by the developer. This economy may also mix with real-world currency, with players trading in-game items through external websites to the game. EVE Online is a prime example of an online game with a vast player-driven economy that, in 2014, was estimated to have a total virtual value of US$18 million based on the trading of the in-game currency. Player-driven economies have led to immaterial labor activities, such as gold farming in World of Warcraft, where some players are paid in real-world funds to spend the time to acquire in-game wealth for other players. Websites such as Playerauctions and G2A operate as digital marketplaces for players to exchange items of value.

== Recent developments ==
=== More controlled markets ===
==== Price comparison ====
Information brokerages and other tools that aid in the valuation of virtual items on secondary markets have increased in number. This has occurred as a response to alleviate the labor involved in leveling that requires hours, days or weeks to achieve. Being able to exchange real money for virtual currency provides the player purchasing power for virtual commodities. As such, players are guaranteed opportunities, increased skills and a fine reputation, which is a definite advantage over others.

==== Taxation ====
Most scholars agree that the sale of virtual property for real currency or assets is taxable. However, there are significant legal and practical challenges to the taxation of income from the sale of virtual property. For example, uncertainty regarding the nature and conceptual location of virtual property makes it difficult to collect and apportion tax revenue when a sale occurs across multiple jurisdictions.

In addition to taxing income from transactions involving real currency or assets, there has been considerable discussion involving the taxation of transactions that take place entirely within a virtual economy. Theoretically, virtual world transactions could be treated as a form of barter, thus generating taxable income. However, for policy reasons, many commentators support some form of a "cash out" rule that would prevent in-game transactions from generating tax liabilities. Nevertheless, as one commentator notes, "the easier it is to buy real goods with virtual currency (e.g. order a real life pizza) the more likely the IRS will see exclusively in-world profits as taxable." The IRS had included in-game currency as taxable property in forms for calendar year 2019 reporting, but subsequently removed mention of them after complaints were filed about their inclusion.

==== Gambling regulation ====
As with the above skin gambling concerns, conversion between in-game and real-world currency has led to direct comparisons with other online games of chance as 'virtual winnings'. This is why gamers and companies engaged in this conversion, where it is permitted by a game, may fall under gambling legislation.

During an interview with Virtual World News, Alex Chapman of the British law firm Campbell Hooper stated: "Now we've spoken with the gambling commission, and they've said that MMOGs aren't the reason for the [Gambling Act 2005], but they won't say outright, and we've asked directly, that they won't be covered. You can see how these would be ignored at first, but very soon they could be in trouble. It's a risk, but a very easy risk to avoid." He suggested that compliance might require MMOGs and related traders to obtain a gambling license, which is not excessively difficult in the EU.

When queried about games where real-world transactions for in-game assets are not permitted, but there is an 'unofficial secondary market', Chapman responded: "Ultimately the point is whether the thing that you win has value in money or money's worth. If it does have value, it could be gambling." So to avoid regulation by these laws, the "operator would need to take reasonable steps to ensure that the rewards they give do not have a monetary value[,]" possibly by demonstrating enforcement of their terms of service prohibiting secondary markets.

=== Virtual crime ===
Monetary issues can give a virtual world problems similar to those in the real world. In South Korea, where the number of video game players is massive, some have reported the emergence of gangs and mafia, where powerful players would threaten beginners to give money for their "protection", and actually steal and rob.

Other similar problems arise in other virtual economies. In the game The Sims Online, a 17-year-old boy going by the in-game name "Evangeline" was discovered to have built a cyber-brothel, where customers would pay sim-money for minutes of cybersex. Maxis canceled each of his accounts, but had he deposited his fortune in the Gaming Open Market he would have been able to keep a part of it.

A 2007 virtual heist has led to calls from some community members in Second Life to bring in external regulation of these markets: "In late July, a perpetrator with privileged information cracked a stock exchange's computers, made false deposits, then ran off with what appears to be the equivalent of US$10,000, disappearing into thin air. This heist left investors feeling outraged and vulnerable."

In EVE Online however, theft and scamming other players is perfectly allowed within the game's framework as long as no real world trading is committed. Players are allowed to loot all items from fallen victims in battle, but there is a disincentive in the form of NPC police intervention in higher-security space. Virtual possessions valued in the tens of thousands of USD have been destroyed or plundered through corporate espionage and piracy. This has resulted in widespread retributive warfare and crime between various player corporations.

==== Black market ====
Many MMORPGs such as RuneScape, World of Warcraft, Guild Wars, Warhammer Online, Lord of the Rings Online and Final Fantasy XI strictly prohibit buying gold, items, or any other product linked with the game, with real world cash. RuneScape went as far as making this practice impossible after being threatened by credit card companies when their customers who bought gold had their credit cards stolen to be used for bot accounts to farm even more gold by criminal traders. They did this by removing unbalanced trades and their traditional player vs. player fighting system to prevent players from trading items by killing each other in combat for each other's items (this was scrapped on February 1, 2011, after having been in place for 3 years), resulting in over 60,000 cancelled subscriptions in protest. Final Fantasy XI and Warhammer Online both have entire task forces dedicated to the removal of real money trading from the game. To control real money trading, EVE Online created an official and sanctioned method to convert real world cash to in-game currency; players can use real world money to buy a specific in-game item which can be redeemed for account subscription time or traded on the in-game market for in-game currency.

=== Stability ===
For a persistent world to maintain a stable economy, a balance must be struck between currency sources and sinks. Generally, games possess numerous sources of new currency for players to earn. However, some possess no effective "sinks", or methods of removing currency from circulation. If other factors remain constant, greater currency supply weakens the buying power of a given amount; a process known as inflation. In practice, this results in constantly rising prices for traded commodities. With the proper balance of growth in player base, currency sources, and sinks, a virtual economy could remain stable indefinitely.

As in the real world, actions by players can destabilize the economy. Gold farming creates resources within the game more rapidly than usual, exacerbating inflation. In extreme cases, a cracker may be able to exploit the system and create a large amount of money. This could result in hyperinflation.

In the real world entire institutions are devoted to maintaining desired level of inflation. This difficult task is a serious issue for serious MMORPGs, that often have to cope with mudflation. Episodes of hyperinflation have also been observed.

==== Non-fungible token ====
A non-fungible token (NFT) is a unit of data on a digital ledger called a blockchain, where each NFT can represent a unique digital item, and thus they are not interchangeable. NFTs can represent digital files such as art, audio, videos, items in video games and other forms of creative work. While the digital files themselves are infinitely reproducible, the NFTs representing them are tracked on their underlying blockchains and provide buyers with proof of ownership. Blockchains such as Ethereum, WAXP, Bitcoin Cash and Flow each have their own token standards to define their use of NFTs.

NFTs can also be used to represent in-game assets which are controlled by the user instead of the game developer. NFTs allow assets to be traded on third-party marketplaces where players of games such as Axie Infinity or MyCryptoHero can trade their tokenised "Axies" or "Heroes".

== Capital ==
In these virtual economies, the value of in-game resources is frequently tied to the in-game power they confer upon the owner. This power allows the user, usually, to acquire more rare and valuable items. In this regard, in-game resources are not just tradable objects but can play the role of capital.

Players also acquire human capital as they become more powerful. Powerful guilds often recruit powerful players so that certain players can acquire better items which can only be acquired by the cooperation among many players.

== Other virtual economies ==
Virtual economies have also been said to exist in the "metagame" worlds of live action role-playing games and collectible card games. Other "metagame" currencies have cropped up in games such as Everquest and World of Warcraft. Dragon kill points or DKP are a semi-formal score-keeping system used by guilds in massively multiplayer online games. Players in these games are faced with large scale challenges, or raids, which may only be surmounted through the concerted effort of dozens of players at a time. Dragon kill points are not official currencies, but are created and managed by endgame guilds to manage distributions of rewards in those raids.

Virtual economies represented not only in MMORPG genre but also in online business simulation games (Virtonomics, Miniconomy). Simplified economy represented in almost all real-time strategies (StarCraft II: Heart of the Swarm, Command & Conquer: Red Alert 2) in a form of gathering and spending resources. Diablo III has its virtual economy as well which is represented by online game auction.

=== Moderation on social news and networking sites ===
On a number of discussion and networking sites, such as Slashdot, Reddit, care2 and Yahoo! Answers, points are gained through the garnering of trust evidenced in upward moderations of posted content; however, as stated by Slashdot co-founder CmdrTaco, his implementation of user moderation was not intended as a currency, even though it has evolved on other discussion-oriented sites into such a system. On some such sites, the accumulation of "karma points" can be redeemed in various ways for virtual services or objects, while most other sites do not contain a redemption system.

On some sites, points are gained for inviting new users to the site.

== Controversy ==
A game's synthetic economy often results in interaction with a "real" economy; characters, currency, and items may be sold and bought on online auction websites or purchased from standalone webshops. Since January 2007 users are no longer allowed to sell virtual goods of online games on eBay due to the ambiguous legal status of real world trading.

While many game developers, such as Blizzard (creator of World of Warcraft), prohibit the practice, it is common that goods and services within virtual economies will be sold on online auction sites and traded for real currencies.

According to standard conceptions of economic value (see the subjective theory of value), the goods and services of virtual economies do have a demonstrable value. Since players of these games are willing to substitute real economic resources of time and money (monthly fees) in exchange for these resources, by definition they have demonstrated utility to the user. Some virtual currencies have even accrued higher value and stability than some real world currencies. One example is Runescape's gold coins, which is more valuable and stable alternative to the Venezuelan Bolívar, with many Venezuelan's turning to selling Runescape gold to make a living.

In January 2010, Blizzard stepped up its offensive on account security scams with the launch of a new website. The new Battle.Net account security website hopes to highlight the importance of keeping it safe when it comes to subscribers' accounts.

These pages are part of a larger effort to provide you with the knowledge and tools necessary to identify and report threats to your account's safety, to spotlight ways in which we work to fulfill our security commitment, and to act as a helpful resource in case someone manages to steal account information from you.

Ongoing campaign by WoW fan sites to boycott gold ads on their sites is just one of several community efforts to raise awareness against crackers.

Gold sellers and leveling services are responsible for the vast majority of all account thefts, and they are the number-one source of World of Warcraft-related phishing attempts, spyware, and even credit card theft. Players who buy gold actively support spam, hacks, and keyloggers, and by doing so diminish the gameplay experience for everyone else.

On August 1, 2011, Blizzard Entertainment announced that their forthcoming MMORPG, Diablo III, will include a currency-based auction house, wherein players will be able to buy and sell in-game items for real money. Robert Bridenbecker, Vice President of Online Technologies at Blizzard, explained that the intent behind the effort is largely to reduce account thefts resulting from player interaction with third-party sites. An undisclosed fee structure including listing fees, sale fees, and cash-out fees will accompany the Auction House at launch, and all transactions will exist within the protected context of Blizzard's MMORPG. The "Real Money Auction House" (RMAH), as it is called by the Diablo III fanbase, will exist in the presence of a parallel auction house wherein items are exchanged for gold, the in-game currency. Accordingly, gold can be posted on the RMAH such that the two currencies may be exchanged for one another at the market rate less applicable fees.

Other virtual world developers officially sell virtual items and currency for real-world money. For example, the MMOG There has therebucks that sell for US dollars. If the currency in Second Life, the Linden Dollars, can be easily acquired with real money, the reverse is done through a market place owned by Linden Lab, but is not guaranteed, as the TOS of linden Lab explicitly says that Linden dollars are not redeemable. Rates would fluctuate based on supply and demand, but over the last few years they have remained fairly stable at around 265 Linden Dollars (L$) to the US Dollar, due to "money creation" by Linden Lab. The currency in Entropia Universe, Project Entropia Dollars (PED), could be bought and redeemed for real-world money at a rate of 10 PED for U.S$. 1. On December 14, 2004, an island in Project Entropia sold for U.S. $26,500 (£13,700). One gamer also purchased a virtual space station for U.S. $100,000 (£56,200) and plans to use it as a virtual nightclub. Another example was recently cited on CNBC that one seller was selling a Pokémon Go account for $999,999.

Many Korean virtual worlds (such as Flyff) and other worlds outside that country (such as Archlord and Achaea, Dreams of Divine Lands) operate entirely by selling items to players for real money. Such items generally cannot be transferred and are often used only as a means to represent a Premium subscription via a method which is easily integrated into the game engine.

These intersections with real economies remain controversial. Markets that capitalize in gaming are not widely accepted by the gaming industry. Reasons for this controversy are varied. Firstly, the developers of the games often consider themselves as trying to present a fantasy experience, so the involvement of real world transactions takes away from it. Further, in most games, it would be unacceptable to offer another player real currency in order to have them play a certain way (e.g., in a game of Monopoly between friends, offering another player a real dollar in exchange for a property on the board); and for this to be necessary or valuable may indicate a Kingmaker scenario within the game. However, such rules of etiquette need not apply, and in practice they often don't, to massive game worlds with thousands of players who know one another only through the game system.

Further and more involved issues revolve around the issue of how (or if) real-money trading subjects the virtual economy to laws relating to the real economy. Some argue that to allow in-game items to have monetary values makes these games, essentially, gambling venues, which would be subject to legal regulation as such. Another issue is the impact of taxation that may apply if in-game items are seen as having real value. If (for example) a magic sword is considered to have real-world value, a player who kills a powerful monster to earn such a sword could find himself being charged tax on the value of the sword, as would be normal for a "prize winning". This would make it impossible for any player of the game not to participate in real-money trading.

A third issue is the involvement of the world's developer or maintenance staff in such transactions. Since a developer may change the virtual world any time, ban a player, delete items, or even simply take the world down never to return, the issue of their responsibility in the case where real money investments are lost through items being lost or becoming inaccessible is significant. Richard Bartle argued that this aspect negates the whole idea of ownership in virtual worlds, and thus in the absence of real ownership no real trade may occur. Some developers have acted deliberately to delete items that have been traded for money, as in Final Fantasy XI, where a task force was set up to delete characters involved in selling in-game currency for real-world money.

LindeX Market Data

However, Second Life has shown a legal example which may indicate that the developer can be in part held responsible for such losses. Second Life at one stage, offered and advertised the ability to "own virtual land", which was purchased for real money. In 2007, Marc Bragg, an attorney, was banned from Second Life; in response he sued the developers for thereby depriving him of his land, which he – based on the developers' own statements – "owned". The lawsuit ended with a settlement in which Bragg was re-admitted to Second Life. The details of the final settlement were not released, but the word "own" was removed from all advertising as a result. (Bragg purchased his land directly from the developers, and thus they were not an uninvolved third party in his transactions.)

== See also ==
- Cryptocurrency
- Digital currency
- Electronic money
- Simulated reality
- Social simulation
- Virtual reality
- Virtual world
- Virtual currency
