= National Board of Review Award for Best Documentary Film =

Annual US film award

The National Board of Review Award for Best Documentary Feature is one of the annual awards given (since 1940) to the producer of the film by the National Board of Review of Motion Pictures.

== Notes ==
- ≠ Academy Award for Best Documentary Feature nominee
- ≈ Academy Award for Best Documentary Feature winner
- ± Nominated in other Oscar categories
- ° Emmy winner
- × Sundance winner
- ÷ Academy Award for Best Documentary (Short Subject) winner/nominee
- § National Film Registry inductee

== List of winners ==
- 1940: The Fight for Life
- 1941: Target for Tonight; The Forgotten Village; Kukan; The Land
- 1942: Moscow Strikes Back≈; Native Land; Anzacs in Action
- 1943: Desert Victory≈; The Battle of Russia≠; Prelude to War≈; Saludos Amigos±; The Silent Village
- 1944: Memphis Belle: A Story of a Flying Fortress§; Attack! The Battle for New Britain; With the Marines at Tarawa÷; Battle for the Marianas; Tunisian Victory

=== 1980s ===
Year (ceremony)	Winner	Director(s)
1987 (59th)	Hail! Hail! Rock ‘n’ Roll	Taylor Hackford
1988 (60th)	The Thin Blue Line§	Errol Morris
1989 (61st)	Roger & Me§	Michael Moore

=== 1990s ===
Year (ceremony)	Winner	Director(s)
1990 (62nd)	—N/a	—N/a
1991 (63rd)	Hearts of Darkness: A Filmmaker's Apocalypse°	Fax Bahr and George Hickenlooper
1992 (64th)	Brother's Keeper×	Joe Berlinger and Bruce Sinofsky
1993 (65th)	The War Room≠	Chris Hegedus and D. A. Pennebaker
1994 (66th)	Hoop Dreams±×§	Steve James
1995 (67th)	Crumb×	Terry Zwigoff
1996 (68th)	Paradise Lost: The Child Murders at Robin Hood Hills°	Joe Berlinger and Bruce Sinofsky
1997 (69th)	Fast, Cheap & Out of Control	Errol Morris
1998 (70th)	Wild Man Blues	Barbara Kopple
1999 (71st)	Buena Vista Social Club≠§	Wim Wenders

=== 2000s ===
Year (ceremony)	Winner	Director(s)
2000 (72nd)	The Life and Times of Hank Greenberg	Aviva Kempner
2001 (73rd)	The Endurance	George Butler
2002 (74th)	Bowling for Columbine≈	Michael Moore
2003 (75th)	The Fog of War≈§	Errol Morris
2004 (76th)	Born into Brothels≈	Zana Briski and Ross Kauffman
2005 (77th)	March of the Penguins (La marche de l’empereur)≈	Luc Jacquet
2006 (78th)	An Inconvenient Truth≈	Davis Guggenheim
2007 (79th)	Body of War	Phil Donahue and Ellen Spiro
2008 (80th)	Man on Wire≈	James Marsh
2009 (81st)	The Cove≈	Louie Psihoyos

=== 2010s ===
Year (ceremony)	Winner	Director(s)
2010 (82nd)	Waiting for “Superman”	Davis Guggenheim
2011 (83rd)	Paradise Lost 3: Purgatory≠	Joe Berlinger and Bruce Sinofsky
2012 (84th)	Searching for Sugar Man≈	Malik Bendjelloul
2013 (85th)	Stories We Tell	Sarah Polley
2014 (86th)	Life Itself	Steve James
2015 (87th)	Amy≈	Asif Kapadia
2016 (88th)	O.J.: Made in America≈°	Ezra Edelman
2017 (89th)	Jane°	Brett Morgen
2018 (90th)	RBG≠±°	Betsy West and Julie Cohen
2019 (91st)	Maiden	Alex Holmes

=== 2020s ===
Year (ceremony)	Winner	Director(s)
2020 (92nd)	Time≠	Garrett Bradley
2021 (93rd)	Summer of Soul≈	Questlove
2022 (94th)	"Sr."	Chris Smith
2023 (95th)	Still: A Michael J. Fox Movie°	Davis Guggenheim
2024 (96th)	Sugarcane≠	Julian Brave NoiseCat and Emily Kassie
2025 (97th)	Cover-Up	Laura Poitras and Mark Obenhaus

== See also ==
- Academy Award for Best Documentary Feature
- BAFTA Award for Best Documentary
- Cinema Eye Honors Awards
- Critics' Choice Documentary Awards
- IDA Documentary Awards
- Gotham Independent Film Award for Best Documentary
- Independent Spirit Award for Best Documentary Feature
