= Conversations with a Killer =

Conversations with a Killer may refer to:

- Conversations with a Killer: The John Wayne Gacy Tapes, a 2022 Netflix docu-series about serial killer John Wayne Gacy
- Conversations with a Killer: The Son of Sam Tapes, a 2025 Netflix docu-series about David Berkowitz aka the Son of Sam
- Conversations with a Killer: The Ted Bundy Tapes, a 2019 Netflix docu-series about Ted Bundy
- The Iceman Confesses: Conversations with a Killer, a 1992 HBO documentary about Richard Kuklinski
- Ted Bundy: Conversations with a Killer, a 2000 true crime book by Hugh Aynesworth and Stephen G. Michaud
