= Metallica: This Monster Lives =

2004 book

- Author: Joe Berlinger
- Language: English
- Genre: Non-fiction
- Publisher: St. Martin's Press
- Publication date: 2004
- Publication place: United States
- Media type: Print (hardback)
- Pages: Paperback: 288
- ISBN: 0-312-33311-0 (paperback edition)

Metallica: This Monster Lives is a 2004 book written by Joe Berlinger and Greg Milner. The book describes how Berlinger recorded the feature-length film Metallica: Some Kind of Monster in collaboration with the music band Metallica.

The book follows the journey of the writer (and film-maker), his film partner Bruce Sinofsky, and Metallica during the creation of the film. The book commences with a description of how Berlinger and Sinofsky first met the band Metallica in 1999 for the 2003 Summer Sanitarium Tour.

Berlinger and Sinofsky's relationship was troubled, exacerbated by Berlinger's decision to direct the unpopular sequel to The Blair Witch Project. At the start of filming, the relationship between the band members, especially between vocalist James Hetfield and drummer Lars Ulrich, was in a similarly perilous position after bassist Jason Newsted quit the band and the long-standing disputes between the remaining members threaten to escalate.

After amassing over 1,600 hours of footage for what was originally supposed to be a short promo for the band's new album, the film's editing team had to rapidly change plans as the footage changed from the promo to a TV series and eventually to a full feature film.

The book's title is a reference to a line in the band's song "Some Kind of Monster" which the film is named after.
