= Matthew Helderman =

American entrepreneur, financier, and film producer

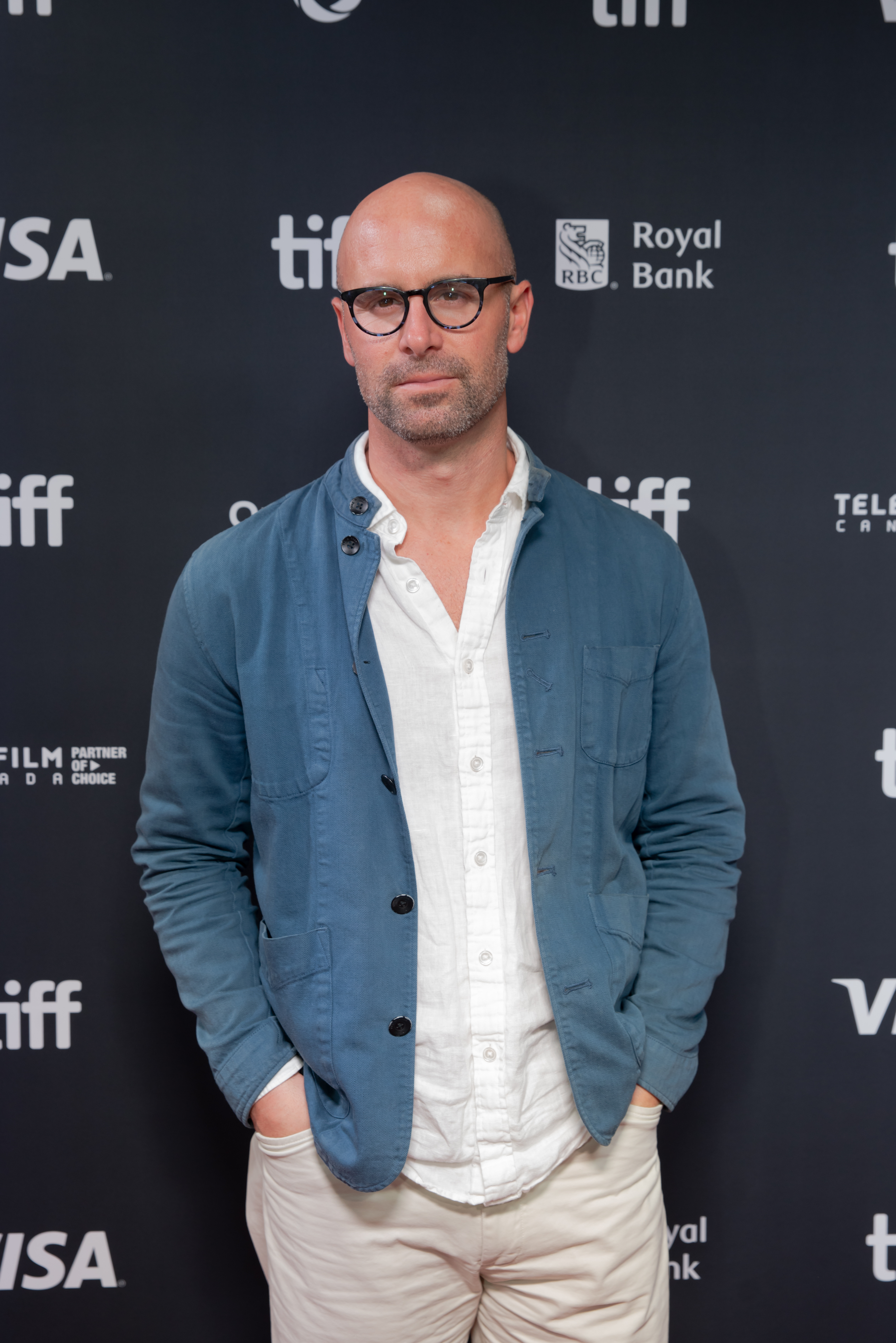
- Helderman in 2025
- Born: Matthew Helderman; 1987 (age 38–39); Fairfield, Connecticut, U.S.
- Education: Lake Forest College
- Occupations: Entrepreneur; Financier; Film producer
- Organizations: BondIt Media Capital; Buffalo 8
- Known for: BondIt Media Capital; Buffalo 8 ABS Payroll
- Notable work: Terrifier 3 Woman of the Hour; Rodney King; Street Gang: How We Got to Sesame Street; Clerks III; Loving Vincent; The Fallout

Matthew Helderman (born 1987) is an American entrepreneur, financier, and film producer known for 3022, The Pale Door, Cosmic Sin, Street Gang: How We Got to Sesame Street, and Redemption Day. He is the founder of Buffalo 8 and BondIt Media Capital.

== Early life and education ==
Helderman was born in 1987 and grew up in Fairfield, Connecticut. Helderman attended The Gunnery (now The Frederick Gunn School) in Washington, Connecticut, before later attending Lake Forest College in Lake Forest, Illinois, where he studied philosophy and English and played collegiate ice hockey. While at the college, he wrote undergraduate theses on the films of Wes Anderson and Woody Allen, the latter examining Allen's work through the lens of modern philosophy. He graduated in 2011 with a Bachelor of Arts.

Between his junior and senior years, Helderman wrote, directed, and co-produced his first feature film, The Alumni Chapter, a low-budget ensemble drama about recent college graduates struggling to find work during the Great Recession. He financed the project partly by selling a large portion of his personal DVD collection and by pitching the script to film societies and small production companies. Shot on the Lake Forest College campus, the film premiered at the Portage Theater in Chicago in February 2011.

== Career ==
=== Buffalo 8 ===
Helderman founded Buffalo 8 Productions in 2010, while still an undergraduate, initially as a vehicle to produce The Alumni Chapter. After graduating in 2011, he relocated the company to the Los Angeles area and, with co-founder Luke Taylor, expanded it into an independent media studio.

Buffalo 8 was one of the production entities behind Spike Lee's 2017 Netflix film Rodney King, a filmed version of Roger Guenveur Smith's one-man stage play, on which Helderman served as executive producer. In 2019, Helderman uncovered previously unreleased audio and case files related to the Jeffrey Dahmer murder trials. He and Buffalo 8 later worked with director Joe Berlinger on the Conversations With a Killer series, with RadicalMedia overseeing production and Helderman and Buffalo 8 serving as executive producers.

=== BondIt ===
In 2013, Helderman and Taylor co-founded BondIt Media Capital, an independent film and media finance firm.

As CEO of BondIt Media Capital, Helderman has overseen the deployment of hundreds of millions of dollars into film, television, music, and live entertainment projects. Under his leadership, BondIt expanded its institutional financing relationships, including a partial sale to the public company Accord Financial and the expansion of its credit facilities through partnerships with private investment firms and hedge fund lenders.

In 2017, Helderman co-managed the acquisition of entertainment payroll company ABS Payroll. He later served as an Executive Director and board member, overseeing the majority sale of the business to Vensure Employer Services, a professional employer organization backed by Stone Point Capital and investment entities associated with Mitt Romney.

Helderman expanded BondIt Media Capital and Buffalo 8 into a vertically integrated entertainment finance and media services platform spanning production, financing, payroll, post-production, distribution, and sales representation.

Helderman has written and spoken on independent film finance, media entrepreneurship, and entertainment lending at major conferences worldwide, including the Cannes Film Festival, YPO, and SXSW.

BondIt's financing credits include the Oscar-nominated animated feature Loving Vincent, Roland Emmerich's Midway, the Netflix drama To the Bone, The Peanut Butter Falcon, Clerks III, and the Mel Gibson-led thriller On the Line.

In February 2026, MEP Capital Management, a New York-based private investment firm, acquired a majority ownership stake in BondIt Media Capital. The following day, Media Capital Technologies announced that it had provided BondIt with a $100 million credit facility to support the company's continued growth.

== Selected filmography ==
- The Alumni Chapter (2011)
- Big Kill (2019)
- Trauma Center (2019)
- 3022 (2019)
- Becky (2020)
- Indigo Valley (2020)
- Hooking Up (2020)
- The Reckoning (2020)
- The Legion (2020)
- American Siege (2020)
- Seized (2020)
- The Pale Door (2020)
- Givers of Death (2020)
- Cosmic Sin (2021)
- Apex (2021)
- Locked In (2021)
- Midnight in the Switchgrass (2021)
- Out of Death (2021)
- The Dead of Night (2021)
- Cosmic Sin (2021)
- Body Brokers (2021)
- Dual (2021)
- Panama (2021)
- The Commando (2021)
- Ida Red (2021)
- Street Gang: How We Got to Sesame Street (2021)
- Redemption Day (2021)
- The Fallout (2021)
- Book of Love (2022)
- Conversations with a Killer (2022)
