= Eric Esrailian =

American physician

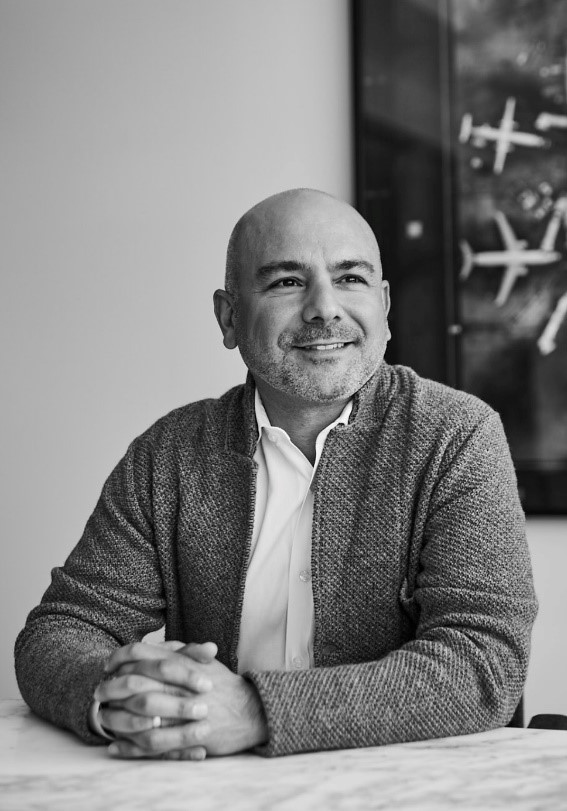
Eric Esrailian

Eric Esrailian is an American physician at the David Geffen School of Medicine at the University of California, Los Angeles (UCLA). He is also an Emmy-nominated film producer and is active in charity and community service activities in Los Angeles.

== Early life and education ==
Esrailian is of Armenian descent. He completed his undergraduate education at University of California, Berkeley. He then graduated from the Loma Linda University School of Medicine. He completed a residency in internal medicine at the University of Southern California. He was named intern, junior resident, and senior resident of the year during all three years of his residency training. He completed his gastroenterology fellowship at UCLA, where he also obtained a Masters of Public Health degree. He is also a graduate of the Executive Program in Management from the UCLA Anderson School of Management.

== Career ==
Esrailian is a full-time faculty member at the David Geffen School of Medicine at UCLA. He is described as having patient care, teaching, and administrative positions. He was appointed by Governor Arnold Schwarzenegger to the Medical Board of California and served from 2010 to 2011. In 2017, UCLA designated Esrailian as one of its UCLA Optimists and notable alumni, leading faculty, visionary partners, and advanced scholars.

Esrailian has led philanthropic efforts connecting health, human rights, education, and the arts around the world. Esrailian has also launched a leadership speaker series called 'Leaders of Tomorrow' at UCLA, which emphasizes essential leadership skills through his experiences and those of some of his friends who are the most influential and successful leaders in the Los Angeles community. In October 2020, Esrailian led a conversation on 'Grit: Why It Matters', featuring leaders such as Kareem Abdul-Jabbar, Brad Gilbert and various deans from the UCLA campus. In 2021, he discussed the topic 'Doing The Right Thing' with Amal Clooney.

Esrailian is Armenian, and he is recognized for global philanthropic efforts and work involving social justice, particularly in the Armenian community. A major focus appears to have been securing recognition of the Armenian genocide by the U.S. government, and the Armenian National Committee of America has recognized his influence on that milestone. On April 24, 2021, on the 106th commemoration of the Armenian genocide, Joe Biden added the Executive Branch's recognition as president. President Armen Sarkissian thanked Eric Esrailian, Kim Kardashian and Cher for their efforts.

Esrailian established The Promise Institute for Human Rights at UCLA School of Law in 2017. The institute is the hub for all human rights scholarship and advocacy in the university and is supported by proceeds from the feature film Esrailian produced in 2016, The Promise, which was set during the Armenian Genocide. Celebrities, some of whom are of Armenian descent, supported and promoted the film, including Cher, George Clooney, Leonardo DiCaprio, Barbra Streisand, Don Cheadle, and Andre Agassi. Under Esrailian's direction, UCLA also unveiled The Promise Armenian Institute at UCLA in 2019, which was created with a $20 million gift from the estate of philanthropist and entrepreneur Kirk Kerkorian, who was a close friend of Esrailian. In 2020, Esrailian led members from this institute and UCLA Health to form an interdisciplinary team to provide both immediate medical disaster relief and long-term humanitarian aid and infrastructure support to assist in the stabilization of the healthcare capacity in Armenia during and after war.

Amid reemerging violence in Artsakh (Nagorno-Karabakh) in 2020, Esrailian organized a PSA with the help of his friend - singer and Armenian activist Cher - which called for the U.S. to cut off aid and weapon sales to Azerbaijan and impose sanctions. Esrailian has also drafted statements for his close friends and Hollywood actors of Armenian descent, to call on the U.S. for more support to Yerevan, the capital of Armenia. In 2023, Esrailian wrote an Op-Ed with Cher for Newsweek describing the need to support Armenians in the face of a potential humanitarian catastrophe due to Azerbaijan's blockade of the Lachin corridor.

Esrailian joined the Board of Directors and is currently vice-chair of the Hammer Museum in 2012, which is an art museum and cultural center in Los Angeles. Esrailian is also on the board of directors of the X Prize Foundation, a non-profit organization that designs and manages public competitions and on the board of trustees for the Academy Museum of Motion Pictures. Esrailian is on the central board of the Armenian General Benevolent Union (AGBU) which is the world's largest non-profit organization devoted to upholding the Armenian heritage. Furthermore, Esrailian is also on the Motion Picture & Television Fund (MPTF) Board of Governors and the board of directors for the Clooney Foundation for Justice where he was a host of the inaugural Albie Awards in honor of Justice Albie Sachs. Esrailian, Sean Parker, and Casey Wasserman, were highlighted as innovative and entrepreneurial philanthropists as part of UCLA's magazine about the impact of philanthropy on the future of medicine and science.

Esrailian was on the Board of Directors of LA 2024. With combined efforts from the Board, they were able to make Los Angeles the host city for the 2028 Olympic and Paralympic games. Esrailian has also been involved in establishing additional programs with UCLA, such as the Leaders of Tomorrow series and a medical school scholarship program which focuses on teaching leadership skills to UCLA students, trainees, and stakeholders via panels featuring influential and successful leaders in the Los Angeles community. Esrailian worked with the Kardashian family to launch the UCLA Robert G. Kardashian Center for Esophageal Health.

== Producer ==
In 2015, Esrailian was announced as a manager and producer for Kirk Kerkorian's production company which was set up to raise awareness about the Armenian genocide using a scripted film and documentary combination – Survival Pictures. He produced The Promise with Mike Medavoy. The epic film stars Golden Globe Award nominee Oscar Isaac and Academy Award and Golden Globe Award winner Christian Bale. In 2017, he produced Intent To Destroy with Joe Berlinger and Chip Rosenbloom. In 2019, Intent To Destroy was nominated for an Emmy for Outstanding Historical Documentary by the National Academy of Television Arts & Sciences (NATAS).

In 2019, Esrailian and his partners at Forgotten Man Films launched SOMM TV, a streaming service with original series, films, and masterclasses dedicated to food and wine.

In 2021, Esrailian produced Francesco about Pope Francis directed by Evgeny Afineevsky and distributed by Discovery+. The film also features Pope Francis' statements about the Armenian Genocide and pilgrimage to Armenia in 2016. In November 2021, Pope Francis awarded Esrailian with the Benemerenti Medal in Vatican City for his humanitarian efforts. He became the first person of Armenian descent to receive the honor.

In 2022, he produced Aurora's Sunrise about Armenian Genocide survivor Aurora Mardiganian. In 2024, he was named a co-founder of the Aurora Prize for Awakening Humanity alongside Noubar Afeyan. The prize is named after Mardiganian and is a global humanitarian award recognizing individuals for humanitarian work.
