= Bibliography of human cannibalism =

Bibliography of Human Cannibalism
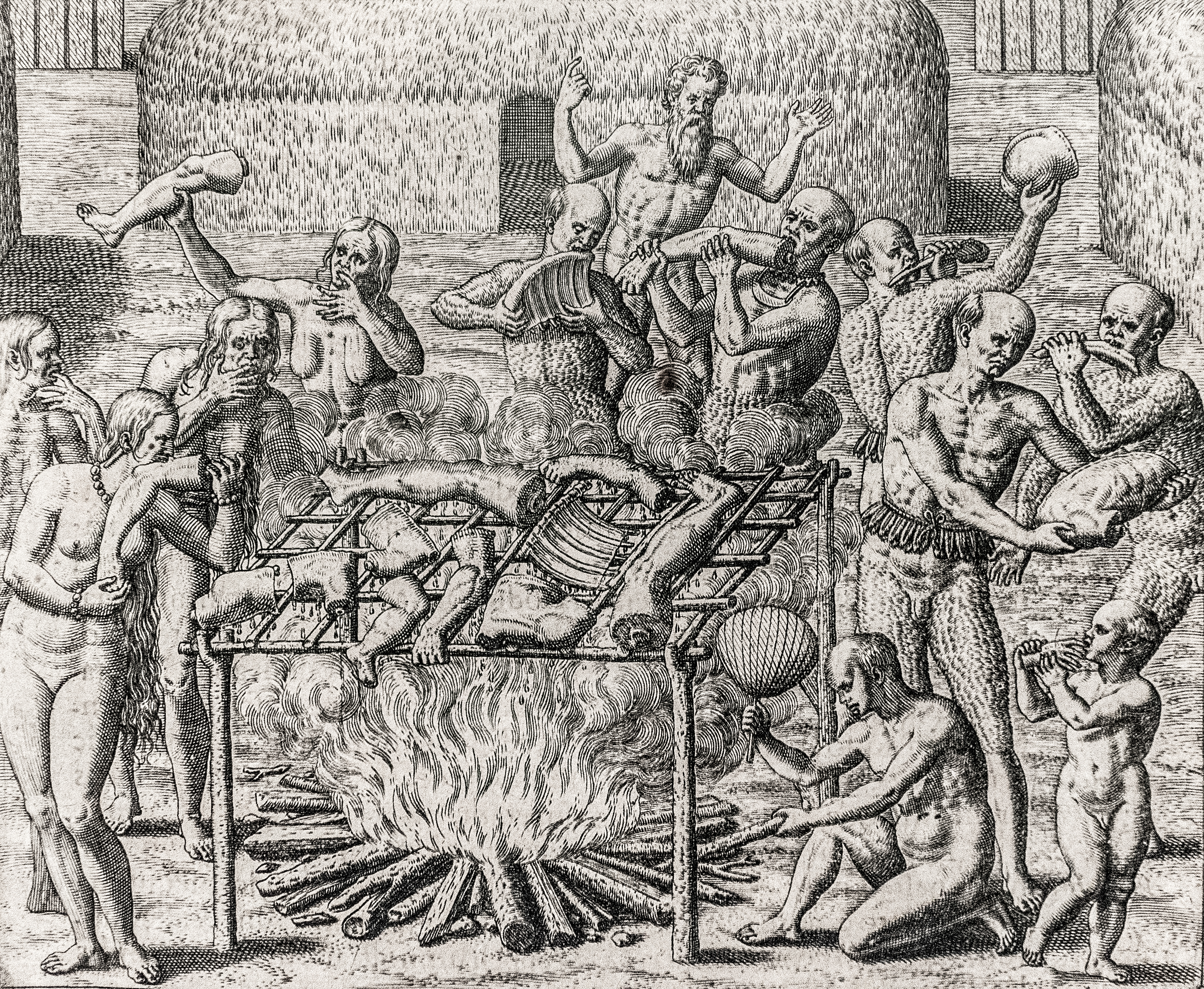
- Tupinambá cannibalism as depicted by Theodor de Bry, 1593
- Subject: Human cannibalism
- Scope: Books, journal articles, book chapters
- Period covered: Early Pleistocene – present
- Languages: English
- Related: List of incidents of cannibalism

This is a select bibliography of academic level books and journal articles, published mainly after World War II about the history of Human cannibalism and necessary historical context.

Human cannibalism is the act or practice of humans eating the flesh or internal organs of other human beings. A person who practices cannibalism is called a cannibal. The meaning of "cannibalism" has been extended into zoology to describe animals consuming parts of individuals of the same species as food.

Bibliography contains academic level English language books (including translations) and journal articles, published mainly post World War II. (Note: Works published before World War II should be limited to areas where there are no significant post-World War II books on the subject or when the work in question has significant historical merit.) Book entries may have references to reviews published in academic journals or major newspapers when these could be considered helpful. These reference reviews also function as a resource to find other works on this subject.

Works listed here are cited in the notes or bibliographies of scholarly sources. Each is published by an academic or major trade press, written by a recognized expert, or substantially reviewed in scholarly journals; borderline cases are omitted. A selection of primary sources is included. Many of the books below carry their own bibliographies; see Further reading section for longer ones, and External links section for historical sites and museums.

Citations follow APA style. (Note: Entries are in plain text APA 7 format without templates; templates are used only for reviews and notes.) Books have citations to academic journal or mainstream published reviews when available. For books only partly about the subject, give relevant chapter or section titles where useful and available. Translators of the original-language edition are included when possible. In cases where a title or name has appeared with more than one English spelling, the most recent published form is used and a footnote documents any earlier title under which the work appeared.

== General works ==
- Arens, W. (1979). The man-eating myth: Anthropology & anthropophagy. Oxford University Press.
- Avramescu, C. (2009). An intellectual history of cannibalism (A. I. Blyth, Trans.). Princeton University Press. (Original work published 2003) doi:10.1515/9781400833207
- Barker, F., Hulme, P., & Iversen, M. (Eds.). (1998). Cannibalism and the colonial world. Cambridge University Press.
- Chong, K. R. (1990). Cannibalism in China. Longwood Academic.
- Fuller, L. L. (1949). The case of the speluncean explorers. Harvard Law Review, 62(4), 616–645. JSTOR 1336025
- Kilgour, M. (1990). From communion to cannibalism: An anatomy of metaphors of incorporation. Princeton University Press. doi:10.1515/9781400860784
- Lestringant, F. (1997). Cannibals: The discovery and representation of the cannibal from Columbus to Jules Verne (R. Morris, Trans.). University of California Press. (Original work published 1994)
- Lu, M. (2013). Explaining the wrongness of cannibalism. American Catholic Philosophical Quarterly, 87(3), 433–458. doi:10.5840/acpq201387332
- Ó Gráda, C. (2015). Eating people is wrong, and other essays on famine, its past, and its future (ch. 1, "Eating people is wrong: Famine's darkest secret?", pp. 11–37). Princeton University Press. doi:10.1515/9781400865819
- Pickering, M. (2017). Cannibalism in the ethnographic record. In H. Callan (Ed.), The international encyclopedia of anthropology. Wiley. doi:10.1002/9781118924396.wbiea1993
- Schutt, B. (2017). Cannibalism: A perfectly natural history. Algonquin Books of Chapel Hill.
- Siefkes, C. (2022). Edible people: The historical consumption of slaves and foreigners and the cannibalistic trade in human flesh. Berghahn Books. doi:10.3167/9781800736139
- Sugg, R. (2011). Mummies, cannibals and vampires: The history of corpse medicine from the Renaissance to the Victorians. Routledge. doi:10.4324/9780203154182
- Tannahill, R. (1975). Flesh and blood: A history of the cannibal complex. Stein and Day.
- Wetmore, K. J., Jr. (2021). Eaters of the dead: Myths and realities of cannibal monsters. Reaktion Books.
- Wisnewski, J. J. (2004). A defense of cannibalism. Public Affairs Quarterly, 18(3), 265–272. JSTOR 40441385

== Prehistory and antiquity ==
=== Prehistoric Africa and Asia ===
- Boaz, N. T., & Ciochon, R. L. (2004). Dragon Bone Hill: An ice-age saga of Homo erectus (ch. 7, "The nature of humanness at Longgushan: Brain, language, fire, and cannibalism", pp. 124–141). Oxford University Press. doi:10.1093/acprof:oso/9780195152913.001.0001
- Boaz, N. T., Ciochon, R. L., Xu, Q., & Liu, J. (2004). Mapping and taphonomic analysis of the Homo erectus loci at Locality 1 Zhoukoudian, China. Journal of Human Evolution, 46(5), 519–549. doi:10.1016/j.jhevol.2004.01.007
- Pobiner, B., Pante, M., & Keevil, T. (2023). Early Pleistocene cut marked hominin fossil from Koobi Fora, Kenya. Scientific Reports, 13, Article 9896. doi:10.1038/s41598-023-35702-7
- White, T. D. (1986). Cut marks on the Bodo cranium: A case of prehistoric defleshing. American Journal of Physical Anthropology, 69(4), 503–509. doi:10.1002/ajpa.1330690410

=== Prehistoric Europe and the Mediterranean ===
- Baldwin, R. M. (2026). Nomoi and cannibalism in Herodotus' Histories. Histos, 20, 41–64. doi:10.29173/histos723
- Bello, S. M., Saladié, P., Cáceres, I., Rodríguez-Hidalgo, A., & Parfitt, S. A. (2015). Upper Palaeolithic ritualistic cannibalism at Gough's Cave (Somerset, UK): The human remains from head to toe. Journal of Human Evolution, 82, 170–189. doi:10.1016/j.jhevol.2015.02.016
- Bello, S. M., Wallduck, R., Parfitt, S. A., & Stringer, C. B. (2017). An Upper Palaeolithic engraved human bone associated with ritualistic cannibalism. PLoS ONE, 12(8), Article e0182127. doi:10.1371/journal.pone.0182127
- Bello, S. M. (2025). The archaeology of cannibalism: A review of the taphonomic traits associated with survival and ritualistic cannibalism. Journal of Archaeological Method and Theory, 32(1), Article 11. doi:10.1007/s10816-024-09676-3
- Boulestin, B., Zeeb-Lanz, A., Jeunesse, C., Haack, F., Arbogast, R.-M., & Denaire, A. (2009). Mass cannibalism in the Linear Pottery Culture at Herxheim (Palatinate, Germany). Antiquity, 83(322), 968–982. doi:10.1017/s0003598x00099282
- Boulestin, B., & Coupey, A.-S. (2015). Cannibalism in the Linear Pottery culture: The human remains from Herxheim. Archaeopress. JSTOR j.ctvr43kkd
- Carbonell, E., Cáceres, I., Lozano, M., Saladié, P., Rosell, J., Lorenzo, C., Vallverdú, J., Huguet, R., Canals, A., & Bermúdez de Castro, J. M. (2010). Cultural cannibalism as a paleoeconomic system in the European Lower Pleistocene: The case of Level TD6 of Gran Dolina (Sierra de Atapuerca, Burgos, Spain). Current Anthropology, 51(4), 539–549. doi:10.1086/653807
- Chapman, H. H. (2007). Josephus and the cannibalism of Mary (BJ 6.199–219). In J. Marincola (Ed.), A companion to Greek and Roman historiography (pp. 397–403). Wiley-Blackwell. doi:10.1002/9781405185110.ch41
- Cole, J. (2017). Assessing the calorific significance of episodes of human cannibalism in the Palaeolithic. Scientific Reports, 7, Article 44707. doi:10.1038/srep44707
- Cosnefroy, Q., Crevecoeur, I., Semal, P., Hajdinjak, M., Bossoms Mesa, A., Krause, J., Gnecchi-Ruscone, G. A., Posth, C., Bocherens, H., Devièse, T., & Rougier, H. (2025). Highly selective cannibalism in the Late Pleistocene of Northern Europe reveals Neandertals were targeted prey. Scientific Reports, 15, Article 40741. doi:10.1038/s41598-025-24460-3
- Defleur, A., White, T., Valensi, P., Slimak, L., & Crégut-Bonnoure, É. (1999). Neanderthal cannibalism at Moula-Guercy, Ardèche, France. Science, 286(5437), 128–131. doi:10.1126/science.286.5437.128
- Fernández-Jalvo, Y., Díez, J. C., Cáceres, I., & Rosell, J. (1999). Human cannibalism in the Early Pleistocene of Europe (Gran Dolina, Sierra de Atapuerca, Burgos, Spain). Journal of Human Evolution, 37(3–4), 591–622. doi:10.1006/jhev.1999.0324
- Hook, B. S. (2005). Oedipus and Thyestes among the philosophers: Incest and cannibalism in Plato, Diogenes, and Zeno. Classical Philology, 100(1), 17–40. doi:10.1086/431428
- Marginedas, F., Saladié, P., Połtowicz-Bobak, M., Terberger, T., Bobak, D., & Rodríguez-Hidalgo, A. (2025). New insights of cultural cannibalism amongst Magdalenian groups at Maszycka Cave, Poland. Scientific Reports, 15, Article 2351. doi:10.1038/s41598-025-86093-w
- Marsh, W. A., & Bello, S. (2023). Cannibalism and burial in the late Upper Palaeolithic: Combining archaeological and genetic evidence. Quaternary Science Reviews, 319, Article 108309. doi:10.1016/j.quascirev.2023.108309
- Murphy, E. M., & Mallory, J. P. (2000). Herodotus and the cannibals. Antiquity, 74(284), 388–394. doi:10.1017/s0003598x00059470
- Rosas, A., Martínez-Maza, C., Bastir, M., García-Tabernero, A., Lalueza-Fox, C., Huguet, R., Ortiz, J. E., Julià, R., Soler, V., de Torres, T., Martínez, E., Cañaveras, J. C., Sánchez-Moral, S., Cuezva, S., Lario, J., Santamaría, D., de la Rasilla, M., & Fortea, J. (2006). Paleobiology and comparative morphology of a late Neandertal sample from El Sidrón, Asturias, Spain. Proceedings of the National Academy of Sciences, 103(51), 19266–19271. doi:10.1073/pnas.0609662104
- Rougier, H., Crevecoeur, I., Beauval, C., Posth, C., Flas, D., Wißing, C., Furtwängler, A., Germonpré, M., Gómez-Olivencia, A., Semal, P., van der Plicht, J., Bocherens, H., & Krause, J. (2016). Neandertal cannibalism and Neandertal bones used as tools in Northern Europe. Scientific Reports, 6, Article 29005. doi:10.1038/srep29005
- Russell, M. D. (1987). Mortuary practices at the Krapina Neandertal site. American Journal of Physical Anthropology, 72(3), 381–397. doi:10.1002/ajpa.1330720311
- Saladié, P., & Rodríguez-Hidalgo, A. (2017). Archaeological evidence for cannibalism in prehistoric western Europe: From Homo antecessor to the Bronze Age. Journal of Archaeological Method and Theory, 24(4), 1034–1071. doi:10.1007/s10816-016-9306-y
- Schulting, R. J., Fernández-Crespo, T., Ordoño, J., Brock, F., Kellow, A., Snoeck, C., Cartwright, I. R., Walker, D., Loe, L., & Audsley, T. (2025). "The darker angels of our nature": Early Bronze Age butchered human remains from Charterhouse Warren, Somerset, UK. Antiquity, 99(403), 101–117. doi:10.15184/aqy.2024.180
- Trinkaus, E. (1985). Cannibalism and burial at Krapina. Journal of Human Evolution, 14(2), 203–216. doi:10.1016/s0047-2484(85)80007-5
- Villa, P., Bouville, C., Courtin, J., Helmer, D., Mahieu, E., Shipman, P., Belluomini, G., & Branca, M. (1986). Cannibalism in the Neolithic. Science, 233(4762), 431–437. doi:10.1126/science.233.4762.431

=== Prehistoric Americas ===
- Billman, B. R., Lambert, P. M., & Leonard, B. L. (2000). Cannibalism, warfare, and drought in the Mesa Verde region during the twelfth century A.D. American Antiquity, 65(1), 145–178. JSTOR 2694812
- Dongoske, K. E., Martin, D. L., & Ferguson, T. J. (2000). Critique of the claim of cannibalism at Cowboy Wash. American Antiquity, 65(1), 179–190. JSTOR 2694813
- Lambert, P. M., Leonard, B. L., Billman, B. R., Marlar, R. A., Newman, M. E., & Reinhard, K. J. (2000). Response to critique of the claim of cannibalism at Cowboy Wash. American Antiquity, 65(2), 397–406. JSTOR 2694066
- Marlar, R. A., Leonard, B. L., Billman, B. R., Lambert, P. M., & Marlar, J. E. (2000). Biochemical evidence of cannibalism at a prehistoric Puebloan site in southwestern Colorado. Nature, 407(6800), 74–78. doi:10.1038/35024064
- Turner, C. G., II, & Turner, J. A. (1999). Man corn: Cannibalism and violence in the prehistoric American Southwest. University of Utah Press.
- White, T. D. (1992). Prehistoric cannibalism at Mancos 5MTUMR-2346. Princeton University Press. doi:10.1515/9781400852925

=== Prehistoric Pacific ===
- DeGusta, D. (1999). Fijian cannibalism: Osteological evidence from Navatu. American Journal of Physical Anthropology, 110(2), 215–241. doi:10.1002/(sici)1096-8644(199910)110:2<215::aid-ajpa7>3.0.co;2-d
- DeGusta, D. (2000). Fijian cannibalism and mortuary ritual: Bioarchaeological evidence from Vunda. International Journal of Osteoarchaeology, 10(1), 76–92. doi:10.1002/(sici)1099-1212(200001/02)10:1<76::aid-oa506>3.0.co;2-#
- Jones, S., Walsh-Haney, H., & Quinn, R. (2015). Kana tamata or feasts of men: An interdisciplinary approach for identifying cannibalism in prehistoric Fiji. International Journal of Osteoarchaeology, 25(2), 127–145. doi:10.1002/oa.2269
- Mead, S., Stumpf, M. P. H., Whitfield, J., Beck, J. A., Poulter, M., Campbell, T., Uphill, J. B., Goldstein, D., Alpers, M., Fisher, E. M. C., & Collinge, J. (2003). Balancing selection at the prion protein gene consistent with prehistoric kurulike epidemics. Science, 300(5619), 640–643. doi:10.1126/science.1083320

== Middle Ages ==
=== Medieval Europe and the Middle East ===
- Ambrisco, A. S. (1999). Cannibalism and cultural encounters in Richard Coeur de Lion. Journal of Medieval and Early Modern Studies, 29(3), 499–528.
- Heng, G. (1998). Cannibalism, the First Crusade, and the genesis of medieval romance. differences, 10(1), 98–174. doi:10.1215/10407391-10-1-98
- Marvin, J. (1998). Cannibalism as an aspect of famine in two English chronicles. In M. Carlin & J. T. Rosenthal (Eds.), Food and eating in medieval Europe. Hambledon Press. doi:10.5040/9781472598868.ch-005
- Mayrhofer, S. (2013). "What, is Sarezyns flesch thus good?": Cannibalism and the humors in Richard Cœr de Lyon. eHumanista, 25, 75–90.
- Montanari, A. A. (2021). The medieval roots of anthropophagy: Stereotypes, metaphors and practices. In G. Champion (Ed.), Interdisciplinary essays on cannibalism (pp. 83–99). Routledge. doi:10.4324/9781003002154-9
- Mortimer, K. (2022). Digesting cannibalism: Revisiting representations of man-eating crusaders in narrative sources for the First Crusade. In A. Buck & T. W. Smith (Eds.), Chronicle, crusade, and the Latin East: Essays in honour of Susan B. Edgington (pp. 109–130). Brepols. doi:10.1484/m.outremer-eb.5.128884
- Presciutti, D. B. (2015). Domesticating cannibalism: Visual rhetorics of madness and maternal infanticide in fifteenth-century Italy. Journal of Medieval and Early Modern Studies, 45(1), 159–195. doi:10.1215/10829636-2830064
- Price, M. L. (2003). Consuming passions: The uses of cannibalism in late medieval and early modern Europe. Routledge. doi:10.4324/9780203493939
- Roby, M. (2019). Eating people and feeling sorry: Cannibalism, contrition, and the didactic Donestre in the Old English Wonders of the East and Latin Mirabilia. In R. Wehlau (Ed.), Darkness, depression, and descent in Anglo-Saxon England (pp. 167–206). Medieval Institute Publications. doi:10.1515/9783110661972-010
- Rubenstein, J. (2008). Cannibals and crusaders. French Historical Studies, 31(4), 525–552. doi:10.1215/00161071-2008-005
- Selçukoğlu, A. (2026). Cannibalism in the Middle Ages: Notes about the historical reasons and psychology of eating human flesh. Journal of Universal History Studies, 9(1), 1–29. doi:10.38000/juhis.1646152
- Szombathy, Z. (2015). Eating people is wrong: Some eyewitness reports of cannibalism in Arabic sources. In R. Gleave & I. Kristó-Nagy (Eds.), Violence in Islamic thought from the Qur'an to the Mongols (pp. 200–225). Edinburgh University Press. doi:10.3366/edinburgh/9780748694235.003.0013
- Tattersall, J. (1988). Anthropophagi and eaters of raw flesh in French literature of the crusade period: Myth, tradition and reality. Medium Ævum, 57(2), 240–253. JSTOR 43629210

=== Medieval Asia ===
- Barrett, T. H. (2015). Sima Guang 司馬光 and Ennin 圓仁 on reports of imperial cannibalism: A correction. Studies in Chinese Religions, 1(3), 203–208. doi:10.1080/23729988.2015.1090103
- Knapp, K. N. (2014). Chinese filial cannibalism: A Silk Road import? In D. C. Wong & G. Heldt (Eds.), China and beyond in the mediaeval period: Cultural crossings and inter-regional connections. Manohar; Cambria Press.

== Modern ==
=== Africa and the Atlantic slave trade ===
- Allina, E. (2011). The Zimba, the Portuguese, and other cannibals in late sixteenth-century southeast Africa. Journal of Southern African Studies, 37(2), 211–227. doi:10.1080/03057070.2011.579433
- Au, S. (2017). Cutting the flesh: Surgery, autopsy and cannibalism in the Belgian Congo. Medical History, 61(2), 295–312. doi:10.1017/mdh.2017.5
- Barcia, M. (2021). White cannibalism in the illegal slave trade: The peculiar case of the Portuguese schooner Arrogante in 1837. New West Indian Guide, 96(1–2), 1–28. doi:10.1163/22134360-bja10002
- Ellis, S. (1999). The mask of anarchy: The destruction of Liberia and the religious dimension of an African civil war. New York University Press.
- Keefer, K. H. B. (2024). Cannibalism myths, empire, and identity in colonial Sierra Leone. Lexington Books. doi:10.5771/9781666965797
- Staller, J. (2019). Converging on cannibals: Terrors of slaving in Atlantic Africa, 1509–1670. Ohio University Press. JSTOR j.ctv224tw8s
- Thornton, J. (2003). Cannibals, witches, and slave traders in the Atlantic world. William and Mary Quarterly, 60(2), 273. JSTOR 3491764
- White, L. (2000). Speaking with vampires: Rumor and history in colonial Africa (ch. 9, "Class struggle and cannibalism: Storytelling and history writing on the Copperbelts of colonial Northern Rhodesia and the Belgian Congo", pp. 269–306). University of California Press. doi:10.1525/9780520922297

=== Modern Americas ===
- Abler, T. S. (1980). Iroquois cannibalism: Fact not fiction. Ethnohistory, 27(4), 309–316. JSTOR 481728
- Abler, T. S. (1992). Scalping, torture, cannibalism and rape: An ethnohistorical analysis of conflicting cultural values in war. Anthropologica, 34(1), 3. JSTOR 25605630
- Beaver, D. (2002). Flesh or fantasy: Cannibalism and the meanings of violence. Ethnohistory, 49(3), 671–685. doi:10.1215/00141801-49-3-671
- Boucher, P. P. (1992). Cannibal encounters: Europeans and Island Caribs, 1492–1763. Johns Hopkins University Press.
- Forsyth, D. W. (1983). The beginnings of Brazilian anthropology: Jesuits and Tupinamba cannibalism. Journal of Anthropological Research, 39(2), 147–178. doi:10.1086/jar.39.2.3629965
- Forsyth, D. W. (1985). Three cheers for Hans Staden: The case for Brazilian cannibalism. Ethnohistory, 32(1), 17. JSTOR 482091
- Herrmann, R. B. (Ed.). (2019). To feast on us as their prey: Cannibalism and the early modern Atlantic. University of Arkansas Press.
- Hulme, P. (1986). Colonial encounters: Europe and the native Caribbean, 1492–1797 (ch. 1, "Columbus and the cannibals", pp. 13–44). Methuen.
- Isaac, B. L. (2002). Cannibalism among Aztecs and their neighbors: Analysis of the 1577–1586 "Relaciones geográficas" for Nueva España and Nueva Galicia provinces. Journal of Anthropological Research, 58(2), 203–224. doi:10.1086/jar.58.2.3631036
- Isaac, B. L. (2005). Aztec cannibalism: Nahua versus Spanish and mestizo accounts in the Valley of Mexico. Ancient Mesoamerica, 16(1), 1–10. doi:10.1017/s0956536105050030
- Martel, H. E. (2006). Hans Staden's captive soul: Identity, imperialism, and rumors of cannibalism in sixteenth-century Brazil. Journal of World History, 17(1), 51–69. doi:10.1353/jwh.2006.0031
- Moore, R. B. (1973). Carib "cannibalism": A study in anthropological stereotyping. Caribbean Studies, 13(3), 117–135. JSTOR 25612556
- Myers, R. A. (1984). Island Carib cannibalism. New West Indian Guide, 58(3–4), 147–184. doi:10.1163/13822373-90002079
- Smallman, S. (2014). Dangerous spirits: The windigo in myth and history. Heritage House.
- Watson, K. L. (2015). Insatiable appetites: Imperial encounters with cannibals in the North Atlantic world. New York University Press. doi:10.18574/nyu/9780814770740.001.0001
- Whitehead, N. L. (1984). Carib cannibalism: The historical evidence. Journal de la Société des Américanistes, 70(1), 69–87. doi:10.3406/jsa.1984.2239
- Whitehead, N. L. (2000). Hans Staden and the cultural politics of cannibalism. Hispanic American Historical Review, 80(4), 721–751. doi:10.1215/00182168-80-4-721

=== Modern Asia ===
- Dikötter, F. (2010). Mao's great famine: The history of China's most devastating catastrophe, 1958–1962 (ch. 36, "Cannibalism"). Walker & Company.
- Edgerton-Tarpley, K. (2008). Tears from iron: Cultural responses to famine in nineteenth-century China (ch. 9, "Eating culture: Cannibalism and the semiotics of starvation, 1870–2001", pp. 211–233). University of California Press. doi:10.1525/california/9780520253025.001.0001
- Fitzpatrick, G. (2016). Cannibalism and the war crimes trials. In G. Fitzpatrick, T. L. H. McCormack, & N. Morris (Eds.), Australia's war crimes trials 1945–51 (pp. 291–325). Brill. doi:10.1163/9789004292055_011
- Kushner, B. (1997). Cannibalizing Japanese media: The case of Issei Sagawa. The Journal of Popular Culture, 31(3), 55–68. doi:10.1111/j.0022-3840.1997.3103_55.x
- Sutton, D. S. (1995). Consuming counterrevolution: The ritual and culture of cannibalism in Wuxuan, Guangxi, China, May to July 1968. Comparative Studies in Society and History, 37(1), 136–172. doi:10.1017/s0010417500019575
- Tanaka, Y. (1996). Hidden horrors: Japanese war crimes in World War II ("Judge Webb and Japanese cannibalism"). Westview Press.
- Zheng, Y. (1996). Scarlet memorial: Tales of cannibalism in modern China (T. P. Sym, Ed. & Trans.). Westview Press. (Original work published 1993)
- Zhou, X. (Ed.). (2012). The great famine in China, 1958–1962: A documentary history (ch. 4, "Cannibalism (late 1959–early 1961)"). Yale University Press. doi:10.12987/9780300183580

=== Modern Europe and Russia ===
- Applebaum, A. (2017). Red famine: Stalin's war on Ukraine ("Starvation: Spring and summer, 1933"). Doubleday.
- Bertelsen, O. (2018). "Hyphenated" identities during the Holodomor: Women and cannibalism. In E. Bemporad & J. W. Warren (Eds.), Women and genocide: Survivors, victims, perpetrators (pp. 77–96). Indiana University Press. JSTOR j.ctvgd2jm.9
- Bidlack, R., & Lomagin, N. (2012). The Leningrad blockade, 1941–1944: A new documentary history from the Soviet archives (M. Schwartz, Trans.; ch. 4, "The struggle to survive", pp. 262–328). Yale University Press. doi:10.12987/9780300183306
- Ginzburg, C. (2012). Threads and traces: True, false, fictive (A. C. Tedeschi & J. Tedeschi, Trans.; ch. 3, "Montaigne, cannibals, and grottoes", pp. 34–53). University of California Press. doi:10.1525/9780520949843
- Gordon-Grube, K. (1988). Anthropophagy in post-Renaissance Europe: The tradition of medicinal cannibalism. American Anthropologist, 90(2), 405–409. doi:10.1525/aa.1988.90.2.02a00110
- Kudachinova, C. (2025). Scenes of starvation and survival cannibalism: Colonial food security and violence in seventeenth-century Siberia. Food and History, 23(1), 65–86. doi:10.1484/j.food.5.145074
- Patenaude, B. M. (2002). The big show in Bololand: The American relief expedition to Soviet Russia in the famine of 1921 (ch. 14, "Tales of cannibalism", pp. 262–270). Stanford University Press. doi:10.1515/9781503620063
- Werth, N. (2007). Cannibal Island: Death in a Siberian gulag (S. Rendall, Trans.). Princeton University Press. (Original work published 2006) doi:10.1515/9780691262529

=== Modern Pacific ===
- Anderson, W. (2008). The collectors of lost souls: Turning kuru scientists into whitemen. Johns Hopkins University Press. doi:10.56021/9781421433608
- Banivanua Mar, T. (2010). Cannibalism and colonialism: Charting colonies and frontiers in nineteenth-century Fiji. Comparative Studies in Society and History, 52(2), 255–281. doi:10.1017/s0010417510000046
- Brantlinger, P. (2011). Taming cannibals: Race and the Victorians (ch. 1, "Missionaries and cannibals in nineteenth-century Fiji", pp. 27–45). Cornell University Press. doi:10.7591/cornell/9780801450198.001.0001
- Collinge, J., Whitfield, J., McKintosh, E., Beck, J., Mead, S., Thomas, D. J., & Alpers, M. P. (2006). Kuru in the 21st century: An acquired human prion disease with very long incubation periods. The Lancet, 367(9528), 2068–2074. doi:10.1016/s0140-6736(06)68930-7
- Hoffman, C. (2014). Savage harvest: A tale of cannibals, colonialism, and Michael Rockefeller's tragic quest for primitive art. William Morrow.
- Jennings, W. (2011). The debate over kai tangata (Maori cannibalism): New perspectives from the correspondence of the Marists. The Journal of the Polynesian Society, 120(2), 129–147.
- Liberski, P. P., Sikorska, B., Lindenbaum, S., Goldfarb, L. G., McLean, C., Hainfellner, J. A., & Brown, P. (2012). Kuru: Genes, cannibals and neuropathology. Journal of Neuropathology & Experimental Neurology, 71(2), 92–103. doi:10.1097/nen.0b013e3182444efd
- Moon, P. (2008). This horrid practice: The myth and reality of traditional Maori cannibalism. Penguin Books.
- Obeyesekere, G. (2005). Cannibal talk: The man-eating myth and human sacrifice in the South Seas. University of California Press. doi:10.1525/9780520938311
- Sahlins, M. (2003). Artificially maintained controversies: Global warming and Fijian cannibalism. Anthropology Today, 19(3), 3–5. doi:10.1111/1467-8322.00189

=== Survival cannibalism ===
- Cavell, J. (2013). Publishing Sir John Franklin's fate: Cannibalism, journalism, and the 1881 edition of Leopold McClintock's The voyage of the "Fox" in the Arctic seas. Book History, 16(1), 155–184. doi:10.1353/bh.2013.0001
- Dixon, K. J., Novak, S. A., Robbins, G., Schablitsky, J. M., Scott, G. R., & Tasa, G. L. (2010). "Men, women, and children starving": Archaeology of the Donner family camp. American Antiquity, 75(3), 627–656. doi:10.7183/0002-7316.75.3.627
- Guttridge, L. F. (2000). Ghosts of Cape Sabine: The harrowing true story of the Greely Expedition. Putnam.
- Hanson, N. (2000). The custom of the sea. Wiley. (Original work published 1999)
- Herrmann, R. B. (2011). The "tragicall historie": Cannibalism and abundance in colonial Jamestown. The William and Mary Quarterly, 68(1), 47–74. doi:10.5309/willmaryquar.68.1.0047
- Hutchinson, A. C. (2010). Is eating people wrong? Great legal cases and how they shaped the world (ch. 2, "Is eating people wrong?", pp. 13–40). Cambridge University Press. doi:10.1017/cbo9780511782152
- Keenleyside, A., Bertulli, M., & Fricke, H. C. (1997). The final days of the Franklin expedition: New skeletal evidence. Arctic, 50(1), 36–46. doi:10.14430/arctic1089
- Kelso, W. M. (2017). Jamestown, the truth revealed ("Jane"). University of Virginia Press.
- Mays, S., & Beattie, O. (2016). Evidence for end-stage cannibalism on Sir John Franklin's last expedition to the Arctic, 1845. International Journal of Osteoarchaeology, 26(5), 778–786. doi:10.1002/oa.2479
- Philbrick, N. (2000). In the heart of the sea: The tragedy of the whaleship Essex (ch. 10, "The whisper of necessity"; ch. 11, "Games of chance"). Viking.
- Read, P. P. (1974). Alive: The story of the Andes survivors. Lippincott.
- Simpson, A. W. B. (1984). Cannibalism and the common law: The story of the tragic last voyage of the Mignonette and the strange legal proceedings to which it gave rise. University of Chicago Press.

== Human cannibalism in psychology ==
=== Criminal and forensic psychology ===
- Byard, R. W. (2023). Cannibalism—overview and medicolegal issues. Forensic Science, Medicine and Pathology, 19(2), 281–287. doi:10.1007/s12024-023-00623-4
- Petreca, V. G., Brucato, G., Burgess, A. W., & Dixon, E. (2021). Criminal cannibalism: An examination of patterns and styles. Aggression and Violent Behavior, 56, Article 101531. doi:10.1016/j.avb.2020.101531
- Raymond, S., Léger, A.-S., & Gasman, I. (2019). The psychopathological profile of cannibalism: A review of five cases. Journal of Forensic Sciences, 64(5), 1568–1573. doi:10.1111/1556-4029.14099
- Tithecott, R. (1997). Of men and monsters: Jeffrey Dahmer and the construction of the serial killer ("Jeffrey Dahmer: Gay, white cannibal", pp. 65–88). University of Wisconsin Press. JSTOR jj.36106019
- Zaman, B., & Soldz, S. (2017). Why cannibal? Representation and defense in the Meiwes "German cannibal" case. International Journal of Applied Psychoanalytic Studies, 14(1), 69–80. doi:10.1002/aps.1492

=== General psychology ===
- Lingam, R., & Mason, S. (2020). Self-cannibalism and cannibalism: A perverse defence against depression. The International Journal of Forensic Psychotherapy, 2(1), 42–51. doi:10.33212/ijfp.v2n1.2020.42
- Petrinovich, L. (2000). The cannibal within. De Gruyter.
- Sagan, E. (1974). Cannibalism: Human aggression and cultural form. Harper & Row.
- Vyrgioti, M. (2021a). Freud and the cannibal: Vignettes from psychoanalysis' colonial history. In S. Bar-Haim, E. Coles, & H. Tyson (Eds.), Wild analysis: From the couch to cultural and political life (pp. 67–81). Routledge. doi:10.4324/9781003200765-6
- Vyrgioti, M. (2021b). "The royal road to the colonial unconscious": Psychoanalysis, cannibalism, and the libidinal economy of colonialism. Das Questões, 11(1), 266–286.

=== Windigo psychosis ===
- Bishop, C. A. (1975). Northern Algonkian cannibalism and windigo psychosis. In T. R. Williams (Ed.), Psychological anthropology (pp. 237–248). Mouton. doi:10.1515/9783110802818.237
- Hay, T. H. (1971). The windigo psychosis: Psychodynamic, cultural, and social factors in aberrant behavior. American Anthropologist, 73(1), 1–19. doi:10.1525/aa.1971.73.1.02a00010
- Marano, L. (1982). Windigo psychosis: The anatomy of an emic-etic confusion. Current Anthropology, 23(4), 385–412. doi:10.1086/202868
- Parker, S. (1960). The wiitiko psychosis in the context of Ojibwa personality and culture. American Anthropologist, 62(4), 603–623. doi:10.1525/aa.1960.62.4.02a00050
- Teicher, M. I. (1960). Windigo psychosis: A study of a relationship between belief and behavior among the Indians of northeastern Canada. American Ethnological Society.
- Waldram, J. B. (2004). Revenge of the windigo: The construction of the mind and mental health of North American Aboriginal peoples (ch. 8, "The culture-bound Aboriginal", pp. 190–211). University of Toronto Press. doi:10.3138/9781442683815

== Human cannibalism in anthropology ==
=== General studies ===
- Brown, P., & Tuzin, D. (Eds.). (1983). The ethnography of cannibalism. Society for Psychological Anthropology.
- Forsberg, R. C. W. (2019). Toward a theory of peace: The role of moral beliefs (M. Evangelista & N. C. Crawford, Eds.; ch. 5, "Ritual cannibalism: A case study of socially sanctioned group violence", pp. 91–127). Cornell University Press. doi:10.7591/9781501744365
- Gillison, G. (2007). From cannibalism to genocide: The work of denial. The Journal of Interdisciplinary History, 37(3), 395–414. doi:10.1162/jinh.2007.37.3.395
- Goldman, L. R. (Ed.). (1999). The anthropology of cannibalism. Bergin & Garvey. doi:10.5040/9798400613333
- Himmelman, P. K. (1997). The medicinal body: An analysis of medicinal cannibalism in Europe, 1300–1700. Dialectical Anthropology, 22(2), 183–203. doi:10.1023/a:1006816817733
- Johnson, N. B. (1993). Cannibals and culture: The anthropology of Michel de Montaigne. Dialectical Anthropology, 18(2), 153–176. doi:10.1007/bf01297694
- Lindenbaum, S. (2004). Thinking about cannibalism. Annual Review of Anthropology, 33, 475–498. doi:10.1146/annurev.anthro.33.070203.143758
- Sanday, P. R. (1986). Divine hunger: Cannibalism as a cultural system. Cambridge University Press. doi:10.1017/cbo9780511607790
- Shankman, P. (1969). Le rôti et le bouilli: Lévi-Strauss' theory of cannibalism. American Anthropologist, 71(1), 54–69. doi:10.1525/aa.1969.71.1.02a00060

=== Africa and the Middle East ===
- Evans-Pritchard, E. E. (1960). Zande cannibalism. Journal of the Royal Anthropological Institute of Great Britain and Ireland, 90(2), 238–258. JSTOR 2844346
- Nyamnjoh, F. B. (Ed.). (2018). Eating and being eaten: Cannibalism as food for thought. Langaa RPCIG. JSTOR j.ctvh9vtgp
- Pottier, J. (2007). Rights violations, rumour, and rhetoric: Making sense of cannibalism in Mambasa, Ituri (Democratic Republic of Congo). Journal of the Royal Anthropological Institute, 13(4), 825–843. doi:10.1111/j.1467-9655.2007.00459.x
- Shaw, R. (2001). Cannibal transformations: Colonialism and commodification in the Sierra Leone hinterland. In H. L. Moore & T. Sanders (Eds.), Magical interpretations, material realities: Modernity, witchcraft and the occult in postcolonial Africa. Routledge. doi:10.4324/9780203398258-8

=== Mesoamerica ===
- Harner, M. (1977). The ecological basis for Aztec sacrifice. American Ethnologist, 4(1), 117–135. doi:10.1525/ae.1977.4.1.02a00070
- Harris, M. (1977). Cannibals and kings: The origins of cultures (ch. 9, "The cannibal kingdom", and ch. 10, "The lamb of mercy"). Random House.
- Ortiz de Montellano, B. R. (1978). Aztec cannibalism: An ecological necessity? Science, 200(4342), 611–617. doi:10.1126/science.200.4342.611
- Ortiz de Montellano, B. R. (1983). Counting skulls: Comment on the Aztec cannibalism theory of Harner-Harris. American Anthropologist, 85(2), 403–406. doi:10.1525/aa.1983.85.2.02a00130

=== North America ===
- Archer, C. I. (1980). Cannibalism in the early history of the Northwest Coast: Enduring myths and neglected realities. Canadian Historical Review, 61(4), 453–479. doi:10.3138/chr-061-04-01
- Brightman, R. A. (1988). The windigo in the material world. Ethnohistory, 35(4), 337. JSTOR 482140
- Gilmore, D. D. (2003). Monsters: Evil beings, mythical beasts, and all manner of imaginary terrors (ch. 5, "Windigo: Monster of the north", pp. 75–90). University of Pennsylvania Press. doi:10.9783/9780812203226
- Glass, A. (2021). Writing the Hamat'sa: Ethnography, colonialism, and the cannibal dance. UBC Press. doi:10.59962/9780774863797
- McDowell, J. (1997). Hamatsa: The enigma of cannibalism on the Pacific Northwest Coast. Ronsdale Press.
- Ridington, R. (1976). Wechuge and windigo: A comparison of cannibal belief among boreal forest Athapaskans and Algonkians. Anthropologica, 18(2), 107. JSTOR 25604963
- Wonderley, A. (2009). At the font of the marvelous: Exploring oral narrative and mythic imagery of the Iroquois and their neighbors ("The story of Windigo", pp. 69–97). Syracuse University Press. JSTOR j.ctt1j5d789

=== The Pacific World and East Asia ===
- Banivanua Mar, T. (2016). Performing cannibalism in the South Seas. In K. Alexeyeff & J. Taylor (Eds.), Touring Pacific cultures (pp. 323–332). ANU Press. doi:10.22459/tpc.12.2016.21
- Bowden, R. (1984). Maori cannibalism: An interpretation. Oceania, 55(2), 81–99. doi:10.1002/j.1834-4461.1984.tb02924.x
- DeBlock, H. (2018). Cannibals in paradise: The exotic, the familiar, and the strange in ritual and performance in Vanuatu. Journal of Anthropological Research, 74(4), 541–557. doi:10.1086/699944
- Dornstreich, M. D., & Morren, G. E. B. (1974). Does New Guinea cannibalism have nutritional value? Human Ecology, 2(1), 1–12. doi:10.1007/bf01507342
- Glasse, R. (1967). Cannibalism in the kuru region of New Guinea. Transactions of the New York Academy of Sciences, 29(6), 748–754. doi:10.1111/j.2164-0947.1967.tb02298.x
- Lindenbaum, S. (1979). Kuru sorcery: Disease and danger in the New Guinea highlands. Mayfield.
- Lindenbaum, S. (2008). Understanding kuru: The contribution of anthropology and medicine. Philosophical Transactions of the Royal Society B: Biological Sciences, 363(1510), 3715–3720. doi:10.1098/rstb.2008.0072
- Mathews, J. D., Glasse, R., & Lindenbaum, S. (1968). Kuru and cannibalism. The Lancet, 292(7565), 449–452. doi:10.1016/s0140-6736(68)90482-0
- Sahlins, M. (1983). Raw women, cooked men, and other "great things" of the Fiji Islands. In P. Brown & D. Tuzin (Eds.), The ethnography of cannibalism (pp. 72–93). Society for Psychological Anthropology.
- Steadman, L. (1975). Cannibal witches in the Hewa. Oceania, 46(2), 114–121. doi:10.1002/j.1834-4461.1975.tb01899.x
- Steadman, L. B., & Merbs, C. F. (1982). Kuru and cannibalism? American Anthropologist, 84(3), 611–627. doi:10.1525/aa.1982.84.3.02a00060
- Strathern, A. (1982). Witchcraft, greed, cannibalism and death: Some related themes from the New Guinea Highlands. In M. Bloch & J. Parry (Eds.), Death and the regeneration of life (pp. 111–133). Cambridge University Press. doi:10.1017/cbo9780511607646.005
- Thiessen, I. (2001). The social construction of gender: Female cannibalism in Papua New Guinea. Anthropos, 96(1), 141–156. JSTOR 40465458
- Whitfield, J. T., Pako, W. H., Collinge, J., & Alpers, M. P. (2008). Mortuary rites of the South Fore and kuru. Philosophical Transactions of the Royal Society B: Biological Sciences, 363(1510), 3721–3724. doi:10.1098/rstb.2008.0074

=== South America ===
- Conklin, B. A. (1995). "Thus are our bodies, thus was our custom": Mortuary cannibalism in an Amazonian society. American Ethnologist, 22(1), 75–101. doi:10.1525/ae.1995.22.1.02a00040
- Conklin, B. A. (1997). Consuming images: Representations of cannibalism on the Amazonian frontier. Anthropological Quarterly, 70(2), 68. JSTOR 3317507
- Conklin, B. A. (2001). Consuming grief: Compassionate cannibalism in an Amazonian society. University of Texas Press. doi:10.7560/712324
- Cormier, L. A. (2003). Animism, cannibalism, and pet-keeping among the Guajá of eastern Amazonia. Tipití: Journal of the Society for the Anthropology of Lowland South America, 1(1). doi:10.70845/2572-3626.1005
- Dole, G. (1962). Endocannibalism among the Amahuaca Indians. Transactions of the New York Academy of Sciences, 24(5), 567–573. doi:10.1111/j.2164-0947.1962.tb01432.x
- Fausto, C. (2007). Feasting on people: Eating animals and humans in Amazonia. Current Anthropology, 48(4), 497–530. doi:10.1086/518298
- Uzendoski, M. A. (2020). Cannibal conquerors and ancestors: The aesthetics of struggle in Indigenous Amazonian storytelling from Ecuador. Storytelling, Self, Society, 16(1), 61–79. doi:10.13110/storselfsoci.16.1.0061
- Vilaça, A. (2000). Relations between funerary cannibalism and warfare cannibalism: The question of predation. Ethnos, 65(1), 83–106. doi:10.1080/001418400360652
- Viveiros de Castro, E. (1992). From the enemy's point of view: Humanity and divinity in an Amazonian society (C. V. Howard, Trans.). University of Chicago Press. (Original work published 1986) doi:10.7208/chicago/9780226768830.001.0001

== Human cannibalism in religion ==
=== Christianity ===
- Belcher, W. L. (2019). Mary saves the man-eater: Value in the medieval Ethiopian Marian miracle tale of "The cannibal of Qəmər". Digital Philology: A Journal of Medieval Cultures, 8(1), 29–49. doi:10.1353/dph.2019.0013
- Cevasco, C. (2016). This is my body: Communion and cannibalism in colonial New England and New France. The New England Quarterly, 89(4), 556–586. doi:10.1162/tneq_a_00564
- Fricke, B. (2011). Jesus wept! On the history of anthropophagy in Christianity: A new reading of a miniature from the Gospel book of Otto III as Kippfigur. Res: Anthropology and Aesthetics, 59–60, 192–205. doi:10.1086/resvn1ms23647790
- Hancock, B. (2014). The scandal of sacramentality: The Eucharist in literary and theological perspective ("Consuming: Cannibalism and sacrament", pp. 121–149). James Clarke. JSTOR j.ctt1cgf2fr
- McGowan, A. (1994). Eating people: Accusations of cannibalism against Christians in the second century. Journal of Early Christian Studies, 2(4), 413–442. doi:10.1353/earl.0.0202
- Moss, C. R. (2021). Infant exposure and the rhetoric of cannibalism, incest, and martyrdom in the early church. Journal of Early Christian Studies, 29(3), 341–369. doi:10.1353/earl.2021.0023
- Pan, L. (2022). Cannibalism and the Eucharist: The ethics of eating the human and the divine. Sophia, 61(4), 869–885. doi:10.1007/s11841-022-00928-x

=== Judaism and Islam ===
- Alleson-Gerberg, S. A. (2019). The Sabbatian who devoured his son: Jacob Emden's anti-Sabbatian polemics of cannibalism. AJS Review, 43(1), 23–46. doi:10.1353/ajs.2019.0006
- Bashir, S. (2006). Shah Ismaʿil and the Qizilbash: Cannibalism in the religious history of early Safavid Iran. History of Religions, 45(3), 234–256. doi:10.1086/503715
- Bemporad, E. (2017). The blood libel and its war time permutations: Cannibalism in Soviet Lviv. In E. M. Avrutin, J. Dekel-Chen, & R. Weinberg (Eds.), Ritual murder in Russia, Eastern Europe, and beyond: New histories of an old accusation (pp. 219–237). Indiana University Press. JSTOR j.ctt2005rwx.17
- Çiğdem, R. (2011). Cannibalism as highlighted by a case from the Ottoman law court of Sofia, 1027/1618. Acta Orientalia Academiae Scientiarum Hungaricae, 64(3), 287–303. doi:10.1556/aorient.64.2011.3.3
- Graybill, R. (2022). A child is being eaten: Maternal cannibalism and the Hebrew Bible in the company of fairy tales. Journal of Biblical Literature, 141(2), 235–255. doi:10.15699/jbl.141.2.2022.3
- Langmuir, G. I. (1990). Toward a definition of antisemitism (ch. 11, "Ritual cannibalism"). University of California Press.
- Lanner, L. (1999). Cannibal mothers and me: A mother's reading of 2 Kings 6.24–7.20. Journal for the Study of the Old Testament, 24(85), 107–116. doi:10.1177/030908929902408506
- Lasine, S. (1991). Jehoram and the cannibal mothers (2 Kings 6.24–33): Solomon's judgment in an inverted world. Journal for the Study of the Old Testament, 16(50), 27–53. doi:10.1177/030908929101605003
- Lee, D. (2025). The inviolability and value of the human body and the corpse in the Islamic legal tradition. Body and Religion, 7(1), 53–85. doi:10.1558/bar.28948
- Matthews, V. H. (2013). Taking calculated risks: The story of the cannibal mothers (2 Kings 6:24–7:20). Biblical Theology Bulletin, 43(1), 4–13. doi:10.1177/0146107912470331
- Williams Boyarin, A. (2020). The Christian Jew and the unmarked Jewess: The polemics of sameness in medieval English anti-Judaism (ch. 4, "Mothers and cannibals", pp. 146–183). University of Pennsylvania Press. doi:10.9783/9780812297508

=== Witchcraft and magic ===
- Behrend, H. (2011). Resurrecting cannibals: The Catholic Church, witch-hunts and the production of pagans in western Uganda. Boydell & Brewer. doi:10.1515/9781846159961
- Maraschi, A., & Tasca, F. (2024). Food, heresies, and magical boundaries in the Middle Ages (ch. 7, "Cannibalism and natural magic: Human flesh as a gate to the hidden powers of nature in the Picatrix", pp. 189–220). Amsterdam University Press. JSTOR jj.18108220
- Roper, L. (2004). Witch craze: Terror and fantasy in Baroque Germany (ch. 3, "Cannibalism", pp. 69–81). Yale University Press. doi:10.12987/9780300176520
- Wilby, E. (2013). Burchard's strigae, the witches' sabbath, and shamanistic cannibalism in early modern Europe. Magic, Ritual, and Witchcraft, 8(1), 18–49. doi:10.1353/mrw.2013.0010
- Zika, C. (2003). Exorcising our demons: Magic, witchcraft and visual culture in early modern Europe ("Cannibalism and witchcraft in early modern Europe: Reading the visual images", pp. 445–479). Brill. doi:10.1163/9789004475915

=== Other religious traditions ===
- Barrett, R. (2008). Aghor medicine: Pollution, death, and healing in northern India (ch. 6, "Death and nondiscrimination", pp. 138–166). University of California Press. doi:10.1525/9780520941014
- Brundage, B. C. (1979). The fifth sun: Aztec gods, Aztec world (ch. 9, "The nuclear cult: War, sacrifice, and cannibalism", pp. 195–219). University of Texas Press. doi:10.7560/724273
- Burhenn, H. (2004). Understanding Aztec cannibalism. Archive for the Psychology of Religion, 26(1), 1–14. doi:10.1163/0084672053598003
- DeSanti, B. (2015). The cannibal talking head: The portrayal of the windigo "monster" in popular culture and Ojibwe traditions. The Journal of Religion and Popular Culture, 27(3), 186–201. doi:10.3138/jrpc.27.3.2938
- McLuckie, A. (2008). Reinterpreting the Kwakiutl Hamatsa dance as an expression of the Apollonian and Dionysian synthesis. Religious Studies and Theology, 26(2), 149–171. doi:10.1558/rsth.v26i2.149
- Ohnuma, R. (2007). Head, eyes, flesh, and blood: Giving away the body in Indian Buddhist literature (ch. 6, "Bodies ordinary and ideal", pp. 199–241). Columbia University Press. doi:10.7312/ohnu13708
- Parry, J. (1982). Sacrificial death and the necrophagous ascetic. In M. Bloch & J. Parry (Eds.), Death and the regeneration of life (pp. 74–110). Cambridge University Press. doi:10.1017/cbo9780511607646.004
- Parry, J. P. (1994). Death in Banaras (ch. 8, "Asceticism and the conquest of death"). Cambridge University Press.
- Tralau, J. (2017). Cannibalism, vegetarianism, and the community of sacrifice: Rediscovering Euripides' Cretans and the beginnings of political philosophy. Classical Philology, 112(4), 435–455. doi:10.1086/694569
- Yu, J. (2012). Sanctity and self-inflicted violence in Chinese religions, 1500–1700 ("Nourishing the parent with one's own flesh", pp. 62–88). Oxford University Press. doi:10.1093/acprof:oso/9780199844906.001.0001

== Human cannibalism in literature ==
=== General literature ===
- Brown, J. (2013). Cannibalism in literature and film. Palgrave Macmillan. doi:10.1057/9781137292124
- Guest, K. (Ed.). (2001). Eating their words: Cannibalism and the boundaries of cultural identity. State University of New York Press. JSTOR jj.18253076
- Hernández Gutiérrez, J. M. (2019). Traveling anthropophagy: The depiction of cannibalism in modern travel writing, sixteenth to nineteenth centuries. Journal of World History, 30(3), 393–414. doi:10.1353/jwh.2019.0060
- Kaplanoglou, M. (2016). Spinning and cannibalism in the Greek 'Cinderella': Symbolic analogies in folktale and myth. Folklore, 127(1), 1–25. doi:10.1080/0015587x.2015.1093821
- Lyons, P. (1995). From man-eaters to Spam-eaters: Literary tourism and the discourse of cannibalism from Herman Melville to Paul Theroux. Arizona Quarterly, 51(2), 33–62. doi:10.1353/arq.1995.0016

=== Classical and medieval ===
- Anderson, W. S. (1987). Juvenal Satire 15: Cannibals and culture. Ramus, 16(1–2), 203–214. doi:10.1017/s0048671x00003325
- Blurton, H. (2007). Cannibalism in high medieval English literature. Palgrave Macmillan. doi:10.1007/978-1-137-11579-9
- Cueva, E. P. (2021). Cannibalism and the ancient novel revisited. In G. Champion (Ed.), Interdisciplinary essays on cannibalism (pp. 67–82). Routledge. doi:10.4324/9781003002154-8
- Godlove, S. N. (2009). Bodies as borders: Cannibalism and conversion in the Old English Andreas. Studies in Philology, 106(2), 137–160. doi:10.1353/sip.0.0021
- Heng, G. (2000). The romance of England: Richard Coer de Lyon, Saracens, Jews, and the politics of race and nation. In J. J. Cohen (Ed.), The postcolonial Middle Ages (pp. 135–171). Palgrave Macmillan. doi:10.1057/9780230107342_9
- Hostetter, A. (2017). Political appetites: Food in medieval English romance ("Andreas: Cannibals at the edge of history", pp. 32–65). Ohio State University Press. JSTOR j.ctv174t7fr
- Luo, M. (2023). Animality, humanity, and divine power: Exploring implicit cannibalism in medieval weretiger stories. Early Medieval China, 29, 64–86. doi:10.1080/15299104.2023.2240136
- Mann, R. (2023). Traces of survival cannibalism in Homer's Odyssey. Classical Journal, 118(4), 379–408. doi:10.1353/tcj.2023.0009
- Maraschi, A. (2020). Taboo or magic practice? Cannibalism as identity marker for giants and human heroes in medieval Iceland. Parergon, 37(1), 1–25. doi:10.1353/pgn.2020.0056
- McDonald, N. (2004). Eating people and the alimentary logic of Richard Cœur de Lion. In N. McDonald (Ed.), Pulp fictions of medieval England: Essays in popular romance (pp. 124–143). Manchester University Press. doi:10.7228/manchester/9780719063183.003.0007
- Parker, L. P. (2025). Light of the everlasting life: Disability and crip eschatology in Old English literature (ch. 4, "St. Andrew's blood: Cannibalism, torture, and conversion", pp. 145–176). University of Michigan Press. doi:10.3998/mpub.12571891
- Reider, N. T. (2021). Mountain witches: Yamauba (ch. 1, "Man-eating, helping, shape-shifting yamauba: Yamauba's duality", pp. 23–52). Utah State University Press. doi:10.7330/9781646420551

=== Early modern ===
- Boutcher, W. (2016). Butchering the cannibals: Essais I.31 dismembered for Florio's modern readers. In N. Kenny, R. Scholar, & W. Williams (Eds.), Montaigne in transit: Essays in honour of Ian Maclean (pp. 107–132). Legenda. JSTOR j.ctv16km0rb.12
- Connolly, S. R. (2020). Equity and Amerindians in Montaigne's "Des cannibales" (1, 31). Renaissance and Reformation, 43(3), 195–228. doi:10.33137/rr.v43i3.35306
- Davis Perry, L. A. (2019). Satirizing the blood libel: Ritual cannibalism, infant sacrifice, and bloodied knives in "A modest proposal". Rocky Mountain Review, 73(2), 119–141. doi:10.1353/rmr.2019.0028
- Desan, P. (2017). Montaigne: A life (S. Rendall & L. Neal, Trans.; ch. 4, "'Witness my cannibals': The encounter with the Indians of the New World", pp. 155–182). Princeton University Press. doi:10.1515/9781400883394
- Ellis, M. (1996). Crusoe, cannibalism and empire. In L. Spaas & B. Stimpson (Eds.), Robinson Crusoe: Myths and metamorphoses (pp. 45–61). Macmillan Press. doi:10.1007/978-1-349-13677-3_4
- Flynn, C. H. (1990). The body in Swift and Defoe ("Consumptive fictions: Cannibalism in Defoe and Swift", pp. 149–176). Cambridge University Press. doi:10.1017/cbo9780511553462
- Go, K. (2012). Montaigne's "Cannibals" and The Tempest revisited. Studies in Philology, 109(4), 455–473. doi:10.1353/sip.2012.0026
- Guild, E. (2014). Unsettling Montaigne: Poetics, ethics and affect in the Essais and other writings (ch. 2, "'Je ne vois le tout de rien': The cannibal and the place of knowledge", pp. 40–72). D. S. Brewer. doi:10.1515/9781782042457
- Jooma, M. (1997). Robinson Crusoe Inc(orporates): Domestic economy, incest and the trope of cannibalism. LIT: Literature Interpretation Theory, 8(1), 61–81. doi:10.1080/10436929708580191
- Juall, S. D. (2008). "Beaucoup plus barbares que les Sauvages mesmes": Cannibalism, savagery, and religious alterity in Jean de Léry's Histoire d'un voyage faict en la terre du Brésil (1599–1600). L'Esprit Créateur, 48(1), 58–71. doi:10.1353/esp.2008.0003
- Klarer, M. (1999). Cannibalism and carnivalesque: Incorporation as utopia in the early image of America. New Literary History, 30(2), 389–410. doi:10.1353/nlh.1999.0025
- Lu, T. (2008). Accidental incest, filial cannibalism, and other peculiar encounters in late imperial Chinese literature ("The arithmetic of filial piety", pp. 135–174). Harvard University Asia Center. doi:10.1163/9781684174775
- Noble, L. (2011). Medicinal cannibalism in early modern English literature and culture. Palgrave Macmillan. doi:10.1057/9780230118614
- Noble, L. C. (2003). "And make two pasties of your shameful heads": Medicinal cannibalism and healing the body politic in Titus Andronicus. ELH, 70(3), 677–708. doi:10.1353/elh.2003.0029
- Pearlman, E. (1976). Robinson Crusoe and the cannibals. Mosaic, 10(1), 39–55. JSTOR 24778878
- Rawson, C. (2001). God, Gulliver, and genocide: Barbarism and the European imagination, 1492–1945 ("Indians and Irish from Montaigne to Swift", pp. 17–91; "Killing the poor: An Anglo-Irish theme?", pp. 183–255). Oxford University Press. doi:10.1093/oso/9780198184256.001.0001
- Rice, R. J. (2004). Cannibalism and the act of revenge in Tudor-Stuart drama. SEL: Studies in English Literature 1500–1900, 44(2), 297–316. doi:10.1353/sel.2004.0020
- Schmidgen, W. (2002). Eighteenth-century fiction and the law of property ("Terra nullius, cannibalism, and the natural law of appropriation in Robinson Crusoe", pp. 32–62). Cambridge University Press. doi:10.1017/cbo9780511484483
- Shahani, G. G. (2020). Tasting difference: Food, race, and cultural encounters in early modern literature (ch. 5, "Cannibal foods: 'Powdered wife' and other tales of English cannibalism", pp. 135–162). Cornell University Press. doi:10.7591/9781501748721
- Sibau, M. F. (2018). Filiality, cannibalism, sanctity: Fleshing out gegu in a late Ming tale of a filial girl. Chinese Literature: Essays, Articles, Reviews, 40, 51–72. JSTOR 26795666
- Sugg, R. (2007). Murder after death: Literature and anatomy in early modern England (ch. 2, "'I'll eat the rest of th'anatomy': Dissection and cannibalism", pp. 36–86). Cornell University Press. doi:10.7591/9781501729973
- Welch, A. (2015). Anthropology and anthropophagy in The Faerie Queene. Spenser Studies, 30, 167–192. doi:10.7756/spst.030.011.167-92

=== Nineteenth century ===
- Crain, C. (1994). Lovers of human flesh: Homosexuality and cannibalism in Melville's novels. American Literature, 66(1), 25–53. JSTOR 2927432
- Gasperini, A. (2019). Nineteenth century popular fiction, medicine and anatomy: The Victorian penny blood and the 1832 Anatomy Act ("Underground truths: Sweeney Todd, cannibalism, and discourse control", pp. 129–177). Springer International Publishing. doi:10.1007/978-3-030-10916-5
- Hibbard, A. (2019). Cannibalism and the late-Victorian adventure novel: The Queen v. Dudley and Stephens. English Literature in Transition, 1880–1920, 62(3), 305–327.
- Hughes, H. (2004). Fish, sex and cannibalism: Appetites for conversion in Melville's Typee. Leviathan, 6(2), 3–16. doi:10.1111/j.1750-1849.2004.tb00090.x
- Hurm, G., & Davis, A. B. (1998). At the margins of taste and the center of modernity: Mark Twain's "Cannibalism in the cars". New Literary History, 29(1), 47–65. doi:10.1353/nlh.1998.0005
- Kitson, P. J. (2000). "The Eucharist of hell"; or, eating people is right: Romantic representations of cannibalism. Romanticism on the Net, (17). doi:10.7202/005892ar
- Leonardi, B. (2019). Hunger and cannibalism: James Hogg's deconstruction of Scottish military masculinities in The three perils of man or war, women, and witchcraft! In M. Brown, A. M. Barry, & J. Begiato (Eds.), Martial masculinities: Experiencing and imagining the military in the long nineteenth century (pp. 139–160). Manchester University Press. doi:10.7765/9781526135636.00014
- Marlow, J. E. (1983). English cannibalism: Dickens after 1859. Studies in English Literature, 1500–1900, 23(4), 647. JSTOR 450268
- Sanborn, G. (1998). The sign of the cannibal: Melville and the making of a postcolonial reader. Duke University Press.
- Titlestad, M. (2021). The cannibals and the butterfly: The wreck of the Medusa (1816). In Shipwreck narratives: Out of our depth (pp. 61–74). Springer International Publishing. doi:10.1007/978-3-030-87041-6_6
- Voeller, C. R. (2009). "A man is a fool who prefers poor California beef to human flesh": (Re)definitions of masculinity in nineteenth-century US Donner Party literature. Western American Literature, 44(3), 200–223. doi:10.1353/wal.0.0045

=== Twentieth to the present ===
- Aoyama, T. (2008). Reading food in modern Japanese literature ("Cannibalism in modern Japanese literature", pp. 94–130). University of Hawai'i Press. doi:10.21313/hawaii/9780824832858.001.0001
- Barletta, V., & Gupta-Rastogi, A. (2024). Oswald de Andrade and the cannibalist science of others' blood. Hispania, 107(4), 425–435. doi:10.1353/hpn.2024.a948367
- Berglund, J. (1999). Write, right, white, rite: Literacy, imperialism, race, and cannibalism in Edgar Rice Burroughs' Tarzan of the apes. Studies in American Fiction, 27(1), 53–76. doi:10.1353/saf.1999.0011
- Burkhart, D. (2006). Archeology of female cannibalism: Slavenka Drakulić's novel Divine hunger. Russian Literature, 59(1), 1–24. doi:10.1016/j.ruslit.2006.01.001
- Dominy, J. J. (2015). Cannibalism, consumerism, and profanation. The Cormac McCarthy Journal, 13(1), 143–158. doi:10.5325/cormmccaj.13.1.0143
- Duneer, A. (2022). Jack London and the sea ("The specter of survival cannibalism", pp. 91–118). University of Alabama Press. JSTOR jj.30297383
- Estes, A. (2017). Cannibalism and other transgressions of the human in The road. European Journal of American Studies, 12(3). doi:10.4000/ejas.12368
- Huebert, D. (2017). Eating and mourning the corpse of the world: Ecological cannibalism and elegiac protomourning in Cormac McCarthy's The road. The Cormac McCarthy Journal, 15(1), 66–87. doi:10.5325/cormmccaj.15.1.0066
- Kil, H. R. (2021). Cannibalism in Joyce and Mo Yan: Famine memory in Ulysses, The republic of wine, and Frog. Mosaic, 54(1), 75–91. doi:10.1353/mos.2021.0005
- Kucała, B. (2019). "I am rather strong on voyages and cannibalism": The other Dickens and other Victorians in Richard Flanagan's Wanting. Prague Journal of English Studies, 8(1), 161–177. doi:10.2478/pjes-2019-0009
- Leishman, D. (2008). Reason, justice, cannibalism: Utopian themes in the fiction of James Meek. Études écossaises, 11, 127–142. doi:10.4000/etudesecossaises.79
- Madureira, L. (2005). Cannibal modernities: Postcoloniality and the avant-garde in Caribbean and Brazilian literature. University of Virginia Press.
- Rojas, C. (2011). Of canons and cannibalism: A psycho-immunological reading of "Diary of a madman". Modern Chinese Literature and Culture, 23(1), 47–76. JSTOR 41491040
- Salmons, K. (2017). Food in the novels of Joseph Conrad ("Cannibalism and 'Falk: A reminiscence'", pp. 67–81). Springer International Publishing. doi:10.1007/978-3-319-56623-8
- Sceats, S. (2000). Food, consumption and the body in contemporary women's fiction ("Cannibalism and Carter: Fantasies of omnipotence", pp. 33–60). Cambridge University Press. doi:10.1017/cbo9780511485381
- Schreiber, H. E. (2014). Cannibalized evidence: The problem of over-incorporation in Zheng Yi's Scarlet Memorial. The Comparatist, 38(1), 70–82. doi:10.1353/com.2014.0019
- Thorn, M. (2015). Cannibalism, communion, and multifaith sacrifice in the novel and film Life of Pi. The Journal of Religion and Popular Culture, 27(1), 1–15. doi:10.3138/jrpc.27.1.2171
- Trefzer, A. (2011). Disturbing Indians: The archaeology of southern fiction ("Colonialism and cannibalism: Andrew Lytle's conquest narratives", pp. 31–64). University of Alabama Press. JSTOR jj.30297268
- Yue, G. (1999). The mouth that begs: Hunger, cannibalism, and the politics of eating in modern China ("Lu Xun and cannibalism", pp. 67–100; "From cannibalism to carnivorism", pp. 262–287). Duke University Press. doi:10.1215/9780822398516

== Human cannibalism in art and film ==
=== Visual art ===
- Bucher, B. (1981). Icon and conquest: A structural analysis of the illustrations of de Bry's Great Voyages (B. M. Gulati, Trans.). University of Chicago Press. (Original work published 1977)
- Davies, S. (2016). Renaissance ethnography and the invention of the human: New worlds, maps and monsters ("Spit-roasts, barbecues and the invention of the Brazilian cannibal", pp. 65–108). Cambridge University Press. doi:10.1017/cbo9781139568128

=== Film and popular culture ===
- Anderson, D. L. (2013). How the horror film broke its promise: Hyperreal horror and Ruggero Deodato's Cannibal holocaust. Horror Studies, 4(1), 109–125. doi:10.1386/host.4.1.109_1
- Powers, K. (2020). Hannibal Lecter as avenging war orphan in Thomas Harris's Hannibal rising. Twentieth-Century Literature, 66(1), 125–146. doi:10.1215/0041462x-8196740
- Waddell, C. (2016). Cannibal holocaust. Liverpool University Press. doi:10.3828/liverpool/9781911325116.001.0001

=== Documentary films ===
- Arijón, G. (Director). (2007). Stranded: I've come from a plane that crashed on the mountains [Film]. Zeitgeist Films.
- Berlinger, J. (Director). (2022). Conversations with a killer: The Jeffrey Dahmer tapes [TV series]. Netflix.
- Burns, R. (Director). (1992). The Donner Party [Film]. PBS.
- Bygott, R. (Director). (2010). Kuru: The science and the sorcery [Film]. Siamese.
- Fullerton-Smith, J. (Director). (1993). Alive: 20 years later [Film]. Touchstone Home Video.
- O'Rourke, D. (Director). (1988). Cannibal tours [Film].
- Paravel, V., & Castaing-Taylor, L. (Directors). (2017). Caniba [Film]. Norte Productions; Sensory Ethnography Lab.
- Shapiro, D., & Shapiro, L. G. (Directors). (2000). Keep the river on your right: A modern cannibal tale [Film].
- Walker, J. (Director). (2008). Passage [Film]. National Film Board of Canada.

== Biographies ==
- Collins, P. (2002). Hell's gates: The terrible journey of Alexander Pearce, Van Diemen's Land cannibal. Hardie Grant Books.
- Gantt, P. H. (1952). The case of Alfred Packer, the man-eater. University of Denver Press.
- Lourie, R. (1993). Hunting the devil: The pursuit, capture, and confession of the most savage serial killer in history. HarperCollins.
- Schechter, H. (2015). Man-eater: The life and legend of an American cannibal. Little A.
- Thorp, R. W., & Bunker, R. (1958). Crow killer: The saga of Liver-Eating Johnson. Indiana University Press.
- Worthington, M. (1966). The strange world of Willie Seabrook. Harcourt, Brace & World.

== Historiography and memory ==
=== Historiographical debates ===
- Brady, I. (1982). The myth-eating man. American Anthropologist, 84(3), 595–611. doi:10.1525/aa.1982.84.3.02a00050
- Obeyesekere, G. (1992). "British cannibals": Contemplation of an event in the death and resurrection of James Cook, explorer. Critical Inquiry, 18(4), 630–654. doi:10.1086/448650
- Rojas, C. (2002). Cannibalism and the Chinese body politic: Hermeneutics and violence in cross-cultural perception. Postmodern Culture, 12(3). doi:10.1353/pmc.2002.0025
- Villa, P. (1992). Cannibalism in prehistoric Europe. Evolutionary Anthropology: Issues, News, and Reviews, 1(3), 93–104. doi:10.1002/evan.1360010307

=== Memory and legend ===
- Gammon, J. (2019). Retelling the legend of Sawney Bean: Cannibalism in eighteenth-century England. In R. B. Herrmann (Ed.), To feast on us as their prey: Cannibalism and the early modern Atlantic (pp. 135–152). University of Arkansas Press. JSTOR j.ctv8jp0cn.12
- Hobbs, S., & Cornwell, D. (1997). Sawney Bean, the Scottish cannibal. Folklore, 108(1–2), 49–54. doi:10.1080/0015587x.1997.9715936
- Kirschenbaum, L. A. (2006). The legacy of the siege of Leningrad, 1941–1995: Myth, memories, and monuments ("Speaking the unspoken?", pp. 231–263). Cambridge University Press. doi:10.1017/cbo9780511511882
- Rossano, M. J. (2013). Mortal rituals: What the story of the Andes survivors tells us about human evolution. Columbia University Press. doi:10.7312/ross16500

== Primary sources ==
=== Accounts from Africa ===
- Du Chaillu, P. B. (1862). Explorations and adventures in equatorial Africa; with accounts of the manners and customs of the people, and of the chase of the gorilla, the crocodile, leopard, elephant, hippopotamus, and other animals (chs. 7–8). Harper & Brothers.
- Schweinfurth, G. (1874). The heart of Africa: Three years' travels and adventures in the unexplored regions of Central Africa from 1868 to 1871 (E. E. Frewer, Trans.; Vol. 2, ch. 13, "The Niam-niam"; ch. 15, "The Monbuttoo"). Harper & Brothers. (Original work published 1874)

=== Accounts from the Americas ===
- Bry, T. de. (1592). Americae tertia pars (H. Staden & J. de Léry, Texts). Theodor de Bry.
- Jane, C. (Ed. & Trans.). (1988). The four voyages of Columbus: A history in eight documents, including five by Christopher Columbus, in the original Spanish, with English translations ("Letter written by Dr. Diego Alvarez Chanca"). Dover Publications. (Original work published 1930–1933)
- Léry, J. de. (1990). History of a voyage to the land of Brazil, otherwise called America (J. Whatley, Trans.). University of California Press. (Original work published 1578) doi:10.1525/9780520913806
- Montaigne, M. de. (2004). Essays of Michel de Montaigne (C. Cotton, Trans.; W. C. Hazlitt, Ed.; bk. 1, ch. 30, "Of cannibals"). Project Gutenberg. (Original work published 1580)
- Schneebaum, T. (1969). Keep the river on your right. Grove Press.
- Staden, H. (2008). Hans Staden's true history: An account of cannibal captivity in Brazil (N. L. Whitehead & M. Harbsmeier, Trans.). Duke University Press. (Original work published 1557) doi:10.1215/9780822389293

=== Accounts from Asia ===
- Polo, M. (1903). The book of Ser Marco Polo the Venetian, concerning the kingdoms and marvels of the East (H. Yule, Ed. & Trans.; H. Cordier, Rev.; 3rd ed., Vol. 2; bk. 3, ch. 4, "Concerning the fashion of the idols"; ch. 9, "Concerning the island of Java the Less. The kingdoms of Ferlec and Basma"; ch. 10, "The kingdoms of Samara and Dagroian"). John Murray.

=== European chronicles ===
- Glaber, R. (1989). Rodulfi Glabri Historiarum libri quinque: The five books of the histories (J. France, Ed. & Trans.; bk. 4, ch. 4). Clarendon Press. doi:10.1093/actrade/9780198222415.book.1

=== Pacific accounts ===
- Berndt, R. M. (1962). Excess and restraint: Social control among a New Guinea mountain people. University of Chicago Press.
- Cook, J. (1777). A voyage towards the South Pole, and round the world (Vol. 1; bk. 2, ch. 5, "Transactions at Queen Charlotte's Sound; with an account of the inhabitants being cannibals"). W. Strahan & T. Cadell.
- Maretu. (1983). Cannibals and converts: Radical change in the Cook Islands. Institute of Pacific Studies, University of the South Pacific.
- Wallis, M. D. (1851). Life in Feejee. W. Heath.

=== Survival accounts ===
- Canessa, R., & Vierci, P. (2016). I had to survive: How a plane crash in the Andes inspired my calling to save lives (C. Frías, Trans.). Atria Books.
- Chase, O. (1821). Narrative of the most extraordinary and distressing shipwreck of the whale-ship Essex, of Nantucket. W. B. Gilley.
- Patrick Breen diary, 1846–1847 (BANC MSS C-E 176). Bancroft Library, University of California, Berkeley.
- Johnson, K. (Ed.). (1996). Unfortunate emigrants: Narratives of the Donner Party. Utah State University Press. doi:10.7330/9780874213133
- McGlashan, C. F. (1907). History of the Donner party: A tragedy of the Sierra. H. S. Crocker. (Original work published 1880)
- Parrado, N., & Rause, V. (2006). Miracle in the Andes: 72 days on the mountain and my long trek home. Crown Publishers.
- R v Dudley and Stephens (1884) 14 QBD 273.

=== Modernist manifestos ===
- Andrade, O. de. (1991). Cannibalist manifesto (L. Bary, Trans.). Latin American Literary Review, 19(38), 38–47. (Original work published 1928) JSTOR 20119601

== Reference works ==
Encyclopedia entries on human cannibalism.

- Lindenbaum, S. (2015). Cannibalism. In J. D. Wright (Ed.), International encyclopedia of the social & behavioral sciences (2nd ed., pp. 83–89). Elsevier. doi:10.1016/b978-0-08-097086-8.12236-6
- Lindenbaum, S. (2021). Cannibalism. Cambridge Encyclopedia of Anthropology. doi:10.29164/21cannibalism
- Reid, B. A. (2014). Cannibalism (anthropophagy). In B. A. Reid & R. G. Gilmore (Eds.), Encyclopedia of Caribbean archaeology (pp. 85–88). University Press of Florida. JSTOR j.ctvx1hst1.38
- White, L. (2021). Cannibalism. In V. Y. Mudimbe & K. Kavwahirehi (Eds.), Encyclopedia of African religions and philosophy (pp. 106–107). Springer. doi:10.1007/978-94-024-2068-5_69
- Wisnewski, J. J. (2019). Cannibalism. In D. M. Kaplan (Ed.), Encyclopedia of food and agricultural ethics (pp. 355–361). Springer. doi:10.1007/978-94-024-1179-9_28

== See also ==
- Cannibalism in Africa
- Cannibalism in Asia
- Cannibalism in Europe
- Cannibalism in Oceania
- Cannibalism in popular culture
- Cannibalism in the Americas
