= Intent to Destroy =

2017 documentary film

- Directed by: Joe Berlinger
- Written by: Joe Berlinger; Cy Christiansen
- Produced by: Joe Berlinger; Eric Esrailian; Chip Rosenbloom
- Music by: Serj Tankian
- Distributed by: Abramorama
- Release date: 2017
- Country: United States
- Language: English

Intent to Destroy: Death, Denial, & Depiction is a 2017 documentary film directed by Joe Berlinger about the Armenian genocide.

== Production ==
Berlinger embedded in the filming crew of The Promise to shoot Intent to Destroy. The film prominently features behind the scenes footage from The Promise, starring Oscar Isaac and Christian Bale, while incorporating historical context for the feature film.

According to The Promise actor Daniel Giménez-Cacho, an ambassador in the Turkish foreign service had contacted him and told him the Turkish government's position that the killings in the Armenian genocide were not a genocide; his statements were featured in Intent to Destroy.

Berlinger declined an invitation to travel to Ankara, Turkey to interview officials of the Turkish government. The interview request appeared after, according to him, he requested feedback from the Turkish government. Turkish officials did not say who he would meet, and had he gone, he would not have been allowed to bring his film crew nor any recording devices. Berlinger stated "I felt like it would be a useless trip and one that was potentially dangerous, frankly."

Among the experts interviewed were Taner Akçam, Fatma Müge Göçek, and Vicken Cheterian. The film also interviewed Turkish officials who denied that an Armenian Genocide had occurred.

== Reception ==
Los Angeles Times described the film as a "masterful effort." It earned a "Critic Score" of 92% on Rotten Tomatoes.

Frank Scheck of The Hollywood Reporter stated that it was "excellent and informative", though he argued that at times the film "plays like a special feature for the DVD edition of The Promise", an aspect he was critical of.

Historian Ronald Grigor Suny compared the film favorably to The Promise, stating, "Berlinger selects from The Promise precisely those scenes that show the horrors of 1915... Watching the crew paint the extras with simulated blood and the reaction of the lead actors to the scene (some of whom break down and sob) is oddly more evocative of the terrors of that time than that same scene" in The Promise. He also praised the film for its use of varied source material and expressed that film may be a better medium for capturing the horrors of genocide than written text, stating, "What on the printed page can possibly match the panoramic view, shot from above by a camera mounted on a drone, of a column of desperate, bereft Armenians marching to their death?"

== Release ==
After its theatrical run, Intent to Destroy was acquired by Starz for television. Intent to Destroy was nominated for an Emmy for Outstanding Historical Documentary at the 40th News and Documentary Emmy Awards.
