= Conversations with a Killer: The Jeffrey Dahmer Tapes =

American true crime docuseries on Netflix

- Genre: Docuseries
- Created by: Joe Berlinger
- Directed by: Joe Berlinger
- Country of origin: United States
- Original language: English
- No. of episodes: 3

Production
- Executive producer: Joe Berlinger
- Producer: Jonathan Jordan
- Cinematography: Luke Geissbuhler; Alexander Mandiola
- Editors: Kelly Kendrick; Heidi Schlatter; Timothy Ziegler
- Production company: Buffalo 8 Productions

Original release
- Network: Netflix
- Release: October 7, 2022

Conversations with a Killer: The Jeffrey Dahmer Tapes is a limited true crime docuseries created and directed by Joe Berlinger for Netflix. It is the third installment in the Conversations with a Killer series and succeeds Conversations with a Killer: The John Wayne Gacy Tapes. The series depicts the murder spree of serial killer Jeffrey Dahmer, who murdered, dismembered and cannibalized 17 men and boys between 1978 and 1991 in Wisconsin. The story is told through archival audio footage recorded during Dahmer's incarceration. It was released on October 7, 2022.

== Premise ==
Conversations with a Killer: The Jeffrey Dahmer Tapes examines the crimes and prosecution of serial killer Jeffrey Dahmer through previously unreleased recorded conversations between Dahmer and his defense attorney, Wendy Patrickus. The recordings were made between July and October 1991 and comprise more than 32 hours of conversations. The series also incorporates interviews with people connected to the case and examines how Dahmer was able to avoid detection for years.

== Production ==
The three-part documentary series was directed by Joe Berlinger. It incorporates previously unreleased recordings made by defense attorney Wendy Patrickus during her preparation of Jeffrey Dahmer’s defense in 1991, alongside contemporary interviews with members of the defense and prosecution teams.

== Episodes ==
"Sympathy for the Devil" - 58 minutes

"Can I Take Your Picture?" - 62 minutes

"Evil or Insane?" - 60 minutes

== Reception ==
In a review for the Chicago Sun-Times, Richard Roeper described the series as a serious, well-edited and comprehensive examination of the case, while questioning whether Dahmer’s previously unreleased recordings provided enough new insight to make the documentary feel necessary.

== See also ==
- Dahmer – Monster: The Jeffrey Dahmer Story
- My Friend Dahmer
- The Jeffrey Dahmer Files
- Dahmer
- The Secret Life: Jeffrey Dahmer
