= Tony Robbins: I Am Not Your Guru =

2016 documentary film by Joe Berlinger

- Directed by: Joe Berlinger
- Produced by: Joe Berlinger; Lisa Gray; Kevin Huffman
- Starring: Anthony Robbins; Julianne Hough; Maria Menounos; Milana Vayntrub
- Distributed by: Netflix
- Release dates: March 14, 2016 (South by Southwest); July 15, 2016
- Running time: 115 minutes
- Country: United States
- Language: English

Tony Robbins: I Am Not Your Guru is a 2016 documentary film directed by Joe Berlinger. It goes behind the scenes of Tony Robbins’ annual seminar "Date With Destiny" in Boca Raton, Florida. The film captures the efforts of producing the seminar as well as the effects on the participants.

== Cast ==
- Tony Robbins
- Julianne Hough
- Maria Menounos
- Milana Vayntrub
- Sage Bonnie Humphrey
- Dawn Watson

== Reception ==
The documentary received mixed reviews after its debut on Netflix in 2016. Critics noted that it felt more like a tribute to Robbins rather than an exploration of his life and work. After the film’s debut, Business Insider interviewed Berlinger, in which he said that he intentionally wanted to make a positive film, and noted that he received encouragement from fellow documentarian Michael Moore for “going forward with an uplifting project he believed in, even though he predicted critics would harshly judge his decision to do so.”
