= Shadowland (miniseries) =

2022 limited series from Joe Berlinger

- Genre: Television documentary, conspiracy theories in United States politics
- Created by: Joe Berlinger
- Based on: Reporting from The Atlantic
- Country of origin: United States
- Original language: English
- No. of seasons: 1
- No. of episodes: 6

Original release
- Network: Peacock
- Release: September 21, 2022

Shadowland is a six-part original limited series on Peacock. Based on the reporting on conspiracy theories in United States politics from The Atlantic, which posits that "conspiracy thinking" was in part responsible for the American Revolution and examined the rise of mainstream conspiracism, the 2022 series travels the country to interview both conspiracy theorists and experts on the rise of conspiratorial thinking. It was produced and spearheaded by renowned documentarian Joe Berlinger.

== Reception ==
The limited series received generally positive reviews from critics and audiences. Time described it as "terrifying" and compared it favorably to the 2022 Ken Burns documentary miniseries The U.S. and the Holocaust. Common Sense Media gave the series a positive review, writing that it was "disturbing".
