= Paradise Lost 3: Purgatory =

2011 American documentary film

- Directed by: Joe Berlinger; Bruce Sinofsky
- Produced by: Joe Berlinger; Jonathan Silberberg
- Starring: Jessie Misskelley Jr. Damien Echols; Jason Baldwin
- Cinematography: Bob Richman
- Edited by: Alyse Ardell Spiegel
- Music by: Wendy Blackstone; Metallica
- Distributed by: HBO
- Release dates: September 11, 2011 (Toronto); January 12, 2012 (HBO)
- Running time: 121 minutes
- Country: United States
- Language: English

Paradise Lost 3: Purgatory is a 2011 American documentary film directed by Joe Berlinger and Bruce Sinofsky, and sequel to their films Paradise Lost: The Child Murders at Robin Hood Hills (1996) and Paradise Lost 2: Revelations (2000). The three films are about West Memphis Three, three teenage boys accused of the May 1993 murders and sexual mutilation of three prepubescent boys as a part of an alleged satanic ritual in West Memphis, Arkansas. Purgatory offers an update on the case of the West Memphis Three, who were all recognized guilty of the murders in 1994 but kept on claiming their innocence since then, before culminating with the trio's attempt at an Alford plea.

The film premiered at the 2011 Toronto International Film Festival on September 11, 2011, before airing on HBO on January 12, 2012. It received a nomination for the Academy Award for Best Documentary Feature, as well as Primetime Emmy Award nominations for Exceptional Merit in Documentary Filmmaking and Outstanding Directing for Nonfiction Programming.

== Description ==
Joe Berlinger and Bruce Sinofsky update the case of the West Memphis Three since the release of Paradise Lost 2: Revelations in 2000. Damien Echols's defense team has hired some of the most renowned forensic scientists to collect DNA and other evidence that had never been tested during the 1994 trials in hopes of getting a new trial. The defense teams and supporters of Echols, Jason Baldwin, and Jessie Misskelley have uncovered new details that occurred during the trial that led to guilty verdicts against them.

Central are the allegations of jury misconduct with the jury foreman discussing the case with an attorney during the Echols-Baldwin trial and bringing Misskelley's confession into deliberations even though it was not let into evidence. The forensic experts have uncovered DNA and new witnesses that focus suspicion toward Terry Hobbs, the stepfather of one of the murder victims.

A hair found in the ligature that bound one of the victims is a match to him, he has told several conflicting stories concerning his whereabouts during the time of the murders, and he has a history of violence against his wife and possibly his stepson. While many are convinced he should be considered a suspect, the West Memphis, Arkansas Police Department have only questioned him and do not consider him a suspect.

Appeals for a new trial based on the new evidence have been denied by the original trial judge. But in November 2010, the Arkansas Supreme Court threw out that ruling and granted an evidentiary hearing scheduled for December 2011, to decide if the evidence is enough for a new trial. This brings new hope to the defendants and their supporters that they will finally get the fair trial they never got.

In August 2011, four months before the hearing is to take place, the prosecutors and defense lawyers talked over a plea deal that would allow the three men to walk out of prison, on the condition that they plead guilty but can maintain their innocence. They reluctantly accept the deal, and after 18 years and 78 days, they walk free from prison.

== Release ==
Originally intended to be another installment in which the three men remained in prison, the film was to premiere on the HBO network in November 2011. The world premiere of the film was announced to occur at the Toronto International Film Festival in September 2011.

Due to the sudden August 19 release from prison of the West Memphis Three, the filmmakers decided to postpone the film for another two months, to give the series a definitive ending, and a theatrical release, potentially allowing qualification for Best Documentary Feature at the 84th Academy Awards. Interviews used for the film featuring the newly freed men began shooting the day following their release on August 20.

The film, in its original form, still made its premiere at the Toronto International Film Festival, while the re-cut version premiered at the New York Film Festival. The re-cut version premiered on October 10, 2011. The three men, accompanied by their families, attorneys, and supporters, attended the event.

In January 2012, Paradise Lost 3: Purgatory was among five documentary features to be nominated for an Oscar in the 2012 Academy Awards ceremony.

== Reception ==
=== Critical response ===
Paradise Lost 3: Purgatory has an approval rating of 100% on review aggregator website Rotten Tomatoes, based on 16 reviews, and an average rating of 7.86/10. It also has a score of 85 out of 100 on Metacritic, based on 4 critics, indicating "universal acclaim".
