= Hollywood High (2003 film) =

2003 American documentary film

- Directed by: Bruce Sinofsky
- Country of origin: United States
- Original language: English

Production
- Producer: Michael Bonfiglio
- Cinematography: Robert Richman
- Editors: Myron I. Kerstein; Kristine Smith
- Running time: 60 minutes

Original release
- Network: AMC
- Release: March 31, 2003

Hollywood High is a 2003 documentary television film about the depiction of drug addiction in film. It was directed by Bruce Sinofsky, and features appearances by Darren Aronofsky, Jared Leto and Hubert Selby Jr. It was originally aired on AMC on March 31, 2003.

The Los Angeles Times reported that the documentary "examines how the seductive highs and excruciating lows of drug use have evolved on-screen during the last 60 years" and that "it offers plenty for movie fans to think about." The Cincinnati Enquirer called it "a surprisingly well-crafted and honest documentary" containing interviews with "some frank people who have something to say." The Columbia Companion to American History on Film calls it "particularly acute in its analysis of Hollywood 'drug movies' from Reefer Madness (1936) to Requiem for a Dream (2000)."
