= Conversations with a Killer: The John Wayne Gacy Tapes =

American docu-series on Netflix

- Promotional poster
- Genre: Docuseries
- Created by: Joe Berlinger
- Directed by: Joe Berlinger
- Composer: Justin Melland
- Country of origin: United States
- Original language: English
- No. of seasons: 1
- No. of episodes: 3

Production
- Executive producer: Joe Berlinger
- Editor: Cy Christiansen

Original release
- Network: Netflix
- Release: April 20, 2022

Conversations with a Killer: The John Wayne Gacy Tapes is a limited docuseries created and directed by Joe Berlinger for Netflix. It is the second installment in the Conversations with a Killer series and succeeds Conversations with a Killer: The Ted Bundy Tapes. The series depicts the murder spree of serial killer John Wayne Gacy, who killed at least 33 teenage boys and young men between 1972 and 1978 in Chicago, Illinois.

The story is depicted through never-before-heard archival audio footage that was recorded during Gacy's incarceration and interviews with participants close to the case and from one of the surviving victims. It was released on April 20, 2022.

On the review aggregator website Rotten Tomatoes, 86% of 7 critics' reviews are positive.

== See also ==
- To Catch a Killer
