= Brother's Keeper (1992 film) =

1992 film by Joe Berlinger and Bruce Sinofsky

- Film poster
- Directed by: Joe Berlinger; Bruce Sinofsky
- Produced by: Joe Berlinger; Bruce Sinofsky
- Starring: Delbert Ward; Lyman Ward; Roscoe Ward; Bill Ward
- Music by: Molly Mason; Jay Ungar
- Production company: Wellspring Media Inc.
- Distributed by: Creative Thinking International Ltd.
- Release date: January 1992
- Running time: 104 minutes
- Country: United States
- Language: English
- Box office: $1,305,915

Brother's Keeper is a 1992 documentary directed by Joe Berlinger and Bruce Sinofsky. The film is about an alleged 1990 murder in the village of Munnsville, New York.

The film is in the "Direct Cinema" style of the Maysles brothers, who had formerly employed Berlinger and Sinofsky.

== Summary ==
In a rural farming community near Utica, New York, Delbert Ward is accused of killing his brother William.

== Release ==
After its theatrical run, Brother's Keeper aired on PBS as part of the series American Playhouse.

== The Alleged Murder Case ==
William Ward, who had been ill for years, was found dead one morning. His brother Delbert was accused of killing him, perhaps by smothering. The prosecution's theory at trial was that Delbert had performed a mercy killing in order to put William out of his misery after a period of severe headaches and declining health. As the film progresses, it is revealed that during the coroner's examination of William's body, semen was found on clothing and on William's leg, leading to the prosecution's suggestion that Delbert had killed William in an episode of "sex gone bad."

Delbert Ward was acquitted at trial, largely because of the lack of any physical evidence and because the New York State Police violated Delbert's rights by coercing a confession (which he later retracted) and having him sign a written statement which he could not understand due to his illiteracy.

=== Ward Boys ===
"The Ward 'boys' were four brothers who tended a dairy herd on their farm", described by neighbours as "a throwback to the pioneer days" who live by themselves, but weren't hermits or recluses.

After the arrest and charging of Delbert, "nearly 900 people have signed petitions calling on the county prosecutor to review the autopsy report on William Ward. When a judge set bail at $10,000 on June 25, Delbert Ward’s supporters raised the sum outside the courtroom within a few minutes", with neighbours expressing belief in Delbert's innocence. Community members continued raising money to hire two private investigators to bolster Delbert's case.

Delbert Ward died at age 67 at Bassett Hospital in Cooperstown, New York on August 6, 1998.

Roscoe Ward died at age 88 on June 23, 2007.

Lyman Ward died at age 85 in Utica, New York on August 15, 2007.

== Accolades ==
=== Wins ===
- Directors Guild of America, USA: DGA Award for Outstanding Directorial Achievement in Documentary/Actuality
- National Board of Review, USA: NBR Award for Best Documentary
- New York Film Critics Circle Awards: NYFCC Award for Best Documentary
- Sundance Film Festival: Audience Award for Documentary

=== Nominations ===
- Sundance Film Festival: Grand Jury Prize for Documentary
