= Joe Berlinger and Bruce Sinofsky =

Team of American documentary filmmakers

Joe Berlinger
- Born: October 30, 1961 (age 63); Bridgeport, Connecticut, U.S.

Bruce Sinofsky
- Born: March 31, 1956; Boston, Massachusetts, U.S.
- Died: February 21, 2015 (aged 58)

Joe Berlinger (born October 30, 1961) and Bruce Sinofsky (March 31, 1956 – February 21, 2015) were a team of American documentary filmmakers that have won cult fame and critical acclaim. The duo are probably best known for their trilogy of Paradise Lost films about the so-called West Memphis Three, and for their 2004 Metallica documentary Metallica: Some Kind of Monster. Though they often worked together, Berlinger and Sinofsky also separately directed their own projects.

== The West Memphis Three ==
Originally intended to be a documentary about "three guilty teenagers on trial for murder", Sinofsky and Berlinger soon decided that their film Paradise Lost would take a different path. Paradise Lost chronicles the 1993 murders of three 8-year-old boys, Stephen Branch, Christopher Byers, and Michael Moore in rural Arkansas, and argues that the fear and panic of satanism, along with questionable police work, led to the arrests and convictions of three teenagers, Damien Echols, Jason Baldwin, and Jessie Miskelley for the murders, otherwise known as the West Memphis Three. Since its 1996 premier on HBO, the film has helped fuel interest and support for the convicted men. Some believe the three were convicted more for their choices in fashion and music than for actual evidence.

The first film was followed in 2000 by Paradise Lost 2: Revelations which revealed more evidence and findings that intended to further prove the innocence of Baldwin, Echols, and Misskelley. The film explores the possibility that the three children could have been murdered by the stepfather of Christopher Byers, John Mark Byers. Paradise Lost 3: Purgatory (2011) exonerates Byers, explores another suspect, stepfather Terry Hobbs, and chronicles the eventual release of the West Memphis Three from jail in August 2011.

Citing other documentary films such as Errol Morris's crime film The Thin Blue Line (1988), Berlinger and Sinofsky's intentions were for the films to "have a more dramatic result" and lead to the men being exonerated from prison.

== Work with Metallica ==
At the time of the trials, the West Memphis Three were fans of heavy metal band Metallica. Looking for music to use in the first Paradise Lost film, Berlinger and Sinofsky approached Metallica, who at the time rarely allowed their music to be used in films. The band permitted the filmmakers to use their music for free in all three Paradise Lost films. These meetings created a friendship between the filmmakers and band and would lead to the film Metallica: Some Kind of Monster which chronicles the making of Metallica's 2003 album St. Anger. Entertainment Weekly reviewer Owen Gleiberman called it "one of the most revelatory rock portraits ever made".

== Filmography ==
Year	Film	Credited as		
Year	Film	Directors	Producers	Editors
1992	Brother's Keeper	Yes	Yes	Yes
1992	Terminal Bliss (Only Bruce Sinofsky)	No	No	Yes
1996	Paradise Lost: The Child Murders at Robin Hood Hills	Yes	Yes	Yes
1998	Where It's At: The Rolling Stone State of the Union (TV Movie)	Yes	Yes	No
2000	Paradise Lost 2: Revelations (TV Movie)	Yes	Yes	No
2000	Book of Shadows: Blair Witch 2 (Only Joe Berlinger)	Yes	No	No
2001	Good Rockin' Tonight (Only Bruce Sinofsky)	Yes	Yes	No
2003	Hollywood High (Only Bruce Sinofsky)	Yes	Yes	No
2004	Metallica: Some Kind of Monster	Yes	Yes	No
2009	Crude (Only Joe Berlinger)	Yes	Yes	No
2011	Paradise Lost 3: Purgatory	Yes	Yes	No

== See also ==
- West Memphis Three
- Metallica
- Satanic ritual abuse
- Some Kind of Monster (song)
- St. Anger
- True crime
