= Conversations with a Killer: The Son of Sam Tapes =

2025 documentary series

- Directed by: Joe Berlinger
- Composer: Justin Melland
- Country of origin: United States
- Original language: English
- No. of episodes: 3

Production
- Executive producers: Joe Berlinger; Bud Brutsman; Jen Isaacson; Jon Kamen; Rachael Profiloski
- Cinematography: Jeff Hutchens

Original release
- Network: Netflix
- Release: July 30, 2025

Conversations With a Killer: The Son of Sam Tapes is a 2025 American three-part documentary series that explores the NYPD's search for serial killer David Berkowitz. It is directed by Joe Berlinger. It was released on Netflix on July 30, 2025.
