= Conversations with a Killer: The Ted Bundy Tapes =

American docuseries on Netflix

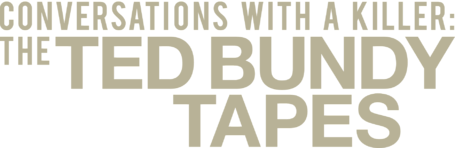
- Genre: Docu-series
- Created by: Joe Berlinger
- Written by: Joe Berlinger
- Directed by: Joe Berlinger
- Country of origin: United States
- Original language: English
- No. of seasons: 1
- No. of episodes: 4

Production
- Executive producers: Joe Berlinger; Jon Doran; Jon Kamen; Justin Wilkes; Matthew Helderman
- Cinematography: Adam Stone
- Running time: 51-74 minutes
- Production companies: Elastic; Gigantic Studios; Outpost Digital; RadicalMedia

Original release
- Network: Netflix
- Release: January 24, 2019

Conversations with a Killer: The Ted Bundy Tapes is an American documentary that premiered on Netflix on January 24, 2019, the 30th anniversary of Bundy's execution. Created and directed by Joe Berlinger, the four episodes ranging from 51 to 74 minutes long were sourced from over 100 hours of interviews and archival footage of serial killer Ted Bundy, as well as interviews with his friends, surviving victims, and the law enforcement members who worked on his case.

== Summary ==
The series chronologically traces Bundy's life, crimes, arrests, his escapes and death in detail. Archival footage, police evidence, personal photos, and Stephen Michaud's 1980 death row interviews are all present in the series. People related to the Bundy case include surviving victims, witnesses, his family and former friends, along with officers, officials, and journalists.

== Cases covered ==
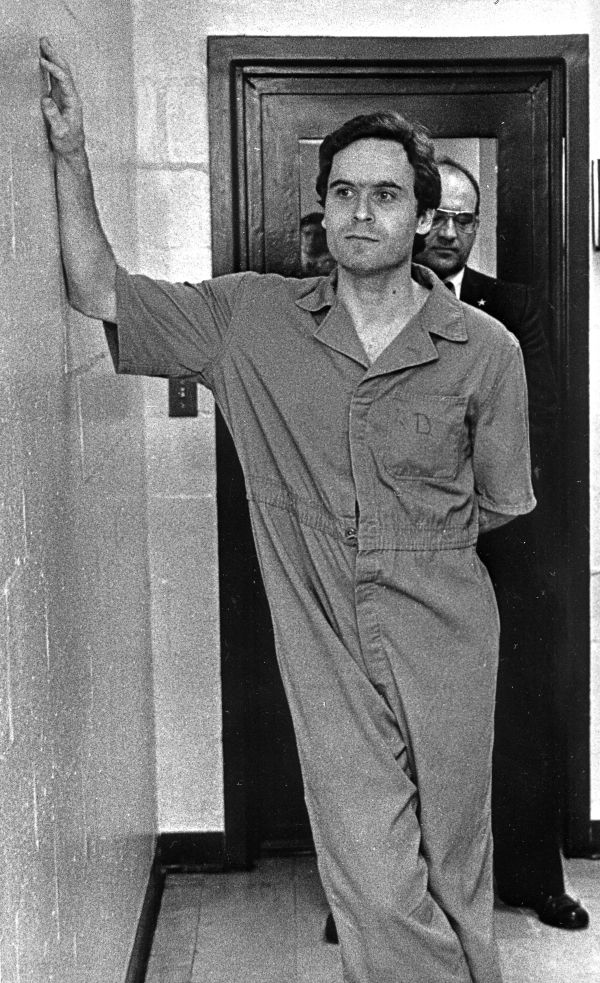
Bundy in a Florida prison

=== Chi Omega homicide ===
After escaping the Garfield County Jail in Glenwood Springs, Bundy made his way to Florida, where he attacked the Chi Omega sorority house at Florida State University. He brutally beat up four women and killed two, Lisa Levy and Margaret Bowman. He also sexually assaulted Levy. Bundy fled the scene, but left a trace evidence which later connected him to the homicides: a double bite mark on the buttocks of Levy. A month later, Bundy was arrested by Pensacola Police when officers became suspicious of his driving. Upon finding several stolen credit cards, Bundy finally revealed his name to police. The murders at the Chi Omega house caught their attention, and they suspected Bundy was connected to the series of murders of young women all over the country. Leon County sheriff W. Kenneth Katsaris decided to try to match the bite marks found on Levy's body to Bundy's teeth. Orthodontists took a mold of Bundy's teeth and called in Dr. Richard Souviron, a forensic odontologist, on the witness stand in court to state whether the bite marks found on Levy matched. After Souviron confirmed the match, the jury spent six hours in deliberation to decide if the defendant was guilty, and ultimately found him guilty of first degree murder.

=== Abduction and murder of Kimberly Leach ===
Before he was arrested by the Pensacola police, Bundy abducted another victim – 12-year old Kimberly Leach, who disappeared during the school day on February 9, 1978. Two months after her disappearance, Leach's body was found in a shed. The 12-year-old victim had been assaulted and murdered. In 1980, Bob Dekle, a prosecutor who was fighting the case against Bundy, connected Bundy to Leach's case by evidence found in Bundy's van and on clothes he supposedly wore on the day he killed Leach that matched the clothing fibers from Leach's clothes. Witnesses reported seeing a little girl walk with a man who resembled Bundy towards a white van. With this evidence, a jury found Bundy guilty, and he was again given the death penalty.

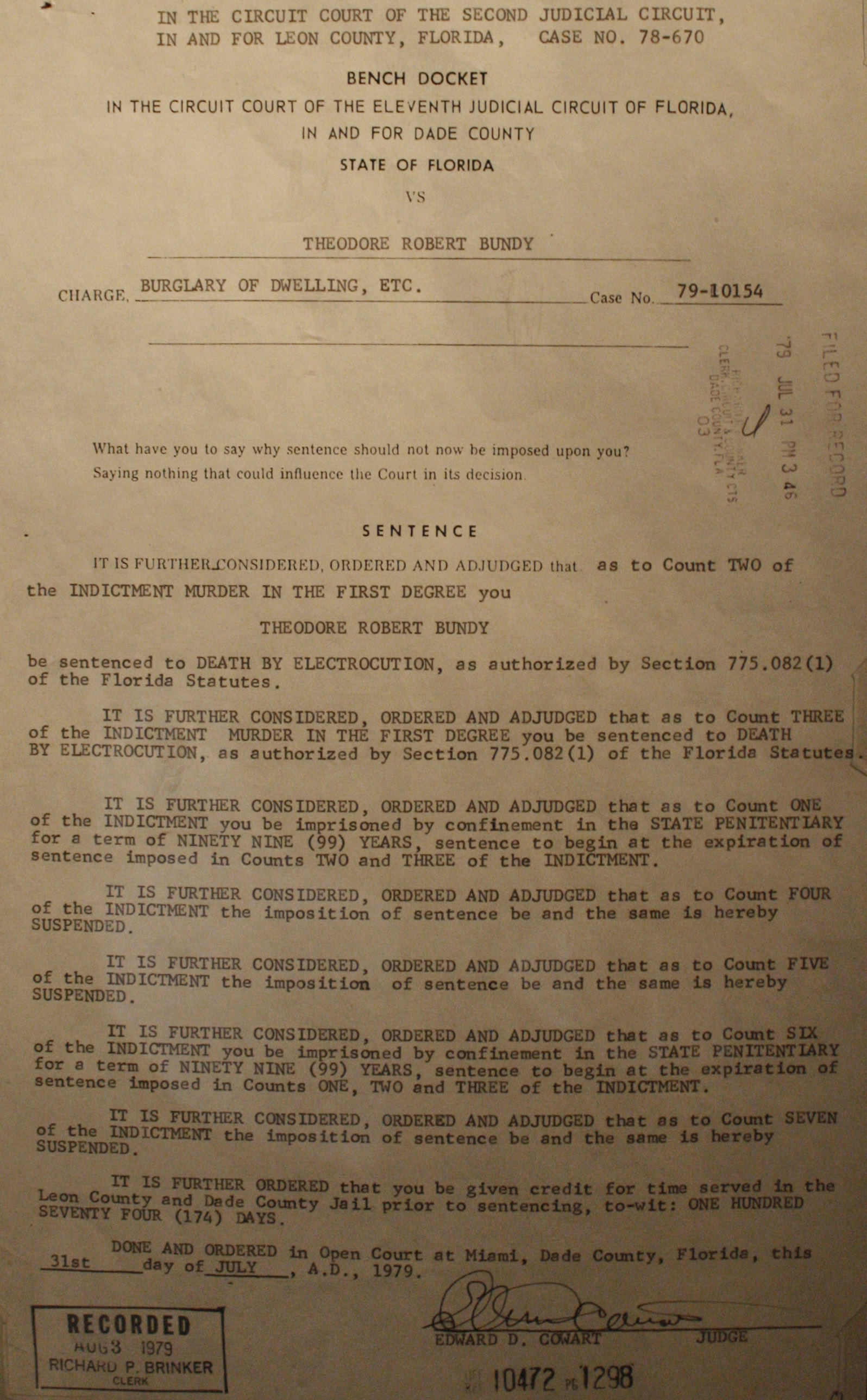
Bundy's death sentencing document

=== Confession and death penalty ===
On January 22, 1989, two days prior to his execution, Bundy confessed to killing around thirty women.

== Critical response ==
The series received mixed reviews from critics. On review aggregator Rotten Tomatoes, the show holds an approval rating of 54%, with an average rating of 5.88/10 based on 24 reviews. The site's critical consensus reads, "Laced with troubling irony, Conversations with a Killer: The Ted Bundy Tapes skirts introspection, making it just as illusive as its subject." On Metacritic, which uses a weighted average, the series has a score of 55 based on reviews from 6 critics, indicating "mixed or average reviews".

In Vulture, Matt Zoller Seitz wrote that he was a little disappointed in the series. He wrote that though he appreciated the "weaving" of news reports, images and basic interviews, just because Stephen Michaud was not able to figure Bundy's motives does not mean that the series lost its purpose.

== Episodes ==
No.	Title	Original release date
1	"Handsome Devil"	January 24, 2019
The series starts with two journalists, Stephen Michaud and Hugh Aynesworth, discussing a new project that may attract audiences: Ted Bundy's story from his own perspective. The episode introduces the first couple of girls who went missing around the University of Washington area. Police officials and reporters working on this case are also introduced.
2	"One of Us"	January 24, 2019
When a call came from a woman who seemed worried about her boyfriend named Ted, the police finally had some suspects. Carol DeRonch, a victim who managed to escape from Bundy, gave the police a leg up in their investigation. He is finally arrested for the abduction of DeRonch.
3	"Not My Turn to Watch Him"	January 24, 2019
After escaping from jail twice, Bundy changes his appearance to confuse the police. His second escape leads him to Florida, where he committed three murders but left a little bit of evidence behind. A run-in with the Florida police ends Bundy's escape.
4	"Burn Bundy Burn"	January 24, 2019
The last episode shows Bundy defending himself in trials involving the murder of three women in Florida. With evidence and witnesses against him, the court orders a death penalty and puts Bundy on death watch. A day before his execution, a psychologist who studied the brain activity of violent men concludes that Bundy was manic depressive. The episode shows the events that occurred days before his execution, which include him confessing to the murders of 30 women from six states.

== See also ==
- Extremely Wicked, Shockingly Evil and Vile
- The Stranger Beside Me
