= Bruce Sinofsky =

American documentary film director (1956–2015)

Bruce Sinofsky (March 31, 1956 – February 21, 2015) was an American documentary film director, particularly known for his films the Paradise Lost trilogy, Brother's Keeper and Metallica: Some Kind of Monster, all created with Joe Berlinger.

== Early life and education ==
Sinofsky was born to a Jewish family in Boston, Massachusetts. He graduated from the Tisch School of the Arts of New York University in 1978.

== Career ==
Sinofsky began his career at Maysles Films. As Senior Editor at the company, he worked on commercials and feature films until 1991, when he and Joe Berlinger formed their own production company, Creative Thinking International. They jointly produced, edited and directed documentary films which have appeared on over 50 critics choice lists, including Brother's Keeper (1992), the Paradise Lost trilogy (1996, 2004, 2011), Hollywood High (2003) and Metallica: Some Kind of Monster (2004).

The first movie Sinofsky directed, in 1992, was the documentary Brother's Keeper, which tells the story of Delbart Ward, an elderly man in Munnsville, New York, who was charged with second-degree murder following the death of his brother William. Chicago Sun-Times film critic Roger Ebert, in his review of the movie, called it "an extraordinary documentary about what happened next, as a town banded together to stop what folks saw as a miscarriage of justice."

The Paradise Lost trilogy chronicles the inhabitants of a small southern town a year after a series of brutal murders, in a style similar to that of award-winning documentary filmmaker Errol Morris.

Sinofsky and Berlinger's work used various styles, including a paean to cinéma vérité. Metallica: Some Kind of Monster covers the heavy metal band Metallica as they participate in group therapy before recording their first album in five years. The pair also made a documentary on the southern record label for blues and country western artists, Sun Records called Good Rockin' Tonight.

== Death and tributes ==
Sinofsky died on February 21, 2015, at the age of 58, from diabetes-related complications. The band Metallica paid tribute to him as a "courageous man with deep empathy and wisdom who wasn't afraid to dig deep to tell the story." Berlinger wrote that Sinofsky's "humanity is on every frame of the films that he leaves behind."

The 2016 film Tony Robbins: I Am Not Your Guru is dedicated to his memory.

The 2018 documentary May It Last: A Portrait of the Avett Brothers is also dedicated to his memory.

== Awards ==
Sinofsky won a Directors Guild of America Award and two Emmys, one for the first film in the Paradise Lost trilogy, The Child Murders at Robin Hood Hills. He was nominated for an Academy Award for the third film in the trilogy, Purgatory, in 2011.

== See also ==
- Joe Berlinger and Bruce Sinofsky
