= Joe Berlinger =

American documentary filmmaker

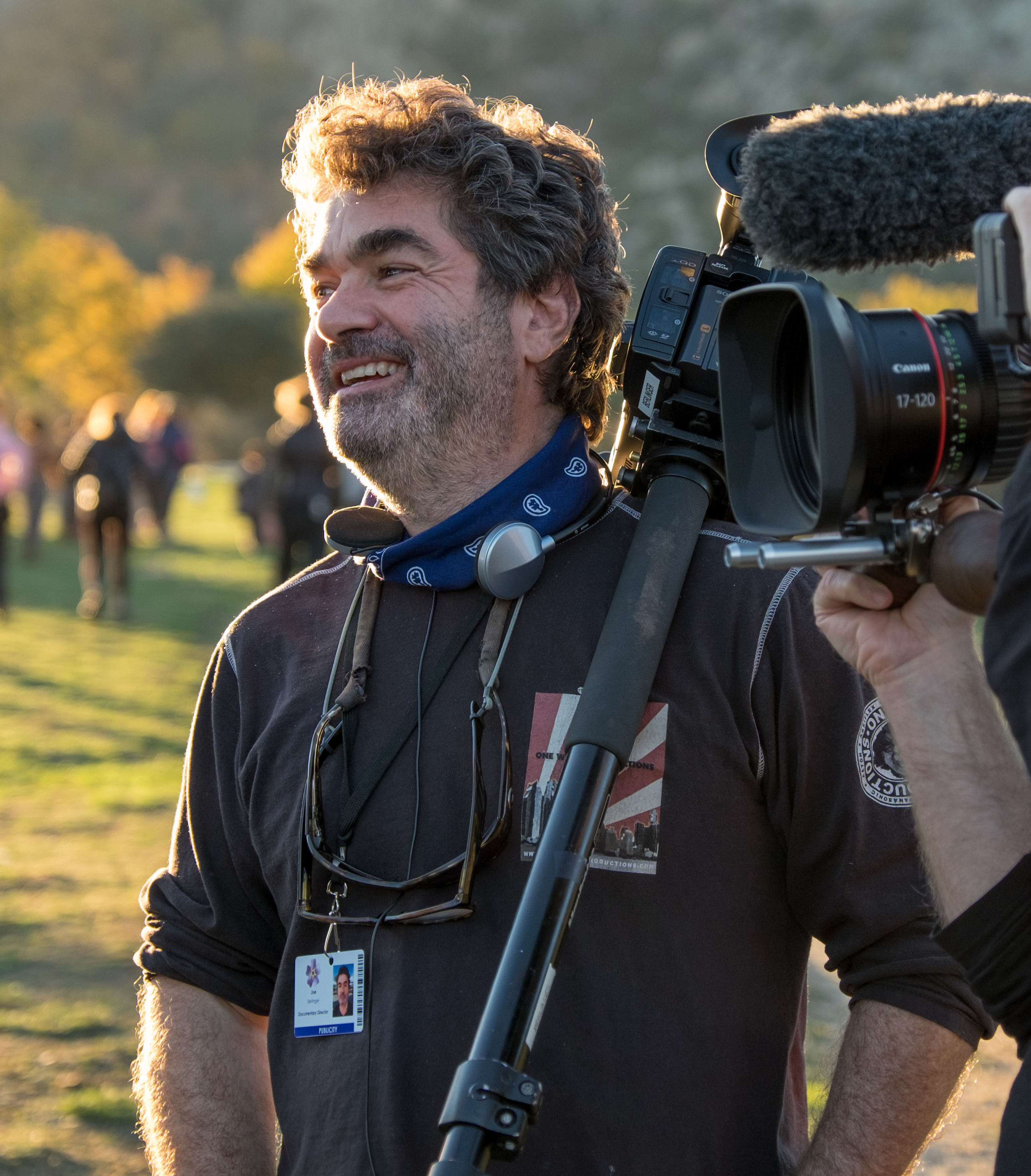
- Berlinger in 2015
- Born: October 30, 1961 (age 65); Bridgeport, Connecticut, U.S.
- Occupation: Documentary filmmaker
- Years active: 1989–present
- Spouse: Loren Eiferman

Joseph Berlinger (born October 30, 1961) is an American documentary filmmaker and producer. Particularly focused on true crime documentaries, Berlinger's films and docu-series draw attention to social justice issues in the US and abroad in such films as Brother's Keeper, Paradise Lost: The Child Murders at Robin Hood Hills, Crude, Whitey: United States of America v. James J. Bulger and Intent To Destroy: Death, Denial and Depiction.

A 2017 HuffPost article stated, "Brother's Keeper" (1992) and the "Paradise Lost trilogy" (1996–2011) helped pioneer the style of documentary filmmaking seen in Netflix's recent true crime sensation, Making a Murderer—a combination of artful cinematography, a stirring musical soundtrack, and a dramatic narrative structure as compelling as any scripted film."

Berlinger spearheaded and directed two 2019 projects centered on the infamous serial killer Ted Bundy: the Netflix docu-series Conversations with a Killer: The Ted Bundy Tapes, and the drama film Extremely Wicked, Shockingly Evil and Vile, starring Zac Efron. In 2022 Bloomberg described Berlinger as a "True Crime Hit Factory" for Netflix whose work has "redefined crime documentaries as a vehicle for social justice." The article also quoted Adam Del Deo, VP for original documentary series at Netflix: “He’s the gold standard in true crime. The moral compass that he has, the sense of responsibility he has for victims and for getting the story right and shining a light on it, that is something that is very unique.”

== Early life and education ==
Joe Berlinger was born on October 30, 1961, into a Jewish family in Bridgeport, Connecticut. He grew up in the greater Bridgeport area before pursuing higher education. In 1983, Berlinger graduated from Colgate University in Hamilton, New York, with a Bachelor of Arts degree in German language, a program that emphasizes linguistic proficiency and cultural studies in German-speaking regions. Shortly after completing his degree, he worked at an advertising agency in Frankfurt, Germany, before transitioning into documentary filmmaking, where he would later become known for influential works in the true crime genre.

== Early career ==
After graduating from Colgate University, Berlinger took a position working at an advertising agency in Frankfurt, Germany. He soon transitioned into the world of film, working as an apprentice to the iconic documentarians Albert and David Maysles. Joe met his future directing partner, Bruce Sinofsky, while they were both employed by the Maysles. Together they would make their directing debut with the 1992 film Brother's Keeper.

== Collaboration with Bruce Sinofsky ==
Working as a directing duo, Berlinger and Sinofsky created the landmark documentary Brother's Keeper (1992), which tells the story of Delbert Ward, an uneducated elderly man in Munnsville, New York, who was charged with second-degree murder following the death of his brother William. Film critic Roger Ebert called it "an extraordinary documentary about what happened next, as a town banded together to stop what folks saw as a miscarriage of justice."

The pair went on to direct the Paradise Lost Trilogy--Paradise Lost: The Child Murders at Robin Hood Hills (1996), Paradise Lost 2: Revelations (2000), and Paradise Lost 3: Purgatory (2011), which earned the pair an Academy Award nomination. The trilogy, shot over two decades, focused on the West Memphis Three, a group of teenagers who were wrongfully convicted of the brutal murder of three children. The trilogy raised doubts about the legitimacy of the teenagers' convictions and spurred a movement to release them from prison, where one of the men was awaiting a death sentence. In 2011, the West Memphis Three were released from their respective death and life sentences after filing an Alford Plea with the Federal Court of Arkansas.

Metallica: Some Kind of Monster (2004), called "one of the most revelatory rock portraits ever made" follows the popular heavy metal band Metallica. Berlinger and Sinofsky capture the group at a crossroads, as bassist Jason Newsted quits the band and frontman James Hetfield abruptly leaves to enter a rehabilitation facility due to alcohol abuse. The film was critically acclaimed for capturing Metallica, a global phenomenon, at a moment of true vulnerability.

Sinofsky died on February 21, 2015, at the age of 58, from diabetes-related complications. The band Metallica paid tribute to him as a "courageous man with deep empathy and wisdom who wasn't afraid to dig deep to tell the story." Berlinger wrote that Sinofsky's "humanity is on every frame of the films that he leaves behind."

== Other works ==
=== Film ===
Berlinger made his narrative feature debut with Book of Shadows: Blair Witch 2 (2000).

Berlinger's film Crude (2009) focused on the lawsuit by Ecuadorean plaintiffs against Chevron Corporation, for its alleged responsibility for continuing sites of pollution in that country. Under African Skies (2012), follows Paul Simon as he returns to South Africa for a reunion concert, celebrating the 25th anniversary of his landmark album Graceland which featured many iconic South African Musicians. In 2014 Whitey: United States of America V. James J. Bulger, a documentary about the infamous Boston mob boss Whitey Bulger was released. Berlinger traces Whitey's trail of terror as well as the FBI's role in both enabling him and taking him down.

Berlinger captured Tony Robbins' exclusive and notoriously private Date With Destiny seminar in his 2016 film Tony Robbins: I Am Not Your Guru. Berlinger chronicles the six-day seminar and the personal evolutions and breakthroughs of participants, Robbins and even Berlinger himself.

In 2017, Berlinger released Intent to Destroy: Death, Denial & Depiction, an examination of the Armenian genocide through both seated interviews with experts and behind-the-scenes footage of Terry George's historical drama The Promise (2016).

In 2019, Berlinger re-entered the world of narrative film and directed Extremely Wicked, Shockingly Evil and Vile, his second feature. The film chronicles the life of serial killer Ted Bundy and his longtime girlfriend Elizabeth Kendall. Starring Zac Efron, Lily Collins, Jim Parsons, John Malkovich, Jeffrey Donovan, Haley Joel Osment and Angela Sarafyan, the film screened at the 2019 Sundance Film Festival in January.

=== Television ===
In addition to his feature work, Berlinger has created or played pivotal roles as executive producer, director and/or producer of many acclaimed television series, such as the Emmy-winning 10 Days That Unexpectedly Changed America for History, the Emmy-nominated Oprah's Master Class for OWN, and the star-studded Iconoclasts for Sundance, which paired creative visionaries across multiple disciplines - such as Eddie Vedder and Laird Hamilton, Chuck D and Kareem Abdul Jabbar, Charlize Theron and Jane Goodall - for tandem portraits and discussions about their lives, influences, and art.

Berlinger continued his passion for using media to bring attention to the issue of wrongful conviction with his television series Wrong Man for Starz, which took an in-depth look into six separate cases of alleged wrongful conviction over two seasons. Confronting A Serial Killer, which premiered in April 2021 on Starz, follows acclaimed author Jillian Lauren as she forms an unprecedented bond with the most prolific serial killer in American history, Samuel Little. Lauren uncovers Little's darkest secrets, aids law enforcement in solving a multitude of cold case murders targeting marginalized communities, and examines how flaws in our criminal justice system aided in him escaping legal consequences for decades.

Since 2019's Conversations with a Killer: The Ted Bundy Tapes and Extremely Wicked, Shockingly Evil and Vile, Berlinger has spearheaded multiple hit documentary series for Netflix, including Jeffrey Epstein: Filthy Rich (2020), Crime Scene: The Vanishing at the Cecil Hotel (2021), and Madoff: The Monster of Wall Street (2023).

=== Literature and philanthropy ===
In collaboration with journalist Greg Milner, Berlinger wrote the book Metallica: This Monster Lives (2004), about his early career, accomplishments and challenges forging his path in the world of film. The book is centered around the filming of Metallica: Some Kind of Monster.

Berlinger serves on the board of Proclaim Justice, a nonprofit dedicated to providing resources and building awareness around wrongful convictions. He also serves on the board of Rehabilitation Through the Arts, The Bedford Playhouse and the International Documentary Association.

== Legal battles over Crude ==
Chevron Corporation subpoenaed the outtakes from Berlinger's 2009 film Crude. Berlinger fought the request, citing reporters' privilege, but in 2010 a federal judge ordered Berlinger to turn over more than 600 hours of footage created during the film's production. Berlinger appealed, but in 2011 the US 2nd Circuit Court of Appeals upheld the lower court ruling against Berlinger, though with a slight reduction in the total hours of footage required.

After spending $1.3 million on legal fees on the case, Berlinger expressed concerns about being able to make documentaries about legal cases in the future.

== Paradise Lost ==
Berlinger is best known for the film series Paradise Lost, which documents the murder trial and the subsequent legal battles of three Arkansas teenagers, Damien Echols, Jason Baldwin and Jessie Misskelley Jr., convicted of murder. The court convicted the youths (known as the West Memphis Three) of murdering three eight-year-old boys as part of a "ritual killing," although no physical evidence linked the three young men to the crime. Paradise Lost documents the 20-year ordeal of these three young men from arrest to conviction, through years of unsuccessful legal efforts, to a plea bargain that resulted in their release in the summer of 2012.

The film series brought mainstream attention to the case, and many celebrities took up the cause of getting these young men out of prison and getting Damien Echols off death row. The mainstream attention, brought on by the documentary series, allowed for a well-financed legal team to investigate every lead in the case. These subsequent investigations showed the incompetence of the West Memphis police, who had never dealt with this type of crime, and that the police let other suspects disappear from the community; for example, a man covered in blood used a restroom in a restaurant within walking distance of the murder scene shortly after the time of the murders. In addition to the failure to apprehend the suspect, the police lost the blood samples, even though this strange man left blood all over the bathroom. This mistake meant that the experts could never determine if this strange man was covered in the victims' blood.

Ultimately, the defense team hired DNA experts to test genetic material after fighting the prosecution for years to get access to it, and these tests again proved that no physical evidence linked the West Memphis Three to the murders; rather, a hair from one boy's stepfather was found tied into one of the shoelaces used to hogtie the victims.

After a 2010 decision by the Arkansas Supreme Court regarding newly produced DNA evidence, attorneys for the West Memphis Three negotiated with prosecutors an Alford plea allowing them to assert their innocence while acknowledging enough evidence to convict them; the result, on August 19, 2011, was acceptance of the pleas by Judge David Laser, and his reduction of sentence of the three to time served, and their release with 10-year suspended sentences (after 18 years, 78 days in prison).

In October 2025, The New York Times called Paradise Lost “perhaps the most chilling of all true-crime documentaries.”

== Personal life ==
Joe Berlinger lives with his wife, artist Loren Eiferman, in Westchester County, New York.

== Filmography ==
Narrative Films

Year	Title	Director	Producer	Writer
2000	Book of Shadows: Blair Witch 2	Yes		Yes
2019	Extremely Wicked, Shockingly Evil and Vile	Yes	Yes	

Documentary films

Year	Title	Director	Producer	Writer	Note
1992	Brother's Keeper	Yes	Yes		Co-directed with Bruce Sinofsky; Also editor
1996	Paradise Lost: The Child Murders at Robin Hood Hills	Yes	Yes		Co-directed with Bruce Sinofsky; Also editor
1998	Where It's At: The Rolling Stone State of the Union	Yes	Yes		TV movie
2000	Paradise Lost 2: Revelations	Yes	Yes		With Bruce Sinofsky
2004	Metallica: Some Kind of Monster	Yes	Yes		With Bruce Sinofsky
2009	Crude	Yes	Yes		Also cinematographer
2011	Paradise Lost 3: Purgatory	Yes	Yes		With Bruce Sinofsky
2012	Under African Skies	Yes	Yes		
2014	Whitey: United States of America v. James J. Bulger	Yes	Yes		
2016	Tony Robbins: I Am Not Your Guru	Yes	Yes		
2017	Intent to Destroy	Yes	Yes	Yes	

Documentary series (Since 2019)

Year	Title	Director	Executive Producer	Writer	Note
2019	Conversations with a Killer: The Ted Bundy Tapes	Yes	Yes	Yes	Also creator
2020	Jeffrey Epstein: Filthy Rich		Yes		
2021	Crime Scene: The Vanishing at the Cecil Hotel	Yes	Yes		Also creator
2021	Murder Among the Mormons		Yes		
2021	Confronting a Serial Killer	Yes	Yes		
2021	Crime Scene: The Times Square Killer	Yes	Yes		
2022	Conversations with a Killer: The John Wayne Gacy Tapes	Yes	Yes		
2022	Conversations with a Killer: The Jeffrey Dahmer Tapes	Yes	Yes		
2022	Shadowland		Yes		
2023	Madoff: The Monster of Wall Street	Yes	Yes		
2024	Hitler and the Nazis: Evil on Trial	Yes	Yes		
2024	Cold Case: Who Killed JonBenét Ramsey	Yes	Yes		Also creator
2025	Cold Case: The Tylenol Murders		Yes		
2025	Conversations with a Killer: The Son of Sam Tapes	Yes	Yes	Yes	Also creator
2026	Conversations with a Killer: The Charles Manson Tapes	Yes	Yes	Yes	Also creator
