= Damien Echols =

American writer; one of the West Memphis Three (born 1974)

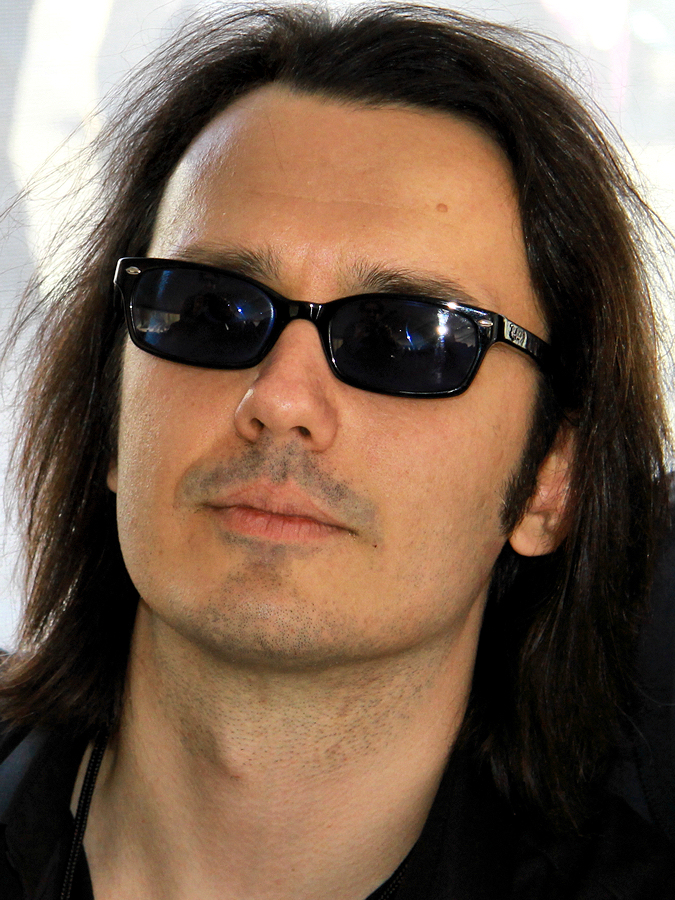
- Echols at the 2012 Texas Book Festival, Austin, Texas
- Born: Michael Wayne Hutchison; December 11, 1974 (age 51); Marion, Arkansas, U.S.
- Occupation: Writer
- Known for: Member of the West Memphis Three
- Website: damienechols.com

Damien Wayne Echols (born Michael Wayne Hutchison; December 11, 1974) is an American author who first became known as one of three teenagers, the West Memphis Three, convicted of a triple murder in 1994 despite the lack of physical evidence connecting them to the crime and the dubious nature of the other evidence. Upon his release from death row in 2011 under an Alford plea, Echols authored several autobiographical and spiritual books. He has been featured in multiple books, documentaries, and podcasts about his spiritual works and the West Memphis Three case.

== Biography ==
=== Early life ===
Damien Wayne Echols was born Michael Wayne Hutchison on December 11, 1974. He lived with his mother and father until their divorce, when he was 8. The family frequently moved and Echols would attend eight schools before the age of ten.

At the age of 13, he took a new name, with the last name of his stepfather Jack Echols.

The family settled in West Memphis, Arkansas, where Echols attended school. He was still in the ninth grade at the age of 17.

Echols, with his habit of dressing year round in a long black trenchcoat and an interest in witchcraft, was considered a misfit within the local community. He also wrote dark and expressive poems.

=== The Robin Hood Hills murders ===
In 1993, when Echols was 18, he was arrested along with Jason Baldwin (16) and Jessie Misskelley (17) for the murder of three eight-year-olds: Steve Branch, Michael Moore and Christopher Byers. They were convicted. No physical evidence connected Echols to the crime.

=== On death row ===
On March 19, 1994, Judge David Burnett sentenced Echols to death by lethal injection. On December 23, 1996, the Arkansas Supreme Court denied appeals from Echols and Baldwin. In May 1998, Echols won a hearing on charges that his defense counsel had been incompetent, but Judge Burnett ruled against him in June 1999.

In 2007, new DNA testing became available that was not technologically possible at the time of the crime, and produced evidence that hair found at the crime scene did not match Misskelley, Baldwin or Echols and possibly matched the stepfather of one of the victims. Based on this, the defendants asked Burnett for a new trial. In September 2008, Burnett denied retrials for all three saying the new evidence was "inconclusive".

Echols spent his time on death row at the Varner Unit Supermax. In his first years, he studied Buddhism and was doing meditation five to seven hours a day. Later, he became interested in ceremonial magic. He spent most of the 18 years in prison studying magic.

In 2005, he self-published his autobiography Almost Home with a foreword written by Margaret Cho.

=== Personal life ===
Echols has one child by his ex-girlfriend Domini Teer. Their son was born on September 12, 1993, while Echols was awaiting trial.

In 1996, Echols met his future wife Lorri Davis, a landscape architect who learned about the case after seeing Paradise Lost in New York and writing him a letter. They began a romantic relationship, and in 1997 Davis quit her job, moved to Little Rock, Arkansas, and began working on Echols' case.

In December 1999, they married in a Buddhist ceremony, held in the prison visiting room.

=== Release from prison ===
In November 2010, after Judge Burnett had retired from the bench, the Arkansas Supreme Court ordered new evidentiary hearings for all three defendants based on the new DNA evidence. The state's high court rebuked Burnett's 2008 decision not to grant Echols a hearing on the DNA evidence before rejecting his request for a new trial.

In 2010, after DNA evidence raised the possibility that they had not committed the crime, they were granted an evidentiary hearing. In August 2011, Echols's lawyers, Steve Braga and Patrick Benca negotiated an Alford plea, which allows the defendant to maintain their innocence while conceding that there is enough evidence to possibly convict them at trial. Under the plea deals, all three were resentenced to time-served for the murders (18 years and 75 days) and immediately released from prison.

=== Life after release ===
After the release from prison, Echols and his wife moved to New York City and lived in Peter Jackson's apartment. They later moved to Salem, Massachusetts, before finally settling in Harlem, New York City. In 2012, Echols published the book Life After Death, which became a New York Times Best Seller.

Also in 2012, West of Memphis, a documentary film directed and co-written by Amy J. Berg, and produced by Peter Jackson and Echols, was released in the US by Sony Pictures Classics. It has been reported that Jackson and Fran Walsh started to work on this project in 2005 and conducted their own private investigation. The film received a nomination for Best Documentary Screenplay from the Writers Guild of America.

In 2014, Echols and Davis co-authored a book Yours for Eternity, which consists of their letters while Echols was in prison.

Echols has had a number of art exhibitions, showing pieces of art that he created in prison. He has also held a number of events devoted to ceremonial magic.

In 2018, he published High Magick: A Guide to the Spiritual Practices That Saved My Life on Death Row, a book that described his spiritual experience in prison. It was followed by Angels and Archangels: A Magician's Guide, published in 2020.

In 2022, Damien and Davis published their second co-authored book together titled Ritual: An Essential Grimoire, which is a compendium of rituals, prayers, and meditations.

== In popular culture ==
=== Paradise Lost documentary series ===
Considering strong national interest in the case and the age of the suspected perpetrators, HBO commissioned Joe Berlinger and Bruce Sinofsky to film the trial and produce a documentary. In an unprecedented move, the judge allowed full access to the hearings, the victim's families and the accused. The resulting three film series became the most famous work of Bruce Sinofsky and won him an Emmy Award and a Peabody Award in 1996 and an Oscar Award nomination for 2011's Paradise Lost 3: Purgatory. The first film, Paradise Lost: The Child Murders at Robin Hood Hills, came out in 1996. It was the beginning of a world-wide campaign to free the young men who became known as The West Memphis Three.

=== Celebrity support and collaborations ===
A number of Hollywood celebrities, notably Pearl Jam lead vocalist Eddie Vedder and actor Johnny Depp, publicly advocated for the release of The Memphis Three. Vedder sat next to Echols's wife Lorri in the front row of the courtroom and embraced Echols once he was released. Echols co-wrote the lyrics to the song "Army Reserve" from the 2006 Pearl Jam album. Former Misfits vocalist Michale Graves also supported the case, and in October 2007 he recorded his Illusions album, featuring written content and backing vocals from Echols.

=== Devil's Knot book and film ===
Echols is a central figure of Devil's Knot: The True Story of the West Memphis Three, a 2002 true crime book by Mara Leveritt. In 2013, Atom Egoyan directed Devil's Knot, a feature film adaptation of the book starring Colin Firth and Reese Witherspoon, which was produced by Worldview Entertainment. Echols's character was played by James Hamrick. The film premiered at the 2013 Toronto International Film Festival and was released in U.S. theaters on May 9, 2014.

=== The Midnight Gospel appearance ===
In April 2020, Echols appeared as Darryl the Fish in The Midnight Gospel animated TV series aired on Netflix. His character walked the main character Clancy through the philosophy of magic.

=== Stranger Things character ===
In the fourth season of Netflix's Stranger Things the character and story of Eddie Munson is closely based on Echols' life. The writers reportedly took inspiration from the Paradise Lost documentary.

== Post-conviction DNA testing and 2024 Supreme Court ruling ==
Following his 1994 conviction and sentence of death for the 1993 West Memphis murders, Damien Echols spent seventeen years on death row at the Varner Unit Supermax facility while seeking post-conviction relief. In August 2011, Echols, Jason Baldwin, and Jessie Misskelley entered into an Alford plea agreement with state prosecutors. Under the agreement, their capital murder convictions were set aside, and they entered guilty pleas while maintaining their actual innocence. Circuit Judge David Laser sentenced the three men to time served (18 years and 78 days) with a ten-year suspended sentence, resulting in Echols's immediate release from state custody.

Despite his release from physical custody, Echols continued to pursue complete exoneration through advanced forensic testing under Arkansas Act 1780 of 2001 (Ark. Code Ann. § 16-112-201 et seq.), which governs post-conviction petitions for scientific testing based on new technological developments. In 2020, Echols filed a petition requesting M-VAC (microbial vacuum extraction) DNA testing on crime scene evidence, including ligatures used to bind the victims, which had not been subjected to this specific extraction method during prior testing rounds.

The Crittenden County Circuit Court denied Echols's petition, holding that the court lacked jurisdiction under habeas corpus provisions because Echols was no longer in physical state custody. The circuit court further ruled that Echols's 2011 Alford plea precluded relief under Act 1780 because entering a guilty plea resolved the legal question of perpetrator identity.

Echols appealed the denial to the Arkansas Supreme Court. In April 2024, the Supreme Court reversed the lower court decision in Echols v. State (2024 Ark. 61, 686 S.W.3d 790). Writing for the majority, Justice Karen R. Baker held that the plain language of Act 1780 applies to any "person convicted of a crime" who alleges actual innocence, rather than restricting relief strictly to incarcerated individuals in physical custody. The court further ruled that entering an Alford plea does not automatically disqualify a petitioner from seeking post-conviction DNA testing, as an Alford plea allows a defendant to accept a conviction while explicitly maintaining innocence. The Supreme Court remanded the case to the circuit court for further proceedings to evaluate whether the requested M-VAC testing met statutory criteria.

== Legal precedent and criminal justice advocacy ==
The 2024 Arkansas Supreme Court decision in Echols v. State established a significant legal precedent regarding post-conviction remedy access in Arkansas. By clarifying that Act 1780 extends to individuals no longer serving active prison terms, the ruling broadened access to forensic testing for individuals seeking to clear their records after release. Legal scholars and defense advocates noted that the ruling prevented a legal paradox wherein individuals released on time-served or plea agreements would be permanently barred from utilizing emerging DNA technologies to establish actual innocence.

Following his release, Echols published several books detailing his experience on death row, including his 2012 memoir Life After Death. He has remained an active speaker on prosecutorial ethics, death penalty reform, and the psychological effects of prolonged solitary confinement.

== Publications ==
- Echols, Damien (2012). Life After Death. Blue Rider Press. ISBN 978-1-101-59858-0.
- Echols, Damien; Davis, Lorri (2014). Yours for Eternity: A Love Story on Death Row. Blue Rider Press. ISBN 978-0-399-16619-8.
- Echols, Damien; Vedder, Eddie (2018). High Magick: A Guide to the Spiritual Practices That Saved My Life on Death Row. Sounds True. ISBN 978-1-68364-134-6.
- Echols, Damien; Greer, John Michael (2020). Angels and Archangels: A Magician's Guide. Sounds True. ISBN 978-1-68364-326-5.
- Echols, Damien; Davis, Lorri (2022). Ritual: An Essential Grimoire. Sounds True. ISBN 978-1-68364-820-8.

== Bibliography ==
- Leveritt, Mara (2002). Devil's Knot: The True Story of the West Memphis Three. Atria Books. ISBN 0-7434-1759-3.
- Newton, Michael (2004). The encyclopedia of unresolved crimes. Checkmark Books. p. 308. ISBN 0-8160-4980-7 – via Google Books.
- Mnookin, Jennifer L. (2005). "Reproducing a Trial: Evidence and Its Assessment in Paradise Lost". In Sarat, Austin; Douglas, Lawrence; Umphrey, Martha Merrill (eds.). Law on the screen. Stanford University Press. p. 153. ISBN 0-8047-5162-5 – via Google Books.
- Tost, Tony (2011). Johnny Cash's American Recordings. The Continuum International Publishing Group. p. 28. ISBN 978-1-4411-7461-1.
- Laycock, Joseph (2014). "27. The Trial of the West Memphis Three: Rival Visions of Evil". In Packer, Sharon; Pennington, Jody (eds.). A History of Evil in Popular Culture: What Hannibal Lecter, Stephen King, and Vampires Reveal About America. Vol. 1. Praeger. p. 327. ISBN 978-0-313-39770-7 – via Google Books.
