= Devil's Knot (film) =

2013 American biographical crime drama film

- Theatrical release poster
- Directed by: Atom Egoyan
- Screenplay by: Paul Harris Boardman; Scott Derrickson
- Based on: Devil's Knot: The True Story of the West Memphis Three by Mara Leveritt
- Produced by: Elizabeth Fowler; Richard Saperstein; Clark Peterson; Christopher Woodrow; Paul Harris Boardman
- Starring: Colin Firth; Reese Witherspoon; Dane DeHaan; Mireille Enos; Bruce Greenwood; Elias Koteas; Stephen Moyer; Alessandro Nivola; Amy Ryan
- Cinematography: Paul Sarossy
- Edited by: Susan Shipton
- Music by: Mychael Danna
- Production company: Worldview Entertainment
- Distributed by: Image Entertainment (United States); The Weinstein Company (International)
- Release dates: September 8, 2013 (TIFF); May 9, 2014 (theatrical, VOD)
- Running time: 114 minutes
- Country: United States
- Language: English
- Box office: $2 million

Devil's Knot is a 2013 American biographical crime drama film directed by Atom Egoyan and adapted from Mara Leveritt's 2002 book of the same name. The film is about the true story of three murdered children and three teenagers, known as the West Memphis Three, who were convicted of killing the three children during the Satanic panic. The teenagers were subsequently sentenced to death (Echols) and life imprisonment (Baldwin and Misskelley), before all were released after eighteen years.

The film was produced by Elizabeth Fowler, Richard Saperstein, Clark Peterson, Christopher Woodrow, and Paul Harris Boardman. The film stars Colin Firth, Reese Witherspoon, Dane DeHaan, Mireille Enos, Bruce Greenwood, Elias Koteas, Stephen Moyer, Alessandro Nivola, Amy Ryan, and Martin Henderson.

The film premiered at the 2013 Toronto International Film Festival on September 8. It had a limited release in Canadian theaters on January 24, 2014, and it was released in U.S. theaters and video on demand services on May 9, 2014.

== Plot ==
In 1993, in the working class and deeply religious community of West Memphis, Arkansas, three eight-year-old boys – Stevie Branch ( Steve Branch was the son of Steven and Pamela Branch, who divorced when he was an infant. His mother was awarded custody and later married Terry Hobbs), Christopher Byers, and Michael Moore – go missing from their neighbourhoods. After an extensive search, their bound and beaten bodies are found the next day. The community and the police department are convinced that the murders are the work of a satanic cult, due to the violent and sexual nature of the crime. A month later, three teenagers – Damien Echols, Jason Baldwin, and Jessie Misskelley Jr. – are arrested after Misskelley confesses to the murders following 12 hours of interrogation. They are taken to trial, where Baldwin and Misskelley are sentenced to life in prison, and Echols to death, all the while proclaiming their innocence.

In real life, in August 2011, after nearly 20 years in prison, Echols, Baldwin, and Misskelley were given a new trial and released after entering an Alford plea, under which they remain convicted felons. The boy and his mother who testified against the defendants recanted their statements; private investigator Ron Lax discovered a hair sample from the crime scene that resembled Terry Hobbs's DNA who was the step-father of one of the victims - Stevie Branch; the wife of John Mark Byers (mother of victim Christopher Byers) was found dead under "unsolved" circumstances; and Pam Hobbs continued to look for the truth about her son's murder.

== Cast ==
- Reese Witherspoon as Pamela Hobbs, mother of Stevie Branch
- Mireille Enos as Vicki Hutcheson, a new resident of West Memphis who plays a part in the boys' arrest
- Colin Firth as Ron Lax, private investigator
- Dane DeHaan as Chris Morgan, suspect who was detained for questioning
- Jet Jurgensmeyer as Stevie Branch, one of the victims
- Brandon Spink as Christopher Byers, one of the victims
- Paul Boardman Jr. as Michael Moore, one of the victims
- Kevin Durand as John Mark Byers, adoptive father of Christopher Byers
- Bruce Greenwood as Judge David Burnett, the original trial judge
- Stephen Moyer as John Fogelman, deputy prosecuting attorney
- Elias Koteas as Jerry Driver, Echols' parole officer
- Amy Ryan as Margaret Lax, wife of Ron Lax
- Alessandro Nivola as Terry Hobbs, stepfather of Stevie Branch
- Kristopher Higgins as Jessie Misskelley, Jr., one of the suspects
- James Hamrick as Damien Echols, one of the suspects
- Seth Meriwether as Jason Baldwin, one of the suspects
- Gary Grubbs as Dale Griffis, cult expert
- Martin Henderson as Brent Davis
- Collette Wolfe as Gloria Shettles, an investigator for Echols' defense team
- Kristoffer Polaha as Val Price, Echols' public defender
- Rex Linn as Inspector Gary Gitchell, the lead West Memphis investigator
- Matt Letscher as Paul Ford, Baldwin's defense attorney
- Michael Gladis as Dan Stidham, Misskelley's defense attorney
- Brian Howe as Detective McDonough
- Robert Baker as Police Lieutenant Bryn Ridge, the detective who discovered the missing boys' clothes
- Wilbur Fitzgerald as Tom

== Production ==
Colin Firth was confirmed to have joined the cast on May 21, 2012. More casting announcements were made on June 27, 2012. The film was produced by Elizabeth Fowler, Richard Saperstein, Clark Peterson, Christopher Woodrow, and Paul Harris Boardman, and the screenplay was written by Boardman and Scott Derrickson. The first image from the set was revealed on June 26, 2012.

=== Filming ===
Filming began on June 16, 2012, in Georgia, cities of Morrow and Atlanta. The courthouse scenes were filmed at the Bartow County Courthouse in Cartersville.

== Release ==
The world premiere was held at the 2013 Toronto International Film Festival on September 8, 2013. Image Entertainment purchased the distribution rights after its premiere. The film was released in Canadian theaters (both English and French) on January 24, 2014.

== Reception ==
Devil's Knot holds a 26% approval rating on the review aggregator website Rotten Tomatoes, based on 96 reviews, with an average rating of 4.7/10. The general consensus states: "Devil's Knot covers fact-based ground that's already been well-traveled with multiple (and far more compelling) documentaries." On Metacritic, the film has a 42/100 rating based on 24 critics, indicating "mixed or average" reviews.

== See also ==
These four documentaries center on the West Memphis Three:

- Paradise Lost: The Child Murders at Robin Hood Hills – 1996 American documentary film
- Paradise Lost 2: Revelations – 2000 American documentary film
- Paradise Lost 3: Purgatory – 2011 American documentary film
- West of Memphis – 2012 New Zealand-American documentary film
