= Austin Film Critics Association Awards 2014 =

Annual US film awards ceremony

10th AFCA Awards

Best Film:
Boyhood

The 10th Austin Film Critics Association Awards, honoring the best in filmmaking for 2014, were announced on December 17, 2014.

== Top 10 Films ==
1. Boyhood
2. Whiplash
3. The Grand Budapest Hotel
4. Birdman
5. Snowpiercer
6. Nightcrawler
7. Selma
8. The Imitation Game
9. Inherent Vice
10. Gone Girl

== Winners ==
- Best Film:
  - Boyhood
- Best Director:
  - Richard Linklater – Boyhood
- Best Actor:
  - Jake Gyllenhaal – Nightcrawler
- Best Actress:
  - Rosamund Pike – Gone Girl
- Best Supporting Actor:
  - J. K. Simmons – Whiplash
- Best Supporting Actress:
  - Patricia Arquette – Boyhood
- Best Original Screenplay:
  - Nightcrawler – Dan Gilroy
- Best Adapted Screenplay:
  - Gone Girl – Gillian Flynn
- Best Cinematography:
  - Birdman – Emmanuel Lubezki
- Best Original Score:
  - Birdman – Antonio Sánchez
- Best Foreign Language Film:
  - Force Majeure • Sweden
- Best Documentary:
  - Citizenfour
- Best Animated Feature:
  - The LEGO Movie
- Best First Film:
  - Dan Gilroy – Nightcrawler
- Breakthrough Artist Award:
  - Jennifer Kent – The Babadook
- Austin Film Award:
  - Boyhood – Richard Linklater
- Special Honorary Award:
  - Gary Poulter for his outstanding performance in Joe
