= Worldview Entertainment =

American motion picture company

- Company type: Private
- Industry: Film
- Founded: 2007; 19 years ago
- Founder: Christopher Woodrow
- Defunct: 2015; 11 years ago
- Successor: Vendian Entertainment
- Headquarters: 1384 Broadway; 25th Floor; New York, NY 10018
- Website: worldviewent.com

Worldview Entertainment was an American motion picture finance and production company. The company produced 23 films, including Birdman, which won four Oscars, including Best Picture.

== History ==
Worldview Entertainment was founded in 2007 by Christopher Woodrow, who served as chairman and CEO until 2014. Maria Cestone, daughter of New Jersey businessman Ralph M. Cestone, became a co-founding partner and significant investor in the company in 2008. Sarah Johnson, daughter of Charles B. Johnson, former chairman and CEO of Franklin Templeton Investments, became a partner and major investor in the company in 2011. The company was represented by CAA and occupied the penthouse of the Lefcourt Normandie Building in Midtown Manhattan.

=== Early 2010s ===
Worldview premiered Killer Joe in September 2011 at the Venice Film Festival before the film made its North American debut at the Toronto International Film Festival, where it was sold domestically to LD Entertainment.

Worldview's 2013 slate consisted of three films that premiered in May at the Cannes Film Festival, including Blood Ties, which was sold domestically to Lionsgate and released through its Roadside Attractions banner; and The Immigrant, which was nominated for the Palme d'Or and sold domestically to The Weinstein Company. During the festival, the company announced the closing of a $30 million multi-year revolving credit facility with Comerica Bank to provide financing for its films.

Worldview premiered two films in August 2013 at the Venice Film Festival, including Joe, which was sold domestically to Lionsgate and released by Roadside Attractions. The company premiered six films in September at the Toronto International Film Festival, including Devil's Knot, which was sold domestically to Image Entertainment; and The Green Inferno, which was sold domestically to Open Road Films and later released by Blumhouse Productions' multi-platform label BH Tilt and High Top Releasing. During the festival, Worldview announced plans to move into domestic film distribution.

Worldview's 2014 slate consisted of two films that premiered in January at the Sundance Film Festival, including Wish I Was Here, which was sold domestically to Focus Features. The company announced a multi-year, multi-picture co-financing deal in May with The Weinstein Company and had a presence at the Cannes Film Festival, where it premiered The Search, which was nominated for the Palme d'Or. During the festival, Worldview was a presenting sponsor of amfAR's 21st annual Cinema Against AIDS Gala at the Hôtel du Cap.

Worldview premiered two films in August 2014 at the Venice Film Festival, including Birdman, with Fox Searchlight and New Regency. The film made its North American debut in September at the Telluride Film Festival before screening in early October at the New York Film Festival. Worldview's most successful film was released on October 17, 2014, and grossed $103 million in global box office revenue. Birdman received seven Golden Globe Award nominations and won two Golden Globe Awards on January 11, 2015, including Best Actor in a Motion Picture and Best Screenplay. The film went on to receive nine Academy Award nominations and won four Oscars on February 22, 2015, including Best Picture, Best Director, Best Original Screenplay, and Best Cinematography.

=== Demise ===
Woodrow departed the company in June 2014. Worldview filed a lawsuit against him in October 2014, alleging improprieties involving expenses he had submitted to the company. In response, Woodrow sued Worldview for defamation and to reclaim unpaid wages and personal property. The company ceased operations in March 2015. Johnson also filed a lawsuit against Worldview in March 2015, alleging she had been fraudulently induced to invest in the company, which was dismissed in March 2017.

== Filmography ==
Year	Title	Role	Notes
2009	Handsome Harry	Producer	Directed by Bette Gordon; written by Nicolas T. Proferes; starring Jamey Sheridan, Steve Buscemi, Mariann Mayberry, Aidan Quinn, John Savage, Campbell Scott, Titus Welliver, and Karen Young
2011	Killer Joe	Executive Producer	Directed by William Friedkin; written by Tracy Letts; starring Matthew McConaughey, Emile Hirsch, Juno Temple, Gina Gershon, and Thomas Haden Church; based on the 1993 play of the same name by Tracy Letts
2012	30 Beats	Producer	Directed, written, and produced by Alexis Lloyd; starring Ingeborga Dapkunaite, Jason Day, Vahina Giocante, Paz de la Huerta, Justin Kirk, Ben Levin, Lee Pace, Condola Rashad, Thomas Sadoski, and Jennifer Tilly
2013	Ass Backwards	Producer	Directed by Chris Nelson; written by June Diane Raphael and Casey Wilson; starring June Diane Raphael, Casey Wilson, Jon Cryer, Vincent D'Onofrio, Brian Geraghty, Bob Odenkirk, Paul Scheer, and Alicia Silverstone
2013	Blood Ties	Financier – Producer	Directed by Guillaume Canet; written by Guillaume Canet and James Gray; a co-production with Wild Bunch; starring Clive Owen, Billy Crudup, Marion Cotillard, Mila Kunis, Zoe Saldana, Matthias Schoenaerts, and James Caan; a remake of the 2008 French thriller Les liens du sang based on the 1999 French book Deux frères: flic & truand by Bruno and Michel Papet
2013	Devil's Knot	Financier – Producer	Directed by Atom Egoyan; written by Paul Harris Boardman and Scott Derrickson; starring Colin Firth and Reese Witherspoon; the story of the West Memphis Three based on the 2002 book of the same name by Mara Leveritt
2013	The Green Inferno	Financier – Producer	Directed by Eli Roth; written by Eli Roth and Guillermo Amoedo; starring Lorenza Izzo, Ariel Levy, Daryl Sabara, Kirby Bliss Blanton, Sky Ferreira, Magda Apanowicz, Nicolás Martinez, Aaron Burns, Ignacia Allamand, Ramón Llao, and Richard Burgi; inspired by and serves as an homage to Italian cannibal films of the late 1970s and early 1980s "cannibal boom", particularly Cannibal Holocaust, which features a film-within-a-film titled The Green Inferno
2013	The Immigrant	Financier – Producer	Directed by James Gray; written by James Gray and Richard Menello; a co-production with Wild Bunch; starring Marion Cotillard, Joaquin Phoenix, and Jeremy Renner; nominated for the Palme d'Or at the 2013 Cannes Film Festival
2013	Jimmy P.	Financier – Distribution Rights	Directed by Arnaud Desplechin; written by Arnaud Desplechin, Kent Jones, and Julie Peyr; a co-production with Wild Bunch; starring Benicio del Toro, Mathieu Amalric, and Misty Upham; primarily based on the 1951 book Reality and Dream: Psychotherapy of a Plains Indian by George Devereux; nominated for the Palme d'Or at the 2013 Cannes Film Festival
2013	Joe	Financier – Producer	Directed by David Gordon Green; written by Gary Hawkins; starring Nicolas Cage, Tye Sheridan, and Gary Poulter; based on the 1991 book of the same name by Larry Brown
2013	The Sacrament	Financier – Producer	Directed and written by Ti West; presented and produced by Eli Roth; starring Joe Swanberg, AJ Bowen, Kentucker Audley, Amy Seimetz, and Gene Jones; inspired by the real-life events of the 1978 Jonestown Massacre
2013	The Square	Executive Producer	Directed by Jehane Noujaim; nominated for an Academy Award for Best Documentary Feature; won three Emmy Awards, including Outstanding Cinematography for a Nonfiction Program, Outstanding Directing for a Documentary/Nonfiction Program, and Outstanding Picture Editing for a Nonfiction Program
2013	Welcome to the Punch	Executive Producer	Directed and written by Eran Creevy; executive produced by Ridley Scott; starring James McAvoy, Mark Strong, and Andrea Riseborough
2014	Birdman	Executive Producer	Directed by Alejandro G. Iñárritu; written by Alejandro G. Iñárritu, Nicolás Giacobone, Alexander Dinelaris Jr., and Armando Bó; starring Michael Keaton, Zach Galifianakis, Edward Norton, Andrea Riseborough, Amy Ryan, Emma Stone, and Naomi Watts; won two Golden Globe Awards, including Best Actor in a Motion Picture and Best Screenplay; won four Academy Awards, including Best Picture, Best Director, Best Original Screenplay, and Best Cinematography
2014	Child 44	Executive Producer	Directed by Daniel Espinosa; written by Richard Price; produced by Ridley Scott; starring Tom Hardy, Gary Oldman, Noomi Rapace, Joel Kinnaman, Paddy Considine, Jason Clarke, and Vincent Cassel; based on the 2008 book of the same name by Tom Rob Smith
2014	Manglehorn	Financier – Producer	Directed by David Gordon Green; written by Paul Logan; starring Al Pacino, Holly Hunter, Harmony Korine, and Chris Messina
2014	The Search	Financier – Distribution Rights	Directed, written, and produced by Michel Hazanavicius; a co-production with Wild Bunch; starring Bérénice Bejo and Annette Bening; inspired by the Fred Zinnemann-directed post-Holocaust drama also called The Search, which won an Academy Award for Best Story; nominated for the Palme d'Or at the 2014 Cannes Film Festival
2014	Song One	Financier – Producer	Directed and written by Kate Barker-Froyland; produced by Marc Platt and Jonathan Demme; starring Anne Hathaway, Johnny Flynn, Ben Rosenfield, and Mary Steenburgen
2014	Wish I Was Here	Executive Producer	Directed by Zach Braff; written by Adam Braff and Zach Braff; starring Zach Braff, Donald Faison, Josh Gad, Pierce Gagnon, Ashley Greene, Kate Hudson, Joey King, Jim Parsons, and Mandy Patinkin
2015	Strangerland	Executive Producer	Directed by Kim Farrant; written by Fiona Seres and Michael Kinirons; starring Nicole Kidman, Joseph Fiennes, Hugo Weaving, Lisa Flanagan, Meyne Wyatt, Maddison Brown, and Nicholas Hamilton
2016	Rules Don't Apply	Financier – Producer	Directed, written, and produced by Warren Beatty; starring Warren Beatty, Annette Bening, Matthew Broderick, Lily Collins, and Alden Ehrenreich; based on the life of businessman and film producer Howard Hughes; nominated for a Golden Globe Award for Best Actress in a Motion Picture
2016	Triple 9	Financier – Producer	Directed by John Hillcoat; written by Matt Cook; starring Casey Affleck, Chiwetel Ejiofor, Anthony Mackie, Aaron Paul, Clifton Collins Jr., Norman Reedus, Teresa Palmer, Michael K. Williams, Gal Gadot, Woody Harrelson, and Kate Winslet
2017	Tulip Fever	Executive Producer	Directed by Justin Chadwick; written by Deborah Moggach and Tom Stoppard; produced by Harvey Weinstein; starring Alicia Vikander, Dane DeHaan, Jack O'Connell, Holliday Grainger, Tom Hollander, Matthew Morrison, Kevin McKidd, Douglas Hodge, Joanna Scanlan, Zach Galifianakis, Judi Dench, and Christoph Waltz; adapted from the 1999 book of the same name by Deborah Moggach
