= West of Memphis =

2012 New Zealand-American documentary film

- Theatrical release poster
- Directed by: Amy Berg
- Written by: Amy Berg; Billy McMillin
- Produced by: Amy Berg; Fran Walsh; Peter Jackson; Damien Echols; Lorri Davis
- Starring: The West Memphis Three; (Damien Echols, Jason Baldwin, &; Jessie Misskelley); Lorri Davis; Eddie Vedder; Peter Jackson
- Cinematography: Maryse Alberti; Ronan Killeen
- Edited by: Billy McMillin
- Music by: Nick Cave; Warren Ellis
- Production companies: WingNut Films; Disarming Films
- Distributed by: Sony Pictures Classics
- Release dates: 21 January 2012 (Sundance); 28 December 2012
- Running time: 147 minutes
- Countries: New Zealand; United States
- Language: English
- Box office: $310,154

West of Memphis is a 2012 documentary film about the West Memphis Three that was directed and co-written by Amy Berg, and produced by Berg, Fran Walsh and Peter Jackson, and Damien Echols (who is the primary subject of the film) and his wife, Lorri Davis. It was released in the US by Sony Pictures Classics to critical acclaim, and received a nomination for Best Documentary Screenplay from the Writers Guild of America.

== Background ==
As with Joe Berlinger and Bruce Sinofsky's Paradise Lost documentary trilogy (Paradise Lost: The Child Murders at Robin Hood Hills (1996), Paradise Lost 2: Revelations (2000), and Paradise Lost 3: Purgatory (2011)), West of Memphis is about the West Memphis Three case, in which Damien Echols, Jason Baldwin, and Jessie Misskelley, three teenagers from West Memphis, Arkansas, were convicted in 1994 of the 1993 murders of three 8-year-old boys from the same town and imprisoned for more than 18 years. From the time the first Paradise Lost film was released in 1996, a growing number of supporters began to protest the innocence of the West Memphis Three.

Much like the Paradise Lost films, West of Memphis chronicles the history of the imprisoned men all the way up to their release in 2011 through interviews conducted with lawyers, judges, journalists, family members, witnesses, and the West Memphis Three themselves. West of Memphis focuses on Terry Hobbs, stepfather of Stevie Branch (one of the murder victims), as a potential suspect, due to physical evidence linking him to the crime, a history of violent behavior, and his lack of an alibi for the time the murders were committed, as well as damaging statements made by his ex-wife, former neighbors, and his own nephew, who claims Hobbs confessed to him. The film reveals that, inexplicably, Hobbs was not interviewed by police at the time of the murders.

== Release ==
West of Memphis premiered at the Sundance Film Festival on January 21, 2012, at the Deauville American Film Festival on September 2, 2012, and at the Toronto International Film Festival on September 8, 2012. As Paradise Lost 3: Purgatory premiered on HBO in January 2012, there were two documentary films on the subject released within a year of each other.

== Critical reception ==
Writing in The Wall Street Journal, film critic Joe Morgenstern described West of Memphis as "a devastating account of police incompetence, civic hysteria and prosecutorial behavior that was totally at odds with a vastly persuasive body of evidence uncovered in a privately funded investigation". He wrote that director Amy Berg "has a dramatist's eye for what was irretrievably lost — the innocent lives of the children, plus 18 years of three other innocent lives. And she saw, equally well, what was there to be gained: dramatic new insights into an inexorable progression from random arrests through groundless supposition, fevered conjecture and flagrant perjury to official disgrace in a supposedly airtight case."

Film critic Philip French of The Observer called West of Memphis "riveting", and a "shocking indictment of the American criminal justice system and a tribute to the dedication of selfless civil rights lawyers and their supporters from all over the world".

Owen Gleiberman of Entertainment Weekly gave the film an "A−" and wrote that it "casts a hypnotic spell all its own. It artfully sketches out the events for anyone who's coming in cold, but basically, its strategy is to take what we already know and go deeper. [...] West of Memphis goes after another possible suspect, Terry Hobbs, who was stepfather to one of the victims and who has denied any involvement. In doing so, the film reframes the story's terrible darkness, even if it can't give us the closure we hunger for."

Roger Ebert of Chicago Sun-Times gave the film a perfect four star rating, writing: "Do we need a fourth film? Yes, I think we do. If you only see one of them, this is the one to choose, because it has the benefit of hindsight."

== See also ==
- Devil's Knot – 2013 American biographical crime drama film
- Devil's Knot: The True Story of the West Memphis Three – 2002 true crime book by Mara Leveritt
