= WM3 (disambiguation) =

West Memphis Three is three men who – while teenagers – were tried and convicted, in 1994, of the 1993 murders of three boys in West Memphis, Arkansas.

WM3 may also refer to:

- WrestleMania III, the third annual WrestleMania professional wrestling pay-per-view event
- WM3 Pro Cycling, a women's professional cycling team
