= Dirty Work (Brown novel) =

1989 novel by Larry Brown

- 1st ed. dustjacket (hardcover)
- Author: Larry Brown
- Cover artist: Glennray Tutor
- Language: English
- Genre: Fiction
- Publisher: Algonquin Books
- Publication place: USA
- Awards: Mississippi Institute of Arts and Letters Award
- ISBN: 9780945575207
- OCLC: 19388439

Dirty Work is the debut novel of American writer Larry Brown. It was originally published in 1989 by Algonquin Books, and went on to receive the Mississippi Institute of Arts and Letters Award for fiction. USA Today included it on their annual list of best works of fiction published during the year (1989).

== Background ==
Before writing and publishing his first novel Dirty Work in 1989, Brown had written five “discarded” novels, one of which he had set fire to and destroyed, according to his wife Mary Annie Brown:

"I watched him burn one novel," she said. "We had one of our worst fights over his writing when he decided that Dirty Work was no good and he was burning it. That was one time I did put my foot down and told him he had worked too hard, I had worked too hard, and he would not burn that book."

Although it’s sometimes called a “Vietnam War novel,” Brown stated that his intention in writing Dirty Work was:

“to write a book that was more about the aftermath of the war and the damage that was inflicted on two soldiers more than the actual war itself. I wanted to show not so much what happened to them then, but what is happening to them now.”

Brown graduated from high school in 1969 and joined the Marine Corps in 1970 —during the Vietnam War— but was neither deployed, nor wounded. So after Dirty Work was published, he was often asked how he wrote a book from the viewpoint of disabled veterans. In an interview with Kay Bonetti, Brown said that

“The guys in Dirty Work are actually based on some of the Marines that I met in the early ’70’s in Philadelphia where I was stationed–guys who were in wheelchairs, who had lost their arms and legs and had made that great sacrifice too. . . The novel is all a work of fiction that comes from my being so impressed by these guys that I met.”

Brown’s biographer states that he wanted “to write about the after-effects of the war … largely because his father was deeply damaged by his four years in the infantry during World War II.” Besides his father, Knox Brown, recounting his own painful memories serving in World War II, Brown remembered listening to veterans who had served in Vietnam telling their own stories in the bars Brown went to while he was in the service.

So at some point, Brown admits: “I knew everything I needed to know about the weapons from my training, and I’d talked to enough marines who were in combat to find out what it was like over there. That’s all you need. You just invent the rest.”

Brown later revisited the plight of a damaged veteran — and its long term effects on family, friends, and community — through the character of Virgil Davis in his 1996 novel Father and Son.

== Plot summary ==
The novel takes place over the course of a day and a night —a period of less than two days— in a VA hospital. Walter James, a white veteran of the Vietnam War, has just been admitted. His face was completely reconstructed after he suffered severe wounds. As a result of a fragment of bullet embedded in his brain, James also suffers blackouts and dizziness.

He meets Braiden Chaney, a black man who lost both of his arms and legs from gunfire in the Vietnam War. He has been in the VA hospital for 22 years. The novel is structured in a stream of consciousness style, much of it taking place within Braiden's mind. He constructs elaborate fantasies, most of which involve his being a king in Africa, to escape the plight of his physical state.

Most of the novel consists of dialogue between the two men. They tell each other their respective stories, mostly during the course of one night, while they drink beer and smoke pot that Braiden's sister has smuggled into the hospital for him.

== Themes ==
According to Brown’s biographer, some of Dirty Work’s themes would include: (1) its antiwar stance; (2) the outlook of race relations; and (3) the meaning of “genuine Christianity.”

On a certain level, Dirty Work can perhaps be viewed as a theodicy in its attempts to explain the paradox of evil in a world created by an omnipotent God. Braiden has several conversations with Jesus during the novel. The reader is left to determine whether they are fantasies or real conversations. When Brown himself was asked about this, he replied: “Some people get upset about that scene. They want to know whether the scene is actually occurring. Is Jesus actually there, or is it a vision, or something in Braiden’s mind? To tell you the truth, I don’t know.”

Theology Today’s review of the novel states that:

“The spirituality of these Dirty Work vets is mature, self-critical, tempered by continuing struggle, purified by tears of compassion. It evidences that rare gift, the courage to face the full truth about life and love (what James Baldwin called life’s ‘terrible laws’) in spite of the ever-present temptations of culture and religion to ignore such truth.”

The plot of the novel borrows from One Flew Over the Cuckoo's Nest, which is referred to in the novel. Braiden, along with his sister, eventually convince Walter to kill him. He has wanted to end his life for years. The novel concludes with this event, and Walter reflects, "I knew that somewhere Jesus wept."
