= Steve Yarbrough =

Steve Yarbrough may refer to:

- Steve Yarbrough (writer) (born 1956), novelist and short story writer
- Steve Yarbrough (politician), Republican politician in Arizona
- Steve Yarbrough (Ohio politician), Republican politician in Ohio
