= Steve Bryles =

American politician and businessman (1957–2012)

Member of the Arkansas Senate from the 15th district
- In office 2001–2011
- Preceded by: Mike Bearden
- Succeeded by: David Burnett

Personal details
- Born: September 17, 1957 Piggott, Arkansas, U.S.
- Died: December 28, 2012 (aged 55)
- Party: Democratic
- Spouse: Pamela
- Education: University of Arkansas

Steven Mark Bryles (September 17, 1957 - December 28, 2012) was an American politician and businessman. He was a member of the Arkansas Senate from 2001 to 2011, and a member of the Democratic Party.

== Political career ==
Steve Bryles represented Senate District 15, which includes Mississippi and Poinsett counties, in the Arkansas Senate 2001-2011.

Elected in 2000 in his first venture into politics, Bryles defeated state representative Joe Harris. His committee memberships included Public Education; Agriculture, Economic Development and Forestry; Joint Budget, and Legislative Council. Bryles worked to establish the Great River Economic Development Foundation.

In 2011, Bryles was appointed deputy director of the Arkansas Livestock and Poultry Commission and then became director of the commission.

== Personal life ==
Born in Piggott, Arkansas, Bryles attended public schools in Star City, Osceola and Blytheville and majored in agricultural economics at the University of Arkansas at Fayetteville. He had more than 27 years of experience in the cotton industry. A member of the First Presbyterian Church in Blytheville, Bryles was married to Pamela and had one son and two daughters.

Bryles died of cancer in 2012 aged 55.
