= The Search (2014 film) =

2014 film by Michel Hazanavicius

- Film poster
- Directed by: Michel Hazanavicius
- Written by: Michel Hazanavicius
- Produced by: Michel Hazanavicius; Thomas Langmann
- Starring: Bérénice Bejo; Annette Bening
- Cinematography: Guillaume Schiffman
- Edited by: Anne-Sophie Bion; Michel Hazanavicius
- Music by: Selim Azzazi
- Production companies: La Petite Reine; Worldview Entertainment; La Classe Américaine; Georgian Film Investment Group; Sarke Studio
- Distributed by: Warner Bros. Pictures
- Release dates: 21 May 2014 (Cannes); 26 November 2014 (France)
- Running time: 160 minutes
- Countries: France; Georgia
- Languages: English; French; Russian; Chechen
- Box office: $600,000

The Search is a 2014 drama film written and directed by Michel Hazanavicius and produced by Hazanavicius and Thomas Langmann. The film was inspired by the Oscar-winning post-Holocaust drama also called The Search, directed by Fred Zinnemann, in which a compassionate westerner helps a lost child find what is left of his family amidst the chaotic flood of post-war civilian refugees. In the 1948 film, the backdrop is post-war Berlin; The Search (2014) takes place in the "front lines of the Russian invasion of Chechnya" during the first year of the Second Chechen War (1999–2009). The Search was selected to compete for the Palme d'Or in the main competition section at the 2014 Cannes Film Festival.

== Plot ==
The film begins and ends on 16 October 1999, with 20-year-old Kolia, (Maksim Emelyanov), a Russian Army recruit, recording and narrating with a handheld video camera, as young, drunken Russian soldiers taunt, terrorize, and finally execute a civilian Chechen couple in front of their teenage daughter Raissa (Zukhra Duishvili). Kolia's story is one of four personal narratives that unfold against the backdrop of the ruins of a village in Chechnya, the flood of civilian refugees from the village, and a family partially reunited. Kolia, a pot-smoking guitar player in Perm, 2,300 kilometers from the Chechen border, is taken into custody for possession of drugs and drafted into army service. As a new recruit, he undergoes a brutal transformation from an innocent youth into a "dehumanized killing machine." When Kolia's fellow soldiers kill the Chechen couple, the couple's nine-year-old son, Hadji (Abdul Khalim Mamutsiev) hides and watches and when it is safe, he is able to carry his infant brother to relative safety. The trauma of his parents' death renders him mute. He is helped along the way to the refugee camp by other Chechen refugees and eventually, he is befriended by Carole (Bérénice Bejo), a French-born, Chechnya-based NGO worker. Carole, who works as a researcher and representative of the Human Rights Committee of the European Union, helps Hadji regain his ability to speak. Hadji's elder sister Raïssa searches for both brothers. Carol interviews Helen (Annette Bening), a Red Cross worker, and places hope in the International response to the Second Chechen War to help the centuries-old struggle of the Chechen people. Raissa, reunited with her baby brother, escapes once again from the village with the help of other Chechen refugees. She has to leave without Hadji, against her will, because of the Russian military forces' aerial bombing. Raissa helps Helen at the International Red Cross orphanage. Both Helen and Carole are discouraged when the United Nations Commission of Human Rights report of April 2000 does not declare the situation in Chechnya a humanitarian disaster. Carole delivers her report to the United Nations but soon realizes that not many of the participants are listening. With the help of Carole and Helen, Hadji is reunited with his siblings. The film ends at the beginning, with Kolia's filming of the attack on Hadji's family.

== Cast ==
- Bérénice Bejo as Carole
- Annette Bening as Helen
- Maksim Emelyanov as Kolia
- Abdul Khalim Mamutsiev as Hadji
- Zukhra Duishvili as Raïssa
- Lela Bagakashvili as Elina
- Yuriy Tsurilo as The Colonel
- Anton Dolgov as Soldier
- Mamuka Matchitidze as Father
- Rusudan Pareulidze as Mother

== Locations ==
Much of the filming took place alongside the Caucasus Mountains in Georgia, depicting places like a village near Grozny, NGO offices in the city of Nazran in nearby Ingushetia, a federal subject of Russia that borders Chechnya, the city of Perm, Russia. Film critic Justin Chang praised the work of set designer, Emile Ghigo, who used buildings, places, and geographical features in the "mountainous, battle-scarred landscape" of Georgia that were similar to those in Chechnya including buildings destroyed by bombs, army barracks and refugee camps. McCarthy also cited Ghigo's contribution with his "well-chosen locations, the crowded city scenes, detention centers and army barracks reek with the feel, sounds and discomfort of humanity pressed into unnaturally tight quarters."

== Cinematography ==
Critics praised the work of Guillaume Schiffman, the French cinematographer, who also worked with director Michel Hazanavicius on films such as The Artist. McCarthy described how they used "muted but still sharply defined colors, as well as with what appear to be mostly handheld cameras, to achieve a somber yet vitally immediate look."

== Reception ==
On film review aggregator Rotten Tomatoes, critics gave The Search a rating of 21%, based on 19 reviews, with a weighted average score of 4.71/10. On Metacritic, the film has a score of 37 out of 100, based on 8 critics, indicating "generally unfavorable reviews". The Guardian journalist Peter Bradshaw argued that Hazanavicius' attempt at "Old Hollywood big-hearted sincerity" devolved from an earnest rejection of violence against all actors in a war, into naive sentimentality. Bradshaw did commend Hazanavicius for reminding the west and the European Union of their lack of concern and inaction when Boris Yeltsin attacked Chechenya. Chang also praised all the actors for turning "in fine work within fairly circumscribed parameters;" he described the production as "first-rate" and the sound work as excellent. However, he called the film a "grueling, lumbering, two-and-a-half-hour humanitarian tract that all but collapses under the weight of its own moral indignation" with an approach that was "ultimately hectoring" and "didactic." The Globe and Mail critic Liam Lacey described the film as "long, unoriginal and heavy-handed", a direct opposite of Hazanavicius' Oscar-winning silent movie comedy, The Artist. Critic Todd McCarthy observed that the Chechen faction to which the Russians were responding — referred to as rebels, terrorists or invaders elsewhere — are conspicuously absent from the film's mosaic. McCarthy remarked that, "it might have behooved [the film maker] to have everyday Chechens as well as the foreigners reference them, positively or negatively, to at least make them a presence and a factor in the tragedy."

== Other uses ==
In 2015, a fictional sequence taken from the film was presented as a real video of a massacre taken by a Russian soldier during the 1999 Chechnya war. In 2022, the same fictional sequence was posted on social networks, this time supposedly as an example of a massacre committed by Ukrainian soldiers during the Chechen war (even though - paradoxically - the Ukrainian army never fought in Chechnya).
