= Paradise Lost 2: Revelations =

2000 American documentary film

- DVD cover
- Directed by: Joe Berlinger; Bruce Sinofsky
- Produced by: Joe Berlinger; Bruce Sinofsky
- Starring: Jessie Misskelley Jr. Damien Echols; Jason Baldwin; John Mark Byers
- Cinematography: Bob Richman
- Edited by: M. Watanabe Milmore
- Music by: Metallica
- Distributed by: Home Box Office (HBO)
- Release date: March 13, 2000
- Running time: 130 minutes
- Country: United States
- Language: English

Paradise Lost 2: Revelations is a 2000 American documentary film directed and produced by Joe Berlinger and Bruce Sinofsky, and the sequel to their 1996 film Paradise Lost: The Child Murders at Robin Hood Hills, about the trials of the West Memphis Three, three teenage boys accused of the May 1993 murders and sexual mutilation of three prepubescent boys as a part of an alleged satanic ritual in West Memphis, Arkansas.

Revelations takes place five years after the events depicted in the first film, as Damien Echols, one of the West Memphis Three, who were all named as guilty of the murders in 1994, appeals his lethal injection sentence. It mostly focuses on John Mark Byers, the father of one of the victims who has grown increasingly obsessed with the West Memphis Three, and on a support group who is convinced that the three are innocent. The film was nominated for a Primetime Emmy Award for Outstanding Nonfiction Special, and was later followed by a third film, Paradise Lost 3: Purgatory, in 2011.

== Description ==
In Paradise Lost 2, Bruce Sinofsky and Joe Berlinger visit support groups for Damien Echols, sentenced to lethal injection in the first film, and revisit John Mark Byers, who is facing gossip about his possible involvement with the murder of his son. Echols is appealing his sentence and his defense attorney notices what he believes to be bite marks in a photograph of the face of one of the victims; the prosecution argues that the marks are from a belt buckle and not teeth.

The three boys convicted in the first film are all tested and do not match the alleged "bite marks" on the victim. The support groups for Echols want Byers to have his bitemark compared to the one on the photo, but Byers has had false teeth since four years after his son's murder. Byers gave the Defense copies of his dental records and they didn't match the "bite marks" either. Byers takes a polygraph to prove his innocence but is on a variety of medications that could affect the outcome of the test, including Xanax and Haldol; he passes the polygraph test.

== Production ==
Metallica allowed their music to be used in the movie. Another sequel was produced: Paradise Lost 3: Purgatory, which was initially scheduled for release in autumn 2011, but was delayed until January 2012 after the West Memphis Three were released from prison while the film was in post-production, requiring new material to be added, and West of Memphis, which was released at the Sundance Film Festival days after Paradise Lost 3 aired on HBO and, based on new evidence, implicates a new suspect in the murders at Robin Hood Hills.
