= Father and Son (Brown novel) =

1996 novel by Larry Brown

- original dust jacket
- Author: Larry Brown (Author)
- Language: English
- Genre: Novel
- Publisher: Algonquin Books
- Publication date: 1996
- Publication place: USA
- Media type: Print (hardback & paperback)
- Pages: 360
- ISBN: 9781565120143

Father and Son (1996) is a novel by American writer Larry Brown. It received the 1997 Southern Book Award for Fiction. Brown's previous novel Joe (1991) also received the same award, making him the first two-time winner.

== Brief synopsis ==
Glen Davis serves 3 years in Parchman Prison for killing a child in a drunk driving incident. After serving his time, Glen returns to his Mississippi hometown where he terrorizes, or seeks vengeance on, those he believes have wronged him in the past.

== Principal characters ==
- Glen Davis — a convict just released from the state penitentiary
- Randolph "Puppy" Davis — Glen's younger brother
- Virgil Davis — Glen's and Puppy's father, prisoner of war in Bataan during World War II
- Mary Blanchard — Virgil's lover
- Bobby Blanchard — the sheriff, Mary's son
- Jewel — the mother of Glen's young son

== Background ==
At the time of its publication in 1996, Father and Son was Brown's third published novel and his sixth book to have appeared over the previous eight years. It followed after his first two published novels: Dirty Work (1988) and Joe (1992); two story collections: Facing the Music (1988) and Big Bad Love (1991); and the "short haunting memoir" On Fire (1993). (Note: As Carol Dale Short explains: "On Fire is Brown's memoir about the seventeen years he spent as a fireman and emergency rescue technician in the hometown he shares with William Faulkner: Oxford, Mississippi")

Brown wrote about how he first conceptualized the setting of the novel:

"When I wrote my novel Father and Son, people wondered why I set it back in the sixties. The answer to that is very simple. When I wrote the first scene, where Glen Davis and his brother Puppy are driving back into town, I didn't see the Square I see now [...] I saw that old Oxford [...] and I knew that they had driven in one hot Saturday afternoon back during my childhood, and I remember the way things were."

== Setting and themes ==
Father and Son is set in 1968 in and around Oxford, Mississippi including nearby Tula and Paris. Like he did in the fiction he published before Father and Son, Brown uses:

"the basic settings, speech, and themes of traditional Southern fiction — the tangled loyalties of family and community, the pressures of history, soul-grinding poverty and economic struggle, and Southerners' visceral bond with the land..."

== Reception and legacy ==
At the time of its publication, Publishers Weekly gave Father and Son unqualified praise calling it Brown's "most wise, humane and haunting work to date." Kirkus Reviews called it a "riveting tale of an unforgiving and cruel world."

Anthony Quinn, in his review for The New York Times, found the book to be a "commendable novel short of being a flat-out success," but acknowledged that Brown had established a distinct voice and vision of his own: "The model is William Faulkner, but his influence has been absorbed and transcended: the cumulative effect of this blue-collar tragedy proves it the work of a writer absolutely confident of his own voice." Writing in The Virginian-Pilot, Eugene McAvoy muted his praise of the novel, calling it a "competent, though imperfect, novel" but it is "testimony to a daring voice in American letters."

In the decades since Father and Son came out, it has been recognized by some as a watershed moment for Brown, "almost Shakespearean in its dramatic scope and the larger questions it raises." (Note: Carroll Dale Short writes that: "Like Pete Dexter's Pulitzer Prize-winning novel Paris Trout (1988), it moves readers to look past the conventional concept of law and order and consider the role of each individual in a community that is openly threatened by such a criminal.") More than 25 years after the novel first appeared in 1996, popular crime-writer Ace Atkins was asked about the scenes of violence in Father and Son. Atkins replied,

"That's great Southern noir. It's grotesque, it's violent, it's absurd. I think that Larry brought back some of those darker elements to Southern literature that maybe had been eroded since the time of Flannery O'Connor and Faulkner. This is a place that was founded in violence and slavery and brutality, and the ripple effects are still with us. And Larry was very well-aware of that."
