= Gary Hawkins =

- Born: Thomasville, North Carolina
- Citizenship: United States of America
- Occupations: Filmmaker, professor
- Employer: Duke University
- Notable work: The Rough South of Larry Brown, The Rough South of Harry Crews, DownTime, Joe

Gary Hawkins is an American academic and independent filmmaker born and raised in Thomasville, North Carolina. Hawkins has written and directed six films, including The Rough South of Harry Crews, which won an Emmy and the Corporation for Public Broadcasting’s Gold Award in 1992, and The Rough South of Larry Brown, which was picked by The Oxford American as one of Thirteen Essential Southern Documentaries and was reviewed by Variety as a “beautifully conceived documentary film.” Hawkins’s fiction screenplay DownTime was selected by The Sundance Institute for the Writer’s Lab in the winter of 2000.

Hawkins was the screenwriter of the 2013 film adaptation of the Larry Brown novel Joe, which was directed by one of his former students, David Gordon Green.

Hawkins is a former a member of the directing faculty at the North Carolina School of the Arts. As of 2012 he was a visiting professor at Duke University in North Carolina, teaching documentary film.
