= Steve Yarbrough (writer) =

American author and academic

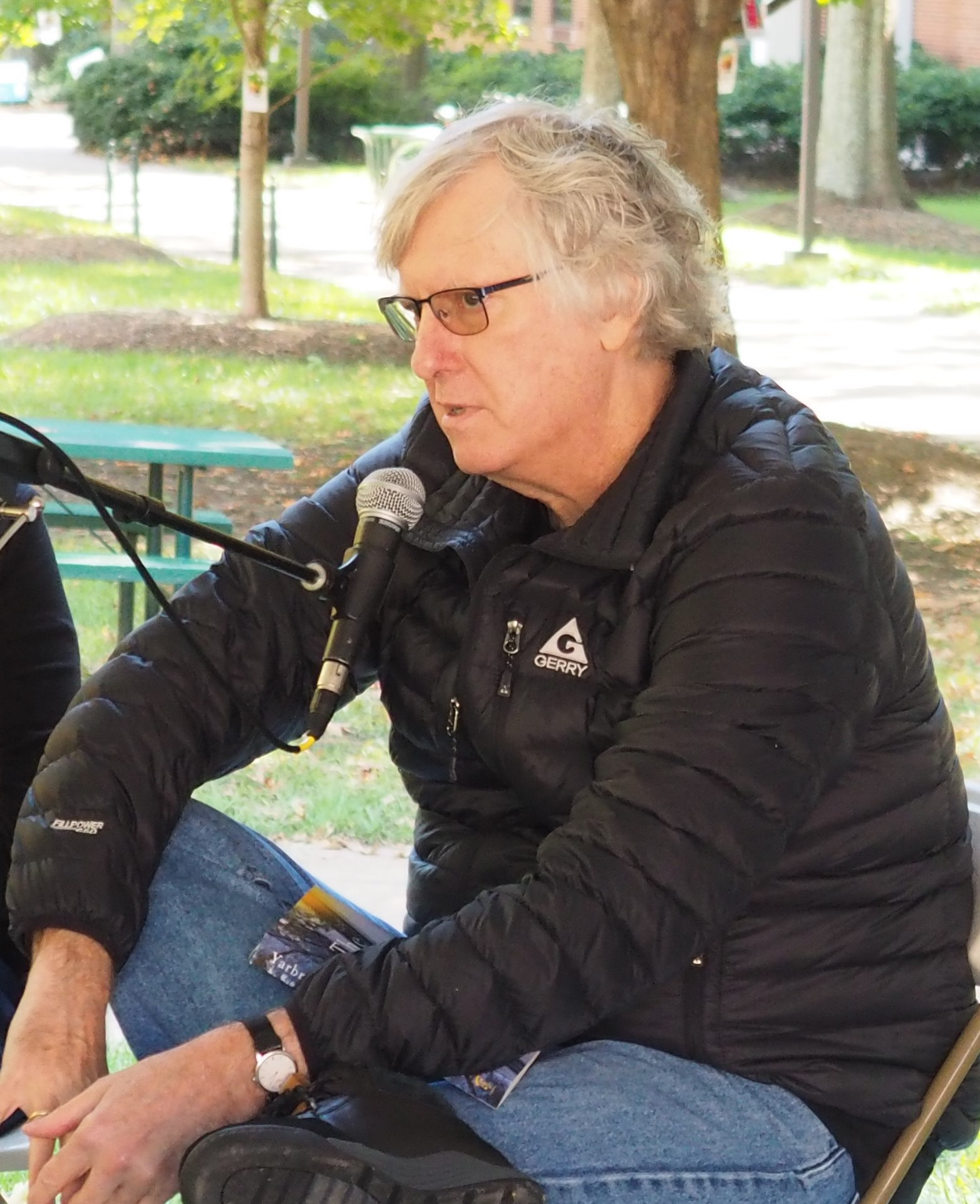
- Born: August 29, 1956 (age 70); Indianola, Mississippi, U.S.
- Education: University of Mississippi (BA, MA); University of Arkansas (MFA)
- Writing career
- Genres: Novels, short stories

Steve Yarbrough (born August 29, 1956) is an American author and academic, who teaches at Emerson College.

== Life ==
Born in Indianola, Mississippi, he received his B.A. and M.A. in English from the University of Mississippi and his M.F.A. in creative writing from the University of Arkansas. Writing largely within the Southern tradition, he draws his themes and characters from Southern history and mores in ways that have been compared to Flannery O'Connor, William Faulkner, and Willie Morris.

Yarbrough's major works include the novels The Realm of Last Chances (2013), Safe From The Neighbors (2010), The End of California (2006), Prisoners of War (2004), Visible Spirits (2001) and The Oxygen Man (1999), as well as short story collections such as Family Men (1990), Mississippi History (1994) and Veneer (1998). The Realm of Last Chances, his first novel set in New England, was published by Knopf 2013. It won the 2014 Mississippi Institute of Arts and Letters Award in Fiction. He is also the author of Bookmarked: Larry McMurtry's The Last Picture Show (2017), a nonfiction book describing Yarbrough's own journey to adulthood and becoming an author as it relates the titular novel's protagonist. Yarbrough's latest novel, The Unmade World, was published by Unbridled Books in 2018. It won the 2019 Massachusetts Book Award in Fiction.

His other honors include the Mississippi Authors Award, the California Book Award, and the 2000 Mississippi Institute of Arts and Letters Award in Fiction. The short story "The Rest of Her Life" appeared in The Best American Short Stories 1999. His novel, Prisoners of War, was a finalist for the 2005 PEN/Faulkner award. He has also won the 2010 Richard Wright Award for Literary Excellence. His work has been translated into Dutch, Japanese and Polish and published in the United Kingdom.

A professor of creative writing for many years at California State University, Fresno, Yarbrough is currently a professor in the Department of Writing, Literature and Publishing at Emerson College in Boston.

== Family ==
He is married to the Polish essayist and literary translator Ewa Hryniewicz-Yarbrough and they have two daughters, Antonina Parris-Yarbrough and Lena Yarbrough. He divides his time between Stoneham, Massachusetts, and Kraków.

== Bibliography ==
- ”Stay Gone Days,” (2022) {ISBN 9781632461353}
- The Unmade World, (2018) ISBN 9781609531430, OCLC 1016956496
- The Realm of Last Chances (2013) ISBN 9780345804884, OCLC 910679696
- Safe From The Neighbors (2010) ISBN 9780307472151, OCLC 715271401
- The End of California (2006)
- Prisoners of War (2004)
- Visible Spirits (2001) ISBN 9780375725777, OCLC 411309276
- The Oxygen Man (1999)

Short story collections

- Family Men (1990) ISBN 9781611176674, OCLC 949850820
- Mississippi History (1994)
- Veneer (1998. ISBN 9780826211859, OCLC 245814120
- Stay Gone Days (2022)

Non-fiction

- Bookmarked: Larry McMurtry's The Last Picture Show (2017) ISBN 9781632460493, OCLC 959035062
