= Devil's Knot: The True Story of the West Memphis Three =

2002 true crime book by Mara Leveritt

- Author: Mara Leveritt
- Language: English
- Subject: West Memphis Three
- Genre: Non-fiction, Crime
- Publisher: Atria Books
- Publication date: 2002
- Publication place: United States
- Pages: 432
- ISBN: 0-7434-1759-3
- OCLC: 50728429
- Dewey Decimal: 364.15/23/0976794 21
- LC Class: HV6534.W47 L49 2002

Devil's Knot: The True Story of the West Memphis Three is a 2002 true crime book by Mara Leveritt, about the 1993 murders of three eight-year-old children and the subsequent trials of three teenagers charged with and convicted of the crimes. The names of the three teens convicted - Damien Echols, Jason Baldwin, and Jessie Misskelley - would come to be known as the West Memphis Three. Leveritt's book revolves around the central idea that the three teenagers' convictions stemmed from "Satanic panic" rather than actual evidence. The book also focuses on one of the victim's stepfathers and his possible connection with the murders. All three teenagers convicted were released on August 19, 2011. A film of the same name was released in 2013.

== Synopsis ==
On May 5, 1993, Christopher Byers, Michael Moore, and Steven Branch went missing from their homes in West Memphis, Arkansas. The next day, their bodies were found in the woods near their homes with evidence showing they had been brutally beaten and savagely murdered. In Byers' case the evidence revealed that he had been castrated, and his genitals skinned before he was killed. News of the boys' deaths and the manner in which it happened soon reached the inhabitants of the small community. The rumor then spread that the nature of Byers' death, in particular hinted that the deaths may have been related to a Satanic ritual.

Weeks after the murders, a local woman, Vicki Hutcheson, brought her eight-year-old son Aaron to see the police. Aaron claimed to have witnessed the kidnapping of his three friends. Vicki volunteered to help the investigation by becoming "involved" with both Jessie and Damien. Hutcheson was a neighbor of Jessie's and coaxed him into setting up a "meeting" with Damien, so Hutcheson and Damien could get to know each other. Vicki would later claim to the police that she had attended an Esbat with both men. Years after the trials, Hutcheson would admit that she had lied about attending the Esbat. Over the months that led up to the arrests and trials, her son Aaron would also change his account of what happened numerous times; each time the story became more outrageous and unbelievable.

Eventually, the police brought in Jessie Misskelley for questioning in relation to the murders. Misskelley was 17 and considered to have a mild intellectual disability. Despite this, a simple questioning turned into a heated interrogation by West Memphis Police, which resulted in a confession from Misskelley that was almost immediately recanted. Based on this confession and the story told to police by Aaron Hutcheson, Misskelley, Echols, and Baldwin were all arrested and charged with three counts of Capital Murder. Each of the three men encountered issues during the course of the trials, including the inability to have the trial moved away from the Arkansas area, lack of the prosecution's required assistance in the delivery of all intended evidence to the defense, and a judge the author perceived was biased.

Author Mara Leveritt makes numerous comparisons of the Memphis Three trials to the Salem Witch Trials, stating that the three Memphis defendants were convicted based on the "Satanic Craze" the community was surrounded by after the murders. Actual evidence used by the prosecution during the trials included pictures of Metallica T-shirts worn by Jason Baldwin and books checked out by Damien Echols at his public library; the prosecutions' cases offered little more than circumstantial evidence. Eventually, all three defendants were convicted of the murders, with Jason Baldwin and Jessie Misskelley receiving life sentences without parole, and Damien Echols receiving the death penalty.

== Central figures ==
- Damien Echols – Portrayed in the media as the group's "ringleader"; a central figure throughout the case, with a lot of attention focused on the prosecution's attempt to vilify him to the point of conviction.
- Jason Baldwin – Damien's "best friend" and considered by many "guilty by association" for his friendship with Echols. Prosecutors used Jason's Metallica T-shirts as evidence that he was involved in "satanic activity" and "the trappings of the occult".
- Jessie Misskelley – Friend of both Damien and Jason's; considered mildly mentally disabled, and at the time of his arrest, he had the education level of a fourth grader despite being 17 years old. His confession was the basis for the arrests and convictions of Echols and Baldwin, despite its many critical inconsistencies.
- John Mark Byers – Christopher Byers' stepfather; was the most outspoken family member of any of the victims. His numerous run-ins with the law including a violent outburst against his former wife and the mysterious death of Christopher's mother. Questions were raised as to his involvement in the murders after he gave a knife to HBO Productions that contained Christopher's blood type in the fold. Byers denied ever using the knife to HBO and police, and recanted his associated statement only after the police informed him that they had found blood on the knife that matched Christopher's. Byers died in a car accident in July 2020.
- Gary Gitchell – Chief Inspector for West Memphis Police. When asked during a press conference how confident he felt about the case against Echols, Baldwin and Misskelley, based on a scale from "1 to 10," he stated: "An Eleven".
- Judge David Burnett – Judge presiding over the trials; portrayed in the book as stubborn and biased toward the prosecution.
- Ron Lax – Private Investigator who lends his services to Damien Echols and goes on to uncover many details of concern surrounding the arrests and trials.
- Christopher Byers – Murder victim
- Michael Moore – Murder victim
- Steve Branch – Murder victim

== Film adaptation ==
Atom Egoyan directed the 2013 film adaptation, starring Colin Firth as Ron Lax and Reese Witherspoon as Pamela Hobbs, mother of Steven Branch, which was produced by Worldview Entertainment. The film premiered at the Toronto International Film Festival and was released in U.S. theaters on May 9, 2014.
