= Joe (2013 film) =

- French theatrical release poster
- Directed by: David Gordon Green
- Screenplay by: Gary Hawkins
- Based on: Joe by Larry Brown
- Produced by: David Gordon Green; Lisa Muskat; Derrick Tseng; Christopher Woodrow
- Starring: Nicolas Cage; Tye Sheridan
- Cinematography: Tim Orr
- Edited by: Colin Patton
- Music by: Jeff McIlwain; David Wingo
- Production companies: Worldview Entertainment; DreamBridge Films; Muskat Filmed Properties; Rough House Pictures
- Distributed by: Lionsgate; Roadside Attractions
- Release dates: August 30, 2013 (Venice); April 11, 2014 (United States)
- Running time: 117 minutes
- Country: United States
- Language: English
- Box office: $2.4 million

Joe is a 2013 American independent Southern Gothic crime drama film directed and co-produced by David Gordon Green, co-produced by Lisa Muskat, Derrick Tseng and Christopher Woodrow and written by Gary Hawkins, based on Larry Brown's 1991 novel of the same name. It stars Nicolas Cage and Tye Sheridan, revolving around a tormented blue-collar ex-con (Cage) in rural Texas who hires a 15-year-old boy (Sheridan) for his tree servicing crew and protects him from his abusive and alcoholic father.

The film premiered at the 70th Venice International Film Festival on August 30, 2013, with a subsequent screening at the 2013 Toronto International Film Festival. The film was then distributed in limited theatrical release by Lionsgate Films on April 11, 2014. It received positive reviews from critics.

== Plot ==
In rural Texas, 15-year-old Gary Jones asks Joe Ransom, the even-tempered tattooed chain-smoking boss of a Texan tree-poisoning crew, for a job, and impresses him with his industriousness. The next day, Gary brings his alcoholic father, Wade, to work, but Wade's poor attitude and laziness get them fired. Joe witnesses Wade beat Gary and take his money. Gary later goes to Joe's house to ask for his job back, swearing he'll make up for his father's behavior. Joe agrees, and Gary begins working for him, hiding his money from Wade.

Willie Russell, a criminal with whom Joe has a long-standing feud, shoots and wounds Joe as he leaves a friend's house. Later, Gary meets Willie and asks for a ride home; when Willie makes lewd comments about Gary's younger sister, Dorothy, Gary beats him up. Later, Wade beats to death a homeless man, stealing his liquor. Willie confronts Joe at a bar and asks where Gary lives in order to seek revenge. Joe does not answer and, when Willie presses him, beats him up. Joe tells the bartender to call the police before fleeing to a brothel but leaves after getting spooked by a guard dog. He goes home, getting his dog Faith and returns to the brothel, setting it on the guard dog, and has a prostitute give him oral sex. He leaves with his dog, who has killed the guard dog. Two police officers stop him at gunpoint, and Joe challenges them to a fight. Joe is arrested but released.

Wade asks Gary for money, but Gary denies having any. Wade finds food in the cupboard and questions how he can afford food. They get into an argument that ends with Wade pulling a knife. He leaves but threatens to return and find Gary's money. Gary visits Joe, who tells him that he served 29 months for assaulting police officers. Gary agrees to help Joe look for his missing dog. After spending hours together and bonding, they find the dog and Joe gives Gary his lighter as a keepsake. Joe finds Wade walking and offers him a ride. They do not get far before Wade insults Gary and accuses Joe of not paying him. Joe grabs him by the collar and threatens to hurt him if anything happens to Gary.

Later on, Gary tells Joe that he has enough money to buy his truck, and Joe takes him to the dealership where he has bought a new one. Joe tells Gary to keep the money he was going to use to buy Joe's truck and use it to obtain insurance. When he questions what insurance is, Joe promises to help him with it. As Joe drives home, a patrol cop stops him and tries to make him take a breathalyzer, but Joe refuses and drives away. After an altercation, Joe beats up the officer. A senior officer, a friend of Joe's and a fellow ex-con, visit Joe and says the patrol cop had it coming but warns him to keep his nose clean.

Gary arrives at Joe's house, his face bruised, and asks to borrow his truck. Gary reveals that Wade beat him up, stole his truck, and left with Dorothy, intent on pimping her out to Willie and his goon. They go after Wade. Meanwhile, Willie pays Wade $60, and prepares to rape Dorothy first. Joe arrives and subdues Willie, and Gary leaves with Dorothy for help. Willie begs an unmoved Joe for his life, but as Joe prepares to kill him, one of Willie's thugs shoots him in the side and accidentally shoots Willie as well. Joe kills the thug then finishes Willie off before limping towards Wade, who is standing on a nearby bridge. He tries to shoot him, but misses. He attempts to shoot Wade again, but finds he is out of bullets. Wade asks Joe if he is his friend, and when Joe doesn't answer, leaps to his death. Joe then collapses and looks at the gaping wound in his side. Gary arrives with the sheriff and embraces Joe as he dies. He looks down and sees his father's body.

Later, it is shown that an untold amount of time has passed. Gary is seen driving Joe's car with Joe's dog. He arrives at a job interview to replant the woods Joe and his crew had originally torn down.

== Cast ==
- Nicolas Cage as Joe Ransom
- Tye Sheridan as Gary Jones
- Heather Kafka as Lacy
- Ronnie Gene Blevins as Willie Russell
- Brian Mays as Junior
- Sue Rock as Merle
- Sam Velasquez as Archuleta
- Adriene Mishler as Connie
- Gary Poulter as Wade Jones
- Dana Freitag as Sue
- Anna Niemtschk as Dorothy

== Reception ==
Rotten Tomatoes reports that 87% of critics gave the film a positive review based on 137 reviews with an average score of 7.3/10, with the site consensus: "Rich in atmosphere and anchored by a powerful performance from Nicolas Cage, Joe is a satisfying return to form for its star — as well as director David Gordon Green". On Metacritic, it has a score of 74 out of 100 based on reviews from 36 critics.

Peter Bradshaw of the The Guardian praised the film's social realism style, and compared the film to Green's earlier work George Washington, and the style of filmmaker Terrence Malick.

The film circulated into the mainstream news when actor Gary Poulter was found dead in a shallow body of water on February 19, 2013, before the film was ever released. Poulter, who played Wade in the film, was homeless, suffered from alcoholism and was already seriously ill. His only other acting credit was as a background extra in the TV series Thirtysomething. Producers worried that casting Poulter in the film would be a risk because of his alcoholism, but Green stayed committed to having him in the film. Writing for RogerEbert.com, Peter Sobczynski called Poulter's performance "stunning" and "one of the great one-shot performances in the history of the cinema".
