= Paradise Lost: The Child Murders at Robin Hood Hills =

1996 American documentary film

Paradise Lost: Child Murders at Robin Hood Hills
- DVD cover
- Directed by: Joe Berlinger; Bruce Sinofsky
- Produced by: Joe Berlinger; Bruce Sinofsky
- Starring: Jessie Misskelley Jr. Damien Echols; Jason Baldwin
- Cinematography: Robert Richman
- Edited by: Joe Berlinger; Bruce Sinofsky
- Music by: Metallica
- Production company: Creative Thinking International Ltd.
- Distributed by: Home Box Office (HBO)
- Release date: June 10, 1996
- Running time: 150 minutes
- Country: United States
- Language: English

Paradise Lost: The Child Murders at Robin Hood Hills is a 1996 American documentary film directed, produced, and edited by Joe Berlinger and Bruce Sinofsky about the trials of the West Memphis Three, three teenage boys accused of the May 1993 murders and sexual mutilation of three prepubescent boys (Steve Edward Branch, Christopher Byers, and Michael Moore) as a part of an alleged satanic ritual in West Memphis, Arkansas.

The film uses the music of Metallica instead of an original soundtrack, the first time that the band authorized their music to be used in a film; the accused teenagers were fans of the band, something which played a part in their trials. It was well received by critics, and was nominated for the Primetime Emmy Award for Outstanding Informational Programming. It was followed by two sequels, also made by Berlinger and Sinofsky, which followed the evolution of the case through the years: Paradise Lost 2: Revelations (2000), and Paradise Lost 3: Purgatory (2011).

== Description ==
The film documents the events following the arrests of Misskelley, Echols, and Baldwin for the murders of three eight-year-old boys, Christopher Byers, Michael Moore, and Stevie Branch, whose naked and hogtied bodies were discovered in a ditch in West Memphis, Arkansas.

Filmmakers Joe Berlinger and Bruce Sinofsky interviewed numerous people connected with the case, including the parents of the victims, the parents of the accused, members of the West Memphis Police Department (WMPD) and all the defendants involved in the trial. Berlinger and Sinofsky are not filmed themselves, and the dialogue is provided by the interviewee, rather than using a "Q & A" format.

The film starts with an introduction to the case, before moving on to the arrests of the three teenagers. Much of the community, including the detectives and the victims' parents, believe the murders were committed by the teenagers as part of a Satanic ritual. During the trial, Damien Echols is asked about his familiarity with Aleister Crowley's belief system. Echols also states that he likes reading books by Anton LaVey and Stephen King.

The community is shown to be politically conservative and strongly Evangelical Christian. Because Misskelley had provided police with a confession, his trial is separated from that of Damien and Jason, and is covered in the first half of the film.

=== Trials coverage ===
The first trial to be covered in the film is that of Misskelley, a trial which was severed from those of Echols and Baldwin since it was Misskelley who confessed. Emphasis is placed on the fact that there is a strong possibility that the confession was coerced. Interviews are conducted with Misskelley himself, his family and friends, and his attorney Dan Stidham. Misskelley is sentenced to life in prison.

Part two of the film documents the trials of Echols and Baldwin. Like the coverage of Misskelley's trial, there are interviews with both defendants, their attorneys and their families. The families of the victims also share their views.

During the course of filming, John Mark Byers, the stepfather of one of the victims (Christopher Byers), gave the filmmakers a knife which had blood in the hinge. The filmmakers turned the knife over to police, who examined it; the DNA was similar to that of John Mark Byers and Christopher Byers, but the evidence was nonetheless inconclusive since the DNA evidence produced was fragmented and could not provide concrete links.

== Production ==
The production had 79 filming days over a 10-month period, starting in the weeks after the murders through the trials and convictions, at the actual Arkansas locations. The movie marks the first time Metallica allowed their music to be used in a movie. A decade later, the directors made Metallica: Some Kind of Monster about the band.

== Reception ==
The movie was well received by critics, including Roger Ebert. The film was followed by two sequels. The first was Paradise Lost 2: Revelations (2000), which suggested that further evidence was missed or suppressed and attempted to prove Echols' innocence. This was followed by Paradise Lost 3: Purgatory (2011), which was nominated for the Academy Award for Best Documentary Feature. On the review aggregator website Rotten Tomatoes, the film holds an approval rating of 100% based on 24 reviews.

== See also ==
- Devil's Knot – 2013 American biographical crime drama film
- West of Memphis – 2012 New Zealand-American documentary film
