= Larry Brown (writer) =

American novelist

- Screenshot from The Rough South of Larry Brown (2002)
- Born: William Larry Brown; July 9, 1951; Oxford, Mississippi, U.S.
- Died: November 24, 2004 (aged 53); Tula, Mississippi, U.S.
- Occupation: Writer
- Writing career
- Period: 1984–2004
- Genres: novel, short story, essay
- Subject: Southern literature
- Notable works: Dirty Work (1989); On Fire (1993); Father and Son (1996); Fay (2000)
- Literary movement: Grit lit

William Larry Brown (July 9, 1951 – November 24, 2004) was an American novelist, non-fiction, and short story writer. He received numerous awards during his lifetime, including the Mississippi Institute of Arts and Letters award for fiction, the Lila Wallace-Reader's Digest Award, and Mississippi's Governor's Award For Excellence in the Arts. Brown was also the first two-time winner of the Southern Book Award for Fiction.

His notable works include Dirty Work, Joe, Father and Son, and Big Bad Love. The last of these was adapted for a 2001 film of the same name, starring Debra Winger and Arliss Howard. In 2013 a film adaptation of Joe was released, featuring Nicolas Cage.

Independent filmmaker Gary Hawkins, who wrote the screenplay for Joe, has directed an award-winning documentary of Brown's life and work in The Rough South of Larry Brown (2002).

== Life and writing ==
Larry Brown was born on July 9, 1951, and grew up near Oxford, Mississippi. He graduated from high school in Oxford, but did not want to go to college, opting instead for a stint in the Marines. Many years later, he took a creative writing class at the University of Mississippi. Brown worked at a small stove company before joining the city fire department in Oxford.

Always an avid reader, Brown began writing in 1980 in his spare time while he worked as a firefighter (at City Station No.1 on North Lamar Blvd.) His memoir On Fire describes sleepless nights at the fire station, but staying up to read and write while the other firefighters slept. Other duties included answering to alarms in and around the city of Oxford, which included the University of Mississippi campus. Brown once responded to a fire at Rowan Oak—the home of William Faulkner, but now a museum.

By his own account, as he was teaching himself to write fiction, Brown wrote five unpublished novels. His first try at a novel was about a man-eating bear loose in Yellowstone Park. According to Brown it was unpublishable:

You would not believe how horrible. Just imagine. It was 327 single-spaced pages of sex and man-eating.

Brown also said that he wrote hundreds of short stories before he began to be published. Later, he would point to his own early failures and false starts, and offer encouragement to young writers and students caught in their own struggles with creative expression.

=== Published author and acclaim ===
His first publication was a short story that appeared in the June 1982 issue of biker magazine Easyriders. His first book was a collection of short stories: Facing the Music (1988), followed the next year by his first novel Dirty Work (1989). After 1990, Brown turned to writing full-time and increasingly turned to the novel as his primary form. Brown's novels include Joe (1991), Father and Son (1996), Fay (2000), and The Rabbit Factory (2003).

All of his books were well-received and, beginning with Dirty Work in 1989, he steadily gained a reputation for his novels, most receiving good reviews, acclaim, and steady sales. Nearly all his work was marked by gritty realism, sudden and shocking violence, and diachronic narrative. Brown responded to criticism regarding the "brutality" in his work by saying, "Well that's fine. It's ok if you call it brutal, but just admit by God that it's honest."

In March 2007, Algonquin Books of Chapel Hill published Brown's unfinished novel, A Miracle of Catfish. Although Brown died before finishing the book, the final page of the published version includes his notes about how he wanted the novel to end. The novel includes a lengthy introduction by Brown's editor, Shannon Ravenel, discussing her work on the project and her work with Brown over the years.

Except for the novel The Rabbit Factory, all of Brown's books were published by Algonquin Books of Chapel Hill, now a division of Workman Publishing. The paperback editions of Brown's books were issued by various publishers, including Warner Books, Algonquin, Holt, and Vintage Books, a division of Random House.

Brown's nonfiction includes On Fire (1995), a memoir of his 17 years (1973–1990) as a firefighter, and Billy Ray's Farm (2001), a collection of essays.

For one semester, Brown taught as a writer-in-residence in the creative writing program at the University of Mississippi, temporarily taking over the position held by his friend Barry Hannah. He later served as visiting writer at the University of Montana in Missoula. He taught briefly at other colleges throughout the United States.

He has been compared to other Southern writers, including Cormac McCarthy, William Faulkner, and Harry Crews. In interviews and some of his essays, Brown cited these authors, along with Flannery O'Connor, Raymond Carver, and Charles Bukowski, as influences.

Brown had also cited contemporary music as an influence, and his tastes were broad. He appeared with the Texas alt-rock band fronted by Alejandro Escovedo, a good friend of his. Brown cited the lyrics of Leonard Cohen as an influence. He had friends in the film industry, including Billy Bob Thornton.

== Personal life and death ==
Brown died of an apparent heart attack at his home in the Yocona community, near Oxford, in November 2004.

Brown was survived by his wife Mary Annie Coleman Brown, and three children: Billy Ray (son), Shane (son), and LeAnne (daughter). Brown was also survived by his mother (Leona Barlow Brown) and two grandchildren. His father (Knox Brown) died in 1968.

== Selected bibliography ==
Fiction

- Facing the Music (1988) – short stories
- Dirty Work (1989) – novel
- Big Bad Love (1990) – short stories
- Joe (1991) – novel
- Father and Son (1996) – novel
- Fay (2000) – novel
- The Rabbit Factory (2003) – novel
- A Miracle of Catfish (2007) – novel
- Tiny Love: The Complete Stories of Larry Brown (2019) - short stories

Nonfiction

- On Fire (1993) – memoir
- Billy Ray's Farm: Essays from a Place Called Tula (2001) - essays
