= Mississippi Institute of Arts and Letters =

Privately funded foundation

The Mississippi Institute of Arts and Letters (MIAL) is a privately funded foundation created to recognize annually the greatest accomplishments in art, music, literature, and photography among Mississippians. The idea was conceived by, among others, former Mississippi Governor William Winter, Dr. Cora Norman, Dr. Aubrey Lucas, and Dr. Noel Polk in 1978, and the first awards were given out in 1980.

Nominations for a Mississippi Institute of Arts and Letters Award may be made only by registered members of the institute. The winners are chosen by a jury of prominent academics in each of nine fields:

1. Fiction
2. Non-fiction
3. Life Writing
4. Youth Literature
5. Visual Art
6. Music Composition (Classical)
7. Music Composition (Contemporary)
8. Photography
9. Poetry

The ceremony is held in a different Mississippi city each year.

== Partial list of past winners ==
Some of the notable winners of this award have included: Walker Percy, Ellen Douglas, Ellen Gilchrist, Richard Ford, Larry Brown, Rick Bass, Lewis Nordan, Beverly Lowry, Donna Tartt, Clifton Taulbert, Barry Hannah, Willie Morris, Leontyne Price, Cynthia Shearer, Stephen Ambrose, Steve Yarbrough, Tom Franklin, Brad Watson, Shelby Foote, Natasha Trethewey, Birney Imes, Maude Schyler Clay, William Grant Still, Morgan Freeman, Christopher Maurer, Wyatt Waters, Logan Skelton, and many others. Lifetime achievement awards have been presented to artists such as Gulf Coast painter and potter Walter Anderson, Jackson writer Eudora Welty, and distinguished film actor from the Delta, Morgan Freeman.
