= Gary Poulter =

American actor (1959–2013)

- Born: September 16, 1959; Upland, California, U.S.
- Died: February 19, 2013 (aged 53); Austin, Texas, U.S.
- Occupation: actor

Gary Poulter (September 16, 1959 - February 19, 2013) was an American street performer and actor known for his lead role alongside Nicolas Cage in David Gordon Green's 2013 film Joe. Poulter was homeless, living on the streets of Austin, Texas when he was cast in the role of Wade, the abusive alcoholic father of Gary, played by Tye Sheridan.

== Early life ==
Poulter grew up in Upland, California. At 17, he joined the Navy and served on a ship in Japan. He went AWOL for 1 1/2 years in Japan and ultimately was court-martialed in Washington, D.C., whereupon he received a dishonorable discharge.

== Film role ==
In 2012, Poulter was recruited from the streets of Austin to play the third lead, "Wade", in the film Joe, which became his sole film performance, although he worked as a background extra in 1987 in the TV series Thirtysomething. Shortly before landing the film role, Poulter worked for a traveling carnival, but he was left naked on the side of the road after he was caught stealing money.

=== Reviews ===
The Independent summed up Poulter's performance in its movie review, writing, "In his only screen role, he offers an utterly compelling portrait of a man so consumed by self-loathing that he will go to extreme lengths to destroy the life of his son."

Movie critic Peter Sobczynski in his review for RogerEbert.com described Poulter's film debut as a "stunning performance" and "one of the great one-shot performances in the history of the cinema."

=== Award ===
The Austin Film Critics Association gave Poulter the Special Honorary Award in 2014 for his performance in Joe.

== Death ==
Before the film's release, Poulter was found dead on February 10, 2013, at the edge of Lady Bird Lake, a river-like reservoir in Austin, Texas. His death was ruled a result of drowning with acute ethanol intoxication, as determined by a medical examiner. Director Green dedicated the film Joe to Poulter.
