= David Burnett (politician) =

American politician and former jurist

Member of the Arkansas Senate from the 22nd district
- In office January 1, 2013 – December 31, 2016
- Preceded by: Jeremy Hutchinson
- Succeeded by: Dave Wallace

Member of the Arkansas Senate from the 15th district
- In office January 1, 2011 – December 31, 2012
- Preceded by: Steve Bryles
- Succeeded by: David J. Sanders

Personal details
- Party: Democratic
- Spouse: Sonja Burnett
- Education: University of Arkansas (B.S. 1963, J.D. 1966)
- Occupation: Jurist
- Website: www.arkleg.state.ar.us/assembly/2013/2014F/Pages/MemberProfile.aspx?member=Burnett

David Burnett (born 1942 or 1943) is a retired American Democratic politician and former member of the Arkansas Senate. Before he entered the Senate, Burnett had been a judge. Burnett is known as the trial judge of the controversial West Memphis Three trial during which he made several serious mistakes.

== West Memphis Three case ==
Burnett was the presiding judge in the murder trials of Jessie Misskelley, Damien Echols, and Jason Baldwin, collectively known as the West Memphis Three. In February 1994, after a jury convicted Misskelley of one count of first-degree murder and two counts of second-degree murder, Burnett sentenced Misskelley, then 18 years old, to life in prison plus 40 years. In March 1994, after a jury convicted Echols and Baldwin of three counts of capital murder, Burnett sentenced Echols to death and Baldwin, 17 at the time, to life in prison without parole.

In 2007, new DNA testing became available that was not technologically possible at the time of the crime. It produced evidence that hairs found at the crime scene did not match Misskelley, Baldwin or Echols but did possibly match the stepfather of one of the victims. Based on this new information, all three defendants asked Burnett for a new trial. In September 2008, Burnett denied retrials for all three, saying the new evidence was "inconclusive".

In September 2008, Daniel Stidham, a judge since 2001 who had been Misskelley’s attorney in 1994, testified at a post-conviction relief hearing for the men. Stidham testified under oath that during the trial Burnett erred by making an improper communication with the jury during its deliberations. Stidham overheard Burnett discuss taking a lunch break with the jury foreman and heard the foreman reply that the jury was almost finished. According to Stidham, Judge Burnett responded, "You'll need food for when you come back for sentencing"; when the foreman asked what would happen if the defendant was acquitted, the judge closed the door without answering, thereby implying that he thought the three were guilty. Stidham then testified that his own failure to put this incident on the court record and his failure to meet the minimum requirements in state law to represent a defendant in a capital murder case were evidence of ineffective assistance of counsel, thus requiring Misskelley's conviction to be vacated.

In January 2010, Burnett denied motions for Baldwin and Misskelley to receive new trials based on inadequate representation during their original trials.

In November 2010, after Burnett had retired from the bench and been elected to the Arkansas Senate, the Arkansas Supreme Court ordered new evidentiary hearings for all three defendants based on the new DNA evidence. The state's high court rebuked Burnett's 2008 decision not to grant Echols a new trial based on the DNA evidence.

All three men were released from prison in August 2011 after they pleaded guilty to first-degree murder using an Alford plea, which allows the defendant to maintain their innocence while conceding that there is enough evidence to possibly convict them at trial. The men were resentenced to time served (18 years and 75 days) and immediately freed. In a February 2012 interview, Burnett stated, "I'm not real happy with the outcome. I would have preferred to see them have a new trial.” He stood by his actions, saying, "Frankly, everything I did was affirmed by the Arkansas Supreme Court."

== State Senate ==
In May 2010, Burnett defeated Blytheville Mayor Barrett E. Harrison in the Democratic primary for the state's 15th Senate district to succeed the term-limited Sen. Steve Bryles. Burnett took almost 64 percent of approximately 8,600 votes cast. Burnett won election in the general election running unopposed. Due to redistricting, Burnett ran for re-election in 2012 in the 22nd Senate District. He was elected both in the Democratic primary and general election without opposition.

In 2015, Burnett introduced a bill in the Arkansas Senate that would have abolished the death penalty in Arkansas. The bill failed to pass, officially dying when the state Senate adjourned sine die (when the chamber ended its business for the legislative session). In November 2016, Burnett was defeated in his re-election bid by Republican state Rep. Dave Wallace, losing by a margin of 62 percent to 38 percent. The race was the first that Burnett faced any opposition since the 2010 Democratic Primary for the state Senate 15th District's Democratic nomination, having run unopposed in the general elections of 2010 and 2012.

== Electoral history ==
Arkansas Senate 15th District Democratic Primary, 2010
Party	Candidate	Votes	%	±%
Democratic	David Burnett	5,472	63.7	N/A
Democratic	Barrett E. Harrison	3,121	36.3	N/A

Arkansas Senate 15th District election, 2010
Party	Candidate	Votes	%	±%
Democratic	David Burnett	N/A	100	N/A
Democratic hold				

Arkansas Senate 22nd District election, 2012
Party	Candidate	Votes	%	±%
Democratic	David Burnett	N/A	100	N/A
Democratic gain from Republican				

Arkansas Senate 22nd District election, 2016
Party	Candidate	Votes	%	±%
Republican	Dave Wallace	14,453	60.4	N/A
Democratic	David Burnett (I)	9,477	39.6	N/A
Republican gain from Democratic				
