= Mara Leveritt =

American investigative reporter and author

- Occupation: Investigative reporter
- Notable work: Devil's Knot: The True Story of the West Memphis Three

Mara Leveritt is an American investigative reporter, with a focus on Arkansas. In 1991, she reported on the international sale of plasma drawn from Arkansas prisoners, highlighting concerns about inadequate disease screening. The program ended in 1994. By then, plasma from Arkansas prisons had been linked to infections in Canada, where thousands of individuals contracted HIV or hepatitis C.

In 1995, Leveritt left newspaper reporting to write in-depth about other cases she considered disturbing. Her book The Boys on the Tracks has been called "a wrecking-ball tale of tragedy, malfeasance, and machine politics" and "one of the most important examples of investigative journalism in modern Arkansas history."

Reviewers described Devil's Knot about prosecutions of the West Memphis Three, as "a riveting portrait of a down-at-the-heels, socially conservative rural town with more than its share of corruption and violence" and "an indictment of a culture and legal system that failed to protect children as defendants or victims." The book was adapted for a feature film of the same name in 2013.

Dark Spell, a follow-up book about Jason Baldwin, one of the West Memphis Three, was called a "powerful look at how the wrong agenda can thoroughly undermine the justice system."

Leveritt's final book, All Quiet at Mena, explored the little-known conflicts between police work and politics surrounding the company that hid Barry Seal's smuggling aircraft in Arkansas. One review noted that " . . . with documents obtained under FOI and extensive cooperation from IRS and state police investigators who watched activities at the airport for years, [Leveritt] has contributed a wealth of new information." The Arkansas State Library listed the book as a "gem."

== Awards ==
Leveritt has been inducted into the Arkansas Writers' Hall of Fame. She has been awarded Arkansas's Booker Worthen Literary Prize (twice), a Laman Writer's Fellowship, Arkansas's Porter Prize, and an honorary doctorate of humane letters from the University of Arkansas at Little Rock.
