= List of people who entered an Alford plea =

The following is an incomplete list of notable individuals that have entered an Alford plea. An Alford plea (also referred to as Alford guilty plea and Alford doctrine) in the law of the United States is a guilty plea in criminal court, where the defendant does not admit the act and asserts innocence. Under the Alford plea the defendant admits that sufficient evidence exists with which the prosecution could likely convince a judge or jury to find the defendant guilty beyond a reasonable doubt.

== Background ==
=== Supreme Court case ===
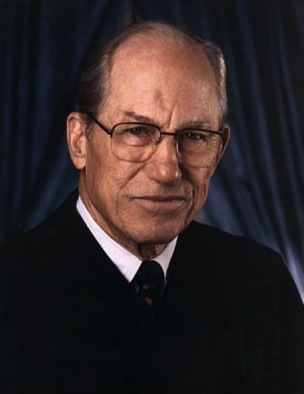
Supreme Court Justice Byron White wrote the majority opinion

This form of plea is derived from the 1970 ruling by the Supreme Court of the United States, in the case North Carolina v. Alford. Henry Alford of Forsyth County, North Carolina was indicted for first degree murder in 1963. At the time under North Carolina law a conviction of first degree murder automatically brought with it the death penalty, unless the jury recommended otherwise, in which case the defendant would receive a mandatory life sentence. Alford said he was innocent, but the prosecution had significant evidence to the contrary. Witnesses stated Alford had said he wanted to kill the victim, then grabbed his gun and left his residence. Witnesses said that Alford subsequently declared he had killed the victim. His defense advised Alford to plead to the crime of second degree murder because of the belief that the strong evidence would lead to a conviction. He pleaded guilty to second degree murder in 1963. He did so in order to avoid a possible death sentence. Alford maintained he was innocent of the crime itself, but feared going to trial because of the capital punishment associated with the charge of first degree murder. He was given a sentence of thirty years in jail.

Alford appealed, and argued that his conviction for second degree murder should be overturned because he said the plea was coercive in nature. The matter came before the Supreme Court, and in its ruling the court said that the trial judge in Alford's criminal case was appropriate in having accepted the defendant's plea of guilty. The Court said that the decision to plead guilty while maintaining his innocence was a reasonable choice for Alford to have made at the time. Supreme Court Justice Byron White wrote the majority opinion. The Supreme Court case was decided 5–3. "[T]hat he would not have pleaded except for the opportunity to limit the possible penalty does not necessarily demonstrate that the plea of guilty was not the product of a free and rational choice", said the Supreme Court decision. The Court ruled that a plea of guilty that was "a voluntary and intelligent choice among the alternative courses of action" was not a coercive decision. Justice White wrote that, "Express admission of guilt is not constitutional requisite to imposition of criminal penalty." In 1975, Alford died while in jail at the age of 57.

=== Usage of plea ===
When a defendant indicates an intention to plead guilty by Alford plea, the judge asks two questions: "Do you now consider it to be in your best interest to plead guilty?" and "Do you understand that upon your 'Alford plea' you will be treated as being guilty whether or not you admit that you are in fact guilty?" Prosecutors and defense lawyers characterize Alford pleas as a required method of lessening pressure of the nature of the justice process. Both parties get to maneuver around not knowing what the outcome could be at trial, and are able to come to a resolution. The Alford plea does not itself affect the sentencing process, and the convicted individual is sentenced just as if he had entered a normal guilty plea. The defendant may be hurt at the sentencing process by having used an Alford plea, as the judge may see this as a sign that the defendant has not accepted responsibility for his actions. Duke University law professor Robert P. Mosteller commented on this possible effect at sentencing, "They get you more harm than good." Orange County, North Carolina District Attorney Jim Woodall said that the frequency of Alford pleas is higher with criminal cases involving a charge of a sexual offense, as the defendant does not wish to admit to their family and the public that they were responsible for the crime. Psychologist Bob Carbo noted that sexual offenders undergoing treatment for their actions after being ordered to so under terms of their Alford plea cause problems because the first step in therapy is to take responsibility for committing the crime. "We can't help this person if they're not willing to admit they did something", said Carbo.

John Gulash, a lawyer on the Connecticut State Bar Association's criminal justice executive committee, acknowledged, "It's unfortunate, but it's a reality that you will receive, in most instances, a much more severe penalty if you lost after trial than if you pled before the trial." Defendants gain the potential benefit of being able to tell possible employers after their conviction in a crime that they maintained their innocence and only pleaded guilty under the Alford doctrine because of the nature of the situation and the evidence presented. Professor of law at Quinnipiac University and former federal prosecutor Jeffrey Meyer said of the Alford doctrine, "It's part of an idealist vision of a judicial system that it is for the adjudication of truth." Meyer commented on what would happen were the Alford doctrine to become no longer applicable, "My suspicion is if the state could dispense with the Alford doctrine, over time, it probably wouldn't change very much the rate at which cases plead out. More than 95 percent of cases in federal court go by guilty plea. It's difficult to make the case that without the Alford doctrine, there would be an immense number of defendants who would end up going to trial." Raleigh, North Carolina lawyer Wade Smith said that the frequency of application of the Alford plea is, "Fairly often. There are many times when people don't want to plead guilty, but then do, in fact, plead guilty."

== List ==
=== A ===
- Raven Abaroa - The jury was deadlocked in Raven Abaroa's 2013 trial for the murder of his wife Janet. When the state of North Carolina offered him a deal shortly before his second trial was to begin, he took it, saying, "I didn't receive a fair trial the first time, and I don’t think I'll receive a fair trial the second time." Abaroa was sentenced to 95 to 123 months in prison for the crime of voluntary manslaughter, and ended up serving approximately 7 years.
- Henry Alford – indicted for first degree murder in 1963; maintained his innocence but pleaded guilty to second degree murder due to the significance of the evidence. He pleaded guilty to second degree murder so as to avoid the death penalty. Alford appealed, and the Supreme Court of the United States issued a ruling that trial courts are allowed to accept pleas of guilty from criminal defendants even if the defendants do not wish to admit to guilty, and wish to plead guilty in order to take advantage of a plea deal. This type of plea described by the 1970 ruling of the Supreme Court became known as the Alford plea.
- John Dylan Adams - entered an Alford plea in the kidnapping, rape and killing of 20-year-old nursing student Holly Lynn Bobo. Adams is currently (April 2018) serving a 35-year sentence without parole in the Tennessee Department of Correction.

=== B ===
- Scott Bairstow – actor of Party of Five fame, entered Alford plea in 2003 to second-degree assault; was initially charged with second-degree child rape of 12-year-old girl. He received a sentence of four months in jail for the assault.
- Jason Baldwin. Arkansas, 2011 One of the West Memphis Three. Along with Echols and Misskelley, he was convicted of the 1993 murders of three 8-year-old boys in 1994. He was sentenced to life without parole. He entered the plea to get Echols off death row. He was sentenced to time served: 18 years and 78 days and released that same day.
- Hunter Biden – son of President of the United States Joe Biden. A lawyer representing him entered an Alford plea on September 5, 2024 in regards to tax-related offenses.
- James B. Black, former Speaker of the North Carolina House of Representatives, gave an Alford plea in 2007 on charges brought by the state of North Carolina of obstruction of justice and bribery. Black was accused of bribing former state Representative Michael Decker $50,000 to switch his political allegiance, thereby keeping Black in power as co-Speaker of the House.
- Michael Bray – American anti-abortion activist; he was arrested by U.S. federal law enforcement from the ATF in connection with an anti-abortion bombing. He entered an Alford plea in 1987 and received a prison sentence of six years. He served just over forty-six months in a federal jail.
- Ted Brown – American and former collegiate and professional football player, played for the Minnesota Vikings. After being charged with criminal sexual assault in an incident in Mille Lacs County, Minnesota, Brown entered an Alford plea on a lesser charge, and agreed to perform 100 hours of community service. Mille Lacs County challenged the plea deal, and in 2006 a ruling from the Minnesota Court of Appeals overturned it after the woman involved in the incident told prosecutors she did not approve of the deal.

=== C ===
- Kiari Cephus – rapper known as Offset; entered an Alford plea in December 2015 to felony battery and inciting a riot within a penal facility in exchange for dismissing criminal charges in relation to an April 2015 arrest at the Georgia Southern University for drug and firearm possession.
- Raymond Clark III, the perpetrator in the murder of Annie Le.
- H. Brent Coles – former Mayor of Boise, Idaho; entered an Alford plea to two felony charges of presenting a fraudulent account or voucher and misuse of public money by officers. The plea was made in accordance with a deal by the State Attorney General of Idaho. Coles had resigned from his position as mayor amidst complaints filed against him by the State Attorney General's office.

=== D ===
- Antoinette Davis, one of the two defendants convicted of the 2009 murder of Shaniya Davis, who was Antoinette's five-year-old daughter. Antoinette sold Davis to her male co-defendant Mario Andrette McNeill to pay off a drug debt, and McNeill raped and murdered the girl after taking Davis from her house in Fayetteville, North Carolina. Antoinette entered an Alford plea for the second-degree murder and human trafficking of her daughter, and sentenced to at least 17 years in prison. McNeill was sentenced to death for first-degree murder.

=== E ===
- Damien Echols, Arkansas, 2011. One of the West Memphis Three. Along with Baldwin and Misskelley, he was convicted in 1994 for the 1993 murders of three 8-year-old boys. He was sentenced to death but always maintained his innocence. After entering the plea, he was sentenced to time served: 18 years and 78 days, and was released that same day.
- Edward Lee Elmore - Intellectually disabled man convicted in 1982 in South Carolina for the murder of Dorothy Edwards, a wealthy woman who had hired him to do handy work at her house. His first guilty verdict was overturned on appeal but he was convicted again at a second trial. Both times he was sentenced to death. In 2007, the Fourth Circuit Court of Appeals ordered a third trial due to ineffective assistance of counsel at his last trial. In 2012, after three decades in prison, Elmore entered an Alford plea, was sentenced to time served, and was released. He died in 2018.

=== F ===
- Benjamin Fawley – entered an Alford plea in 2006 to second degree murder in the Murder of Taylor Behl. He received a sentence of 30 years in prison. In November 2008, a judge rejected a petition by Fawley to have his sentence thrown out.
- Bob Filner – Democratic politician who represents California's 51st Congressional District in the U.S. House of Representatives; entered an Alford plea in 2007 to charges of trespassing. He had faced charges of assault and battery (crime) in an incident where a baggage handler for United Airlines at Dulles International Airport said he had pushed her. Filner was investigated in the matter by an ethics committee for the U.S House of Representatives.

=== H ===
- Pam Hupp - American woman who murdered Louis Gumpenberger.

=== J ===
- Adam Jones – professional American cornerback; entered an Alford plea in 2008 to a felony charge of obstruction of a police officer involving an incident from February 2006. After the plea deal involving the incident with the police officer in Georgia, Jones received a felony conviction.

=== L ===
- Joseph Lawrence – entered Alford plea to second degree murder in 2005, the Murder of Jason Gage. He had been arrested hours after Gage's dead body was discovered. Lawrence was sentenced to a term of 50 years in prison.

=== M ===
- Darren Mack – entered Alford plea in 2008 to the charge of attempted murder related to shooting of Chuck Weller, family court judge in Washoe County, Nevada. Mack stated in court that he shot the judge on the same day he had cut his wife Charla Mack's throat at his residence in Reno, Nevada.
- Lee Boyd Malvo – entered Alford plea in 2004 related to Beltway sniper attacks, as part of a plea deal to avoid the death penalty. Malvo's Alford plea was treated as a guilty plea at his sentencing hearing, and he received a term of life in prison for charges of murder and attempted murder.
- Jessie Misskelley, Jr., Arkansas, 2011, One of the West Memphis Three. Along with Echols and Baldwin, he was convicted of the 1993 murders of three 8-year-old boys in 1994. He was sentenced to life in prison. After entering the plea, he was sentenced to time served: 18 years and 78 days, and was released that same day.
- Jeff Monson – mixed martial arts fighter, entered an Alford plea related to the act of using spray-paint to add graffiti to the armed services recruitment center in Lacey, Washington. In addition to the Alford plea to spray-painting the military recruiting building, Monson also pleaded guilty to first-degree malicious mischief for painting an anarchist symbol at the Washington State Capitol.
- John Michael Montgomery – country music singer, entered an Alford plea in 2006, on charges related to drunken driving. Montgomery acknowledged that prosecutors in the case had sufficient evidence to convict him of the charges, agreed to pay fines and court costs and was ordered to finish an education session about alcohol usage.
- Alex Murdaugh - After being convicted of murdering his wife and youngest son, Murdaugh entered into a plea deal to resolve the remaining state-level charges against him that related to his decade of thefts from his clients and law partners. Murdaugh pleaded guilty to 21 of the charges, and entered into an Alford plea for one charge that regarded his alleged theft from his brother. In exchange, the approximately 88 remaining charges against him were dropped. Murdaugh received a 27-year sentence, to run concurrent with the two life sentences he is already serving.

=== P ===
- Ruben Patterson – American professional basketball player; entered an Alford plea in 2001 while in Seattle, Washington, on a charge related to an incident with his children's nanny. He had been charged by prosecutors in King County, Washington, with third-degree attempted rape, after the nanny stated to police that Patterson forced her to perform oral sex on him. Patterson received a sentence of 15 days in jail. Patterson was mandated to register as a sex offender in Washington.
- Michael Peterson - American novelist; On February 24, 2017, Peterson entered an Alford Plea to the voluntary manslaughter of Kathleen Peterson. The judge sentenced him to a maximum of 86 months in prison, with credit for time previously served. Because Peterson had already served more time than the sentence, he did not face additional prison time.

=== R ===
- Bhagwan Shree Rajneesh – later called Osho. Founder of Rajneesh movement. – entered an Alford plea and convicted on charges of immigration fraud. Fined $400,000 and deported from the United States in 1985, returned to his native India.
- Tina Resch, also known as Christina Boyer – entered an Alford plea to charges of aggravated assault and felony murder of Amber Bennet, Resch's three-year-old daughter. She received a jail sentence of life plus 20 years. Resch had previously been known for being related to possible poltergeist activity, and she was studied by a parapsychologist.
- Koren Robinson – American football wide receiver, entered an Alford plea in 2007 related to a felony charge of evading police, after an incident involving a high speed car chase. Under a plea deal, Robinson agreed to plead guilty to one felony charge of fleeing police, and prosecutors agreed to dismiss other charges including drunken driving, reckless driving and driving without a licence.
- Scott Rosenberg – film screenwriter; along with actor Vince Vaughn, entered an Alford plea in relation to a fight that occurred in a bar in Wilmington, North Carolina. The dispute occurred while the two were in the area filming Domestic Disturbance.
- Kelly Ryan – fitness professional, entered an Alford plea in 2008 in the death of Melissa James. James died in 2005; her body was found in a luxury vehicle in the desert outside Las Vegas, Nevada. As part of the Alford plea, Ryan pleaded guilty to battery with a deadly weapon resulting in significant bodily harm.

=== T ===
- James Michael Tait was a man involved in the 2005 Enumclaw horse sex case. Tait lived in Enumclaw, Washington and was among a local ring of zoophiles who filmed themselves while they had sex with horses. During one encounter, another member of the group named Kenneth Pinyan died after receiving anal penetration from a stallion whose penis caused perforation of the colon which led to acute peritonitis. As bestiality was not illegal in the State of Washington at that time, prosecutors only charged Tait with criminal trespass on the farm where the incident occurred. He entered an Alford plea and received a suspended one-year sentence, a $300 fine, one day of community service, and a permanent ban from the farm.

=== V ===
- Vince Vaughn – actor; with Scott Rosenberg, entered an Alford plea after altercation at a bar in North Carolina while filming Domestic Disturbance.

=== W ===
- West Memphis Three, Arkansas 2011. See Damien Echols, Jessie Misskelley, Jr. and Jason Baldwin. All three were convicted of the 1993 murders of three 8-year-old boys in 1994. In 2011 they agreed to an Alford plea to get Echols off death row and get out of prison. They maintain that they are innocent and will continue with their investigations on looking for the real killer and clear their names. As part of the deal, they were released that same day, they must serve 10 years probation, cannot seek civil litigations against the state, cannot profit off their story, and will be sent back to prison for another 21 years if they re-offend.

== See also ==
- Alternative pleading
- Deferred Adjudication
- Insanity defense
- Malum in se
- Malum prohibitum
- Peremptory plea
