= List of U.S. states by Alford plea usage =

North Carolina v. Alford (1970)

This list of U.S. states by Alford plea usage documents usage of the form of guilty plea known as the Alford plea in each of the U.S. states in the United States. An Alford plea (also referred to as Alford guilty plea and Alford doctrine) in the law of the United States is a guilty plea in criminal court, where the defendant does not admit the act and asserts innocence. Under the Alford plea, the defendant admits that sufficient evidence exists with which the prosecution could likely convince a judge or jury to find the defendant guilty beyond a reasonable doubt.

The Alford plea arose out of the 1970 case before the Supreme Court of the United States, North Carolina v. Alford, where the Court ruled that the defendant could be allowed to enter a guilty plea while still maintaining innocence. According to the United States Department of Justice, in 2000 a greater percentage of State inmates made use of the plea than Federal inmates. The state courts of Indiana, Michigan, and New Jersey do not allow usage of the plea. It has been used in other states, and in application of the plea process the courts require the plea to be of a voluntary nature and based on factual evidence. The courts make an effort to determine defendants are entering the plea by their own choice, and that there is a factual basis for the plea; they accomplish this by questioning the defendant about their choice and the prosecution about the potential case against the defendant. Once entered, the plea is treated as a standard guilty plea.

== Background ==
=== State usage ===
The Alford plea arose out of the 1970 case before the Supreme Court of the United States, North Carolina v. Alford. In that case, the Supreme Court ruled that the defendant could enter a plea of guilty while still asserting his innocence. The ruling of the Court stated that the defendant, "may voluntarily, knowingly, and understandingly consent to the imposition of a prison sentence even if he is unwilling or unable to admit his participation in the acts constituting the crime." This form of guilty plea has been frequently used in local and state courts in the United States; though it consists of a small percentage of all plea bargains in the U.S. In 2000 the United States Department of Justice noted, "About 17% of State inmates and 5% of Federal inmates submitted either an Alford plea or a no contest plea, regardless of the type of attorney. This difference reflects the relative readiness of State courts, compared to Federal courts, to accept an alternative plea."

Indiana, Michigan, and New Jersey forbid the usage of Alford pleas within their state court systems. Writing in Cornell Law Review, Stephanos Bibas described the position of the Indiana Supreme Court, "The Supreme Court of Indiana has held that judges may not accept guilty pleas accompanied by protestations of innocence. The court suggested that Alford pleas risk being unintelligent, involuntary, and inaccurate. Another reason for the Indiana rule is that Alford pleas undercut public respect for the justice system."

=== Functional application ===
"Most state courts hold that an Alford plea is the 'functional equivalent' of a regular plea of guilty."

— Criminal Evidence: Principles and Cases

According to the 2009 book Criminal Evidence: Principles and Cases by Thomas J. Gardner and Terry M. Anderson, "The Alford plea is not mandatory for states, but most states have adopted it. State judges, however, are generally not obligated to accept an Alford plea. Most judges do accept it because the sentence given is the same as the sentence for a regular guilty plea under the state sentencing guidelines." Criminal Evidence explained the application of the Alford plea in U.S. states, "Most state courts hold that an Alford plea is the 'functional equivalent' of a regular plea of guilty. Therefore, a defendant who enters a guilty plea, whether an Alford plea or a regular guilty plea, has lost almost all rights to appeal. Most courts hold that the only issues applicable are the voluntary and intelligent nature of the plea and the jurisdiction of the court."

In the 2008 book Criminal Procedure, author John M. Scheb pointed out that a majority of the states have initiated measures to make sure that the plea is entered into of the defendant's own accord, and that it is grounded in a factual basis. Scheb wrote, "Most states have adopted similar rules of procedure to ensure that pleas are voluntary and comply with constitutional requirements." He explained that judges have some discretion in determining the voluntary nature of the plea given by the defendant, "Rules concerning voluntariness and factual basis generally do not specify any precise method to be followed by the court. Judges employ various methods to determine voluntariness. Often these methods include interrogation of the defendant by the judge and sometimes by the prosecutor and defense counsel." Scheb noted that, "The objective is to establish that no improper inducements have been made to secure a plea, that the defendant understands the basic constitutional rights incident to a trial, that these rights are being waived, and that he or she comprehends the consequences of the plea." Scheb discussed the manner in which the court determines the factual basis for the plea, "In determining that a factual basis exists for the defendant's plea, judges often have the prosecutor briefly outline available proof to establish a prima facie case of the defendant's guilt. A more extensive inquiry is usually necessary for specific-intent crimes." Scheb emphasized the importance why it is necessary to establish a factual basis for the plea, before it is entered by the defendant: "The thoroughness of the court's determination of voluntariness and factual basis becomes important if a defendant later moves to withdraw a plea and enter a plea of not guilty."

== Table ==
=== U.S. states ===
Name	Used	Note
Alabama	Yes	"With an Alford plea, [defendant] maintained his innocence but acknowledged there was enough evidence to convict him." Associated Press (2002)
Alaska	Yes	"In such a plea, the defendant does not admit guilt, but acknowledges that prosecutors have enough evidence to obtain a guilty verdict." Fairbanks Daily News-Miner (2009)
Arizona	Yes	"Alford plea, in which a defendant does not admit guilt but agrees he might be convicted by a jury." The Arizona Daily Star (2003) "Under an Alford plea, a defendant does not admit guilt but acknowledges the prosecution has enough evidence to obtain a conviction." The Arizona Daily Star (1999)
Arkansas	Yes	"Under North Carolina v. Alford, 400 U.S. 25 (1970), a court may accept a guilty plea from a defendant who maintains his innocence, provided the court finds an adequate factual basis for the plea of guilty. Typically, a criminal defendant will utilize an Alford plea when he "intelligently concludes that his interests require entry of a guilty plea" in light of strong evidence of actual guilt with the intention of limiting the penalty to be imposed." Arkansas Supreme Court (2006)
California	Yes	Alford plea described as a "plea that allows the offender to admit that there is enough evidence to convict him at trial without admitting the offense of record." California State Library, research requested by California State Assembly member (2004)
Colorado	Yes	"[Defendant] took an Alford plea, which means he didn't admit guilt but agreed that prosecutors had enough evidence to convict him." The Gazette (2007) "[Defendant] entered an 'Alford plea' ... under which he did not admit guilt but acknowledged that enough evidence exists to convict him." Rocky Mountain News (2006)
Connecticut	Yes	"A plea in a criminal case in which the defendant does not admit guilt, but agrees that the state has enough evidence against him or her to get a conviction. Allows the defendant to enter into a plea bargain with the state. If the judge accepts the Alford Plea, a guilty finding is made on the record." State of Connecticut Judicial Branch (2009)
Delaware	Yes	"We now hold, in the light of the Alford case, that the rules laid down in Brown and Muzzi are amended to eliminate the requirement that a defendant must admit his actual commission of the offense charged in order for the trial Judge to accept his plea; if the other requirements laid down in Brown and Muzzi are met, the plea is to be accepted." Supreme Court of Delaware (1972)
Florida	Yes	Supreme Court of Florida has held that "a judgment of guilt entered upon an Alford plea is conclusive proof of guilt of the criminal offense charged". The Florida Bar v. Cohen (1991) Florida “allows for pleas of convenience as provided in North Carolina v. Alford, 400 U.S. 25, 91 S.Ct. 160, 27 L.Ed.2d 162 (1970).” Rule 3.172(e), Fla. R. Crim. P. (Committee Note).
Georgia	Yes	"[Defendant] entered an 'Alford plea,' in which he acknowledged there was enough evidence to find him guilty." The Atlanta Journal-Constitution (2006) "[Defendant] entered an 'Alford' plea, in which a defendant does not admit guilt but asserts that a guilty plea is in his best interest." The Atlanta Journal-Constitution (2004)
Hawaii	Yes	"While the Supreme Court has held that a guilty plea may be accepted by the trial court, and sentence may be pronounced thereon even where the defendant is unable or unwilling to admit to the commission of the act charged, North Carolina v. Alford, 400 U.S. 25, 91 S.Ct. 160, 27 L.Ed.2d 162 (1970), we think that where a tendered plea of guilty is accompanied by a contemporaneous denial of the acts constituting the crime charged, a searching inquiry addressed to the defendant personally, to ensure the defendant's complete understanding of the finality of his guilty plea if accepted, should be conducted by the trial court before accepting the plea. Only then, and only after satisfying itself that there is a strong factual basis for the plea, ought the trial court to accept the plea." Supreme Court of Hawaii (1980)
Idaho	Yes	"Although an Alford plea allows a defendant to plead guilty amid assertions of innocence, it does not require a court to accept those assertions. The sentencing court may, of necessity, consider a broad range of information, including the evidence of the crime, the defendant's criminal history and the demeanor of the defendant, including the presence or absence of remorse." Idaho Court of Appeals, State of Idaho v. Howry (1995)
Illinois	Yes	"Alford plea, in which [defendant] conceded that a judge or jury shown the evidence would probably find him guilty". Chicago Tribune (2008) "Alford plea – under which a defendant acknowledges there is enough evidence for a conviction without admitting wrongdoing." The Chicago Sun-Times (2006)
Indiana	No	"The Supreme Court of Indiana has held that judges may not accept guilty pleas accompanied by protestations of innocence. The court suggested that Alford pleas risk being unintelligent, involuntary, and inaccurate. Another reason for the Indiana rule is that Alford pleas undercut public respect for the justice system." Cornell Law Review (2003)
Iowa	Yes	"In an Alford plea, a defendant doesn't admit guilt but acknowledges there is enough evidence for a jury to convict him." Associated Press (2009) "In an Alford plea, a defendant does not admit guilt, but acknowledges that prosecutors have enough evidence to convict him at trial." Associated Press (2002)
Kansas	Yes	"An Alford plea is a plea to a criminal charge but without admitting to its commission, i.e., to the truth of the charge and every material fact therein. The defendant may accomplish this in two ways: by affirmatively protesting innocence or by simply refusing to admit the acts constituting the charge."
Kentucky	Yes	"In an Alford plea, a defendant doesn't admit guilt but acknowledges there is enough evidence for a conviction." The Kentucky Post (2007) "In an Alford plea, a defendant does not admit guilt but concedes there is enough evidence for conviction." Lexington Herald-Leader (2006)
Louisiana	Yes	"Under an Alford plea, a defendant maintains his innocence, but concedes he would likely be convicted if his case went to trial. The court treats the case as a guilty plea."The Advocate (1999) "In an Alford plea, the defendant does not admit he committed a crime, but believes it is in his best interest to plead guilty." The Advocate (1999)
Maine	Yes	"Alford plea, which allows her to plead guilty to the state's evidence while continuing, for the record, to maintain her innocence." Bangor Daily News (1998) "The defendants entered what is technically called an 'Alford plea,' in which they contend they are innocent, but admit that there is sufficient evidence for a jury to find them guilty, and it is in their best interests to plead guilty." Bangor Daily News (1994)
Maryland	Yes	"Under an Alford plea, the defendant does not admit guilt but acknowledges that the state has enough evidence for a conviction." The Maryland Gazette (2007) "Under an Alford plea, a defendant does not explicitly admit guilt but acknowledges prosecutors have enough evidence to convict." The Washington Post (1998)
Massachusetts	Yes	"[Defendant] invoked an Alford plea, which means he did not admit guilt but conceded prosecutors had enough evidence to convict him." The Republican (2001) "He entered an Alford plea, a type of plea in which a defendant doesn't admit guilt, but consents to a prison sentence, acknowledging that the state has a strong case." Boston Herald (2000)
Michigan	No	Alford pleas have been forbidden in Michigan courts. Cornell Law Review (2003)
Minnesota	Yes	Alford plea "a form of a guilty plea in which the defendant asserts innocence but acknowledges on the record that the prosecutor could present enough evidence to prove guilt." Minnesota House of Representatives (2009) "Alford Plea: A plea of guilty that may be accepted by a court even where the defendant does not admit guilt. In an Alford plea, defendant has to admit that he has reviewed the state's evidence, a reasonable jury could find him guilty, and he wants to take advantage of a plea offer that has been made. Court has discretion as to whether to accept this type of plea." Minnesota Judicial Branch (2009)
Mississippi	Yes	In an appeal from the Mississippi Court of Appeals, the appeals decision was reversed, and the acceptance of the defendant's Alford plea by the Lauderdale County Circuit Court was upheld. Supreme Court of Mississippi (2008)
Missouri	Yes	"In an Alford plea, a defendant does not admit guilt but acknowledges a likelihood of conviction if the case went to trial." The Kansas City Star (2009) "Under the plea, the [defendant] did not admit guilt but acknowledged the state had enough evidence for a conviction." Associated Press (2008)
Montana	Yes	In an appeal from the District Court of the Fourth Judicial District, a ruling denying defendant's motion to withdraw his Alford plea to the offense of felony robbery was affirmed. Montana Supreme Court (2008)
Nebraska	Yes	In an appeal from the District Court for Douglas County, a conviction and sentence of an individual who pleaded guilty by Alford plea was affirmed. Nebraska Court of Appeals (1993)
Nevada	Yes	"[Defendant] entered an Alford plea ... meaning she didn't admit wrongdoing but acknowledged there is enough evidence to convict her." Las Vegas Review-Journal (2009) "[Defendant] entered an Alford plea, which means he didn't admit guilt but acknowledged there was enough evidence to find him guilty if he went to trial.Las Vegas Review-Journal (2008)
New Hampshire	Yes	"[Defendant entered] an Alford plea, meaning that she maintained her innocence but admitted the state had sufficient evidence to convince a judge or jury she was guilty." New Hampshire Union Leader (2009) "By entering an 'Alford' plea, [defendant] conceded the prosecution probably would win the case, but he did not admit guilt." New Hampshire Union Leader (1994)
New Jersey	No	Alford pleas have been forbidden in New Jersey courts. Cornell Law Review (2003)
New Mexico	Yes	Alford plea defined as "a guilty plea entered by a defendant who simultaneously maintains his/her innocence and for purposes of these regulations is equivalent to a conviction." New Mexico Register (2001)
New York	Yes	"Such a plea is valid in New York State. ... In plea bargaining, the prosecutor has the right to make no plea offer. ... Thus, the prosecutor can refuse to accept an Alford as a plea to a lesser charge. However, where the defendant seeks to plead to the whole indictment via an Alford plea, the prosecutor has no right to stop this. A defendant has the right to plead to the entire accusatory instrument." Issues in NY Criminal Law (2008)
North Carolina	Yes	"With an Alford plea, the judge asks these two questions: 'Do you now consider it to be in your best interest to plead guilty?' and 'Do you understand that upon your 'Alford plea' you will be treated as being guilty whether or not you admit that you are in fact guilty?'" The News & Observer (2007) "[Defendant] agreed as part of an Alford plea in state court that evidence against him could result in a conviction." Associated Press (2007)
North Dakota	Yes	"In an Alford plea, a defendant does not admit guilt but acknowledges that sufficient evidence exists to convict." Grand Forks Herald (2006) "Under an Alford plea, a defendant does not admit guilt, but acknowledges there is enough evidence to convict her." Associated Press (1995)
Ohio	Yes	"In an Alford plea, the defendant maintains innocence or does not admit committing a crime. The court treats it as a guilty plea." The Blade (2009) "The Alford plea means [defendant] didn't admit guilt but acknowledged that enough evidence existed to convict him." Dayton Daily News (2008)
Oklahoma	Yes	"An Alford plea is not an admission of guilt. Rather, it is a recognition that enough evidence exists for a conviction." The Oklahoman (2009) "By entering an Alford plea, the defendant does not admit guilt but concedes the evidence against him likely would cause a jury to convict him." Associated Press (2005)
Oregon	Yes	"An Alford plea is a guilty plea in which the defendant does not admit commission of the criminal act or asserts that he is innocent. In such a situation, the trial court must determine that there is a factual basis for the plea." Oregon Court of Appeals (2005) "Under the plea, a defendant does not admit guilt but acknowledges that there is enough evidence for a conviction." The Oregonian (2007)
Pennsylvania	Yes	"Under an Alford plea ... [defendant] did not admit guilt but acknowledged the government had sufficient evidence to convict him." The Philadelphia Inquirer (2008) "[Defendant] entered the Alford plea, in which he did not admit guilt but acknowledged there was enough evidence to convict him". Bucks County Courier Times (2006)
Rhode Island	Yes	"In proceeding seeking post-conviction relief, record supported trial court's judgment that defendant's Alford plea was knowing and voluntary, and that defendant was present when trial court changed sentence from a fine to a fine plus incarceration." Rhode Island Supreme Court (2003)
South Carolina	Yes	A State Supreme Court case held that Alford guilty pleas were to be held valid in the absence of a specific on-the-record ruling that the pleas were voluntary – provided that the sentencing judge acted appropriately in accordance with the rules for acceptance of a plea made voluntarily by the defendant. The Court held that a ruling that the plea was entered into voluntarily is implied by the act of sentencing. South Carolina Supreme Court, State v. Gaines (1999)
South Dakota	Yes	"With the Alford plea, [defendant] maintains his innocence but concedes that if the evidence against him were to be presented to a jury or judge, he would probably be found guilty." Aberdeen American News (2003) "Under the Alford plea, [defendant] concedes that prosecutors had enough evidence to convict him ... but he does not admit to committing the crime." Aberdeen American News (2001)
Tennessee	Yes	"[Defendant] entered an Alford plea, or best-interests plea, in which he does not necessarily admit to the facts, but accepts the sentence rather than risk a trial. It has the same legal effect as a guilty plea." The Commercial Appeal (2006) "[Defendant] entered an Alford plea ... which means he believes there is sufficient evidence to convict him but he does not admit guilt." Associated Press (2005)
Texas	Yes	"[Defendant] entered an 'Alford plea' - which allows her to claim no guilt but concede the state's overwhelming evidence against her". The Dallas Morning News (1998)
Utah	Yes	"This plea may be used when the defendant wants the advantage of a plea bargain, but cannot or will not admit guilt. Instead, the defendant pleads to avoid the potential consequences of going to trial, and pleads without admitting guilt." Utah State Courts (2009) "[Alford] plea lets a defendant admit that prosecutors have enough evidence to convict him but permits the individual to maintain his innocence." The Deseret News (2003)
Vermont	Yes	"In an Alford plea ... defendant does not admit a crime but acknowledges that the state has enough evidence to get a conviction." Associated Press (2006)
Virginia	Yes	"An Alford plea means that [defendant] does not admit guilt but concedes that the state has enough evidence to convict him." The Roanoke Times (2009) "[Defendant] entered an Alford plea, not admitting guilt but conceding that the state had enough evidence to convict him." Richmond Times-Dispatch (2009) "A defendant who has entered an Alford plea is not an innocent person for the purposes of criminal sentencing and probation. To mitigate the possibility that an innocent person will so plead, a factual basis is required supporting the finding of guilt before an Alford plea can be accepted." Court of Appeals of Virginia (2009)
Washington	Yes	Alford plea "treated the same as a guilty finding". Washington State Department of Social and Health Services (2008) "Under an Alford plea, a defendant does not admit guilt but acknowledges there is enough evidence for a conviction." The Seattle Times (2003)
West Virginia	Yes	"In an Alford plea, a person maintains his innocence but acknowledges the state has enough evidence to convict him." Charleston Gazette (2002) Such a plea is called a Kennedy plea in West Virginia after a 1987 case in which the Supreme Court of Appeals of West Virginia upheld the use of the Alford plea.
Wisconsin	Yes	"A defendant's protestations of innocence under an Alford plea extend only to the plea itself. Whatever the reason for entering an Alford plea, the fact remains that when defendants enter such a plea, they become convicted offenders and are treated no differently than they would be had they gone to trial and been convicted by a jury." Analysis of Wisconsin Supreme Court decisions, Wisconsin Lawyer (1998); In a 1995 case, the Wisconsin Supreme Court upheld the use of the Alford plea in the state.
Wyoming	Yes	"[Defendant] entered an 'Alford plea' to the charges ... The plea means that he didn't admit the crimes, but acknowledged that there's enough evidence to convict him." Associated Press (2009) "[Defendant's] guilty plea is identified in the record as an Alford plea, i.e., a plea that allows an accused to voluntarily, knowingly, and understandingly consent to the imposition of a prison sentence even if he is unwilling or unable to admit his participation in the acts constituting the crime." Wyoming Supreme Court (2008)

=== Federal ===
Organization	Used	Note
United States Department of Justice	Yes	"In an Alford plea, the defendant agrees to plead guilty because he or she realizes that there is little chance to win acquittal because of the strong evidence of guilt." Defense Counsel in Criminal Cases (2000); Alford plea defined as: "when a the [sic] defendant maintains his or her innocence with respect to the charge to which he or she offers to plead guilty". Federal Rules of Criminal Procedure 11 (2008)
United States Armed Forces	No	The form of plea is not allowed in courts of the United States military.

==== United States courts of appeals ====
United States courts of appeals

District	Location	Used	Note
United States Court of Appeals for the Federal Circuit	Washington, D.C.	Yes	"Although we need not resolve the issue here, an Alford plea of guilty might arguably warrant more severe collateral consequences than a nolo contendere plea, because a court that receives the former, but not the latter, must independently determine that the plea has a factual basis. Alford, 400 U.S. at 36 n. 8 and 38 n. 10, 91 S.Ct. at 167 n. 8 and 167 n. 10. If a factual basis for an Alford plea is not set forth in the record, the acceptance of such a plea can be reversible error." Alex M. Crofoot v. United States Government Printing Office (1985)
United States Court of Appeals for the District of Columbia Circuit	Washington, D.C.	Yes	"Apparently the district court believed that a defendant who maintains his innocence simply is not permitted to plead guilty, but that is not the law. See Alford, 400 U.S. at 37. ... We need not rehearse all the evidence here, however; for we must leave it to the district court in its discretion to determine whether the evidence was sufficiently strong to justify an Alford plea." United States of America v. Rasheed Rashad (2005)
United States Court of Appeals for the First Circuit	Boston, Massachusetts	Yes	"Alford stands squarely for the proposition that the subjective belief in one's own innocence does not render a guilty plea constitutionally suspect as long as there are grounds for doubting the reliability of that belief and for calculating that one's defense at trial would most likely be unsuccessful." Allard v. Helgemoe (1978)
United States Court of Appeals for the Second Circuit	New York City	Yes	"As the plain language indicates, 'conviction' includes a guilty plea. An Alford plea is a guilty plea. ... The Court concluded there is no "material difference between a plea that refuses to admit commission of the criminal act and a plea containing a protestation of innocence when, as in the instant case, a defendant intelligently concludes that his interests require entry of a guilty plea and the record before the judge contains strong evidence of actual guilt." Id. at 37. Thus, an Alford plea is still a guilty plea and fits within the plain language of § 1101(a)(48)(A)." Abimbola v. Ashcroft (2004)
United States Court of Appeals for the Third Circuit	Philadelphia, Pennsylvania	Yes	Affirmed decision of lower court, where defendant had entered an Alford plea, citing North Carolina v. Alford. United States v. Ebel (2002)
United States Court of Appeals for the Fourth Circuit	Richmond, Virginia	Yes	Affirmed decision of lower court refusing to allow defendant to withdraw Alford plea. Court noted, "While we affirm the district court's conclusion that Richardson understood the Alford plea, we recognize the potential confusion, for the defendant entering an Alford plea, of a single Rule 11 hearing on both Alford and non-Alford pleas. Where practicable, then, we recommend that a district court either conduct separate hearings or make some specific inquiries to those offering to plead under Alford, to ensure that the implications of the plea are clearly understood." United States v. Richardson (1989)
United States Court of Appeals for the Fifth Circuit	New Orleans, Louisiana	Yes	Judge Carl E. Stewart writing for the Court held that an Alford guilty plea is a "variation of an ordinary guilty plea". Ballard v. Burton (2006)
United States Court of Appeals for the Sixth Circuit	Cincinnati, Ohio	Yes	"The so-called 'Alford plea' is nothing more than a guilty plea entered by a defendant who either: 1) maintains that he is innocent; or 2) without maintaining his innocence, 'is unwilling or unable to admit" that he committed "acts constituting the crime.' Alford, 400 U.S. at 37. Because we believe it is important to bear in mind that in either situation the defendant's plea is guilty, we will use the term "Alford-type guilty plea", rather than merely 'Alford plea.' ... An Alford-type guilty plea is a guilty plea in all material respects." United States v. Tunning (1995)
United States Court of Appeals for the Seventh Circuit	Chicago, Illinois	Yes	"This Court has recognized the Alford rule and made clear that a guilty plea accompanied by an assertion of innocence is properly accepted only if the record before the trial judge contains strong evidence of guilt." Higgason v. Clark (1993)
United States Court of Appeals for the Eighth Circuit	St. Louis, Missouri	Yes	Affirmed decision of lower court regarding defendant's challenge to his Alford plea. Griffini v. Mitchell (1994)
United States Court of Appeals for the Ninth Circuit	San Francisco, California	Yes	Court upheld Alford plea from trial court, "Courts should not accept Alford pleas without inquiring into the factual basis of the plea. See Alford, 400 U.S. at 37, 38. ... By inquiring into the factual basis for the plea, TR at 6-12, and going over each of the factual elements of the crime with the defendant, TR at 20-22, the trial court met the independent inquiry requirement." Commonwealth of the Northern Mariana Islands v. Cabrera (1992)
United States Court of Appeals for the Tenth Circuit	Denver, Colorado	Yes	"Under Alford, a defendant is permitted to enter a plea of guilty without admitting he committed the charged offense. 400 U.S. at 37-39. Thus, an Alford plea is a guilty plea and properly considered as a prior criminal conviction for purposes of the Sentencing Guidelines." United States v. Delgado-Lucio (2006)
United States Court of Appeals for the Eleventh Circuit	Atlanta, Georgia	Yes	"Once accepted by a court, it is the voluntary plea of guilt itself, with its intrinsic admission of each element of the crime, that triggers the collateral consequences attending that plea. Those consequences may not be avoided by an assertion of innocence. As long as the guilty plea represents a voluntary and intelligent choice among alternative courses of action open to the defendant, see Boykin v. Alabama, 395 U.S. 238, 242, 89 S.Ct. 1709, 1711, 23 L.Ed.2d 274 (1969), and a sufficient factual basis exists to support the plea of guilt, see Fed.R.Crim.P. 11(f), the collateral consequences flowing from an Alford plea are the same as those flowing from an ordinary plea of guilt." Blohm v. Commissioner of Internal Revenue (1993)

== See also ==
- Alternative pleading
- Deferred Adjudication
- Insanity defense
- Malum in se
- Malum prohibitum
- Peremptory plea
