= Deferred sentence =

Probation period

A deferred sentence is a sentence that is suspended until after a defendant has completed a period of probation. If the defendant fulfills the stipulations surrounding probation, a judge may then throw out the sentence and guilty plea, clearing the incident from their record. If the defendant violates probation, they must serve the full sentence immediately.

== United States ==
In the United States, a defendant must plead guilty to at least one of the crimes they are accused of in order to receive a deferred sentence. The promise of a deferred sentence is often traded in exchange for a guilty plea in plea bargains.

Deferred sentences are often given to first time offenders, or to those who have committed relatively minor crimes, although ultimately, the choice to defer a sentence is left to a judge's discretion.

=== New York ===
In New York State, a similar process is known as adjournment in contemplation of dismissal (ACOD). What typically happens in such a case is that the potential sentence is deferred for six months, and if the defendant stays out of trouble, the charge is dropped entirely with no public record of the offense.

A deferred sentence is not exactly the same as an ACOD. One of the primary differences is that receiving an ACOD requires no admission of guilt or plea of guilty, unlike a deferred sentence which requires such. Upon completion of the ACOD, the charges are automatically sealed, fingerprints and mugshots are destroyed, and the arrest is annulled. There is no conviction, and all rights that the defendant had prior to arrest are restored. To enter the deferred sentence program, a plea of guilt must be made. Even though successful completion of a deferred sentence results in a dismissal of charges and guilty plea withdrawal, most states still consider it to be a conviction since a plea of guilt was entered and the defendant was considered "convicted" for the duration of the program. Furthermore, completion of a deferred sentence program usually requires a request to the court to have the underlying charges and arrest sealed.

== See also ==
- Suspended sentence
- Deferred adjudication
