= Appeal to the law =

Type of logical fallacy

An appeal to the law (argumentum ad legem in Latin) is an informal fallacy in which someone tries to encourage or defend an action based on its legality, or condemn it as morally reprehensible, purely because it is illegal. This line of reasoning is faulty because although the law of the land is important, it does not necessarily match up with the morality or sensibility of an action. In reality, many statutorily forbidden acts are malum prohibitum rather than malum in se.

== Examples ==
- "So what if I cheated on my husband? It's not like being unfaithful is a crime!"
- "Filling your shoes with river water is cheap, simple and legal in all 50 states."
- "I think that routine circumcision is unethical, but my friend keeps arguing that because it's legal it must be ethical"

== See also ==
- Appeal to consequences
- Argument from authority
- Legal threat
- Circular reasoning
