= Valence Gale =

Journalist and founder of the Barbados Advocate

Valence Gale (1850-1909) was a Barbadian journalist and the founder and editor of The Barbados Advocate.

== Early life and education ==
Born in 1850, Gale was orphaned when he was 4, when both his parents died in the cholera epidemic of 1854, and he was raised by his aunt. He attended St Michael's Parochial School, Barbados.

== Journalism career ==
Aged 16, Gale served as an apprentice at the Barbados Agricultural Reporter, then the country's leading newspaper. The paper's editor took a shine to him and gave him numerous opportunities. When fellow reporter and friend, Conrad Reeves, resigned to study law, Gale took his place as legal reporter covering the Barbadian House of Assembly. Reeves would later become the country's Attorney-General and Chief Justice.

Nine years after he started working at the Barbados Agricultural Reporter, Gale became the paper's leader-writer. He became honorary secretary of the Defence Association, opposed to proposals by Governor John Pope-Hennessy to federate Barbados and the Windward Islands.

In 1888, Louis de Souza, a young barrister in British Guiana was imprisoned for six months for contempt of court for publicly criticising judicial decisions. De Souza contracted tuberculosis while in jail and died shortly after his release. His imprisonment was reported across the West Indies and his death elicited outrage. Gale in particular wrote passionately about the events leading up De Souza's death. One of his articles is credited with paving the way for the passage of Barbados' Contempt of Court Act 1891.

== Founder and editor of The Barbados Advocate ==
Gale established The Barbados Advocate in 1895 and served as its editor for 13 years until his death in 1908. When he died, he left controlling interest in the paper to his wife, Clara. Gale's brother-in-law, Charles Chenery, who had been assistant editor, took over as the paper's editor.

== Personal life and death ==
In 1890, Gale married Clara Alsop Chenery, cousin of Thomas Chenery the editor of The Times newspaper (London). The couple had one daughter and two sons. The couple's eldest son, Valence C. Gale, also served as manager from 1919 and later managing director of the Barbados Advocate. Son, C. A. Louis Gale, served as the paper's editor for 30 years from his uncle's death in 1925 until his own death in 1955.

Valence Gale died on 16 October 1908 at his home in Bridgetown. He was 58.

== Publications ==
- Article - Christmas in the West Indies, Greater Britain (London, England) Monday, 15 December 1890, Page 19
- Pamphlet - In Memoriam (Louis de Souza), 1899
- Pamphlet - Sketch of the Life and Career of the late Sir Conrad Reeves, 1902, which was the basis for the Dictionary of National Biography entry on Reeves.
