= ACOD =

ACOD may refer to:

- Adjournment in contemplation of dismissal, specific judicial order usually followed only by paperwork and ending of the legal process
- British Advisory Committee for Older and Disabled People, within Office of Communications (AKA Ofcom)
- A.C.O.D. (Adult Children of Divorce), 2013 American comedy film
