= Suspended sentence =

Deferred sentence of imprisonment

A suspended sentence is a sentence on conviction for a criminal offence, the serving of which the court orders to be deferred in order to allow the defendant to perform a period of probation. If the defendant does not break the law during that period and fulfills the particular conditions of the probation, the sentence is usually considered fulfilled. If the defendant commits another offence or breaks the terms of probation, the court can order the sentence to be served, in addition to any sentence for the new offence.

== Australia ==
In Australia, suspended sentences are commonly imposed in order to alleviate the strain on overcrowded prisons. For example, an individual may be sentenced to a six-month jail term, wholly suspended for six months; if they commit any other offence during that year, the original jail term is immediately applied in addition to any other sentence.

As of 1 September, 2014, suspended sentences no longer exist in Victoria, and in its place are community correction orders, which can be for a fixed term to ensure good behaviour.

== People's Republic of China ==
In the People's Republic of China (excluding Hong Kong and Macau), both suspended sentences and suspended sentencing (Chinese: 缓刑, also translated as a sentence "with reprieve") are featured in the criminal law. In the first situation, a fixed-term sentence of three years or below can be suspended. In the second situation, sentencing does not immediately follow the guilty verdict, but instead is determined after a period of probation.

Death sentences can also be suspended (called a "death sentence with reprieve"), so that an offender who does not intentionally re-offend during the two-year suspension period of release would have the sentence commuted to a life sentence.

== Finland ==
A suspended sentence is called ehdollinen vankeusrangaistus in Finnish, which translates to "conditional imprisonment". When a sentence of imprisonment, which can be at most two years, is imposed conditionally, the enforcement of the sentence is postponed for a probation period. The length of the probation period is at least one and at most three years. The probation period begins at the pronouncement or the issue of the judgment. When conditional imprisonment is imposed, the convicted person shall be notified, in connection with the pronouncement or the issue of the judgment, of the date when the probation period ends and of the grounds on which the sentence may be ordered to be enforced. A sentence of conditional imprisonment may be combined with fines or, if the sentence is longer than eight months, with community service of at least 14 and up to 120 hours. Additional surveillance of the convicted can also be ordered, if it is seen as necessary to reduce recurrent criminal behaviour.

The court may order the enforcement of conditional imprisonment if the convicted person commits an offence during the probation period and the charge has been brought within one year of the end of the probation period. In this event, the conditional sentence to be enforced, the sentence for the offence committed during the probation period and the sentences of imprisonment for the other offences considered in the same trial shall be joined as one unconditional sentence of imprisonment. The court may also order that conditional imprisonment be enforced only in part, in which case the remainder of the sentence shall continue to be conditional, subject to the same probation period.

== France ==
The Loi Béranger (Béranger bill) was introduced in March 26, 1891 in the French penal code. It was amended in 1958 and 1983. It allows for three types of suspended sentence:

- sursis simple (simple suspended sentence) – introduced in 1891. The only condition is to not commit any felony for a certain period of time after the final sentencing. Usually this period is five years. This can be proscribed to any legal entity, including companies and people.
- sursis probatoire (suspended sentence with probation) – introduced in 1958. It contains checks and balances, and may be combined with other requirements. Before 2020, this was known as sursis probatoire avec mise à l'épreuve.
- sursis assorti avec obligation d'accomplir un travail d'intéret géneral (suspended sentence combined with mandatory community service) – introduced in 1983.

== Germany ==
The Strafgesetzbuch (German Criminal Code) makes provision for suspended sentences for up to five years. When a defendant is sentenced to a prison sentence under one year, the default is suspension "if there are reasons to believe that the sentence itself will serve as sufficient warning to the convicted person". Courts can impose requirements on offenders (e.g. residency, non-contact, drug rehabilitation) as part of the suspended sentence, and combine it with a fine or order for restitution.

== Ireland ==
In the law of the Republic of Ireland, the common law power of courts to suspend sentences was replaced by Part 10 of the Criminal Justice Act 2006. Part of the provision was ruled unconstitutional by the High Court in 2016, because activation of a suspended sentence could sometimes be triggered by a subsequent conviction even if the latter was appealed. A 2017 amending act replaced the impugned procedure. There is no minimum or maximum term that can be suspended (excluding mandatory sentences). The period of suspension is typically equal to or less than the length of the sentence, but this is not an absolute rule; for example, the Court of Criminal Appeal has passed a sentence of 4 years suspended for 5 years.

== Japan ==
Suspended sentences (執行猶予, shikkō yūyo) are common practice in Japan and can be applied in cases where a sentence is for up to three years in prison and/or 500,000 yen in fines. Any criminal activity during the period of the suspended sentence will result in the cancellation of the sentence and imprisonment for the prescribed term.

== Russia ==
In Russia suspended sentence (Russian: условный срок, lit. 'conditional sentence or probation') is commonplace and its application is stipulated by an Article 73 of the Russian Criminal Code. The suspended sentences may not be applied to child offenders (minors aged 14 or less when the offence was committed), to those who have committed a serious or very serious crime (the definition of which is given by Article 15 of the same Code as of 2019), or in case of crime recurrence. The judge may also impose additional restrictions on how the probation must be served. Initial sentence is enforced in case of convicted failing to fulfill conditions of the probation.

== United Kingdom ==
=== England and Wales ===
In England and Wales, a custodial sentence may, at the discretion of the sentencing judge or magistrates, be suspended for up to two years if the term of imprisonment is under two years and the offender agrees to comply with court requirements, which may include a curfew, performing unpaid work (informally called "community service"), and/or engaging in an appropriate rehabilitation programme. In 2017, 5% of convictions resulted in a suspended sentence, compared to 7% immediate custodial sentences.

The sentencing guidelines indicate that it is appropriate for a sentence to be suspended if there is strong personal mitigation and/or a realistic prospect of rehabilitation, but suspended sentences should not be used for offenders who pose a risk to the public or who have a history of poor compliance with court orders.

Suspended sentences were introduced to English law by the Criminal Justice Act 1967.

The Sentencing Act 2026 now requires most short custodial sentences in England and Wales to be suspended.

== United States ==
In the United States, it is common practice for judges to hand down suspended sentences to first-time offenders who have committed a minor crime, and for prosecutors to recommend suspended sentences as part of a plea bargain. They are often given to mitigate the effect of penalties.

In some jurisdictions, the criminal record of the guilty party will still carry the offense, even after probation is adequately served. Suspending a sentence does not completely remove the conviction from a person's record. While it may be hidden from the public, it is not hidden from law enforcement. In other cases, the process of deferred adjudication prevents the conviction from appearing on a person's criminal record, once probation had been completed.

In military trials governed by the Uniform Code of Military Justice, officers meting out non-judicial punishment may suspend the punishment they order.

== See also ==
- Deferred sentence

== Sources ==
- Byrne, Hanna; Dempsey, Liam; O'Malley, Thomas (31 August 2020). "Suspended sentences". LRC Report Series (LRC 123-2020). Dublin: Law Reform Commission. ISSN 1393-3132.
