= Deferred prosecution =

Way to avoid prosecution

A deferred prosecution agreement (DPA), which is very similar to a non-prosecution agreement (NPA), is a voluntary alternative to adjudication in which a prosecutor agrees to grant amnesty in exchange for the defendant agreeing to fulfill certain requirements. A case of corporate fraud, for instance, might be settled by means of a deferred-prosecution agreement in which the defendant agrees to pay fines, implement corporate reforms, and fully cooperate with the investigation. Fulfillment of the specified requirements will then result in dismissal of the charges.

== United States ==
Since 1999, the United States Department of Justice (DOJ) has set forth guidelines concerning the prosecution of business organizations and corporations. The United States Attorneys' Manual (USAM) of the DOJ allows consideration of non-prosecution or deferred prosecution of corporate criminal offenses because of collateral consequences and discusses plea agreements, deferred prosecution agreements, and non-prosecution agreements in general. Under the U.S. Sentencing Guidelines, a past deferred prosecution will not count toward a defendant's criminal history, if there was no finding of guilt by a court and the defendant did not plead guilty or otherwise admit guilt in open court. This is in contrast to a deferred disposition, which typically does involve such a finding or admission.

According to professor Rachel Barkow and Anthony Barkow of NYU Law School, there has been a dramatic increase in the use of DPAs and NPAs by federal prosecutors, increasing from 11 instances between 1993 and 2001, to 23 between 2002 and 2005, to 66 between 2006 and 2008. This kind of regulation-by-prosecutor has also occurred at the state level, for example at the New York Attorney General's Office under Eliot Spitzer and Andrew Cuomo. Outside monitors are appointed in about half of all DPAs.

== United Kingdom ==
The United Kingdom introduced DPAs in February 2014, under the provisions of Schedule 17 of the Crime and Courts Act 2013. They enable the Serious Fraud Office (SFO) and Crown Prosecution Service (CPS) to enter into DPAs for fraud, bribery, and other economic crime. The SFO first used a DPA in November 2015 in SFO v Standard Bank Plc, and the CPS first used a DPA in December 2023 in R v Entain Plc.

== Canada ==
Discussions about the potential establishment of deferred prosecution agreement (DPA) legislation in Canada began in February 2016. Prior to the DPA, Canada already had prosecutorial discretion in place, which "made it possible for offending companies to negotiate a non-criminal penalty for a criminal act". In June 2018 Canada enacted a DPA through provisions in the omnibus budget implementation Bill C-74, that amended the Criminal Code. According to the Law Times, the DPA changes the way Canadian courts prosecute white-collar crime which includes a remediation system whereby offenders can avoid conviction if "they co-operate with the Crown and the courts". The Times cited Ottawa-based counsel Patrick McCann, who said that the DPA would "bring Canada in line with many other countries that have deferred prosecution agreements, including the U.S., the U.K. and most other European countries". According to McCann, the DPA "addresses the unfairness of the situation when you have a large company that has a rogue senior officer" who has committed a crime with the entire company getting blamed. McCann said that the DPA is fair to investors in companies who are innocent of any wrongdoing.

The legislation states that, in the case of Corruption of Foreign Public Officials Act, the prosecutor "must not consider the national economic interest, the potential effect on relations with a state other than Canada or the identity of the organization or individual involved."

== See also ==
- Adjournment in contemplation of dismissal
- Deferred Adjudication (term used within the State of Texas)
- Diversion program (deferred disposition)
- Miscarriage of justice
- Plea bargain
- Prosecutorial misconduct
- Selective prosecution
- Sentencing disparity
