= Murder of Taylor Behl =

2005 murder in Virginia, United States

Taylor Behl
- Born: October 13, 1987; Vienna, Virginia
- Died: September 6, 2005 (aged 17)
- Body discovered: Mathews County, Virginia
- Burial place: Union Cemetery; Leesburg, Loudoun County, Virginia, U.S.
- Known for: Murder victim

Taylor Marie Behl (/biːl/ BEEL; October 13, 1987 – September 6, 2005) was a 17-year-old college freshman from Vienna, Virginia. She moved to Richmond, Virginia, in August 2005 to attend Virginia Commonwealth University. About two weeks later on Labor Day, September 5, 2005, Behl disappeared. Acting on a tip one month later, VCU police located her remains at a rural area in Mathews County, Virginia. The case was an Internet cause célèbre.

== Case ==
Behl went missing on September 5, 2005. In the early morning of Saturday, September 17, 2005, Behl's car was found about a mile and a half from the VCU Campus. A tracking dog led police to Jesse Schultz, 22, who lived in the area where Behl's car was found; Schultz was eventually cleared. Police also questioned a former boyfriend of Behl with whom she had dinner on September 5, and other acquaintances.

Another of the last individuals to have seen Behl alive was Benjamin Fawley, a 38-year-old amateur photographer and self-described "Goth/skater from the 1980s." Fawley's alibi could not be confirmed, and after executing a search warrant police arrested him on September 23 for 16 counts of child pornography.

A surveillance video showed Behl and Fawley leaving Behl's dormitory together on the night she disappeared. Fawley later was convicted of her murder, in which he asphyxiated her with a plastic bag in her car. The Virginia medical examiner ruled her death a homicide.

He was convicted of first degree murder in January of 2006 but it was reduced to second degree murder in August 2006. At that time, Fawley's Alford plea to second degree murder was accepted and he was sentenced to thirty years in prison.

Ben Fawley is scheduled to be released from prison in 2031. He will be 64 years old. Taylor's friend, Erin Crabill, received a $20,000 reward for assisting the investigation. She established a fund for women in crisis, with part of the money, in honor of Taylor Behl.

== Use of internet ==
In September 2007, Chuck Cohen, a first sergeant with the Indiana State Police, told a class of 21 law enforcement agencies studying "how criminals often leave an online trail at social networking sites such as MySpace and Facebook" that the Taylor Behl case marked one of the first times that police narrowed down their suspect pool using a MySpace friends list. Cohen said that Fawley's Internet footprint eventually led police to Behl's body.

== See also ==
- List of kidnappings
- List of solved missing person cases (2000s)
