= Murder of Jason Gage =

2005 murder of a gay man in Iowa, United States

Jason Gage (1976 – March 11, 2005) was a 29-year-old gay man who was murdered in his apartment in Waterloo, Iowa, United States. The murder was compared by the national press to the slaying of Matthew Shepard and prompted a push for citywide laws protecting LGBT people.

== Background ==
Jason Gage was last seen alive on March 11, 2005, socializing with friends in Waterloo's downtown bars. Sometime that night he went home to his apartment in the Russell-Lamson building. With him was 23-year-old Joseph Lawrence. Gage was originally from Oelwein, Iowa. He'd lived in Chicago and Milwaukee before moving to Waterloo years earlier. He settled downtown, and worked waiting tables in the Italian restaurant of his apartment building. He enrolled at the College of Hair Design in Waterloo, Iowa, in January 2003, and his friends said he dreamed of working in a big city salon.

Lawrence was born in Seaford, Delaware. He was removed from his birth parents after severe abuse and spent several years in foster care before being adopted at age 5. He moved with his adoptive parents to Maryland, New Jersey, and then to Ohio. During his time in Ohio, he decided he no longer wanted to be adopted and moved back into foster care at age 16. From there, he moved to Phoenix, Arizona, and then on to New Mexico. In early 2003, Lawrence moved from Farmington, New Mexico, where he had been an oil worker to Cedar Falls, Iowa, to be with his girlfriend—Elizabeth Hostetler—who was six months pregnant with their child. The couple—who had been together for a year—decided to move to Cedar Falls, because Hostetler had many "lifelong friends" in the area who could help with the baby. Hostetler said she introduced Gage and Lawrence about a week before Gage's murder. Hostetler had met Gage through an acquaintance and had known him for about two years.

== Murder ==
Witnesses said Gage and Lawrence were together the night Gage was killed. They were seen at Kings & Queens, the local gay club, before heading to an after hours party at The Times Bar. The two left at some point and headed back to Gage's apartment. According to Hostetler, Gage told Lawrence that he could wait for a ride at his apartment two blocks away from The Times Bar. A female friend and roommate of Hostetler stated that Lawrence called late Friday or early Saturday asking for a ride home from downtown, because he "didn't like the hospitality of the place," and needed a ride or he was going to "end up in jail". An investigator said he received a call from a man who had been asked to give Lawrence a ride home from a downtown club. Lawrence never showed up for the ride, and the man said he later heard from Hostetler that Lawrence had beaten up Gage.

In the early hours of March 12, phone records show Lawrence sent several text messages to friends in Iowa and New Mexico via his cell phone. "I just killed a guy I think," one read. A second sent to Michael Bailey in New Mexico flashed "U need to call me soon." A phone conversation between Bailey and Lawrence, in which Lawrence said "some guy" tried to "hit on him real bad" and described "a fight that got way out of hand," indicated that Lawrence may not have known Gage was dead.

== Discovery and arrest ==
At 11:00 p.m. on March 14, 2005, Gage's body was found in his bed when police entered his apartment, after friends expressed their concern that Gage did not show up at work on Monday and had not been seen for three days. Gage had been bludgeoned in the head with a bottle and stabbed in the neck with a shard of glass. Hours later, 23-year-old Joseph Lawrence of Cedar Falls was arrested and charged with Gage's murder. Police said Lawrence admitted he had fought with Gage, hit him with a bottle, and stabbed him in the neck with a piece of glass. An autopsy revealed that Gage died from severe head injuries. Gage's body lacked any defensive wounds that would suggest he had warded off an attack. When police entered Gage's apartment, two glasses were out, suggesting that Gage and Lawrence had been drinking and watching television.

== Confession and motive ==
Lawrence gave a videotaped statement at the Waterloo police station after plain-clothes police officer went to the home he shared with Hostetler and asked him to come in for questioning. In a police affidavit, Lawrence acknowledged hitting Gage twice with a bottle and stabbing him with a piece of glass. Hostetler, Lawrence's fiancée, offered a motive when she said Lawrence told her Gage had made sexual advances. Hostetler said that Lawrence had gay friends, hung out with gay people, and did not have "violent tendencies." She said that Gage must have made physical advances, the incident would never have happened had Lawrence not been drunk. "This was not a hate crime," Hostetler said.

== Hate crime charge considered ==
The Iowa Code does not have a law defining murder based on racial or sexual bias as hate crime. Murder, regardless of motive, is punishable by life in prison without parole. Another state law mentioned in Lawrence's case, titled "violation of individual rights," prohibits assaults, vandalism and trespass for reasons of race, color, religion, ancestry, national origin, political affiliation, sex, sexual orientation, age, or disability. In trial information formally charging Lawrence with murder, the prosecutor included a theory that Lawrence killed Gage while committing the crime of assault in violation of individual rights.

== Community response ==
Following Gage's death, the Waterloo Human Rights Commission asked the City Council to add sexual orientation protections to the city's human rights ordinance, permissible under Iowa state law. Waterloo Mayor Tim Hurley joined the commission in condemning Gage's murder, in a press conference outside the commission's offices, but said he had not formed an opinion on the addition of sexual orientation to the city's human rights ordinance.

Gage's friends held candlelight vigils outside his apartment building, and his family and classmates held a memorial outside of the beauty school. His wake in Oelwein was attended by hundreds, and his funeral drew a crowd too large for the funeral home where it was held. Friends and community members started a scholarship in Gage's name, and sold T-shirts and buttons with his image to raise money. Three area churches took up collections for Gage.

A benefit to raise money for the scholarship fund was held at the city convention center and attracted numerous attendees. It also attracted protesters from the Westboro Baptist Church in Topeka, Kansas. About 20 Westboro members picketed six area churches and stood outside the convention center carrying signs and shouting that Gage was in hell. They were then joined by a second group, Consuming Fire Campus Ministries, led by Matt Bourgault.

== Plea and sentencing ==
On December 16, 2005, as part of a plea agreement, Joseph Lawrence entered an Alford plea in the case of Jason Gage's murder. The plea allowed Lawrence to avoid admitting guilt while acknowledging that he would likely have been found guilty of Gage's murder had the case gone to trial. Originally charged with first degree murder, which would have meant a life sentence without parole, Lawrence pleaded to the lesser charge of second degree murder. As part of the plea agreement, Lawrence also waived his right to appeal the plea and the sentence, and to pay a $150,000 civil penalty to Gage's estate. After entering his plea, Lawrence added "I have nothing appropriate to say," and sat silent during his sentencing. Judge Bruce Zager sentenced Lawrence to 50 years, which was the mandatory punishment under Iowa law. Lawrence must serve at least 70 percent—35 years—of his sentence before he is eligible for parole.
