= Contempt of court =

Offense of disobedience or disrespect in court

Contempt of court, often referred to simply as "contempt", is the crime of being disobedient to or disrespectful toward a court of law and its officers in the form of behavior that opposes or defies the authority, justice, and dignity of the court. A similar attitude toward a legislative body is termed contempt of Parliament or contempt of Congress. The verb for "to commit contempt" is contemn (as in "to contemn a court order") and a person guilty of this is a contemnor or contemner.

There are broadly two categories of contempt: being disrespectful to legal authorities in the courtroom, or willfully failing to obey a court order. Contempt proceedings are especially used to enforce equitable remedies, such as injunctions. In some jurisdictions, the refusal to respond to subpoena, to testify, to fulfill the obligations of a juror, or to provide certain information can constitute contempt of the court.

When a court decides that an action constitutes contempt of court, it can issue an order in the context of a court trial or hearing that declares a person or organization to have disobeyed or been disrespectful of the court's authority, called "found" or "held" in contempt. That is the judge's strongest power to impose sanctions for acts that disrupt the court's normal process.

A finding of being in contempt of court may result from a failure to obey a lawful order of a court, showing disrespect for the judge, disruption of the proceedings through poor behavior, or publication of material or non-disclosure of material, which in doing so is deemed likely to jeopardize a fair trial. A judge may impose sanctions such as a fine, jail or social service for someone found guilty of contempt of court, which makes contempt of court a process crime. Judges in common law systems usually have more extensive power to declare someone in contempt than judges in civil law systems.

== In use today ==
Contempt of court is essentially seen as a form of disturbance that may impede the functioning of the court. The judge may impose fines and/or jail time upon any person committing contempt of court. The person is usually let out upon an agreement to fulfill the wishes of the court. Civil contempt can involve acts of omission. The judge will make use of warnings in most situations that may lead to a person being charged with contempt if the warnings are ignored. It is relatively rare that a person is charged for contempt without first receiving at least one warning from the judge. Constructive contempt, also called consequential contempt, is when a person fails to fulfill the will of the court as it applies to outside obligations of the person. In most cases, constructive contempt is considered to be in the realm of civil contempt due to its passive nature.

Indirect contempt is something that is associated with civil and constructive contempt and involves a failure to follow court orders. Criminal contempt includes anything that could be considered a disturbance, such as repeatedly talking out of turn, bringing forth previously banned evidence, or harassment of any other party in the courtroom, including committing an assault against the defendant in a criminal case. There have been instances during murder trials that grieving family members of murder victims have attacked the defendants in courtrooms in plain view of judges, bailiffs, and jurors, leading to said family members to be charged with contempt. Direct contempt is an unacceptable act in the presence of the judge (in facie curiae), and generally begins with a warning; it may be accompanied by the immediate imposition of a punishment.

=== Australia ===
In Australia, a judge may impose a fine or jail for contempt of court.

=== Belgium ===
A Belgian correctional or civil judge may immediately try the person for insulting the court.

=== British West Indies ===
In 1888, Louis de Souza, a young barrister in British Guiana was fined $500 and imprisoned for six months for contempt of court for publicly criticising judicial decisions. De Souza applied for special leave to appeal his case to the Privy Council as the decisions that he had criticised were not ongoing or cases in which he appeared and, therefore, broader than disrespect to legal authorities in a courtroom. A few years earlier, in Grenada, a newspaper had also been sanctioned for defaming a judge by printing remarks about a case.

The Privy Council granted De Souza's leave, with the judges apparently remarking that judges in England are subjected to far worse. De Souza, however, contracted tuberculosis while in jail and died 3 months after his release. His imprisonment was reported across the West Indies and his death elicited outrage. Valence Gale, a Barbadian journalist, wrote passionately about the events leading up De Souza's death. One of his articles is credited with paving the way for the passage of Barbados' Contempt of Court Act 1891, the first of many across the West Indies.

=== Canada ===
==== Common law offense ====
In Canada, contempt of court is an exception to the general principle that all criminal offences are set out in the federal Criminal Code. Contempt of court is the only remaining common law offence in Canada.

Contempt of court includes the following behaviors:

- Failing to maintain a respectful attitude, failing to remain silent or failing to refrain from showing approval or disapproval of the proceeding
- Refusing or neglecting to obey a subpoena
- Willfully disobeying a process or order of the court
- Interfering with the orderly administration of justice or impairing the authority or dignity of the court
- Failing to perform duties as an officer of the court
- A sheriff or bailiff not executing a writ of the court forthwith or not making a return thereof

==== Canadian Federal courts ====
This section applies only to the Federal Court of Appeal and Federal Court.

Under Federal Court Rules, Rules 466, and Rule 467 a person who is accused of Contempt needs to be first served with a contempt order and then appear in court to answer the charges. Convictions can only be made when proof beyond a reasonable doubt is achieved.

If it is a matter of urgency or the contempt was done in front of a judge, that person can be punished immediately. Punishment can range from the person being imprisoned for a period of less than five years or until the person complies with the order or fine.

==== Tax Court of Canada ====
Under Tax Court of Canada Rules of Tax Court of Canada Act, a person who is found to be in contempt may be imprisoned for a period of less than two years or fined. Similar procedures for serving an order first is also used at the Tax Court.

==== Provincial courts ====
Different procedures exist for different provincial courts. For example, in British Columbia, a justice of the peace can only issue a summons to an offender for contempt, which will be dealt with by a judge, even if the offence was done in the face of the justice.

=== Hong Kong ===
Judges from the Hong Kong Court of Final Appeal, High Court of Hong Kong, District Court along with members from the various tribunals and Coroner's Court all have the power to impose immediate punishments for contempt in the face of the court, derived from legislation or through common law:

- Insult a judge or justice, witness or officers of the court
- Interrupts the proceedings of the court
- Interfere with the course of justice
- Misbehaves in court (e.g., use of mobile phone or recording devices without permission)
- Juror who leaves without permission of the court during proceedings
- Disobeying a judgment or court order
- Breach of undertaking
- Breach of a duty imposed upon a solicitor by rules of court

The use of insulting or threatening language in the magistrates' courts or against a magistrate is in breach of section 99 of the Magistrates Ordinance (Cap 227) which states the magistrate can 'summarily sentence the offender to a fine at level 3 and to imprisonment for 6 months.'

In addition, certain appeal boards are given the statutory authority for contempt by them (e.g., Residential Care Home, Hotel and Guesthouse Accommodation, Air Pollution Control, etc.). For contempt in front of these boards, the chairperson will certify the act of contempt to the Court of First Instance who will then proceed with a hearing and determine the punishment.

=== England and Wales ===
In England and Wales (a common law jurisdiction), the law on contempt is partly set out in case law (common law), and partly codified by the Contempt of Court Act 1981. Contempt may be classified as criminal or civil. The maximum penalty for criminal contempt under the 1981 Act is committal to prison for two years.

Disorderly, contemptuous or insolent behaviour toward the judge or magistrates while holding the court, tending to interrupt the due course of a trial or other judicial proceeding, may be prosecuted as "direct" contempt. The term "direct" means that the court itself cites the person in contempt by describing the behaviour observed on the record. Direct contempt is distinctly different from indirect contempt, wherein another individual may file papers alleging contempt against a person who has willfully violated a lawful court order.

There are limits to the powers of contempt created by rulings of European Court of Human Rights. Reporting on contempt of court, the Law Commission commented that "punishment of an advocate for what he or she says in court, whether a criticism of the judge or a prosecutor, amounts to an interference with his or her rights under article 10 of the ECHR" and that such limits must be "prescribed by law" and be "necessary in a democratic society", citing Nikula v Finland.

==== Criminal contempt ====
The Crown Court is a superior court according to the Senior Courts Act 1981 and as such has the power to punish contempt. The Divisional Court as part of the High Court has ruled that this power can apply in these three circumstances:

1. Contempt "in the face of the court" (not to be taken literally; the judge does not need to see it, provided it took place within the court precincts or relates to a case currently before that court);
2. Disobedience of a court order; and
3. Breaches of undertakings to the court.

Where it is necessary to act quickly, a judge may act to impose committal (to prison) for contempt.

Where it is not necessary to be so urgent, or where indirect contempt has taken place the Attorney General can intervene and the Crown Prosecution Service will institute criminal proceedings on his behalf before a Divisional Court of the King's Bench Division of the High Court of Justice of England and Wales. For example, in January 2012, Theodora Dallas, a juror who had researched information on the internet was jailed for contempt of court. Initially searching for the meaning of the term "grievous bodily harm", she added search criteria which localised her search and brought to light another charge against the defendant. Because she then shared this information with the other jurors, the judge stated that she had compromised the defendant's right to a fair trial and the prosecution was abandoned. (Today such conduct could, with the consent of the attorney general, be dealt with as an offence under section 20A of the Juries Act 1974, as amended by the Criminal Justice and Courts Act 2015.)

Magistrates' courts also have powers under the 1981 Act to order to detain any person who "insults the court" or otherwise disrupts its proceedings until the end of the sitting. Upon contempt being admitted or proved the (invariably) district judge (presiding in a magistrates' court) may order committal to prison for a maximum of one month, impose a fine of up to £2,500, or both.

It will be contempt to bring an audio recording device or picture-taking device of any sort into an English court without the consent of the court.

It will not be contempt according to section 10 of the Act for a journalist to refuse to disclose his sources, unless the court has considered the evidence available and determined that the information is "necessary in the interests of justice or national security or for the prevention of disorder or crime".

==== Strict liability contempt ====
Under the Contempt of Court Act it is criminal contempt to publish anything which creates a real risk that the course of justice in proceedings may be seriously impaired. It only applies where proceedings are active, and the Attorney General has issued guidance as to when he believes this to be the case, and there is also statutory guidance. The clause prevents the newspapers and media from publishing material that is too extreme or sensationalist about a criminal case until the trial or linked trials are over and the juries have given their verdicts.

Section 2 of the Act limits the scope of strict liability contempt (which was previously based upon a presumption that any conduct could be treated as contempt, regardless of intent) to only instances where there can be proved a substantial risk of serious impediment or prejudice to the administration of justice (e.g., the conduct of a trial) which arose while proceedings were active.

==== Civil contempt ====
In civil proceedings there are two main ways in which contempt is committed:

1. Failure to attend at court despite a summons requiring attendance. In respect of the High Court, historically a writ of latitat would have been issued, but now a bench warrant is issued, authorizing the tipstaff to arrange for the arrest of the individual, and imprisonment until the date and time the court appoints to next sit. In practice a groveling letter of apology to the court is sufficient to ward off this possibility, and in any event the warrant is generally "backed for bail"—i.e., bail will be granted once the arrest has been made and a location where the person can be found in future established.
2. Failure to comply with a court order. A copy of the order, with a "penal notice"—i.e., notice informing the recipient that if they do not comply they are subject to imprisonment—is served on the person concerned. If, after that, they breach the order, proceedings can be started and in theory the person involved can be sent to prison. In practice this rarely happens as the cost on the claimant of bringing these proceedings is significant and in practice imprisonment is rarely ordered as an apology or fine are usually considered appropriate.

=== India ===
In India, contempt of court is of two types:

1. Civil contempt: Under Section 2(b) of the Contempt of Courts Act of 1971, civil contempt has been defined as wilful disobedience to any judgment, decree, direction, order, writ or other process of a court or wilful breach of an undertaking given to a court.
2. Criminal contempt: Under Section 2(c) of the Contempt of Courts Act of 1971, criminal contempt have been defined as the publication (whether by words, spoken or written, or by signs, or by visible representation, or otherwise) of any matter or the doing of any other act whatsoever which:
  1. Scandalises or tends to scandalise, or lowers or tends to lower the authority of, any court, or
  2. Prejudices, or interferes or tends to interfere with the due course of any judicial proceeding, or
  3. Interferes or tends to interfere with, or obstructs or tends to obstruct, the administration of justice in any other manner.

=== United States ===
In United States jurisprudence, acts of contempt are generally divided into direct or indirect, and civil or criminal. Direct contempt occurs in the presence of a judge; civil contempt is "coercive and remedial" as opposed to punitive. In the United States, relevant statutes include 18 U.S.C. §§ 401–403 and Federal Rule of Criminal Procedure 42.

1. Direct contempt is that which occurs in the presence of the presiding judge (in facie curiae) and may be dealt with summarily: the judge notifies the offending party that he or she has acted in a manner which disrupts the tribunal and prejudices the administration of justice. After giving the person the opportunity to respond, the judge may impose the sanction immediately.
2. Indirect contempt occurs outside the immediate presence of the court and consists of disobedience of a court's prior order. Generally a party will be accused of indirect contempt by the party for whose benefit the order was entered. A person cited for indirect contempt is entitled to notice of the charge and an opportunity for hearing of the evidence of contempt and, since there is no written procedure, may or may not be allowed to present evidence in rebuttal.

Contempt of court in a civil suit is generally not considered to be a criminal offense, with the party benefiting from the order also holding responsibility for the enforcement of the order. However, some cases of civil contempt have been perceived as intending to harm the reputation of the plaintiff, or to a lesser degree, the judge or the court.

Sanctions for contempt may be criminal or civil. If a person is to be punished criminally, then the contempt must be proven beyond a reasonable doubt, but once the charge is proven, then punishment (such as a fine or, in more serious cases, imprisonment) is imposed unconditionally. The civil sanction for contempt (which is typically incarceration in the custody of the sheriff or similar court officer) is limited in its imposition for so long as the disobedience to the court's order continues: once the party complies with the court's order, the sanction is lifted. The imposed party is said to "hold the keys" to their own cell, thus conventional due process is not required. In federal and most state courts, the burden of proof for civil contempt is clear and convincing evidence, a lower standard than in criminal cases.

In civil contempt cases, there is no principle of proportionality. In Chadwick v. Janecka (3d Cir. 2002), a U.S. court of appeals held that H. Beatty Chadwick could be held indefinitely for his failure to produce $2.5 million as a state court ordered in a civil trial. Chadwick had been imprisoned for nine years at that time and continued to be held in prison until 2009, when a state court set him free after 14 years, making his imprisonment the longest on a contempt charge to date.

Civil contempt is only appropriate when the imposed party has the power to comply with the underlying order. Controversial contempt rulings have periodically arisen from cases involving asset protection trusts, where the court has ordered a settlor of an asset protection trust to repatriate assets so that the assets may be made available to a creditor. A court cannot maintain an order of contempt where the imposed party does not have the ability to comply with the underlying order. This claim when made by the imposed party is known as the "impossibility defense".

Contempt of court is considered a prerogative of the court, and "the requirement of a jury does not apply to 'contempts committed in disobedience of any lawful writ, process, order, rule, decree, or command entered in any suit or action brought or prosecuted in the name of, or on behalf of, the United States.'" This stance is not universally agreed with by other areas of the legal world, and there have been many calls to have contempt cases to be tried by jury, rather than by judge, as a potential conflict of interest rising from a judge both accusing and sentencing the defendant. At least one Supreme Court justice has made calls for jury trials to replace bench trials on contempt cases.

The United States Marshals Service is the agency component that first holds all federal prisoners. It uses the Prisoner Population Management System / Prisoner Tracking System. The only types of records that are disclosed as being in the system are those of "federal prisoners who are in custody pending criminal proceedings." The records of "alleged civil contemnors" are not listed in the Federal Register as being in the system leading to a potential claim for damages under The Privacy Act, 5 U.S.C. § 552a(e)(4)(I).

In Ex parte Grossman (1925), the U.S. Supreme Court held that the U.S. president may pardon criminal contempt of court.

==== News media in the United States ====
In the United States, because of the broad protections granted by the First Amendment, with extremely limited exceptions, unless the media outlet is a party to the case, a media outlet cannot be found in contempt of court for reporting about a case because a court cannot order the media in general not to report on a case or forbid it from reporting facts discovered publicly. Newspapers cannot be closed because of their content.

==== Criticism ====
There have been criticisms over the practice of trying contempt from the bench. In particular, Supreme Court Justice Hugo Black wrote in a dissent, "It is high time, in my judgment, to wipe out root and branch the judge-invented and judge-maintained notion that judges can try criminal contempt cases without a jury."

== See also ==
- Contempt of cop
- Contumacy
- Judicial discretion
- Lèse-majesté
- Perjury
- Perverting the course of justice
- Obstruction of justice
- Offence of scandalizing the court in Singapore
