= Process crime =

Offense against the judicial process

In United States criminal procedure terminology, a process crime is an offense against the judicial process. These crimes include failure to appear, false statements, obstruction of justice, contempt of court and perjury.

Process crimes are sometimes a basis for a "pretextual prosecution", in which prosecutors bring process crime charges against a defendant in order to punish them for another crime for which a conviction is more difficult to obtain.

== Definition ==
Process crimes are the offenses that "interfere with the procedures and administration of justice". They are prosecuted because they are considered to harm the public interest in the functioning and integrity of the judicial system.

There is a broad range of process crimes, covered in the U.S. by a variety of federal and state laws. The five "archetypal" process charges are failure to appear, false statements, obstruction of justice, contempt of court and perjury. Persons who do not cooperate with an arrest may be charged with such process crimes as resisting arrest, flight to elude arrest or battery on police officers.

In U.S. legal literature, prosecutions for process crimes are covered largely as a phenomenon of federal criminal law. But they are also frequently prosecuted in state courts.

== Pretextual prosecutions ==
Process crimes lend themselves to being prosecuted regardless of the actual harm done to the furtherance of justice. They are therefore frequently a basis for "pretextual prosecutions", a prosecutorial tactic in which "prosecutors target defendants based on suspicion of one crime but prosecute them for another". The classic example is the pretextual prosecution of the gangster Al Capone for tax evasion rather than for his many other crimes in 1931.

To prosecutors, process crimes are particularly suitable for such purposes because they "carry a strong veneer of legitimacy" (i.e., most people agree that lying in court should be punishable), because they carry significant penalties, and because the prosecution is able to help produce these crimes. For instance, prosecutors can set up situations such as grand jury hearings or discovery requests in which process crimes – lies and omissions – tend to frequently occur. Process crimes also tend to be easier to prove than other crimes, and they often do not present a statute of limitations problem because they can arise late in the investigation of another crime that is more difficult to prove.

Examples in which process crimes are used for pretextual prosecutions include using "dissuading a witness" charges to sanction domestic abusers, or contempt charges for violating court orders to stay away from a place or person to punish suspected street criminals. On occasion, prosecutors may even go beyond a pretextual prosecution (through which they seek to sanction a real, if perhaps unprovable, offense) and use process crime charges merely to punish a defendant for their perceived obstinacy or insubordination.
