= Adjournment in contemplation of dismissal =

Court ruling to defer the disposition of a defendant's case

In criminal procedure, an adjournment in contemplation of dismissal (ACD or ACOD) allows a court to defer the disposition of a defendant's case, with the potential that the defendant's charge will be dismissed if the defendant does not engage in additional criminal conduct or other acts prohibited by the court as a condition of the ACD. The defendant subject to the adjournment in contemplation of dismissal is restored to the status he or she occupied prior to arrest, either during or after the period of adjournment that accompanies the ACD: that is, all records of the arrest and after the period for which the ACD applies; however, in many jurisdictions a local law enforcement record of the arrest is retained by default, unless that record is explicitly expunged.

The judge adjourning in contemplation of dismissal may impose specific conditions on the defendant subject to the ACD, which may include community service, drug rehabilitation, making restitution with a victim of the circumstances, avoiding contact with the victim, or completing some other diversion program. It may also be accompanied by an admonition to abstain from wanton, injurious, criminal, abusive or disruptive behavior. On the acceptance of the ACD and its without disposition and the defendant is released without bail condition.

== Application and surrounding process ==
The burden of proof in the court systems which employ the system of ACD rests with the people (that is, the prosecution). If evidence demonstrating guilt is not presented, the matter is deemed dismissed, and the ACD proceeds along its standard course of action.

== United States ==
In United States criminal law, adjournment in contemplation of dismissal may be offered to a defendant in the interest of justice with a view toward ultimate dismissal of the charge. When available, and granted to a defendant, the judge normally adjourns the case for a period time, often in the range of six months to a year, after which time the case will be dismissed as long as the defendant has stayed out of trouble (i.e., has not been arrested again). In most jurisdictions an ACOD is not classified as a form of probation, and if successfully completed the defendant does not receive a conviction.

Adjournment in contemplation of dismissal may be called by different names in other states. In Maryland, it is termed probation before judgment. In Alabama a similar procedure is called pre-trial diversion or deferred prosecution. In New Jersey, it is called "pre-trial intervention", and if it is a drug related charge it is then called a "conditional discharge".

=== New York ===
In New York State, a case subject to an ACD is normally dismissed and sealed on the date of adjournment, except on objection from the prosecution.

There is a separate provision for ACDs involving marijuana in the state of New York, under CPL 170.56.

== See also ==
- Deferred adjudication
