= Louis de Souza =

Late 19th century West Indian barrister

Louis Jessamy de Souza Aranha (1858-1889) was an outspoken West Indian barrister who challenged judicial excesses in British Guiana (current day Guyana).

== Early life and education ==
De Souza was born in Inagua, Bahamas, the son of Francis Jessamy Aranha, a businessman of Portuguese-Brazilian descent. Aged 16, De Souza travelled to Barbados to visit two aunts. Instead, he settled there and later went to work as a clerk at J. H. Fitt & Co.

In 1877, he travelled to London to study law, where he clerked for the West Indian-born lawyer, Judah Benjamin, before joining Lincoln's Inn. In 1880, he was awarded an Inn scholarship in equity jurisprudence worth 50 guinea.

== Legal career ==
De Souza was called to the Bar of England and Wales on 11 May 1881. Assertive and principled, De Souza frequently challenged authority.

In 1886, De Souza travelled to Canada to practise, where he was told he would have to re-qualify. For seven months, De Souza argued that lawyers should be recognised across the British Empire and fought for recognition without the need to re-qualify, leading to the passage of the De Souza Act.

De Souza and his wife settled soon afterwards in Demerara, British Guiana where he set up practise.

== British Guiana, judicial challenges and death ==
Outspoken, De Souza criticised several judicial decisions, with some of his remarks being published in the local papers, and called on the Secretary of State for the Colonies to appoint a Commission of Inquiry. For his impertinence, he was fined $500 and imprisoned in July 1898 for contempt of court for six months.

De Souza applied for special leave to appeal his imprisonment to the Privy Council as the cases on which he commented were decided cases and, therefore, should not have been the basis for a contempt of court charge. The Privy Council granted leave and De Souza was released on 5 December 1888. However, he would not live to argue his case before the Court. Having contracted tuberculosis in jail, De Souza returned to Barbados to recover. He died on 9 March 1889. He was only 30.

De Souza's death was reported in newspapers in the Bahamas, Barbados, British Guiana, Dominica, St Croix, St Lucia, and Trinidad and sparked outraged across the West Indies. His case was also the subject of a number of Parliamentary Questions in the UK House of Commons. His case raised ire over the misuse of judicial power and limitations on freedom of speech and freedom of the press because it suggested that no one could criticise a judicial decision even after a decision was handed down. His efforts would inspired reforms in judicial accountability and the passage of Contempt of Court Acts across the West Indies. The case has also been called "a landmark case in Guyana's legal history".

== Personal life ==
In 1886, De Souza married Gloucestershire-born Mary Peterson. His wife died in October 1888 while De Souza was imprisoned for contempt. To add insult to injury, when De Souza applied to the Court for leave to attend his wife's funeral, he was denied. The funeral procession, however, passed the jail. On being released, De Souza visited his wife's grave before returning home.

== Publications ==
=== Pamphlets ===
- A Letter on the Administration of Justice in British Guiana, Addressed to the Secretary of State (1887)
- Physician Heal Thyself (1888): A commentary on the two cases in re De Souza, no. I., and re De Souza, no. II, for contempt of court: together with a few remarks on the administration of justice in British Guiana
