= Guilt (law) =

State of being responsible for a crime per the state's rules

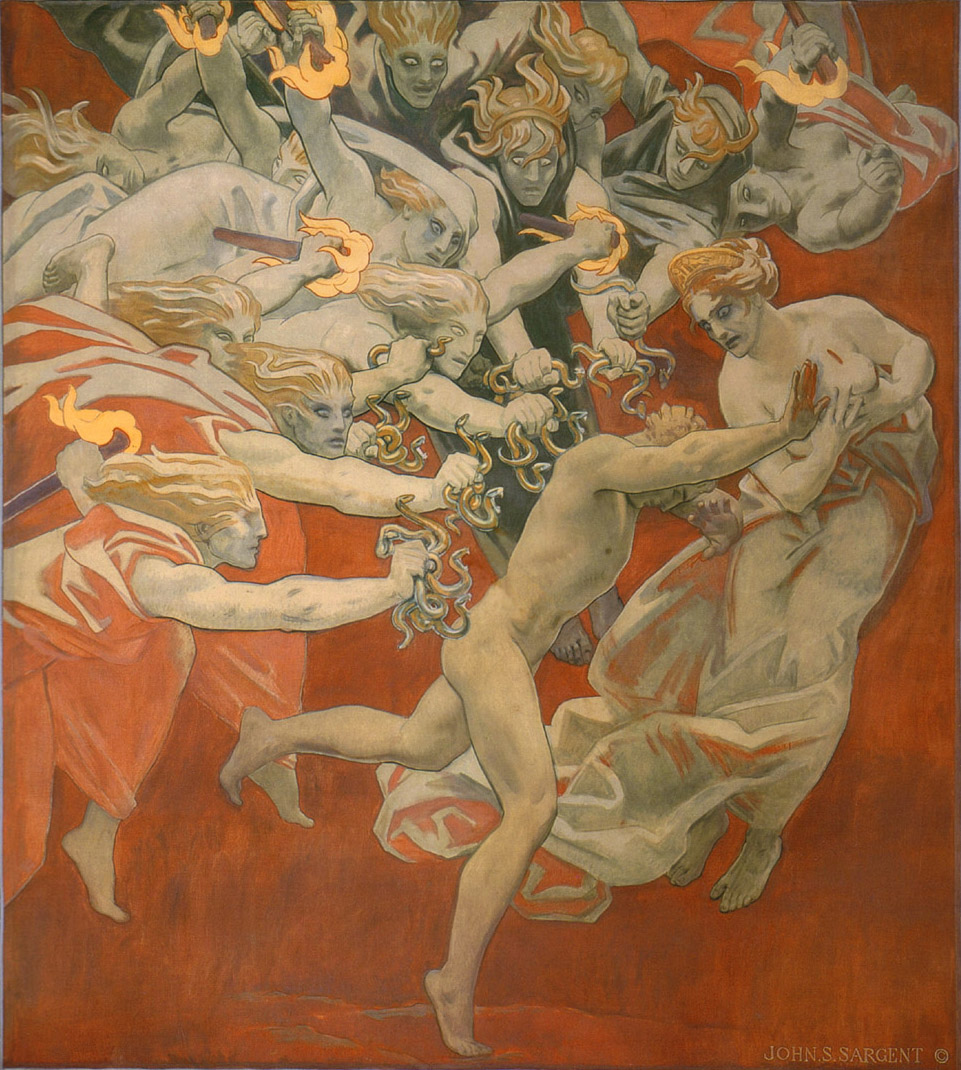
Orestes Pursued by the Furies, by John Singer Sargent. 1921. The erinyes represent the guilt for murdering his mother.

In criminal law, guilt is the state of being responsible for the commission of an offense. Legal guilt is entirely externally defined by the state, or more generally a "court of law". Being factually guilty of a criminal offense means that one has committed a violation of criminal law or performed all the elements of the offense set out by a criminal statute. The determination that one has committed that violation is made by an external body (a "court of law") after the determination of the facts by a finder of fact or "factfinder" (i.e., a jury) and is, therefore, as definitive as the record-keeping of the body. For instance, in the case of a bench trial, a judge acts as both the court of law and the factfinder, whereas in a jury trial, the jury is the trier of fact and the judge acts only as the trier of law.

== Factual guilt vs. legal guilt ==
In the United States, there exists factual guilt and legal guilt. Factual guilt relates to a person having factually committed a crime. This implies that the person fulfilled the requirements necessary for the offense to have occurred, such as the elements of the crime and their constitutive philosophical framework. However, it is not possible to prove that someone has factually committed a crime. Relative to this inability to conclusively prove factual guilt, the Münchhausen trilemma exemplifies that it is impossible to prove any truth. As it is impossible to prove factual guilt, a prosecutor must prove beyond a reasonable doubt that a defendant has committed a crime. As such, the prosecutor is required to prove the defendant's legal guilt.

The factfinder(s) in a criminal court case, through encountering evidence, determines whether there is sufficient evidence to substantiate a finding that the defendant committed the crime beyond a reasonable doubt. This may or may not be a reasonable finding, however. Thus, although a defendant may be found guilty beyond a reasonable doubt (thus, found legally guilty) of having committed a crime, such as to substantiate a conviction, such a finding does not necessarily imply that the defendant was factually found legally guilty. Related to this matter are convictions in criminal cases that are overturned by new evidence (such as in DNA exoneration cases), such that the finding of legal guilt is found by a different factfinder to have been unreasonable; thus, legal guilt is found to have not been factually found or substantiated: This new finding itself, however, is not necessarily factual either.

== Attribution of guilt as a social function ==
Philosophically, guilt in criminal law reflects a functioning society and its ability to condemn individuals' actions. It rests fundamentally on a presumption of free will, such as from a compatibilist perspective (as in the U.S.A.), in which individuals choose actions and are, therefore, subjected to the external judgement of the rightness or wrongness of those actions. As described by Judge Alvin B. Rubin in United States v. Lyons (1984):

An adjudication of guilt is more than a factual determination that the defendant pulled a trigger, took a bicycle, or sold heroin. It is a moral judgment that the individual is blameworthy. Our collective conscience does not allow punishment where it cannot impose blame. Our concept of blameworthiness rests on assumptions that are older than the Republic: man is naturally endowed with these two great faculties, understanding and liberty of will. Historically, our substantive criminal law is based on a theory of punishing the viscious [sic] will. It postulates a free agent confronted with a choice between doing right and wrong, and choosing freely to do wrong.

Legal scholars have raised concerns in recent years with the fast-paced media cycle and "rushed journalism" that mere allegations lead to accused, arrested, or indicted people of being prematurely identified in the press as being "guilty" long before that word is appropriate in the legal sense. This is, some argue, particularly true in the case of public figures where accusations may be newsworthy but also may vary in degree of credibility.

== Moral and legal definitions ==
"Guilt" is the obligation of a person who has violated a moral standard to bear the sanctions imposed by that moral standard. In legal terms, guilt means having been found to have violated a criminal law, though the law also raises 'the issue of defences, pleas, the mitigation of offences, and the defeasibility of claims'.

Les Parrott draws a three-fold distinction between "objective or legal guilt, which occurs when society's laws have been broken... social guilt...[over] an unwritten law of social expectation", and finally the way "personal guilt occurs when someone compromises one's own standards".

== Remedies ==
Guilt can sometimes be remedied by: punishment (a common action and advised or required in many legal and moral codes); forgiveness (as in transformative justice); making amends (see reparation or acts of reparation), or "restitution ... an important step in finding freedom from real guilt'; or by sincere remorse (as with confession in Catholicism or restorative justice). Guilt can also be remedied through intellectualisation or cognition (the understanding that the source of the guilty feelings was illogical or irrelevant). Helping other people can also help relieve guilt feelings: "Thus guilty people are often helpful people ... helping, like receiving an external reward, seemed to get people feeling better". There are also the so-called "Don Juans of achievement ... who pay the installments due their superego not by suffering but by achievements.... Since no achievement succeeds in really undoing the unconscious guilt, these persons are compelled to run from one achievement to another".

Law does not usually accept the agent's self-punishment, but some ancient codes did: in Athens, the accused could propose a remedy, which could be a reward, while the accuser proposed another, and the jury chose something in-between. This forced the accused to effectively bet on his support in the community, as Socrates did when he proposed "room and board in the town hall" as his fate. He lost and drank hemlock, a poison, as advised by his accuser.

== See also ==
- Consciousness of guilt
- Culpability
- Erinyes
- Malum in se
- Malum prohibitum
