= Cornell Law Review =

- Discipline: Law
- Language: English
- Edited by: Arin Sheehan, Editor-in-Chief

Publication details
- Former name: Cornell Law Quarterly
- History: 1915–present
- Publisher: Cornell Law School (United States)
- Frequency: Bimonthly

Standard abbreviations
- Bluebook: Cornell L. Rev.
- ISO 4: Cornell Law Rev.

Indexing
- ISSN: 0010-8847

Links
- Journal homepage

The Cornell Law Review is the flagship legal journal of Cornell Law School. Originally published in 1915 as the Cornell Law Quarterly, the journal features scholarship in all fields of law. Notably, past issues of the Cornell Law Review have included articles by Supreme Court justices Robert H. Jackson, John Marshall Harlan II, William O. Douglas, Felix Frankfurter, Ruth Bader Ginsburg, and Amy Coney Barrett.

== History ==
Cornell Law School first published a law review in June 1894—the first and only issue of the Cornell Law Journal—and again published a law review (the New York Law Review) from January to July 1895. Following these initial efforts, the Cornell Law Review began its continuous publication in 1915. Until 1966, the Cornell Law Review published four issues annually and was known as the Cornell Law Quarterly. Six Student Editors were joined by one Faculty Editor, a Business Manager, and an Assistant Business Manager. In the first issue of Cornell Law Quarterly in November 1915, Cornell professor (and soon-to-be dean) Edwin Hamlin Woodruff defended the launch of this new journal from critics who decried the proliferation of legal periodicals at the time (one contemporary critic counted 20 journals total, including non-scholarly periodicals).

Woodruff argued that the Cornell Law Quarterly would "justify its existence if it can reach and be helpful to...lawyers who might otherwise give their attention exclusively to the routine of practice" and noted the "pedagogical value...within the college itself" for the students who worked on the journal. Woodruff wrote that the journal "would not fail of its purpose, if it substantially enhances the spirit of mutual service between the College of Law and Cornell Lawyers; if it aides in some degree to foster any needed reform in the law, or to give help by intelligent discussion and investigation toward the solution of legal problems; and if it satisfies within the college itself among the students and faculty a desire to advance...the cause of legal education in a larger sense."

The first article in the first issue of the Cornell Law Quarterly was authored by Cornell University President Jacob Gould Schurman, who had recently completed his term as vice-president of the New York State Constitutional Convention of 1915. Schurman, and other authors in that issue and later issues of the Cornell Law Quarterly, chronicled the recent constitutional convention to illuminate the provisions of the state's new Constitution. The journal also realized Woodruff's vision by honing the legal skills of the student editors who served on the journal. One of the first Editors-in-Chief, Elbert Tuttle, later rose to prominence as the Chief Judge on the United States Court of Appeals for the Fifth Circuit during a time when that court was called upon to be the primary enforcer of the Supreme Court's decision in Brown v. Board of Education in the southern states in that circuit.

The journal grew steadily over the next fifty years, expanding to the point at which a staff of 34 students undertook a two-stage expansion of the journal's publishing schedule. In 1966, the Cornell Law Quarterly published six issues—Fall, Winter I, Winter II, Spring I, Spring II, and Summer. In 1967, it committed itself to a bi-monthly publishing schedule and changed its name to the Cornell Law Review. Today, the Review is edited exclusively by upper class students in Cornell Law School's Juris Doctor (J.D.) program.

In 2019, the Cornell Law Review became the first of the Top-14 schools to elect an all-female executive board.

The Cornell Law Review publishes seven issues annually.

== Alumni ==
Prominent alumni of the Cornell Law Review include:

- Edward J. Bloustein, 17th President of Rutgers University
- Arthur Hobson Dean, diplomat and corporate lawyer, Chairman of Cornell Board of Trustees
- Mary H. Donlon, first female editor-in-chief of Cornell Law Review, and of any US law review, and later Judge on the United States Customs Court
- Bob DuPuy, President and Chief Operating Officer of Major League Baseball
- William vanden Heuvel, former United States Permanent Representative to the United Nations and former Ambassador to the European Office of the United Nations in Geneva
- Robert Hillman, Edwin H. Woodruff Professor of Law at Cornell Law School
- Sol Linowitz, United States Ambassador to the Organization of American States, Chairman of Xerox
- William P. Rogers, 63rd United States Attorney General, 55th United States Secretary of State
- Faust Rossi, Samuel S. Leibowitz Professor of Trial Techniques at Cornell Law School
- Elbert Tuttle, former Chief Judge of the United States Court of Appeals for the Fifth Circuit
- Richard C. Wesley, Judge of the United States Court of Appeals for the Second Circuit
- Alison Nathan, Judge of the United States Court of Appeals for the Second Circuit
- John H. Chun, Judge of the United States District Court for the Western District of Washington
