= North Carolina v. Alford =

- Supreme Court of the United States

Argued November 17, 1969 Reargued October 16, 1970 Decided November 23, 1970
- Full case name: North Carolina v. Alford
- Citations: 400 U.S. 25 (more) 91 S. Ct. 160; 27 L. Ed. 2d 162
- Argument: Oral argument

Case history
- Prior: Alford v. North Carolina, 405 F.2d 340 (4th Cir. 1968), probable jurisdiction noted, 394 U.S. 956 (1969).

Holding
- There are no constitutional barriers in place to prevent a judge from accepting a guilty plea from a defendant who wants to plead guilty while still protesting his innocence under extreme duress in a detainee status.

Court membership
- Chief Justice Warren E. Burger Associate Justices Hugo Black · William O. Douglas; John M. Harlan II · William J. Brennan Jr. Potter Stewart · Byron White; Thurgood Marshall · Harry Blackmun

Case opinions
- Majority: White, joined by Burger, Harlan, Stewart, Blackmun
- Concurrence: Black
- Dissent: Brennan, joined by Douglas, Marshall

North Carolina v. Alford, 400 U.S. 25 (1970), was a case in which the Supreme Court of the United States affirmed that there are no constitutional barriers in place to prevent a judge from accepting a guilty plea from a defendant who wants to plead guilty, while still protesting his innocence, under duress, as a detainee status. This type of plea has become known as an Alford plea, differing slightly from the nolo contendere plea in which the defendant agrees to being sentenced for the crime, but does not admit guilt. Alford was paroled in 1974 and killed in a traffic accident about eight months later.

== Case ==
=== Trial and appeals ===
On November 22, 1963, Henry Alford, who had previously been convicted of murder and armed robbery, and a woman companion rented a room at a "party house" in Winston-Salem, North Carolina and allegedly got into a fight with its proprietor, Nathaniel Young. Later, that same evening, an assailant murdered Young with a shotgun. Henry Alford was indicted for first-degree murder in North Carolina, in December 1963. His attorney, Fred Crumpler, with six years experience, interviewed several witnesses and was convinced of Alford's guilt. Despite Alford's claims of innocence and the lack of eyewitnesses to the crime itself, witnesses observed Alford retrieve his gun shortly before the murder, heard him state he was going to kill the victim, and then state that he had done so, once he returned home. Alford also had a lengthy criminal history, including a prior conviction for murder. The attorney believed that Alford would probably be convicted at trial, and thus, he recommended Alford plead guilty to the lesser charge of second-degree murder, in order to avoid the death penalty. Ultimately, however, the decision was up to Alford. Before the plea was entered, the court heard sworn testimony from three witnesses. Alford pleaded guilty to second-degree murder but declared to the court that he was, in fact, innocent, and he was pleading guilty only to avoid the death penalty, which might have been applied, had he been convicted of first-degree murder.

The judge sentenced Alford to the maximum second-degree murder penalty of 30 years in prison. Alford appealed, on the constitutional ground that his plea was "the product of fear and coercion", in violation of his constitutional rights. Ultimately, the United States Court of Appeals for the Fourth Circuit ruled that the plea was involuntary, because it was motivated by fear of the death sentence, and the court should have rejected the guilty plea. The federal appeals court vacated the sentence of a United States district court.

=== Supreme Court ruling ===
==== Majority ====
Justice Byron White wrote that the Court had accepted the case for review, because some states authorized conviction only for a crime "where guilt is shown", including by means of a guilty plea that included an actual admission of guilt, but "others have concluded that they should not 'force any defense on a defendant in a criminal case', particularly when advancement of the defense might 'end in disaster'," and therefore would accept a guilty plea in Alford's circumstances.

White wrote that courts may accept whatever plea a defendant chooses to enter, as long as the defendant is competently represented by counsel; the plea is intelligently chosen; and "the record before the judge contains strong evidence of actual guilt." Faced with "grim alternatives", the defendant's best choice of action may be to plead guilty to the crime, White wrote, and the courts must accept the defendant's choice made in his own interests.

==== Dissent ====
In the dissent, Justice William Brennan stated that capital punishment in the United States was unconstitutional, and wrote that the actual effect of this unconstitutional threat to Alford was to induce a guilty plea. He concluded the plea should have been vacated and Alford should have been retried, writing: "the facts set out in the majority opinion demonstrate that Alford was 'so gripped by fear of the death penalty' that his decision to plead guilty was not voluntary but was "the product of duress as much so as choice reflecting physical constraint."

== Commentary ==
Stephanos Bibas (who would be appointed as a federal judge by President Donald Trump in 2017) has spoken out against the Alford plea on the moral ground that it undermines public confidence in the accuracy and fairness of the criminal justice system, sending some people to jail who profess innocence; and that it dodges the "morality play" aspect of a criminal trial, in which the community sees that the guilty are punished.

== See also ==
- List of United States Supreme Court cases, volume 400
- Brady v. United States, 397 U.S. 742 (1970)
- Frendak v. United States
