= Malum prohibitum =

Latin legal phrase meaning unlawful only by statute

Malum prohibitum (plural mala prohibita, literal translation: "wrong [as or because] prohibited") is a Latin phrase used in law to refer to conduct that constitutes an unlawful act only by virtue of statute, as opposed to conduct that is evil in and of itself, or malum in se.

Conduct that is so clearly violative of society's standards for allowable conduct that it is illegal under English common law is usually regarded as malum in se. An offense that is malum prohibitum may not appear on the face to directly violate moral standards. The distinction between these two cases is discussed in State of Washington v. Thaddius X. Anderson:

Criminal offenses can be broken down into two general categories malum in se and malum prohibitum. The distinction between malum in se and malum prohibitum offenses is best characterized as follows: a malum in se offense is "naturally evil as adjudged by the sense of a civilized community," whereas a malum prohibitum offense is wrong only because a statute makes it so. State v. Horton, 139 N.C. 588, 51 S.E. 945, 946 (1905).

"Public welfare offenses" are a subset of malum prohibitum offenses as they are typically regulatory in nature and often "'result in no direct or immediate injury to person or property but merely create the danger or probability of it which the law seeks to minimize.'" Bash, 130 Wn.2d at 607 (quoting Morissette v. United States, 342 U.S. 246, 255–56, 72 S. Ct. 240, 96 L. Ed. 288 (1952)); see also State v. Carty, 27 Wn. App. 715, 717, 620 P.2d 137 (1980).

Examples of offenses that are generally regarded as mala prohibita include disorderly conduct, gambling, possession of a controlled substance, prostitution, public intoxication, resisting arrest, speeding, and vagrancy.

== See also ==
- Process crime
- Public-order crime
- Victimless crime
