= Malum in se =

Latin legal phrase meaning inherently wrong/evil

Malum in se (plural mala in se) is a Latin phrase meaning "wrong" or "evil in itself". The phrase is used to refer to conduct assessed as sinful, contradictory to natural law or inherently wrong by nature, independent of regulations governing the conduct. It is distinguished from malum prohibitum, which refers to acts that are wrong only because they are prohibited by law.

For example, most human beings believe that arson, murder, rape, and theft are wrong, regardless of whether a law governs such conduct or where the conduct occurs, and is thus recognizably malum in se. In contrast, malum prohibitum crimes are criminal not because they are inherently bad, but because the act is prohibited by the law of the state. For example, most United States jurisdictions require drivers to drive on the right side of the road. This is not because driving on the left side of a road is considered immoral, but because consistent rules promote safety and order on the roads.

The question between inherently wrong versus prohibited most likely originated in Plato's Socratic dialogue, Euthyphro, in which Socrates famously asked "Is the pious (τὸ ὅσιον) loved by the gods because it is pious, or is it pious because it is loved by the gods?" (10a). Is it good because the gods will it or do the gods will it because it is good?

This concept was used to develop the various common law offences. In the Case of Proclamations, it was determined that "that which is against common law is malum in se, malum prohibitum is such an offence as is prohibited by Act of Parliament".

Another way to describe the underlying conceptual difference between "malum in se" and "malum prohibitum" is "iussum quia iustum" and "iustum quia iussum", namely something that is commanded (iussum) because it is just (iustum) and something that is just (iustum) because it is commanded (iussum).

== See also ==
- Just war theory
- Euthyphro dilemma
- Moral turpitude
