= Deferred adjudication =

Form of plea deal

A deferred adjudication, also known in some jurisdictions as an adjournment in contemplation of dismissal (ACOD), probation before judgment (PBJ), or deferred entry of judgment (DEJ), is a form of plea deal available in various jurisdictions, where a defendant pleads "guilty" or "no contest" to criminal charges in exchange for meeting certain requirements laid out by the court within an allotted period of time also ordered by the court. Upon completion of the requirements, which may include probation, treatment, community service, some form of community supervision, or some other diversion program, the defendant may avoid a formal conviction on their record or have their case dismissed. In some cases, an order of non-disclosure can be obtained, and sometimes a record can be expunged.

== Procedure ==
In a deferred adjudication, the criminal case that resulted in the deferred adjudication will often remain part of a permanent record. The extent to which the record of a deferral can be discovered or disclosed varies by jurisdiction. For example, even if not available to the general public, the record may remain visible to law enforcement and for some government background checks, such as enlistment in the military or employment with a government agency. Some jurisdictions allow for the record to be rendered inaccessible to the public or private-sector background checks.

Anyone offered deferred adjudication in exchange for a guilty plea should first consult their attorney regarding the exact consequences of doing so.

== Criminal records after deferred adjudication ==
In some jurisdictions, defendants who have completed a deferred adjudication for a criminal charge may not be eligible for expungement of their criminal record, such that even though the charge was dismissed there remains a public record of their criminal prosecution. As no conviction was finalized, it may not be possible to remove this criminal record as might have been possible as a result of a pardon or clemency following a criminal conviction. For example, in the U.S. State of Texas, a defendant may obtain an expungement following a deferred disposition for a Class C misdemeanor, but for any other deferred dispositions a defendant must obtain a pardon before the record may be expunged, although some defendants may be able to have their records sealed following a waiting period.

== United States ==
=== Maryland ===
In Maryland, deferred adjudication is called probation before judgment (PBJ). The conditions of this principle are set down in Title §6–220 of the state's Criminal Procedure article. This law enables a judge to defer entering a judgment (that is, delay the entry of a "guilty" verdict) if the defendant pleads guilty or nolo contendere in writing, so long as certain conditions are met. Because the judgment is not entered as "guilty," a PBJ does not legally count as a conviction for a crime, and therefore the defendant is spared some hardships of having a criminal record, e.g. for purposes of job applications he or she does not have to disclose it as a conviction, though a full criminal background check will still reveal the case.

The defendant, however, is still placed on probation and can be compelled to pay a monetary fine or other restitution, enroll in a drug rehabilitation program, work community service hours, and/or less frequently, sentenced to imprisonment or alternative confinement. If the defendant carries out their sentence and behaves within the conditions of their probation (i.e. commits no further crimes), they become eligible for expungement three years after the judgment or when their probation ends, whichever is later (in some cases they can file early if they can show "good cause" to a judge). Expungement is not automatically requested; the defendant is responsible for filing for it at court once their time is up.

The statute in Maryland regarding expungement (Md. Ann. Code, Crim. Proc. Art. 10-105(a)(3)) expressly excludes drunk driving charges (Md. Ann. Code, Transportation Article 21-902) where a PBJ is received. DUI charges cannot be expunged.

=== Maine ===
In Maine there are two types of deferred adjudications available to a defendant (filing agreement and deferred disposition), but only if there is an agreement between the prosecutor and the defendant or defense counsel to resolve the criminal charges through deferred adjudication.

The first type of deferred adjudication is what is known as a filing agreement. Although there is no statutory authority in the Maine Revised Statues for a filing agreement, the basis and requirements for this type of disposition is found in Maine Rule of Criminal Procedure 11B, which reads as follows:

Rule 11B. Filing Agreements

(a) In General. The attorney for the state and the defendant may enter into a written filing agreement respecting a pending indictment, information or complaint. The filing agreement must establish a definite filing period of up to one year subject to the conditions, if any, set forth in the filing agreement. Upon execution of the agreement by the parties, the state shall file the agreement forthwith in the trial court and, upon such filing, the agreement will become effective.

(b) Court Approval Unnecessary. The approval of the court for the filing of a written filing agreement by the parties is unnecessary; however, a filing agreement is subject to the control of the court. If the agreement calls for the payment by the defendant of costs of prosecution such agreed-upon costs may be in any amount up to, but not exceeding, the maximum authorized fine amount for the particular crime based upon its sentencing class and need not reflect the actual costs of prosecution.

(c) Disposition During or at Expiration of Filing Period. Except where a filing agreement expressly provides otherwise as specified in subdivision (d), if the defendant has satisfied each of the filing agreement's conditions, if any, at the conclusion of the agreed upon filing period the defendant is entitled to have the filed indictment, information or complaint dismissed with prejudice. In this regard, unless the attorney for the state files a motion alleging a violation of one or more of the agreement's conditions by the defendant and seeking to have the criminal proceeding in which the indictment, information or complaint was filed reactivated by the court, at the expiration of the filing period the clerk shall enter a dismissal of the filed charging instrument with prejudice. In the event the attorney for the state files a motion during or at the end of the filing period alleging a violation of one or more of the agreement's conditions, the attorney for the state is entitled to have the criminal proceeding reactivated by the court if, following a hearing on the motion, the court finds by a preponderance of the evidence that the defendant has violated one or more of the agreement's conditions.

(d) Special Reservations in the Filing Agreement. If the attorney for the state wishes to preserve the right to reinitiate a criminal proceeding after the filing period has fully run when no breach of conditions has occurred, or to preserve the right to initiate the same or additional criminal charges against the defendant arising out of the same event or conduct in a separate criminal proceeding while the filing period is running, the attorney for the state must expressly reserve such a right in the written filing agreement and the defendant must expressly agree to it.

As a practical matter, from the standpoint of a defendant in a criminal matter, a filing agreement is a very favorable means to resolve the case in that it does not require the defendant to enter a guilty plea or admit to conduct. Furthermore, the conditions on a filing agreement are typically less onerous on a defendant and in the event that the Defendant fails to abide by the conditions of the filing agreement, the State has to move the Court to restore the case back to the docket, which, if granted, affords the Defendant an opportunity to again fight the charges.

The second type of deferred adjudication in Maine is what is known as a deferred disposition. Unlike a filing agreement, there is statutory authority under 17-A M.R.S.A. § 1348 et. seq. for a deferred disposition. Furthermore, unlike a filing agreement, a deferred disposition requires the defendant to enter a plea of guilty in the matter before having the sentence deferred while the deferred disposition agreement is in effect. In Maine, a deferred disposition is only available for defendants charged with either a class E or D misdemeanor, or a class C felony. A deferred disposition is not available for juvenile matters or for class A or B felonies.

In general, the requirements of deferred dispositions are controlled by 17-A M.R.S.A. § 1348-A, which reads as follows:

Deferred disposition

1. Following the acceptance of a plea of guilty for a crime for which a person is eligible for a deferred disposition under section 1348, the court may order sentencing deferred to a date certain or determinable and impose requirements upon the person, to be in effect during the period of deferment, considered by the court to be reasonable and appropriate to assist the person to lead a law-abiding life. The court-imposed deferment requirements must include a requirement that the person refrain from criminal conduct and may include a requirement that the person pay to the appropriate county an administrative supervision fee of not more than $50 per month, as determined by the court, for the term of the deferment. In determining the amount of the fee, the court shall take into account the financial resources of the person and the nature of the burden its payment imposes. In exchange for the deferred sentencing, the person shall abide by the court-imposed deferment requirements. Unless the court orders otherwise, the requirements are immediately in effect.

2. During the period of deferment and upon application of the person granted deferred disposition pursuant to subsection 1 or of the attorney for the State or upon the court's own motion, the court may, after a hearing upon notice to the attorney for the State and the person, modify the requirements imposed by the court, add further requirements or relieve the person of any requirement imposed by the court that, in the court's opinion, imposes an unreasonable burden on the person.

3. During the period of deferment, if the person cannot meet a deferment requirement imposed by the court, the person shall bring a motion pursuant to subsection 2.

4. For purposes of a deferred disposition, a person is deemed to have been convicted when the court imposes the sentence.

The resolution of a deferred disposition is controlled by 17-A M.R.S.A. § 1348-B, which requires that the Court hold a sentencing hearing wherein the defendant has the burden by showing as a preponderance of the evidence that they have complied with the terms of the deferred disposition agreement. If the defendant can make such a showing then the Court will follow whichever resolution is contained in the agreement, which is usually to allow the defendant to withdraw their plea and dismiss the matter. However a dismissal is not guaranteed as the agreement may call for the State to introduce a new lesser charge to which the defendant will enter a plea to and be sentenced as per the terms of the deferred disposition agreement. If the defendant cannot show by a preponderance of the evidence that they have complied with the deferred disposition agreement, then the Court will proceed to sentence the defendant on the original charge as per the terms of the agreement. If during the course of the agreement, the prosecutor has probable cause to believe that the defendant is not complying with the deferred disposition agreement or has committed new criminal conduct, the prosecutor may then move the Court to terminate the deferred disposition and impose sentence on the original charge. The Court will set a hearing on this motion, where the prosecutor must show by a preponderance of the evidence that the defendant failed to comply.

Again as a practical matter from the standpoint of the defendant, a deferred disposition in Maine should be entered into cautiously as the Court as a defendant is required to enter a plea of guilty in order to put the agreement in effect. The consequence of this is that if the defendant fails to comply with the agreement, they are not afforded the opportunity to fight the charge as with a filing agreement because a plea has already been entered. Rather, if the Court finds that the defendant failed to meet the terms of the deferred disposition, the Court will impose sentence on the original charge and the conviction will stand.

=== Texas ===
In the State of Texas, deferred adjudication is not treated as a criminal conviction as a matter of law; however, there is no easy way to remove the record of the case from one's background. This creates difficulties with private entities performing background checks such as employers and apartment complexes, as they can see the case, charge and its outcome, and often simply treat it the same as though it were a conviction for purposes of their review. Also, those who fill out an application for a Texas Concealed Handgun License (or any other state license with the exception of a Texas Driver License or state issued ID card) the Deferred Adjudication charge must be disclosed (for CHL applications if the Deferred Adjudication is over 5 years old the individual is eligible to apply but has to disclose their criminal past). To date the State of Texas has passed into law the Order of Nondisclosure where criminal justice agencies (law enforcement, community supervision e.g. probation) are prohibited from disclosing to the public criminal history record information related to the offense for which defendant successfully completed deferred adjudication community supervision. There are limitations where some criminal offenses (from sex offenses, family violence, dating violence) do not allow an Order of Nondisclosure to be filed - felony offenses (in the State of Texas) have a 5-year waiting period, some misdemeanors 2 years, and misdemeanors not listed under the 2-year waiting period can be filed immediately.

== Federal consequences ==
=== Immigration ===
Under U.S. immigration law (pre or post-9/11 which also includes the worded language of the USA Patriot Act) if the defendant is an illegal immigrant charged for a criminal offense, deferred adjudication is considered a conviction where once the sentence is discharged (completed) ICE (Immigration and Customs Enforcement) can have the individual deported from the United States to the country of origin. The same holds true for permanent residents of the United States (resident alien) if moral turpitude is invoked.

=== Military ===
It used to be practice for a judge to give a pending convict the option of joining the military, or serving prison time (R. Lee Ermey being one prominent example of this). However, the U.S. Army, Marine Corps, Air Force, and Coast Guard have since explicitly forbidden entrance in to armed forces as an alternative for judicial punishment, and the U.S. Navy strongly discourages it. The U.S. Armed Forces have required moral waivers for those convicted of crimes to be inducted since the 1960s. Under present regulation, joining the military as an alternative to serving time in jail is no longer permitted by any branch of the armed services. For example, in 2006 a New York judge gave a man the option of enlistment in lieu of spending up to a year in jail for aggravated assault. The Army however, rejected his entrance under those terms, having officially banned the option in 1984.

== See also ==
- Adjournment in contemplation of dismissal
