= Red Rock Brewery =

Brewery based in the U.S. state of Utah

Coordinates: 40.76363°N 111.89727°W

- Logo

- Red Rock Brewpub's location in downtown Salt Lake City
- Founded: 1994 in Salt Lake City, U.S.
- Founder: Bob Jensen
- Headquarters: Salt Lake City, U.S.
- Products: craft beer
- Website: redrockbrewing.com

Red Rock Brewery, or Red Rock Brewing Co., is a brewery founded in 1994 and based in Salt Lake City, Utah, United States.

== Overview ==
The flagship brewery is located in Salt Lake’s Marmalade District, between 200 South and 300 South, with additional Utah locations in the Fashion Place Mall in Murray and Kimball Junction near Park City. Red Rock serves food, such as burgers and pizzas, in addition to beer.

In 2019, Red Rock founder Bob Jensen spoke in front of the Utah House committee at a March 6 legislative hearing concerning a proposal that beer with an alcohol limit of 4.8 percent (up from 3.2 percent) be sold in grocery and convenience stores. Jensen claimed the higher alcohol percentage would make it "very easy" for buyers, both adult and underage, to "overconsume." As a result, at least a dozen Utah bars refused to sell products made by Red Rock Brewing Co, as the bar owners felt Jensen had said what he believe "the committee wanted to hear." Jensen was quoted as saying he wanted to develop better legislation concerning beer "with all of the stakeholders at the table."
