= Rhonda Stapley =

American author (born 1955)

- Born: Rhonda Stapley; 1955 (age 70–71); Salt Lake City, Utah, U. S.
- Other name: Rhonda Goddings
- Education: University of Utah
- Occupations: Author; Pharmacist; Motivational speaker; Advocator; Human rights activist
- Years active: 2016 – present
- Children: 2

Rhonda Stapley (born 1955) is an American author, retired pharmacist, and public speaker recognized for surviving a 1974 attack by serial killer Ted Bundy. After maintaining silence for nearly 42 years, she published her memoir in 2016, detailing the assault and her lifelong battle with post-traumatic stress disorder (PTSD).

== Early life and education ==
Stapley grew up in the Latter-day Saint (LDS) faith. In 1974, she was a 21-year-old pharmacy student at the University of Utah. On the day of her encounter, she had just finished a dental appointment and was waiting for a bus in downtown Salt Lake City near Liberty Park.

== The 1974 encounter ==
On October 11, 1974, a man in a tan Volkswagen Beetle offered her a ride. He introduced himself as "Ted," a first-year law student, and appeared non-threatening. Stapley noted the passenger door handle was missing but assumed it was just an old car. Bundy claimed he had a quick errand "near the zoo," but drove past Hogle Zoo into a secluded area of Emigration Canyon. After parking in an isolated grove, Bundy leaned in as if to kiss her, then whispered, "I'm going to kill you". He strangled her into unconsciousness and spent hours raping and torturing her, repeatedly reviving her only to choke her again.

When Bundy turned away to retrieve something (likely a weapon) from his car, Stapley fled. Despite her clothing being entangled, she fell into a mountain stream that swept her away. She eventually hiked 10 to 12 miles back to campus in wet, freezing clothes.

=== The aftermath and "second silence" ===
Stapley kept the attack a secret for 42 years. Her silence was driven by cultural stigma as a young LDS woman, she feared being judged by her community for losing her "virtue". Stapley did not report the attack at the time, citing feelings of deep shame, fear of being ostracized by her religious community, and a desire to avoid being defined as a "rape victim". A year later, she recognized Bundy on the news following his arrest for the Carol DaRonch kidnapping. She suffered intense guilt, believing that reporting him earlier might have saved subsequent victims.

She attempted to "push it down" to live a normal life, becoming a professional pharmacist and raising two children.

== Career ==
Stapley graduated from the University of Utah with a Bachelor of Science in Pharmacy in 1976. She worked as a professional pharmacist for decades and is also credited as an inventor.

=== Breakdown and recovery ===
In 2011, a workplace bullying incident involving a yelling supervisor served as a PTSD trigger. The encounter echoed Bundy's voice, leading to a breakdown characterized by insomnia, night terrors, and flashbacks. Seeking help, she found an online pen pal—another woman who had a brush with Bundy—who encouraged her to seek therapy and write her story.

== Personal life ==
Stapley is married and has two daughters and has several grandchildren. She lives in the Salt Lake City area with her family and advocates for victims of sexual assault and trauma.

== Publications and media ==
In 2016, she published her memoir, I Survived Ted Bundy: The Attack, Escape & PTSD That Changed My Life. The book features a foreword by Ann Rule, who verified that Stapley's account aligned perfectly with the known FBI timeline of Bundy's movements in 1974.

She has shared her story on ABC's 20/20, Dr. Phil, and the Reelz docuseries Ted Bundy: The Survivors.

== In popular culture ==
- She was portrayed by actress Tiffany Shepis in the 2002 film Ted Bundy.

== See also ==
- Ted Bundy
