= Karen Sparks Epley =

American accountant (born 1955)

- Born: Karen Sparks; 1955 (age 70–71); Seattle, Washington, U. S.
- Other names: Joni Lenz; Mary Adams; Terri Caldwell
- Education: University of Washington
- Occupations: Accountant; Advocator; Human rights activist
- Years active: 2013–present
- Children: 3

Karen Sparks Epley (born 1955) is an American accountant and advocator. She is a survivor who is widely recognized as the first known victim of serial killer Ted Bundy. For decades, she remained anonymous in true crime literature, often referred to by the pseudonym "Joni Lenz", "Mary Adams" and "Terri Caldwell". She broke her silence in 2020 to share her story in the Amazon Prime docuseries Ted Bundy: Falling for a Killer.

== Early life and education ==
In 1974, Sparks was an 18-year-old student at the University of Washington in Seattle. She was a dancer and lived in a basement apartment in the city's University District.

== 1974 attack ==
On the night of January 4, 1974 someone entered Sparks' apartment while she was asleep and attacked her. Sparks has no memory of the attack, and Ted Bundy was identified as her attacker only retrospectively. He lived nearby, and the crime against Sparks was similar to a fatal attack on college student Lynda Ann Healy which happened in the same area of Seattle on late January 31, 1974 or early February 1, and was later linked to Bundy. No charges were ever filed against Bundy for the attack on Sparks, but police believe he is the culprit.

In the attack on Sparks, Bundy used a metal rod (reportedly a piece of her own bedframe) bludgeon her, causing a massive skull fracture. He then used the same rod to sexually assault her, causing severe internal injuries and a ruptured bladder.

Sparks lay in a pool of blood for approximately 18 to 20 hours before being found by her roommate. She remained in a coma for 10 days.

Sparks believes she survived and was not taken from her apartment like Healy because her male roommate Chuck talked in his sleep and may have spooked Bundy into fleeing.

The attack left Sparks with permanent physical and neurological disabilities. She had permanent brain damage and a period of epileptic fits. She has sensory problems, with a 50% loss of hearing, a 40% loss of vision, and constant tinnitus (ringing in the ears).

Karen's father played a critical role in her recovery, refusing medical advice to place her in a nursing home and instead helping her relearn to walk and speak.

== Later life and career ==
She deliberately chose to live a private life to avoid being defined by the attack. She became a successful accountant.

After 46 years of anonymity, Sparks appeared in the 2020 Amazon Prime documentary Ted Bundy: Falling for a Killer. Her appearance debunked long-standing media rumors that she had been permanently institutionalized due to brain damage. In 2021, she participated in a roundtable discussion with other survivors for the Fox Nation special Surviving Bundy with Nancy Grace.

== Personal life ==
She is married and has children. She kept her history as a survivor secret from her children for most of their lives, stating, "I never directly talked to my own children about it because, you know, I am mom".

== Advocacy ==
She is active in her mission to ensure victims are remembered for their lives rather than just their trauma. She frequently participates in documentaries and continues to advocate for survivor narratives.

== General and cited sources ==
- Michaud, Stephen; Aynesworth, Hugh (1983). The Only Living Witness: The True Story of Serial Sex Killer Ted Bundy. New York City: Linden Press / Simon & Schuster. ISBN 978-0-671449-61-2.
- Michaud, Stephen; Aynesworth, Hugh (August 1999) [1983]. The Only Living Witness: The True Story of Serial Sex Killer Ted Bundy (Paperback; revised ed.). Irving, Texas: Authorlink Press. ISBN 978-1-928704-11-9. Archived from the original on May 23, 2024.
- Keppel, Robert (2005). The Riverman: Ted Bundy and I Hunt for the Green River Killer (Paperback ed.). New York City: Pocket Books. ISBN 978-0-7434-6395-9.
- Rule, Ann (1980). The Stranger Beside Me (First ed.). New York and London: W. W. Norton & Company. ISBN 0-393-01399-5.
- Rule, Ann (1989). The Stranger Beside Me (Paperback; revised and updated ed.). New York City: Signet Books. ISBN 978-0-451-16493-3.
- Rule, Ann (2000). The Stranger Beside Me (Paperback; updated 20th anniversary ed.). New York: Signet Books. ISBN 978-0-451-20326-7.
- Rule, Ann (2009). The Stranger Beside Me (Paperback; updated 2009 ed.). New York City: Pocket Books. ISBN 978-1-4165-5959-7.
- Sullivan, Kevin M. (2009). The Bundy Murders: A Comprehensive History (Paperback ed.). Jefferson, North Carolina: McFarland and Co. ISBN 978-0-7864-4426-7.
- Sullivan, Kevin (2020). The Enigma of Ted Bundy: The Questions and Controversies Surrounding America's Most Infamous Serial Killer (ebook ed.). Denver, Colorado: WildBlue Press. ISBN 978-1-952225-37-6. Archived from the original on March 27, 2024.
