= Murder of Rita Curran =

1971 murder in Vermont, United States

- Rita Curran
- Location: Burlington, Vermont, U.S.
- Date: July 20, 1971; 55 years ago
- Victims: Rita Curran, aged 24
- Perpetrator: William DeRoos

The murder of Rita Curran occurred in Burlington, Vermont, United States, in 1971 and was solved after more than fifty years through the use of DNA technology.

Curran was a second-grade school teacher, and she worked during the summer months as a maid at a local motel. In the summer of 1971, Curran had moved out of her parents' home for the first time to live in a Burlington, Vermont apartment, on Brookes Avenue, with three other roommates. On July 20, 1971, a returning roommate found Curran's dead body in the apartment. Curran had been beaten, sexually assaulted, and asphyxiated.

In 2014, the Burlington police department sent for DNA analysis all the evidence collected in the crime scene, including a cigarette butt. While the tests did compile a DNA profile of the person who had smoked the cigarette, it did not match any DNA in databases compiled by law enforcement agencies across the country, possibly because the person did not have a felony conviction. In 2019, a new team of detectives sent the cigarette butt for DNA analysis using "genetic genealogy," the process that combines genealogical DNA tests with traditional genealogical methods to infer genetic relationships between individuals. The cigarette DNA had strong connections to relatives of William DeRoos, one of Curran's neighbors. DeRoos lived in an apartment two floors above Curran's at the time of the murder. The DNA left on Curran's ripped housecoat also matched the DNA on the cigarette butt. DeRoos was identified as the killer, but he had already died at the time of the identification. DeRoos died in 1986 due to a drug overdose while staying at a San Francisco hotel.

== Murder ==
In the summer of 1971, 24-year old Rita Curran had just moved out of her parents' home for the first time to live in a Burlington, Vermont apartment, on Brookes Avenue, with three other roommates, whom she did not know well. Curran was a second-grade school teacher. She had started graduate courses at the University of Vermont, while also working during the summer months as a maid at a local motel.

In the early morning hours of July 20, 1971, a roommate arrived in the apartment and found Curran's dead body. Burlington policemen arrived and determined that the victim had been beaten, sexually assaulted, and asphyxiated. They also found evidence that Curran had fiercely resisted her attacker, putting up a "vicious struggle."

Former Senator Patrick Leahy, who was State's Attorney of Chittenden County at the time of the murder, said he had seen many gruesome crimes during his time as prosecutor, but Rita Curran's family stayed in his thoughts for years after their daughter's murder.

== Investigation ==
Police officers collected evidence from the crime scene that included a single cigarette butt found near her arm. They interviewed the apartment's neighbors and investigated "hundreds of tips." Among the people questioned were a couple that lived in an apartment two floors above Curran's at the time of the murder. The husband, William DeRoos, who had a criminal record, stated that he was in the apartment with his wife all night and they had not heard or seen anything, a statement confirmed by his wife, Michelle DeRoos. Eventually, the police were unable to identify a suspect.

=== Ted Bundy as suspect ===
The location of the motel where Curran worked was adjacent to serial killer Ted Bundy's birthplace, the Elizabeth Lund Home for Unwed Mothers. Similarities to known Bundy crime scenes led retired FBI agent John Bassett to propose him as a suspect. Curran's sister wrote to Bundy while he was being held on Florida's death row to inquire whether he was responsible for Curran's death. In response, the FBI informed her that Bundy had declined to confirm or deny his culpability. No evidence firmly placed Bundy in Burlington on that date, although municipal records note that a person named "Bundy" was bitten by a dog that week.

Detective Robert D. Keppel questioned Bundy, who said he murdered a young woman in Burlington when he was there in 1971 to obtain "information about his birth." On January 22, 1989, the eve of his execution, Bundy denied to FBI Special Agent William Hagmaier any involvement in the Curran case.

== Family grieving ==
As subsequently related by Curran's brother, Tom, he and his parents did not have "social workers and specialized grievance counselors." They had the confessional and the rosary beads, he said, adding, "We were an old-fashioned, strong, Catholic family."

== Identification of murderer ==
A major factor that enabled the case's eventual resolution was the "careful collection and preservation" by the various policemen involved in the case of items found in the crime scene.

In 2014, the Burlington police department sent for DNA analysis all the evidence collected in the crime scene, including the cigarette butt. According to Burlington's acting police chief, Jon Murad, the department "never stopped seeking" justice for the victim's family. While the tests did compile a DNA profile of the person who had smoked the cigarette, it did not match any DNA in databases compiled by law enforcement agencies across the country, possibly because the person did not have a felony conviction.

In 2019, a new team of detectives picked up the case. Detective Lt. James Trieb, instead of having a single detective work the case alone, per the department's usual strategy, decided the police would treat the crime "as if it had just been committed," and brought in a team of detectives and expert technicians to review and discuss it. The team began re-testing evidence, and sent the cigarette butt for DNA analysis using "genetic genealogy," the process that combines genealogical DNA tests with traditional genealogical methods to infer genetic relationships between individuals.

An outside genetic genealogy expert then concluded that the cigarette DNA had strong connections to relatives of William DeRoos (the person living near the victim's apartment who had been questioned by detectives and claimed an alibi) on both his paternal and maternal sides. Investigators found a living half-brother of DeRoos who willingly provided a DNA sample, and his sample bolstered the conclusion that the cigarette DNA belonged to DeRoos. Finally, the DNA left on Curran's ripped house-coat also matched the DNA on the cigarette butt.

As the police found out, DeRoos and his wife had left Vermont soon after the murder and separated; at some point in time, DeRoos moved to Thailand where he became a Buddhist monk. Interviewed once again by the police, DeRoos' ex-wife, who had moved to Eugene, Oregon, and changed her name, told investigators she had lied about her husband being with her all night in their apartment. Detective Thomas Chennette, who interviewed her, said he did not believe she knew her husband had killed Curran, but was protecting him because they were newly married and obviously in love and he had a criminal record. It was established that DeRoos, a cigarette smoker, had gotten into an argument with his wife on the evening of July 20 and gone out for a walk "to cool off." The next day, he told his wife of two weeks to tell police investigating Curran's death that he had never left their apartment, warning her that his past criminal record would "unfairly" make him a suspect in her death.

Burlington detectives also interviewed a San Francisco woman who had married DeRoos in 1974. She told them he had a "penchant" for "sudden outbursts of violence." There were at least two instances where he was violent around her, she said, one being when the couple was talking with a female friend and he took out a pocket knife, stabbing the woman in her abdomen “for no reason whatsoever.” He was arrested but the woman did not press charges. At another time, she said, the two of them were having dinner when he suddenly started to strangle her without any apparent reason, at which point she left him.

DeRoos died in 1986 at age 46 as the result of a drug overdose while staying at a San Francisco hotel.
