= Carol DaRonch =

American advocator (born 1956)

- Born: Carol Ann DaRonch; June 8, 1956 (age 70); Salt Lake City, Utah, U. S.
- Occupation: Telephone operator
- Years active: 1974 – present
- Spouse: Michael
- Children: 1

Carol Ann DaRonch (born June 8, 1956) is known for surviving an abduction attempt by serial killer Ted Bundy. Her escape on November 8, 1974 provided law enforcement with their first significant physical evidence and led to Bundy's first criminal conviction in 1976.

== Early life and education ==
DaRonch was born in Salt Lake City, Utah. Her father was of Italian descent, while her mother had English ancestry. In 1974, she was an 18-year-old high school graduate working as a telephone operator. She has described herself during this period as "extremely shy" and helpful, traits she believes Bundy targeted for exploitation.

She attended night school at The University of Utah to earn a degree in business management.

== Abduction ==
Around 7:00 PM on November 8, 1974, DaRonch was window-shopping at the Fashion Place Mall in Murray, Utah. Bundy approached her posing as "Officer Roseland," claiming someone had attempted to break into her 1974 maroon Camaro. After verifying her car appeared untouched, Bundy convinced her to accompany him to a substation behind a nearby laundromat to sign a complaint. When they found the door locked, he claimed they must go to the main police station and led her to his 1968 Volkswagen Beetle.

Bundy drove to a nearby elementary school, pulled over, and grabbed DaRonch's arm. He successfully locked one handcuff on her left wrist, but she fought back as he threatened her with a handgun and a crowbar. DaRonch managed to tumble out of the vehicle and flag down a passing car driven by Wilbur and Mary Walsh, who rescued her while the handcuff still dangled from her wrist.

=== Legal impact and conviction ===
In October 1975, following Bundy's arrest for a traffic violation, DaRonch identified him in a police lineup. In February 1976, she was the key witness in Bundy's trial for aggravated kidnapping. Despite intense cross-examination by defense attorney John O'Connell regarding her initial description of the vehicle and badge, she firmly maintained her identification, famously stating she would "never forget his face". Bundy was found guilty and sentenced to 1 to 15 years in prison.

DaRonch traveled to Aspen, Colorado, to testify against Bundy at his trial for the murder of Caryn Campbell, where she was directly cross-examined by Bundy while he acted as his own attorney. She also testified at his 1979 pre-sentencing hearing in Miami.

=== Later life ===
Following the trials, DaRonch intentionally sought a life of privacy, though her case remains a cornerstone of Bundy's criminal history.

== Personal life ==
As of 2022, she lives in Utah with her partner Michael and their son.

== Legacy ==
DaRonch appeared in the 2019 Netflix docuseries Conversations with a Killer: The Ted Bundy Tapes.

== In popular culture ==
- She was portrayed by actress Emily Longstreth in the 1986 television series The Deliberate Stranger.
- She was portrayed by actress Tiffany Shepis in the 2002 film Ted Bundy.
- She was portrayed by actress Christina Wolfe in the 2016 film Angel of Decay.
- She appeared as herself in the 2019 Netflix docuseries Conversations with a Killer: The Ted Bundy Tapes and the 2020 Amazon series Ted Bundy: Falling for a Killer.
- She was portrayed by actress Grace Victoria Cox in the 2019 film Extremely Wicked, Shockingly Evil and Vile.
- She was portrayed by actress Olivia DeLaurentis in the 2021 film Ted Bundy: American Boogeyman.

== See also ==
- Ted Bundy

== General and cited sources ==
- Michaud, Stephen; Aynesworth, Hugh (1983). The Only Living Witness: The True Story of Serial Sex Killer Ted Bundy. New York City: Linden Press / Simon & Schuster. ISBN 978-0-671449-61-2.
- Michaud, Stephen; Aynesworth, Hugh (August 1999) [1983]. The Only Living Witness: The True Story of Serial Sex Killer Ted Bundy (Paperback; revised ed.). Irving, Texas: Authorlink Press. ISBN 978-1-928704-11-9. Archived from the original on May 23, 2024.
- Michaud, Stephen; Aynesworth, Hugh (October 1989). Ted Bundy: Conversations with a Killer (Paperback ed.). New York City: Signet Books. ISBN 978-0-451-16355-4. Transcripts of the authors' Death Row interviews with Bundy
