= Ted Bundy =

American serial killer (1946–1989)

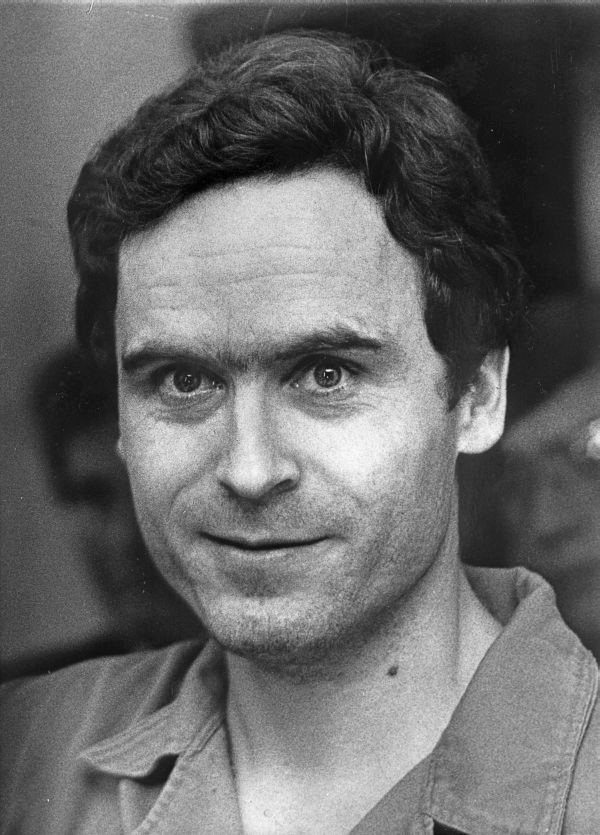
- Bundy in 1978
- Born: Theodore Robert Cowell; November 24, 1946; Burlington, Vermont, U.S.
- Died: January 24, 1989 (aged 42); Bradford County, Florida, U.S.
- Other names: Chris Hagen; Kenneth Misner; Officer Roseland; Richard Burton; Campus Killer; Lady Killer; Rolf Miller
- Education: University of Washington (BA)
- Spouse: Carole Ann Boone (m. 1980; div. 1986)
- Children: 1
- Status: Executed by electrocution
- Motive: Control; possession; necrophilia
- Convictions: First-degree murder (3 counts); Attempted first-degree murder (3 counts); Aggravated kidnapping; Burglary
- Penalty: Death (two in 1979, one in 1980); 1 to 15 years imprisonment (1976)
- Escaped: First escape: June 7, 1977 – June 13, 1977; Second escape: December 30, 1977 – February 15, 1978

Details
- Victims: Murdered: 20 confirmed by police (17 before arrest, 3 after second escape); 30 confessed to in total; 36 or more suspected victims overall; Survivors: 3 bludgeoned; 1 raped and bludgeoned; 1 kidnapped
- Span of crimes: January 4, 1974 – February 9, 1978
- Country: United States
- States: Colorado; Florida; Idaho; Oregon; Utah; Washington
- Date apprehended: Arrested: August 16, 1975; Capture after first escape: June 13, 1977; Capture after second escape: February 15, 1978

Theodore Robert Bundy (né Cowell; November 24, 1946 – January 24, 1989), also known by the alias Chris Hagen, was an American serial killer who kidnapped, raped, and murdered dozens of young women and girls between 1974 and 1978. His modus operandi typically consisted of convincing his target that he was in need of assistance or duping them into believing he was an authority figure. He would then lure his victim to his vehicle, at which point he would bludgeon them unconscious, then restrain them with handcuffs before driving them to a remote location to be sexually assaulted and killed.

Bundy killed his first definitively-known victim in February 1974 in Washington State, and his later crimes stretched to Oregon, Colorado, Utah, Idaho, and Florida. He frequently revisited the bodies of his victims, grooming and performing sex acts on the corpses until decomposition and destruction by wild animals made further interactions impossible. Along with the murders, Bundy was also a prolific burglar, and on a few occasions he broke into homes at night and bludgeoned, maimed, strangled, and sexually assaulted the occupants in their sleep.

In 1975, Bundy was arrested and jailed in Utah for aggravated kidnapping and attempted criminal assault. He then became a suspect in a progressively longer list of unsolved homicides in several states. Facing murder charges in Colorado, Bundy engineered two dramatic escapes and committed further assaults in Florida, including three murders, before being recaptured in 1978. For the Florida homicides, he received three death sentences in two trials. Bundy was executed in the electric chair at Florida State Prison, in Bradford County, on January 24, 1989.

Biographer Ann Rule characterized Bundy as "a sadistic sociopath who took pleasure from another human's pain and the control he had over his victims, to the point of death and even after." He once described himself as "the most cold-hearted son of a bitch you'll ever meet", a statement with which attorney Polly Nelson, a member of his last defense team, agreed. She wrote that "Ted was the very definition of heartless evil."

== Early life ==
=== Childhood ===
Ted Bundy was born Theodore Robert Cowell on November 24, 1946, to Eleanor Louise Cowell at the Elizabeth Lund Home for Unwed Mothers in Burlington, Vermont, where he was left for two months. His mother considered putting him up for adoption, but his grandfather made the decision to bring him into the family in Philadelphia. His biological father's identity has never been confirmed; his original birth certificate apparently assigns paternity to a salesman and United States Air Force veteran named Lloyd Marshall, though a copy of it listed his father as unknown. Louise claimed she had met a war veteran named Jack Worthington, who abandoned her after she became pregnant. Louise's younger sister Audrey described Worthington as someone who appeared to be a "nice reputable person" but who refused to pay child support. Census records reveal that several men by the name of John Worthington and Lloyd Marshall lived near Louise when Bundy was conceived. Some family members expressed suspicions that Bundy was sired by Louise's own father, Samuel Cowell. In the documentary film Crazy, Not Insane (2020), psychiatrist Dorothy Otnow Lewis claimed she received a sample of Bundy's blood and that a DNA test had confirmed that he was not the product of incest.

For the first three years of his life, Bundy lived in the Roxborough neighborhood of Philadelphia with his maternal grandparents, Samuel Knecht Cowell (1898–1983) and Eleanor Miriam Longstreet (1895–1971). The couple raised him as their son to avoid the social stigma that accompanied childbirth outside of wedlock at the time. Family, friends, and young Bundy were told that his grandparents were his parents and that his mother was his older sister. Bundy eventually discovered the truth. Accounts of the circumstances varied; he told a girlfriend that a cousin showed him a copy of his birth certificate after calling him a "bastard", but later told biographers Stephen Michaud and Hugh Aynesworth that he had found the certificate himself. Psychologist Al Carlisle said that Bundy found his birth certificate at age 14. Biographer and true crime writer Ann Rule, who knew Bundy personally, wrote that he did not find out about his true parentage until 1969, when he located his original birth record in Vermont. Bundy expressed a lifelong resentment toward his mother for never telling him about his real father, and for leaving him to discover the truth about his paternity for himself.

In some interviews, Bundy spoke warmly of his grandparents and told Rule that he "identified with", "respected", and "clung to" his grandfather Samuel. Later, in 1987, he and other family members told attorneys that Samuel was a tyrannical bully who beat his wife and dog, swung neighborhood cats by their tails, and expressed racist and xenophobic attitudes. In one instance, Samuel reportedly threw his daughter Julia down a flight of stairs for oversleeping. He would sometimes speak aloud to unseen presences, and at least once flew into a violent rage when the question of Bundy's paternity was raised. Bundy described his grandmother as a timid and obedient woman who periodically underwent electroconvulsive therapy for depression and suffered from agoraphobia toward the end of her life.

These descriptions of Bundy's grandparents have been questioned in more recent investigations. Some locals in Roxborough remembered Samuel as a "fine man" and expressed bewilderment at the reports of him being violent. "The characterization that [Sam] was a raging alcoholic and animal abuser was a convenient characterization used to make people justify why Ted was the way he was," said one of Bundy's cousins. "From my limited exposure to him, nothing could be farther from the truth. His daughters loved him dearly and had nothing but fond memories of him." In addition, Louise's younger sister Audrey Cowell stated that their mother could not leave her home because she suffered a stroke due to being overweight and was not mentally ill.

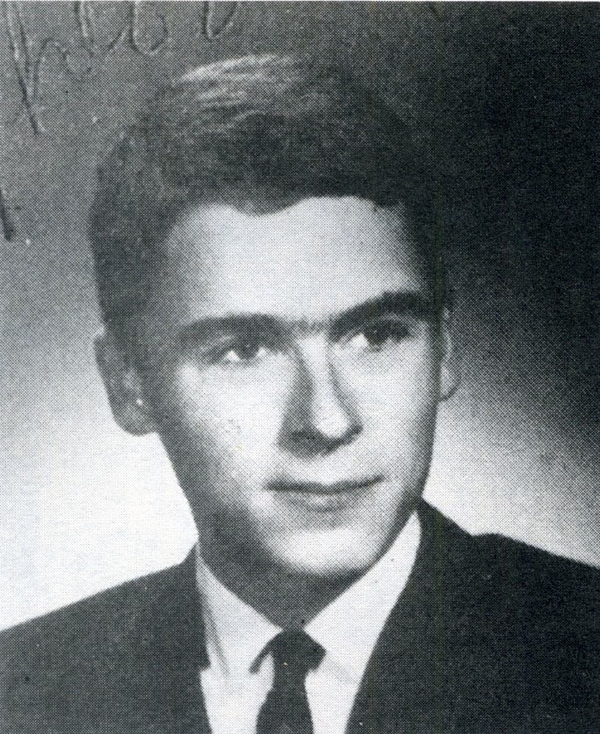
Bundy as a high school senior in 1965

In 1950, Louise changed her surname from Cowell to Nelson and, at the urging of multiple family members, left Philadelphia with her son to live with cousins Alan and Jane Scott in Tacoma, Washington. The following year she met Johnny Culpepper Bundy (1921–2007), a hospital cook, at an adult singles night at Tacoma's First Methodist Church. They married later that year and Johnny formally adopted Bundy. Johnny and Louise conceived four children together, and though Johnny tried to include his adopted son in camping trips and other family activities, Bundy remained distant from him. Bundy would later complain to a girlfriend that Johnny "was not his real father", "wasn't very bright", and "didn't make much money."

Bundy exhibited disturbing behavior at an early age. Louise's youngest sister, who was aged 15 at the time, recalled awakening from a nap to find herself surrounded by knives from the kitchen, and three-year-old Bundy standing by the bed, smiling. Sandi Holt, a childhood neighbor in Tacoma, recalled Bundy as a "mean-spirited kid" who "liked to inflict pain and suffering and fear." Holt recalled Bundy engaging in animal cruelty by hanging a stray cat from his backyard clothesline and setting it on fire with lighter fluid. She also claimed that Bundy would take younger children from his Tacoma neighborhood into the woods, force them to strip, and proceeded to terrorize them: "You'd hear them screaming for blocks." Bundy reportedly built makeshift punji traps around the neighborhood, injuring at least one girl.

According to Holt, Bundy was teased for having a speech impediment as a boy. Accounts of Bundy's social life varied. He told Michaud and Aynesworth that he "chose to be alone" as an adolescent because he was unable to understand interpersonal relationships; he also claimed to have no natural sense of how to develop friendships. "I didn't know what made people want to be friends", Bundy claimed. "I didn't know what underlay social interactions." "Some people perceived me as being shy and introverted," he said. "I didn't go to dances. I didn't go on the beer drinking outings. I was a pretty, you might call me straight, but not a social outcast in any way." During his time at Hunt Junior High School, Bundy endured "merciless teasing" from his classmates, who poured cold water on him as he showered in privacy in a stall; shunning the open showers where the rest of his classmates showered. Classmates from Woodrow Wilson High School told Rule that Bundy was "well known and well liked" there, "a medium-sized fish in a large pond." His only significant athletic avocation was downhill skiing, which he pursued enthusiastically with stolen equipment and forged lift tickets. During high school, Bundy was arrested at least twice on suspicion of burglary and motor vehicle theft. At age 18, the details of these incidents were expunged from his record, as is customary in Washington and many other states.

Bundy varied his recollections of his childhood exposure to adult material in later years. He told Lewis and conservative commentator James Dobson prior to his execution that accessing his grandfather's pornographic magazines contributed to his violence. To Michaud and Aynesworth, he described picking through trash barrels in search of pictures of naked women. To attorney and author Polly Nelson, he said that he perused detective magazines and crime novels for stories that involved sexual violence, particularly when the stories were illustrated with pictures of dead or maimed women. In a letter to Ann Rule, however, he asserted that he "never, ever read fact-detective magazines, and shuddered at the thought that anyone would." Bob Keppel wrote that Bundy was a voracious reader of detective magazines and that if "Ann Rule… only knew that her research educated the very partner she sat next to at the crisis clinic." Bundy once told Michaud that he would consume large quantities of alcohol and "canvass the community" late at night in search of undraped windows where he could observe women undressing, or "whatever [else] could be seen." Carlisle claimed that Bundy "started fantasizing about women he saw while window peeping or elsewhere [and] mimicking the accents of some politicians he listened to on the radio. In essence, he was fantasizing about being someone else, someone important."

=== University years ===
After graduating from high school in 1965, Bundy attended the University of Puget Sound (UPS) for one year before transferring to the University of Washington (UW) to study Chinese. In 1967 he became romantically involved with a UW classmate, Diane Edwards (identified in Bundy biographies by several pseudonyms, most commonly "Stephanie Brooks"). Bundy later described Edwards as "the only woman I ever really loved." In the summer, Bundy worked at a yacht club where he befriended an older employee who suspected him of stealing from drunk patrons and sneaking girls into the club's "crow's nest" for "hanky-panky".

In early 1968, Bundy dropped out of college and worked a series of minimum-wage jobs. He also volunteered at the Seattle office of Nelson Rockefeller's presidential campaign and became Arthur Fletcher's driver and bodyguard during Fletcher's campaign for Lieutenant Governor of Washington State. Edwards graduated in the spring of 1968 and left Washington for San Francisco. Bundy visited her later that year after he earned a scholarship to study Chinese at Stanford University that summer.

In August, Bundy attended the 1968 Republican National Convention in Miami. Shortly thereafter, Edwards ended their relationship and returned to her family home in California, frustrated by what she described as Bundy's immaturity and lack of ambition. Lewis would later pinpoint this crisis as "probably the pivotal time in his development." Devastated by the breakup, Bundy traveled to Colorado and then farther east, visiting relatives in Arkansas and Philadelphia and enrolling for one semester at Temple University to be closer to his grandfather. During his studies, he frequently visited New York City, where he immersed himself in violent pornographic literature while nursing his wounds from the breakup. It was also at this time, Rule believed, that Bundy discovered his true parentage in Vermont.

Bundy returned to Washington in the fall of 1969, when he met Elizabeth Kloepfer (identified in Bundy literature as "Meg Anders," "Beth Archer" or "Liz Kendall"), a single mother from Ogden, Utah, who worked as a secretary at the UW School of Medicine. Their tumultuous relationship would continue well past his initial incarceration in Utah in 1976. Bundy became a father figure to Kloepfer's daughter Molly, who was three years old when he started dating her mother; he remained in her life until she was aged 10, after he had been arrested. As an adult, Molly wrote of incidents beginning at age 7 in which Bundy was abusive or sexually inappropriate with her. Her accounts include Bundy hitting her in the face, knocking her down, putting her at risk of drowning, indecent exposure and sexual touching disguised as accidents or "games."

In mid-1970, Bundy, now focused and goal-oriented, re-enrolled at UW, this time as a psychology major. He became an honor student and was well regarded by his professors. In 1971, he took a job at Seattle's Suicide Hotline Crisis Center. There, he met and worked alongside Ann Rule, a former Seattle police officer and aspiring crime writer who would later write one of the definitive Bundy biographies, The Stranger Beside Me (1980). Rule saw nothing disturbing in Bundy's personality at the time; she described him as "kind, solicitous, and empathetic."

After graduating from UW in 1972, Bundy joined Governor Daniel J. Evans's re-election campaign. Posing as a college student, he shadowed Evans' opponent, former governor Albert Rosellini, and recorded his stump speeches for analysis by Evans's team. After Evans was re-elected, Bundy was hired as an assistant to Ross Davis, chairman of the Washington State Republican Party. Davis thought well of Bundy and described him as "smart, aggressive ... and a believer in the system." In early 1973, despite mediocre LSAT scores, Bundy was accepted into the law schools of UPS and the University of Utah (U of U) on the strength of letters of recommendation from Evans, Davis and several UW psychology professors.

During a trip to California on Republican Party business in the summer of 1973, Bundy rekindled his relationship with Edwards. She marveled at his transformation into a serious and dedicated professional, seemingly on the cusp of a significant legal and political career. Bundy continued to date Kloepfer as well; neither woman was aware of the other's existence. In the fall of 1973, Bundy matriculated at UPS Law School, and continued courting Edwards, who flew to Seattle several times to stay with him. They discussed marriage; at one point he introduced her to Davis as his fiancée.

In January 1974, Bundy abruptly broke off all contact with Edwards; her phone calls and letters went unreturned. When she finally reached him by phone a month later, she demanded to know why he had unilaterally ended their relationship without explanation. In a flat, calm voice, he replied, "Diane, I have no idea what you mean," and hung up. She never heard from him again. Bundy later explained, "I just wanted to prove to myself that I could have married her"; but Edwards concluded in retrospect that "Ted's high-power courtship in the latter part of 1973 had been deliberately planned, that he had waited all those years to be in a position of where he could make her fall in love with him, so that he could drop her, reject her, as she had rejected him." By then, Bundy had begun skipping classes at law school. By April, he had stopped attending entirely, as young women began to disappear in the Pacific Northwest.

=== First murders ===
There is no consensus as to when or where Bundy began killing women. He told different stories to different people and refused to divulge the specifics of his earliest crimes, even as he confessed in graphic detail to dozens of later murders in the days preceding his execution. Bundy told Nelson that he attempted his first kidnapping in Ocean City, New Jersey, in 1969, but did not kill anyone until some time in 1971 in Seattle. He told psychologist Art Norman that he killed two women in Atlantic City while visiting family in Philadelphia in 1969. Bundy hinted to homicide detective Robert D. Keppel that he committed a murder in Seattle in 1972 and another murder in 1973 that involved a hitchhiker near Tumwater, but he refused to elaborate. Rule and Keppel both believed that he might have started killing as a teenager. Bundy's earliest documented homicides were committed in 1974, when he was 27. By his own admission, he had by then mastered the necessary skills – in the era before DNA profiling – to leave minimal incriminating forensic evidence at crime scenes.

== Murder spree in the Western states ==
=== Washington, Oregon ===
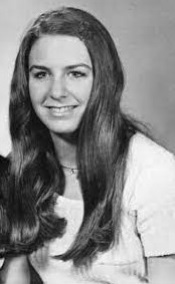
Lynda Ann Healy

Shortly after midnight on January 4, 1974, around the time that he terminated his relationship with Edwards, Bundy entered the basement apartment of 18-year-old Karen Sparks (often identified as "Joni Lenz," "Mary Adams" and "Terri Caldwell" in Bundy literature), a dancer and student at UW in Seattle's University District. After bludgeoning Sparks with a metal rod from her bed frame, he sexually assaulted her with the same rod, causing extensive internal injuries and rupturing her bladder. Sparks remained unconscious in the hospital for ten days and although she survived, she was left with permanent brain damage with significant loss to her vision and hearing. In the early morning hours of February 1, Bundy broke into the basement apartment of 21-year-old Lynda Ann Healy, a UW undergraduate who broadcast morning radio weather reports for skiers. He beat her unconscious, dressed her in blue jeans, a white blouse and boots, and carried her away. He later stated that he drove Healy to a secluded area, where he raped and murdered her before dumping her body.

During the first half of 1974, female college students disappeared at the rate of about one per month. On March 12, Donna Gail Manson, a 19-year-old student at Evergreen State College in Olympia, 60 miles (95 km) southwest of Seattle, left her dormitory to attend a jazz concert on campus but never arrived. Bundy claimed that he burned Manson's skull in his girlfriend's fireplace "down to the last ash" in "a fit of ... paranoia and cleanliness." On April 17, 18-year-old Susan Elaine Rancourt disappeared while on her way to her dorm room after an evening advisors' meeting at Central Washington State College in Ellensburg, 110 miles (175 km) southeast of Seattle. Two female Central Washington students later came forward to report encounters—one on the night of Rancourt's disappearance, the other three nights earlier—with a man wearing a sling, who was asking for help carrying a load of books to his brown or tan Volkswagen Beetle.

On May 6, 20-year-old Roberta Kathleen Parks left her dormitory at Oregon State University in Corvallis, 260 miles (420 km) south of Seattle, to have coffee with friends at the Memorial Union, but never arrived. Bundy claimed that he spotted Parks in the cafeteria and persuaded her to go with him to a bar. After they got into his car, he tied and gagged Parks and drove her back to Washington to be killed, raping her twice on the way. On June 1, Brenda Carol Ball, aged 22, disappeared after leaving the Flame Tavern in Burien, near Seattle–Tacoma International Airport. She was last seen in the parking lot, talking to a brown-haired man with his arm in a sling. Bundy later stated he brought Ball back to his residence where they had a "consensual" sexual encounter before he strangled her while she was sleeping; although this failed to explain the damage done to her skull. Investigators from Seattle and King County grew increasingly concerned. There was no significant physical evidence, and the missing women had little in common apart from similar appearance: young, attractive, white college students with long hair parted in the middle.

In the early hours of June 11, 18-year-old UW student Georgann Hawkins vanished while walking down a brightly lit alley between her boyfriend's dormitory residence and her sorority house. The next morning, three Seattle homicide detectives and a criminalist combed the entire alleyway on their hands and knees, finding nothing. Bundy later told Keppel that he lured Hawkins to his car and knocked her unconscious with a crowbar. After handcuffing her, he drove her to Issaquah, a suburb 20 miles (30 km) east of Seattle, where he strangled her and spent the entire night with her body. The next afternoon he returned to the UW alley and, in the very midst of a major crime scene investigation, located and gathered Hawkins' earrings and one of her shoes where he had left them in the adjoining parking lot and departed, unobserved. "It was a feat so brazen," wrote Keppel, "that it astonishes police even today." Bundy said he revisited Hawkins' corpse on three occasions.

After Hawkins' disappearance was publicized, witnesses came forward to report seeing a man on crutches, with a leg cast and carrying a briefcase, in an alley behind a nearby dormitory on the night of her disappearance. One woman recalled that the man asked her to help him carry the case to his car, a light brown Volkswagen Beetle. During this period, Bundy was working in Olympia as the assistant director of the Seattle Crime Prevention Advisory Committee, where he wrote a pamphlet for women on rape prevention. Later, he worked at the Department of Emergency Services (DES), a state government agency involved in the search for the missing women. At the DES he met and began dating Carole Ann Boone (1947–2018), a twice-divorced mother who would play an important role in the final phase of his life six years later.

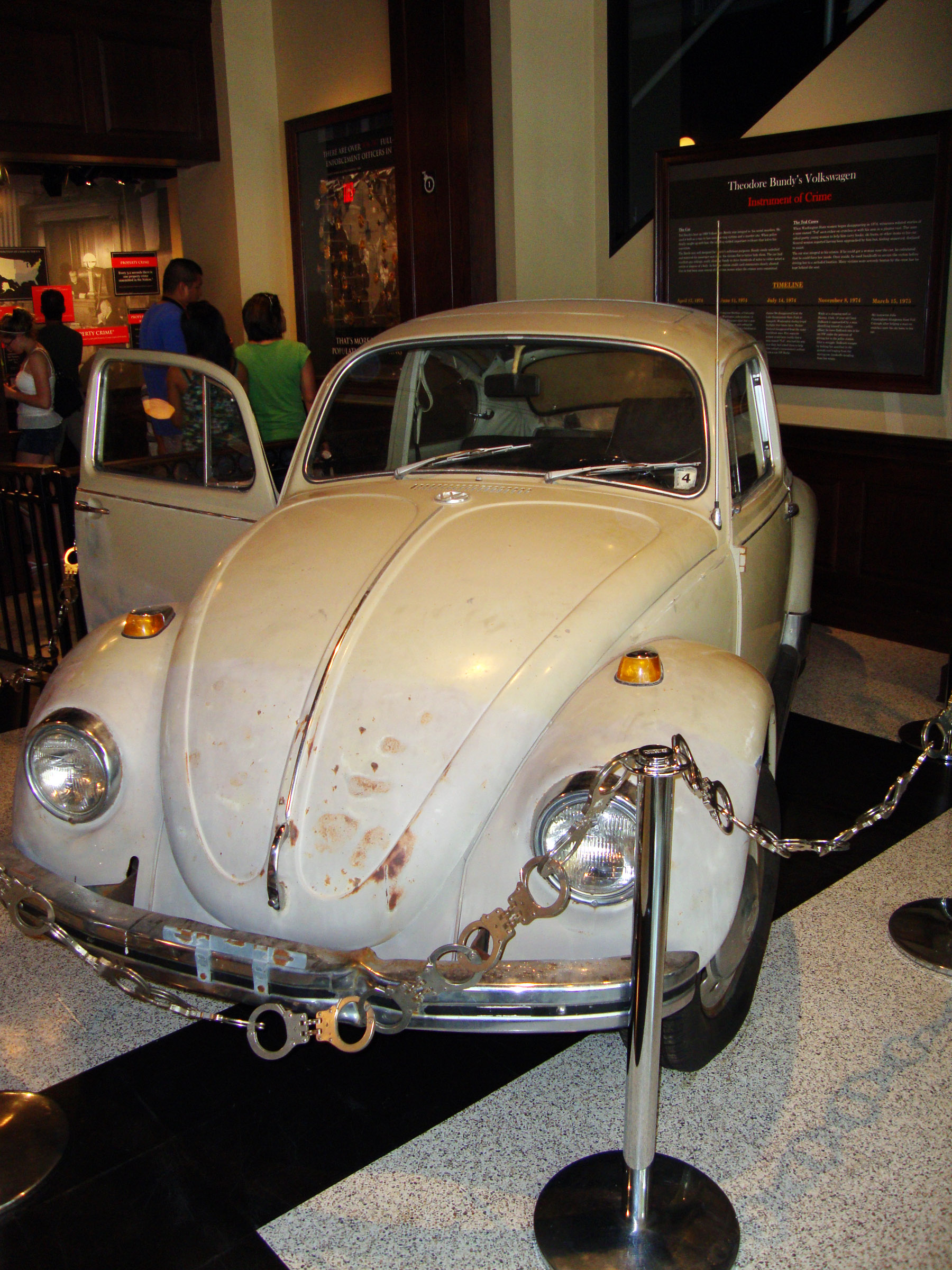
Bundy's 1968 Volkswagen Beetle, in which he committed many of his crimes. The vehicle was on display at the now-defunct National Museum of Crime and Punishment, and is now at the Alcatraz East Crime Museum in Pigeon Forge, Tennessee.

Reports of the brutal attack on Sparks and the six missing women appeared prominently in newspapers and on television throughout Washington and Oregon. Fear spread among the population; hitchhiking by young women dropped sharply. Pressure mounted on law enforcement agencies, but the lack of physical evidence severely hampered them. Police would not provide reporters with the little information that was available for fear of compromising the investigation. Further similarities between the victims were noted: the disappearances all took place at night, usually near ongoing construction work and were within a week of midterm or final exams. All of the victims were wearing slacks or blue jeans when they disappeared, and at many crime scenes there were sightings of a man wearing a cast or a sling and driving a brown or tan Volkswagen Beetle.

The Washington and Oregon murders culminated on July 14 with the abductions in broad daylight of two women from a crowded beach at Lake Sammamish State Park in Issaquah. Four female witnesses described an attractive young man wearing a white tennis outfit with his left arm in a sling, speaking with a light accent, perhaps Canadian or British. Introducing himself as "Ted", he asked their help in unloading a sailboat from his tan or bronze-colored Volkswagen Beetle. Three refused; one accompanied him as far as his car, saw that there was no sailboat and fled. Three additional witnesses saw "Ted" approach 23-year-old Janice Ann Ott, a probation caseworker at the King County Juvenile Court, and watched her leave the beach in his company. About four hours later, Denise Marie Naslund, a 19-year-old woman who was studying to become a computer programmer, left a picnic to go to the restroom and never returned. Bundy told Michaud and FBI agent William Hagmaier that Ott was still alive when he returned with Naslund and that he forced one to watch as he assaulted and murdered the other, but he later denied this in an interview with Lewis on the eve of his execution.

King County police, finally possessing a detailed description of their suspect and his car, posted fliers throughout the Seattle area. A composite sketch was printed in regional newspapers and broadcast on local television stations. Kloepfer, Rule, a DES employee and a UW psychology professor all recognized the profile, the sketch and the car, and reported Bundy as a possible suspect; but detectives—who were receiving up to 200 tips per day—thought it unlikely that a clean-cut law student with no adult criminal record could be the perpetrator. On September 6, two grouse hunters discovered the skeletal remains of Ott and Naslund near a service road in Issaquah, 2 miles (3 km) east of Lake Sammamish State Park. An extra femur and several vertebrae found at the site were later identified by Bundy as those of Hawkins. Six months later, forestry students from Green River Community College discovered the skulls and mandibles of Healy, Rancourt, Parks, and Ball on Taylor Mountain, where Bundy frequently hiked, just east of Issaquah. Manson's remains were never recovered.

=== Idaho, Utah, Colorado ===
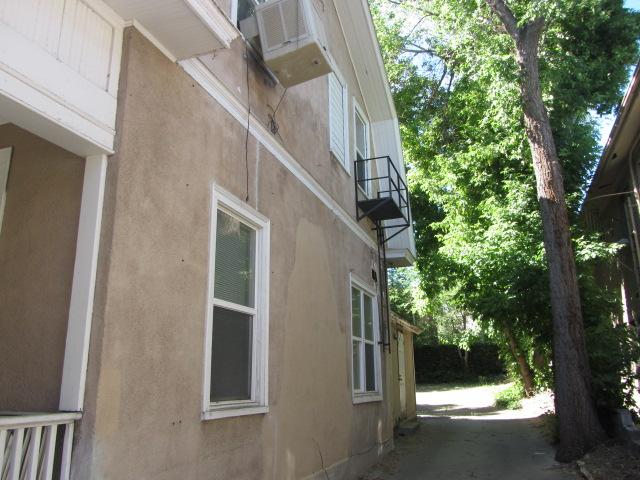
Rooming house in Salt Lake City where Bundy lived from September 1974 to October 1975, showing the fire escape used to sneak into his room and windows to the utility room where he concealed photo souvenirs of his murders

In August 1974, Bundy received a second acceptance from U of U Law School and moved to Salt Lake City, Utah, leaving Kloepfer in Seattle. While he called Kloepfer often, he dated "at least a dozen" other women. As he studied the first-year law curriculum a second time, Bundy was devastated to find out that the other students "had something, some intellectual capacity" that he did not. He found the classes completely incomprehensible. "It was a great disappointment to me," he said. A new string of homicides began the following month, including two that would remain undiscovered until Bundy confessed to them shortly before his execution.

On September 2, Bundy raped and strangled a still-unidentified hitchhiker in Idaho, then returned the next day to photograph and dismember the corpse before disposing of the remains in a nearby river. On October 2, he abducted 16-year-old Nancy Wilcox in Holladay, Utah, a suburb of Salt Lake City. Bundy stated that Wilcox was walking on a poorly lit "main roadway" when he parked his car and forced her into an orchard at knifepoint. He then restrained her, put her into his vehicle and drove back to his apartment, where he allegedly kept her for twenty-four hours. Bundy informed investigators that her remains were buried near Capitol Reef National Park, some 200 miles (320 km) south of Holladay, but they were never found.

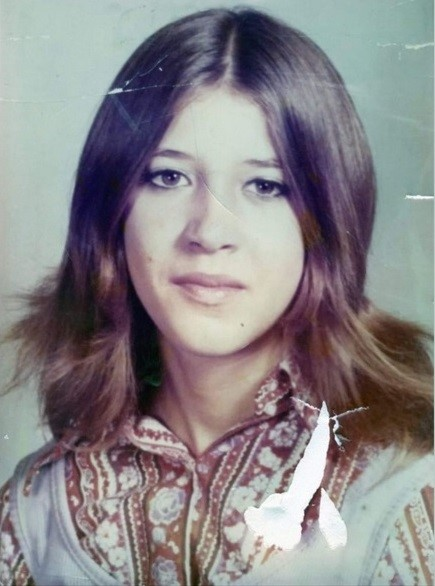
Laura Ann Aime

On October 18, Melissa Anne Smith—the 17-year-old daughter of the police chief of Midvale, another Salt Lake City suburb—disappeared after leaving a pizza parlor at around 9:30 p.m. Her nude body was found in a nearby mountainous area nine days later; post-mortem examination suggested that she had remained alive for up to seven days following her disappearance. On October 31, Laura Ann Aime, also aged 17, disappeared in Lehi, 25 miles (40 km) south of Salt Lake City, after leaving a Halloween party by herself just after midnight; she was last seen trying to hitchhike. Her nude body was found by hikers 9 miles (14 km) to the northeast in American Fork Canyon on Thanksgiving Day. The medical examiner estimated that Aime had died on November 20; twenty days after her disappearance. Even though Bundy had confessed to the murders of Aime and Smith, it was not until 2026 that forensic DNA testing confirmed that both women were among his victims. Both Smith and Aime had been beaten, raped, sodomized, and strangled with nylon stockings. Years later, Bundy described his post-mortem rituals with the corpses of Smith and Aime, including shampooing their hair and applying makeup.

In the late afternoon of November 8, Bundy approached 18-year-old telephone operator Carol DaRonch at Fashion Place Mall in Murray, less than a mile from the Midvale restaurant where Smith was last seen. He identified himself as "Officer Roseland" of the Murray Police Department, told DaRonch that someone had attempted to break into her car and asked her to accompany him to the station to file a complaint. When DaRonch pointed out to Bundy that he was driving on a road that did not lead to the police station, he immediately pulled onto the shoulder and attempted to handcuff her. During their struggle, he inadvertently fastened both handcuffs to the same wrist, and DaRonch was able to open the car door and escape.

Later that evening, Debra Jean Kent, a 17-year-old student at Viewmont High School in Bountiful, 20 miles (30 km) north of Murray, disappeared after leaving a theater production at the school to pick up her brother. The school's drama teacher and a student told police that "a stranger" had asked each of them to come out to the parking lot to identify a car. Another student later saw the same man pacing in the rear of the auditorium, and the drama teacher spotted him again shortly before the end of the play. Outside the auditorium, investigators found a key that unlocked the handcuffs removed from DaRonch's wrist. Bundy eventually admitted to abducting Kent and keeping her at his apartment for a day, stating she was alive "during half of it."

In November, Kloepfer called King County police a second time after reading that young women were disappearing in towns surrounding Salt Lake City. Detective Randy Hergesheimer of the Major Crimes division interviewed her in detail. By then, Bundy had risen considerably on the King County hierarchy of suspicion, but the Lake Sammamish witness considered most reliable by detectives failed to identify him from a photo lineup. In December, Kloepfer called the Salt Lake County Sheriff's Office and repeated her suspicions. Bundy's name was added to their list of suspects, but at that time no credible forensic evidence linked him to the Utah murders. In January 1975, Bundy returned to Seattle after his final exams and spent a week with Kloepfer, who did not tell him that she had reported him to police on three occasions. She made plans to visit him in Salt Lake City in August.

Caryn Campbell: Bundy's 14th documented murder victim and the subject of his first homicide indictment

In 1975, Bundy shifted much of his criminal activity eastward, from his base in Utah to Colorado. On January 12, a 23-year-old registered nurse named Caryn Eileen Campbell disappeared while walking down a well-lit hallway between the elevator and her room at the Wildwood Inn (now the Wildwood Lodge) in Snowmass Village, 400 miles (640 km) southeast of Salt Lake City. Her nude body was found a month later next to a dirt road just outside the resort. According to the coroner's report, she had been killed by blows to her head from a blunt instrument that left distinctive linear grooved depressions on her skull; her assailant had slit her left earlobe and her body also bore deep cuts from a sharp weapon.

On March 15, 100 miles (160 km) northeast of Snowmass Village, Vail ski instructor Julie Lyle Cunningham, aged 26, disappeared while walking from her apartment to a dinner date with a friend. Bundy later told Colorado investigators that he approached Cunningham on crutches and asked her to help carry his ski boots to his car, where he clubbed and handcuffed her before sexually assaulting her at a secondary site near Rifle, 90 miles (140 km) west of Vail. Weeks later, he made the six-hour drive from Salt Lake City to revisit her remains.

Denise Lynn Oliverson, aged 25, disappeared near the Utah–Colorado border in Grand Junction on April 6 while riding her bicycle to her parents' house; her bike and sandals were found under a viaduct near a railroad bridge. Bundy stated he abducted Oliverson, killed her in his car near the Utah state line and dumped her body in the Colorado River. This admission was supported by gas receipts, which showed that he was in the city on the same day that Oliverson went missing. On May 6, Bundy parked outside of the Alameda Junior High School in Pocatello, Idaho, 160 miles (255 km) north of Salt Lake City, and after seeing 12-year-old Lynette Dawn Culver walking alone, lured her into his vehicle before driving her to his Holiday Inn hotel room. There he raped Culver and drowned her in the bathtub. He disposed of her body in the Snake River north of Pocatello. Bundy reportedly provided intimate details about Lynette's personal life in his confession.

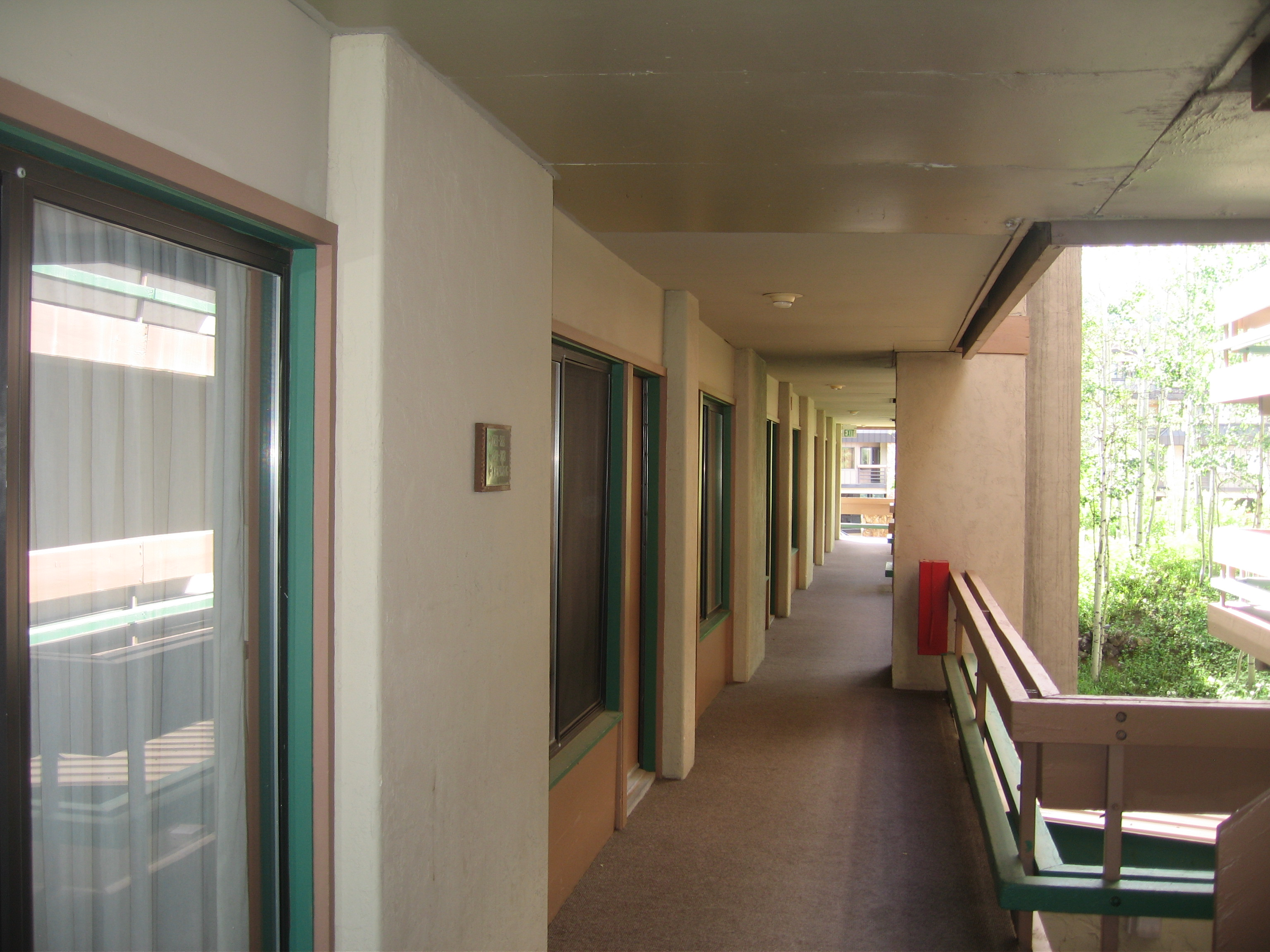
Caryn Campbell disappeared while walking down this brightly lit hallway to her hotel room in January 1975.

In mid-May, three of Bundy's DES co-workers, including Boone, visited him in Salt Lake City and stayed for a week in his apartment. He subsequently spent a week in Seattle with Kloepfer in early June and they discussed getting married the following Christmas. Again, Kloepfer made no mention of her multiple discussions with authorities in King and Salt Lake counties. Bundy disclosed neither his ongoing relationship with Boone nor a concurrent romance with a woman named Leslie Knudson (sometimes spelled "Knutson"; also known in various accounts as either "Kim Andrews" or "Sharon Auer").

On June 28, 15-year-old Susan Curtis vanished from the campus of Brigham Young University in Provo, 45 miles (70 km) south of Salt Lake City. Her murder became Bundy's last confession, tape-recorded moments before he entered the execution chamber. The bodies of victims Wilcox, Kent, Cunningham, Oliverson, Culver, and Curtis were never recovered. In August 1975, Bundy was baptized into the Church of Jesus Christ of Latter-day Saints, although he was not an active participant in services and ignored most church rules. He would later be excommunicated following his 1976 kidnapping conviction. When asked his religious preference after his arrest, Bundy answered "Methodist," the religion of his childhood.

In Washington State, investigators were still struggling to analyze the Pacific Northwest murder spree that had ended as abruptly as it had begun. In an effort to make sense of an overwhelming mass of data, they resorted to the then-innovative strategy of compiling a database. They employed the King County payroll computer, a "huge, primitive machine" by contemporary standards, but the only one available for their use. After inputting the many lists they had compiled—classmates and acquaintances of each victim, Volkswagen owners named "Ted," known sex offenders and so on—they queried the computer for coincidences. Out of thousands of names, 26 turned up on four lists; one was Bundy. Detectives also manually compiled a list of their 100 "best" suspects, and Bundy was on that list as well. He was "literally at the top of the pile" of suspects when word came from Utah of his arrest.

== Arrest and first trial ==
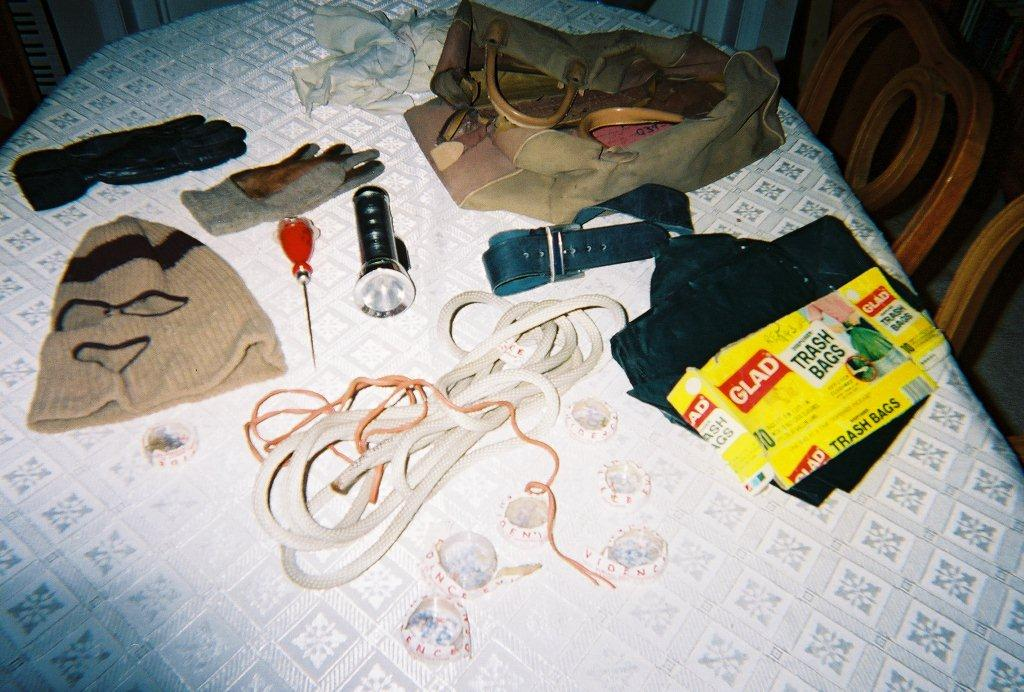
Items found in Bundy's Volkswagen, Utah, 1975

On August 16, 1975, Bundy was arrested by Utah Highway Patrol officer Bob Hayward in Granger, another Salt Lake City suburb. Hayward observed Bundy cruising a residential area in his Volkswagen Beetle during the pre-dawn hours, and fleeing at high speed after seeing the patrol car. He also noticed that the Volkswagen's front passenger seat had been removed and placed on the rear seats. Searching the car, Hayward found a ski mask, a second mask fashioned from pantyhose, a crowbar, handcuffs, trash bags, a coil of rope, an ice pick, and other items initially assumed to be burglary tools. Bundy explained that the ski mask was for skiing, he had found the handcuffs in a dumpster, and the rest were common household items. However, Detective Jerry Thompson remembered a similar suspect and car description from the DaRonch kidnapping in November 1974, and Bundy's name from Kloepfer's phone call a month later. In a search of Bundy's apartment, police found a guide to Colorado ski resorts with a checkmark by the Wildwood Inn, and a brochure that advertised the Viewmont High School play in Bountiful where Kent had disappeared. Police did not have sufficient evidence to detain Bundy, so he was released on his own recognizance. Bundy later said that searchers missed a hidden collection of Polaroid photographs of his victims, which he destroyed after he was released.

Salt Lake City police placed Bundy on twenty-four-hour surveillance, and Thompson flew to Seattle with two other detectives to interview Kloepfer. She told them that in the year prior to Bundy's move to Utah, she had discovered objects that she "couldn't understand" in her house and in Bundy's apartment. These items included crutches, a bag of plaster of Paris that he admitted stealing from a medical supply house, and a meat cleaver that was never used for cooking. Additional objects included surgical gloves, an Oriental knife in a wooden case that he kept in his glove compartment, and a sack full of women's clothing. Bundy was perpetually in debt, and Kloepfer suspected that he had stolen almost everything of significant value that he possessed. When she confronted him over a new TV and stereo, he warned her, "If you tell anyone, I'll break your fucking neck." She said Bundy became "very upset" whenever she considered cutting her hair, which was long and parted in the middle. She would sometimes awaken in the middle of the night to find him under the bed covers with a flashlight, examining her body. He kept a lug wrench, taped halfway up the handle, in the trunk of her car—another Volkswagen Beetle, which he often borrowed—"for protection." The detectives confirmed that Bundy had not been with Kloepfer on any of the nights during which the Pacific Northwest victims had vanished, nor on the day Ott and Naslund were abducted from Lake Sammamish State Park. Shortly thereafter, Kloepfer was interviewed by Seattle homicide detective Kathy McChesney, and learned of the existence of Edwards and her brief engagement to Bundy around Christmas 1973.

In September, Bundy sold his Volkswagen Beetle to a Midvale teenager. Utah police immediately impounded the vehicle, and FBI technicians dismantled and searched it. Hairs were discovered matching samples obtained from Campbell's body. Later, they also identified hair strands "microscopically indistinguishable" from those of Smith and DaRonch. FBI lab specialist Robert Neill concluded that the presence of hair strands in one car matching three different victims who had never met one another would be "a coincidence of mind-boggling rarity."

On October 2, detectives put Bundy into a lineup. DaRonch immediately identified him as "Officer Roseland", and witnesses from Bountiful recognized him as the stranger at the Viewmont High School auditorium. There was insufficient evidence to link him to Kent, whose body had not yet been found, but more than enough evidence to charge him with aggravated kidnapping and attempted criminal assault in the DaRonch case. Bundy denied knowing DaRonch but had no alibi, and was freed on $15,000 bail, paid by his parents, and spent most of the time between indictment and trial in Seattle, living in Kloepfer's house. Seattle police had insufficient evidence to charge him in the Pacific Northwest murders but kept him under close surveillance. "When Ted and I stepped out on the porch to go somewhere," Kloepfer wrote, "so many unmarked police cars started up that it sounded like the beginning of the Indy 500."

In November, the three principal Bundy investigators—Jerry Thompson from Utah, Robert Keppel from Washington, and Michael Fisher from Colorado—met in Aspen, Colorado, and exchanged information with thirty detectives and prosecutors from five states. While officials left the meeting (later referred to as the Aspen Summit) convinced that Bundy was the murderer they sought, they agreed that more hard evidence would be needed before he could be charged with any of the killings.

In February 1976, Bundy stood trial for the DaRonch kidnapping. On the advice of his attorney, John O'Connell, he waived his right to a jury due to the negative publicity surrounding the case. After a four-day bench trial and a weekend of deliberation, Judge Stewart Hanson Jr. found Bundy guilty of kidnapping and assault. In June, he was sentenced to one to fifteen years in the Utah State Prison. In October, Bundy was found hiding in bushes in the prison yard carrying an "escape kit"—road maps, airline schedules, and a Social Security card—and spent several weeks in solitary confinement. Later that month, Colorado authorities charged him with Campbell's murder. After a period of resistance, he waived extradition proceedings and was transferred to Aspen in January 1977.

== Escapes ==
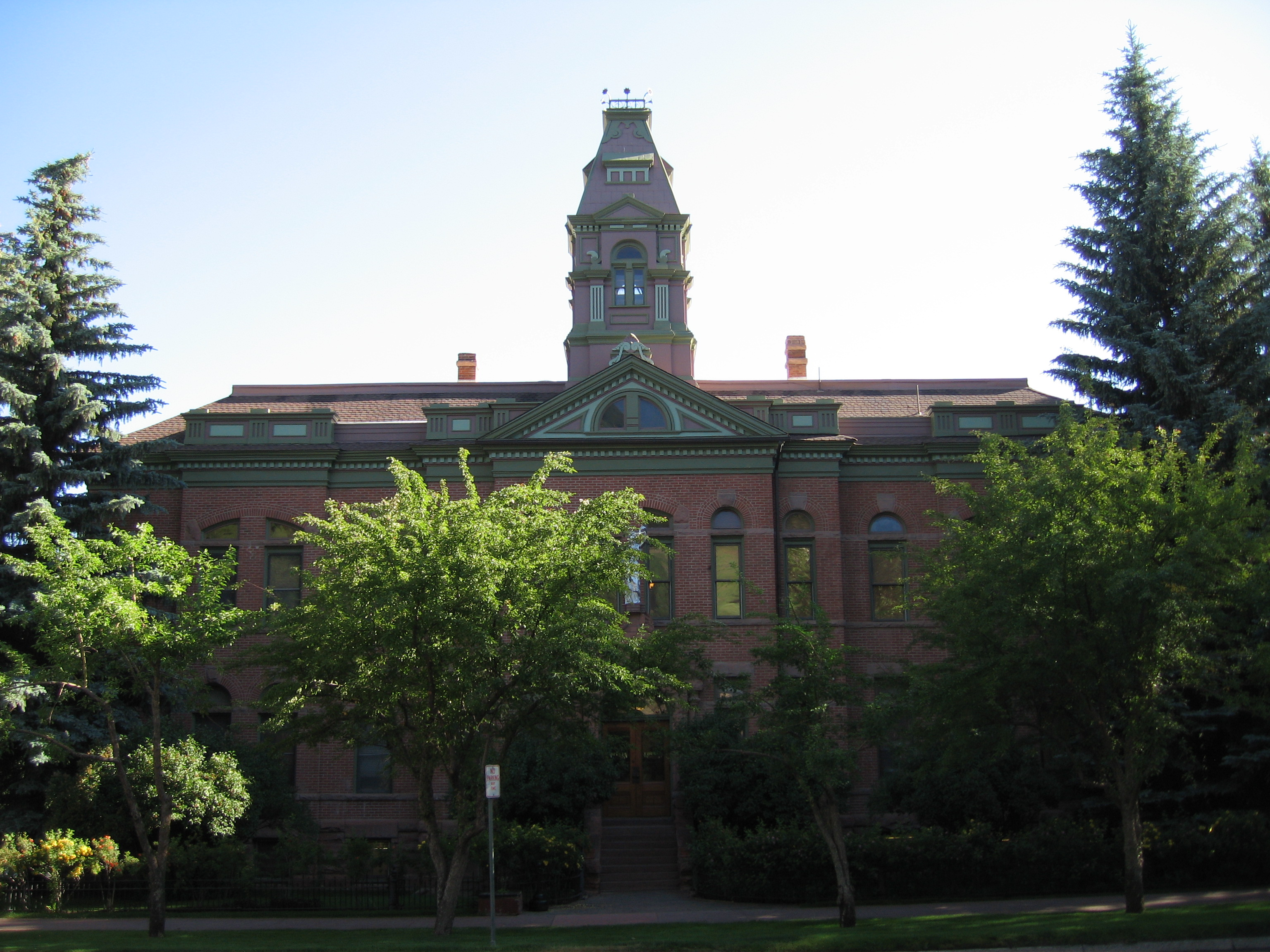
Pitkin County Courthouse, where Bundy jumped from the second window from the left, second story to escape

On June 7, 1977, Bundy was transported 40 miles (64 km) from the Garfield County jail in Glenwood Springs to Pitkin County Courthouse in Aspen for a preliminary hearing. He had elected to serve as his own attorney, and as such was excused by the judge from wearing handcuffs or leg shackles. During a recess, Bundy asked to visit the courthouse's law library to research his case. While shielded from his guards' view behind a bookcase, he opened a window and jumped to the ground from the second story, injuring his right ankle as he landed.

After shedding an outer layer of clothing, Bundy limped through Aspen as roadblocks were being set up on its outskirts, then hiked south onto Aspen Mountain. Near its summit he broke into a hunting cabin and stole food, clothing, and a rifle. The following day, Bundy left the cabin and continued south toward the town of Crested Butte, but became lost in the forest. For two days he wandered aimlessly on the mountain, missing two trails that led downward to his intended destination. On June 10, Bundy broke into a camping trailer on Maroon Lake, 10 miles (16 km) south of Aspen, taking food and a ski parka; however, instead of continuing southward, he walked back north toward Aspen, eluding roadblocks and search parties along the way. Three days later, he stole a car at the edge of an Aspen golf course. Cold, sleep-deprived, and in constant pain from his sprained ankle, Bundy drove back into Aspen, where two police officers noticed his car weaving in and out of its lane and pulled him over. He had been a fugitive for six days. In the car were maps of the mountain area around Aspen that prosecutors were using to demonstrate the location of Campbell's body (as his own attorney, Bundy had rights of discovery), indicating that his escape had been planned.

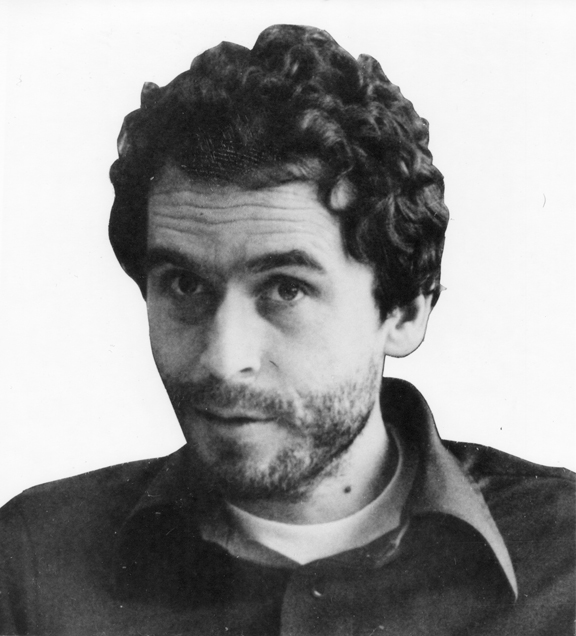
1977 photograph—taken shortly after first escape and recapture—from Bundy's FBI Ten Most Wanted Fugitives poster

Back in jail in Glenwood Springs, Bundy ignored the advice of friends and legal advisors to stay put. The case against him, already weak at best, was deteriorating steadily as pretrial motions consistently resolved in Bundy's favor and significant pieces of evidence were ruled inadmissible. "A more rational defendant might have realized that he stood a good chance of acquittal, and that beating the murder charge in Colorado would probably have dissuaded other prosecutors ... with as little as a year and a half to serve on the DaRonch conviction, had Ted persevered, he could have been a free man." Instead, Bundy assembled a new escape plan. He acquired a detailed floor plan of the Garfield County jail and a hacksaw blade from other inmates. He accumulated $500 in cash, smuggled in over a six-month period by visitors, Boone in particular. During the evenings, while other prisoners were showering, Bundy sawed a hole about one square foot (0.093 m^{2}) between the steel reinforcing bars in his cell's ceiling. Having lost 35 pounds (16 kg), he was able to wriggle through and explore the crawl space above in the weeks that followed. Multiple reports from an informant of movement within the ceiling during the night were not investigated.

By late 1977, Bundy's impending trial had become a cause célèbre in the small town of Aspen, and Bundy filed a motion for a change of venue to Denver. On December 23, the Aspen trial judge granted the request, but to Colorado Springs, where juries had historically been hostile to murder suspects. On the night of December 30, with most of the jail staff on Christmas break and nonviolent prisoners on furlough with their families, Bundy piled books and files on his bed, covered them with a blanket to simulate his sleeping body and climbed into the crawl space. He broke through the ceiling into the apartment of the chief jailer—who was out for the evening with his wife—changed into street clothes from the jailer's closet, and walked out the front door to freedom.

After stealing a car, Bundy drove eastward out of Glenwood Springs, but the car soon broke down in the mountains on Interstate 70. A passing motorist gave him a ride into Vail, 60 miles (97 km) to the east. From there he caught a bus to Denver, where he boarded a morning flight to Chicago. Back in Glenwood Springs, the jail's skeleton crew did not discover the escape until noon on December 31, more than seventeen hours later. By then, Bundy was already in Chicago.

== Florida murders and rearrest ==
From Chicago, Bundy traveled by train to Ann Arbor, Michigan, where he was present in a local tavern on January 2. Five days later, he stole a car and drove south to Atlanta, where he boarded a bus and arrived in Tallahassee, Florida, on the morning of January 8. He stayed for one night at a hotel before renting a room under the alias "Chris Hagen" at a boarding house near the Florida State University (FSU) campus. Bundy later said that he initially resolved to find legitimate employment and refrain from further criminal activity, knowing he could probably remain free and undetected in Florida indefinitely as long as he did not attract the attention of police; but his lone job application, at a construction site, had to be abandoned when he was asked to produce identification. He reverted to his old habits of shoplifting and stealing money and credit cards from women's wallets left in shopping carts at local grocery stores.

=== Chi Omega murders ===
In the early hours of January 15, 1978—one week after his arrival in Tallahassee—Bundy entered FSU's Chi Omega sorority house through a rear door with a faulty lock. Beginning at about 2:45 a.m. he bludgeoned Margaret Elizabeth Bowman, aged 21, with a piece of oak firewood as she slept, then garroted her with a nylon stocking. He then entered the bedroom of 20-year-old Lisa Janet Levy and beat her unconscious, strangled her, tore one of her nipples, bit deeply into her left buttock, and sexually assaulted her with a hair mist bottle. In an adjoining bedroom he attacked Kathy Kleiner, aged 21, breaking her jaw and deeply lacerating her shoulder; and Karen Chandler, aged 21, who suffered a concussion, broken jaw, loss of teeth, and a crushed finger. Chandler and Kleiner survived the attack; Kleiner attributed their survival to automobile headlights illuminating the interior of their room and frightening away the attacker.

Tallahassee detectives determined that the four attacks took place in a total of less than fifteen minutes, within earshot of more than thirty witnesses who heard nothing. After leaving the sorority house, Bundy broke into a basement apartment eight blocks away and attacked 21-year-old FSU student Cheryl Thomas, dislocating her shoulder and fracturing her jaw and skull in five places. She was left with permanent deafness in her left ear and equilibrium damage that ended her dance career. On Thomas' bed, police found a semen stain and a pantyhose "mask" containing two hairs "similar to Bundy's in class and characteristic."

=== Murder of Kimberly Leach ===
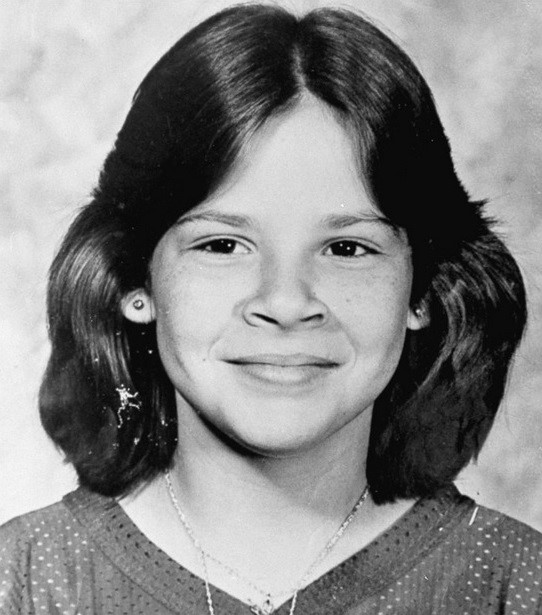
Kimberly Leach

On February 8, Bundy drove 150 miles (240 km) east to Jacksonville in a stolen FSU van. In a parking lot he approached 14-year-old Leslie Parmenter, the daughter of the Jacksonville Police Department's chief of detectives, identifying himself as "Richard Burton, Fire Department," but retreated when Parmenter's older brother arrived and confronted him. That afternoon, he backtracked 60 miles (97 km) westward to Lake City. At Lake City Junior High School the following morning, 12-year-old Kimberly Dianne Leach was summoned to her homeroom by a teacher to retrieve a forgotten purse; she never returned to class. Seven weeks later, after an intensive search, her partially mummified remains were found in a pig farrowing shed near Suwannee River State Park, 35 miles (56 km) northwest of Lake City. Forensic experts surmised that Leach had been sexually assaulted before having her throat cut and her genitals mutilated with a knife.

On February 12, with insufficient cash to pay his overdue rent and a growing suspicion that police were closing in on him, Bundy stole a car and fled Tallahassee, driving westward across the Florida Panhandle. Three days later, at around 1:00 a.m., he was stopped by Pensacola police officer David Lee near the Alabama state line after a "wants and warrants" check showed his Volkswagen Beetle was stolen. When told he was under arrest, Bundy kicked Lee's legs out from under him and took off running. Lee fired two warning shots, then gave chase and tackled him. The two struggled over Lee's gun before the officer finally subdued and arrested Bundy. In the stolen vehicle were three sets of IDs belonging to female FSU students, twenty-one stolen credit cards, and a stolen television set. Also found were a pair of dark-rimmed non-prescription glasses and a pair of plaid slacks, later identified as the disguise worn by "Richard Burton, Fire Department" in Jacksonville. As Lee transported his suspect to jail, unaware that he had just arrested one of the FBI's Ten Most Wanted Fugitives, he heard Bundy say, "I wish you had killed me."

== Subsequent trials and marriage ==
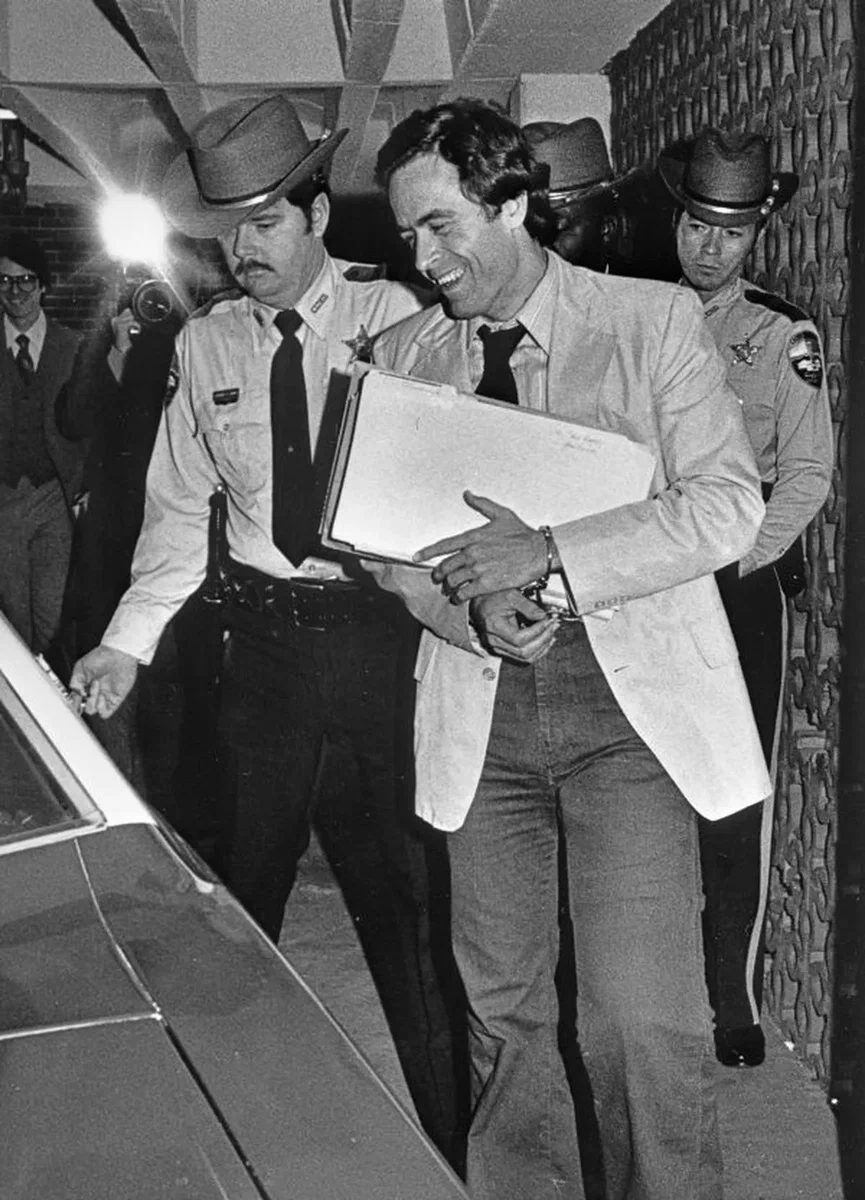
Bundy departing a preliminary hearing, Miami, 1979

In May 1978, a Florida grand jury indicted Bundy on charges of first-degree murder, attempted first-degree murder, and burglary for the Chi Omega killings and assaults. He stood trial in June 1979 in the Florida Circuit Court for Dade County, with Judge Edward Cowart presiding. The trial was covered by 250 reporters from five continents and was the first to be televised nationally in the United States. Despite the presence of five court-appointed attorneys, Bundy again handled much of his own defense. From the beginning, he "sabotaged the entire defense effort out of spite, distrust, and grandiose delusion," Nelson later wrote. "Ted [was] facing murder charges, with a possible death sentence, and all that mattered to him apparently was that he be in charge."

According to Mike Minerva, a Tallahassee public defender and member of the defense team, a pre-trial plea bargain was negotiated in which Bundy would plead guilty to killing Levy, Bowman, and Leach in exchange for a firm 75-year prison sentence. Prosecutors were amenable to a deal, by one account, because "prospects of losing at trial were very good." Bundy, on the other hand, saw the plea bargain not only as a means of avoiding the death penalty, but also as a "tactical move": he could enter his plea, then wait a few years for evidence to disintegrate or become lost, and for witnesses to die, move on, or retract their testimony. Once the case against him had deteriorated beyond repair, he could file a post-conviction motion to set aside the plea and secure an acquittal. At the last minute, however, Bundy refused the deal. "It made him realize he was going to have to stand up in front of the whole world and say he was guilty," Minerva said. "He just couldn't do it."

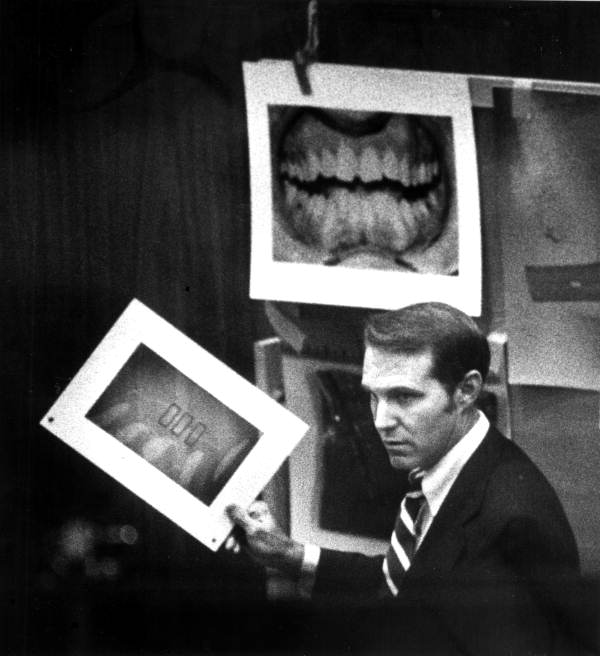
Odontologist Richard Souviron explaining bite mark evidence at the Chi Omega trial in May 1979

At trial, crucial testimony came from Chi Omega sorority members Connie Hastings, who placed Bundy in the vicinity of the sorority house that evening, and Nita Neary, who saw him leaving the house clutching the murder weapon. Incriminating physical evidence included impressions of the bite wounds Bundy had inflicted on Levy's left buttock, which forensic odontologists Richard Souviron and Lowell Levine matched to castings of Bundy's teeth. The jury was also allowed to hear details of DaRonch's previous kidnapping, and finally deliberated for less than seven hours before convicting Bundy on July 24, 1979 of the Bowman and Levy murders, three counts of attempted first-degree murder for the assaults on Kleiner, Chandler, and Thomas, and two counts of burglary. Judge Cowart imposed death sentences for the murder convictions. Bundy appealed his conviction and death sentence to the Supreme Court of Florida, but it affirmed them.

Six months later, a second trial took place in Orlando for the abduction and murder of Leach. Bundy was found guilty once again, after less than eight hours' deliberation, due principally to the testimony of an eyewitness who saw him leading Leach from the schoolyard to his stolen van. Important material evidence included clothing fibers with an unusual manufacturing error, found in the van and on Leach's body, which matched fibers from the jacket Bundy was wearing when he was arrested.

During the penalty phase of the Leach trial, Bundy took advantage of an obscure Florida law providing that a marriage declaration in court, in the presence of a judge, constituted a legal marriage. As he was questioning Boone—who had moved to Florida to be near Bundy, had testified on his behalf during both trials, and was again testifying on his behalf as a character witness—he asked her to marry him. She accepted, and Bundy declared to the court that they were legally married.

On February 10, 1980, Bundy was sentenced for a third time to death. As the sentence was announced, he reportedly stood and shouted, "Tell the jury they were wrong!" This third death sentence would be the one ultimately carried out nearly nine years later. Only Bundy's mother Louise would appear before the court to beg for mercy.

While conjugal visits were not allowed at the Florida State Prison in Raiford, where Bundy was incarcerated, inmates were known to pool their money in order to bribe guards to allow them intimate time alone with their female visitors. Boone gave birth to a daughter on October 24, 1982.

== Death row, confessions and execution ==
Shortly after the conclusion of the Leach trial and the beginning of the long appeals process that followed, Bundy initiated a series of interviews with Stephen Michaud and Hugh Aynesworth. Speaking mostly in third person to avoid "the stigma of confession", he began for the first time to divulge details of his crimes and thought processes. Bundy recounted his career as a thief, confirming Kloepfer's long-time suspicion that he had shoplifted virtually everything of substance that he owned. "The big payoff for me," he said, "was actually possessing whatever it was I had stolen. I really enjoyed having something ... that I had wanted and gone out and taken." Possession proved to be an important motive for rape and murder as well. Sexual assault, he said, fulfilled his need to "totally possess" his victims. At first, Bundy killed his victims "as a matter of expediency ... to eliminate the possibility of [being] caught"; but later, murder became part of the "adventure". "The ultimate possession was, in fact, the taking of the life," he said. "And then ... the physical possession of the remains."

Bundy also confided in Special Agent William Hagmaier of the FBI Behavioral Analysis Unit. Hagmaier was struck by the "deep, almost mystical satisfaction" that Bundy took in murder. "He said that after a while, murder is not just a crime of lust or violence," Hagmaier related. "It becomes possession. They are part of you ... [the victim] becomes a part of you, and you [two] are forever one ... and the grounds where you kill them or leave them become sacred to you, and you will always be drawn back to them." Bundy told Hagmaier that he considered himself to be an "amateur", an "impulsive" killer in his early years, before moving into what he termed his "prime" or "predator" phase at about the time of Healy's murder in 1974. This implied that he began killing well before 1974—although he never explicitly admitted having done so.

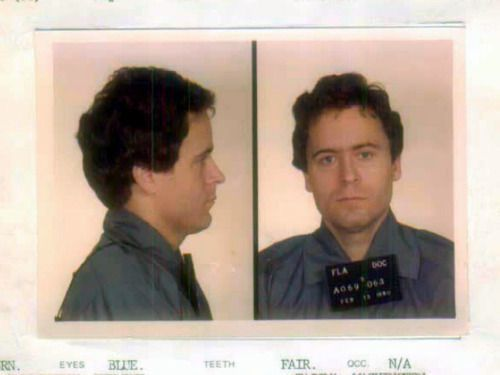
Bundy mugshot after his sentencing for the murder of Leach, February 1980

In July 1984, prison guards found two hacksaw blades hidden in Bundy's cell. A steel bar in one of the cell's windows had been sawed completely through at the top and bottom and glued back into place with a homemade soap-based adhesive. Several months later, Bundy was moved to a different cell after guards found an unauthorized mirror. Shortly thereafter, he was charged with a disciplinary infraction for unauthorized correspondence with another high-profile criminal, John Hinckley Jr.

In October 1984, Bundy contacted Keppel and offered to share his self-proclaimed expertise in serial killer psychology in the ongoing hunt in Washington for the "Green River Killer", later identified as Gary Ridgway. Keppel and Green River Task Force Detective Dave Reichert interviewed Bundy, but Ridgway remained at large for a further seventeen years. Keppel published a detailed documentation of the Green River interviews, and later collaborated with Michaud on another examination of the interview material.

In early 1986, an execution date (March 4) was set on the Chi Omega convictions; the United States Supreme Court issued a brief stay, but the execution was quickly rescheduled. In April, shortly after the new date (July 2) was announced, Bundy finally confessed to Hagmaier and Nelson what they believed was the full range of his depredations, including details of what he did to some of his victims after their deaths. He told them that he revisited Taylor Mountain, Issaquah and other secondary crime scenes, often several times, to lie with his victims and perform sex acts with their bodies until putrefaction forced him to stop. In some cases, he drove for several hours each way and remained the entire night. In Utah, he applied makeup to Smith's lifeless face and repeatedly washed Aime's hair. "If you've got time," he told Hagmaier, "they can be anything you want them to be." Bundy decapitated approximately twelve of his victims with a hacksaw, and kept at least one group of severed heads—probably the four later found on Taylor Mountain (Rancourt, Parks, Ball and Healy)—in his apartment for a period of time before disposing of them.

Less than fifteen hours before the scheduled July 2 execution, the U.S. Court of Appeals for the Eleventh Circuit stayed it indefinitely and remanded the Chi Omega case back to the Southern District of Florida due to legal issues, including Bundy's mental competency to stand trial and an erroneous instruction by Judge Cowart during the penalty phase requiring the jury to break a 6–6 tie between life imprisonment and the death penalty—which, ultimately, were never resolved. A new date (November 18) was then set to carry out the Leach sentence; the Eleventh Circuit Court issued a stay on November 17. In mid-1988, the Eleventh Circuit ruled against Bundy, and in December the Supreme Court denied a motion to review the ruling over the dissents of Justices Thurgood Marshall and William J. Brennan Jr. Within hours of that final denial, a firm execution date of January 24, 1989, was announced. Bundy's journey through the appeals courts had been unusually rapid for a capital murder case: "Contrary to popular belief, the courts moved Bundy as fast as they could ... Even the prosecutors acknowledged that Bundy's lawyers never employed delaying tactics. Though people everywhere seethed at the apparent delay in executing the archdemon, Ted Bundy was actually on the fast track."

With all appeal avenues exhausted and no further motivation to deny his crimes, Bundy agreed to speak frankly with investigators. He confessed to Keppel that he had committed all eight of the Washington and Oregon homicides for which he was the prime suspect. He described three additional previously unknown victims in Washington and two in Oregon whom he declined to identify if indeed he ever knew their identities. He said he left a fifth corpse—Manson's—on Taylor Mountain, but incinerated her skull in Kloepfer's fireplace. "He described the Issaquah crime scene [where the bones of Ott, Naslund and Hawkins were found], and it was almost like he was just there," Keppel said. "Like he was seeing everything. He was infatuated with the idea because he spent so much time there. He is just totally consumed with murder all the time." Nelson's impressions were similar: "It was the absolute misogyny of his crimes that stunned me," she wrote, "his manifest rage against women. He had no compassion at all ... he was totally engrossed in the details. His murders were his life's accomplishments."

Bundy confessed to detectives from Idaho, Utah and Colorado that he had committed numerous additional homicides, including several that were unknown to police. He explained that when he was in Utah he could bring his victims back to his apartment, "where he could reenact scenarios depicted on the covers of detective magazines." A new ulterior strategy quickly became apparent: he withheld many details, hoping to parlay the incomplete information into yet another stay of execution. Despite warnings from his appellate attorneys that "the spectacle of peddling information for time would turn the courts against [Bundy]", he began offering investigators piecemeal information regarding some of his murders. "There are other buried remains in Colorado," Bundy admitted, but he refused to elaborate. The new strategy—immediately dubbed "Ted's bones-for-time scheme"—served only to deepen the resolve of authorities to see Bundy executed on schedule and yielded little new detailed information. In cases where he did give details, nothing was found. Colorado Detective Matt Lindvall interpreted this as a conflict between his desire to postpone his execution by divulging information and his need to remain in "total possession—the only person who knew his victims' true resting places."

When it became clear that no further stays would be forthcoming from the courts, Bundy supporters began lobbying for the only remaining option, executive clemency. Diana Weiner, a young Florida attorney and Bundy's last purported love interest, asked the families of several Colorado and Utah victims to petition Florida Governor Bob Martinez for a postponement to give Bundy time to reveal more information. All refused. "The families already believed that the victims were dead and that Ted had killed them," wrote Nelson. "They didn't need his confession." Martinez made it clear that he would not agree to further delays in any case. "We are not going to have the system manipulated," he told reporters. "For him to be negotiating for his life over the bodies of victims is despicable."

On the afternoon before he was executed, Bundy granted a videotaped interview to James Dobson, a psychologist and founder of the conservative evangelical Christian organization Focus on the Family. He used the opportunity to make new claims about violence in the media and the pornographic "roots" of his crimes. "It happened in stages, gradually," he said. "My experience with ... pornography that deals on a violent level with sexuality, is once you become addicted to it ... I would keep looking for more potent, more explicit, more graphic kinds of material. Until you reach a point where the pornography only goes so far ..." Violence in the media, he said, "particularly sexualized violence," sent boys "down the road to being Ted Bundys." The FBI, he suggested, should stake out adult movie houses and follow patrons as they leave. "You are going to kill me," he said, "and that will protect society from me. But out there are many, many more people who are addicted to pornography, and you are doing nothing about that."

While Nelson was apparently convinced that Bundy's concern was genuine, most biographers, researchers, and other observers have concluded that his sudden condemnation of pornography was one last manipulative attempt to shift blame by catering to Dobson's agenda as a longtime pornography critic. He told Dobson that "true crime" detective magazines had "corrupted" him and "fueled [his] fantasies ... to the point of becoming a serial killer"; yet in a 1977 letter to Rule, he wrote, "Who in the world reads these publications? ... I have never purchased such a magazine, and [on only] two or three occasions have I ever picked one up." He told Michaud and Aynsworth in 1980, and Hagmaier the night before he spoke to Dobson, that pornography played a negligible role in his development as a serial killer. "The problem wasn't pornography," wrote Dekle. "The problem was Bundy." "I wish I could believe that his motives were altruistic," wrote Rule. "But all I can see in that Dobson tape is another Ted Bundy manipulation of our minds. The effect of the tape is to place, once again, the onus of his crimes, not on himself, but on us."

Boone had championed Bundy's innocence throughout all of his trials and felt "deeply betrayed" by his admission that he was, in fact, guilty. She moved back to Washington with her daughter and refused to accept his phone call on the morning of his execution. "She was hurt by his relationship with Diana [Weiner]," Nelson wrote, "and devastated by his sudden wholesale confessions in his last days." Hagmaier was present during Bundy's final interviews with investigators. On the eve of his execution, he talked of suicide. "He did not want to give the state the satisfaction of watching him die," Hagmaier said.

Bundy declined to order a special last meal, so a few hours before his execution he was given the traditional Florida Department of Corrections last meal of beef steak (medium-rare), fried eggs (over easy), hash browns, toasted bread, milk, coffee, juice, butter, and jelly, although he did not eat it. Bundy was executed in the electric chair at Florida State Prison in Raiford at 7:06 a.m. EST on January 24, 1989, at age 42. He was pronounced dead at 7:16 am. His last words were addressed to his attorney, Jim Coleman, and to Methodist minister Fred Lawrence: "Jim and Fred, I'd like you to give my love to my family and friends." Earlier that morning, he was permitted two telephone calls to his mother, during which he apologized, saying, "I'm so sorry I've given you all such grief, but a part of me was hidden all the time." Several hundred people gathered in a pasture across from the prison, where they sang, danced and set off fireworks as the execution was carried out, and they cheered when the white hearse transporting Bundy's body left the facility. He was cremated in Gainesville. His will stated that his ashes were to be scattered in the Cascade Range in Washington.

== Modus operandi and victim profiles ==
Bundy was an unusually organized and calculating criminal who used his extensive knowledge of law enforcement methodologies to elude identification and capture for years. His crime scenes were distributed over large geographic areas; his victim count had risen to at least twenty before it became clear that numerous investigators in widely disparate jurisdictions were hunting the same man. Bundy's assault methods of choice were blunt trauma and strangulation, two relatively silent techniques that could be accomplished with common household items. He deliberately avoided firearms due to the noise they made and the ballistic evidence they left behind. He was a "meticulous researcher" who explored his surroundings in minute detail, looking for safe sites to seize and dispose of victims. He was unusually skilled at minimizing physical evidence. Bundy's fingerprints were never found at a crime scene, nor any other incontrovertible evidence of his guilt, a fact he repeated often during the years in which he attempted to maintain his innocence.

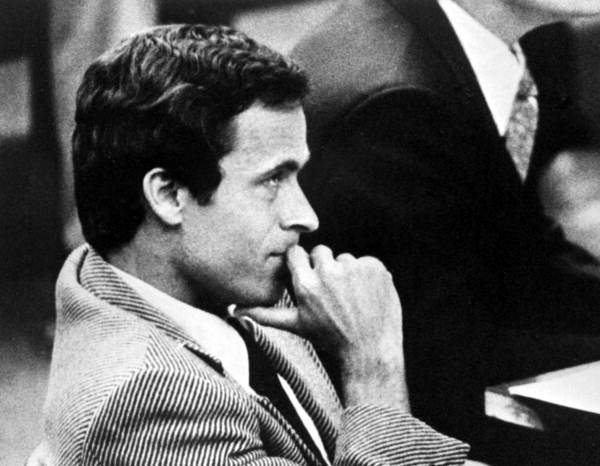
Bundy in a Miami courtroom in 1979

Other significant obstacles for law enforcement were Bundy's generic, essentially anonymous physical features, and a curious chameleon-like ability to change his appearance. Early on, police complained of the futility of showing his photograph to witnesses; he looked different in virtually every photo ever taken of him. In person, "his expression would so change his whole appearance that there were moments that you weren't even sure you were looking at the same person," said Stewart Hanson Jr., the judge in the DaRonch trial. "He [was] really a changeling." Bundy was well aware of this unusual quality and he exploited it, using subtle modifications of facial hair or hairstyle to significantly alter his appearance as necessary. He concealed his one distinctive identifying mark, a dark mole on his neck, with turtleneck shirts and sweaters. Even his Volkswagen Beetle proved difficult to pin down; its color was variously described by witnesses as metallic or non-metallic, tan or bronze, light brown or dark brown.

Bundy's modus operandi evolved in organization and sophistication over time, as is typical of serial killers, according to FBI experts. Early on, it consisted of forcible late-night entry followed by a violent attack with a blunt weapon on a sleeping victim. As his methodology evolved, he became progressively more organized in his choice of victims and crime scenes. He would employ various ruses designed to lure his victim to the vicinity of his vehicle where he had pre-positioned a weapon, usually a crowbar. In many cases he wore a plaster cast on one leg or a sling on one arm, and sometimes hobbled on crutches, then requested assistance in carrying something to his vehicle. Bundy was regarded as handsome and charismatic, traits he exploited to win the confidence of his victims and the people around him in his daily life. "Ted lured females," Michaud wrote, "the way a lifeless silk flower can dupe a honey bee." He would sometimes approach women pretending to be an authority figure or firefighter.

Once Bundy had victims near or inside his vehicle, he would overpower and bludgeon them, and then restrain them with handcuffs. He would then transport them to a pre-selected secondary site, often a considerable distance away, and rape them during ligature strangulation. In the case of his Utah victims, the secondary site would be his apartment building. Toward the end of his spree, in Florida, perhaps under the stress of being a fugitive, he regressed to indiscriminate attacks on sleeping women. While he is often said to have been a torturer, and biographer Ann Rule in particular regarded him as a "sadistic sociopath" who took pleasure in human suffering, Bundy disputed these claims in one of his conversations with Michaud, insisting that he never deliberately tortured any of those he killed and that the murders had no sadistic focus on enjoyment derived from the infliction of pain and injury. To the contrary, he claimed that he went out of his way to mitigate his victims' physical torment. Though he also told Hagmaier that he would pose his victims to recreate detective magazine covers.

At secondary sites Bundy would remove and later burn the victim's clothing, or in at least one case (Cunningham's) deposit them in a Goodwill Industries collection bin. He explained that the clothing removal was ritualistic, but also a practical matter, as it minimized the chance of leaving trace evidence at the crime scene that could implicate him. A manufacturing error in fibers from his own clothing, ironically, provided a crucial incriminating link to the Leach killing. He often revisited his secondary crime scenes to engage in acts of necrophilia, and to groom or dress up the cadavers. Some victims were found wearing articles of clothing they had never worn, or nail polish that family members had never seen. Bundy took Polaroid photos of many of his victims. "When you work hard to do something right," he told Hagmaier, "you don't want to forget it." Consumption of large quantities of alcohol was an "essential component", he told both Keppel and Michaud; he needed to be "extremely drunk" while on the prowl in order to "significantly diminish" his inhibitions and to "sedate" the "dominant personality" that he feared might prevent his inner "entity" from acting on his impulses.

All of Bundy's known victims were white females, most of middle-class backgrounds. Almost all were between the ages of 15 and 25 and most were college students. He apparently never approached anyone he might have met before. In their last conversation before his execution, Bundy told Kloepfer he had purposely stayed away from her "when he felt the power of his sickness building in him." Bundy's younger brother Richard recalled Ted abruptly sending him away during a visit, speculating in retrospect that his homicidal urges were rising at that moment. Rule noted that most of the identified victims had long straight hair, parted in the middle—like Edwards, the woman who rejected him, and to whom he later became engaged and then rejected in return. Rule speculated that Bundy's animosity toward his first girlfriend triggered his protracted rampage and caused him to target victims who resembled her. Bundy dismissed this hypothesis: "[T]hey ... just fit the general criteria of being young and attractive," he told Aynesworth. "Too many people have bought this crap that all the girls were similar ... [but] almost everything was dissimilar ... physically, they were almost all different." He did concede that youth and beauty were "absolutely indispensable criteria" in his choice of victims.

After Bundy's execution, Rule was surprised and troubled to hear from numerous "sensitive, intelligent, kind young women" who wrote or called to say they were deeply depressed because Bundy was dead. Many had corresponded with him, "each believing that she was his only one." Several said they suffered nervous breakdowns when he died. "Even in death, Ted damaged women," Rule wrote. "To get well, they must realize that they were conned by the master con-man. They are grieving for a shadow man that never existed."

== Pathology ==
Bundy underwent multiple psychiatric examinations; the experts' conclusions varied. Lewis, a professor of psychiatry at the New York University School of Medicine and an authority on violent behavior, initially made a diagnosis of bipolar disorder, but later changed her impression more than once. She also suggested the possibility of a multiple personality disorder, based on behaviors described in interviews and court testimony; a great-aunt witnessed an episode during which Bundy "seemed to turn into another, unrecognizable person ... [she] suddenly, inexplicably found herself afraid of her favorite nephew as they waited together at a dusk-darkened train station. He had turned into a stranger." Lewis recounted a prison official in Tallahassee describing a similar transformation: "He said, 'He became weird on me.' He did a metamorphosis, a body and facial change, and he felt there was almost an odor emitting from him. He said, 'Almost a complete change of personality ... that was the day I was afraid of him.'"

While experts found Bundy's precise diagnosis elusive, the majority of evidence pointed away from bipolar disorder or psychosis, and toward antisocial personality disorder (ASPD). Bundy displayed many personality traits typically found in ASPD patients, such as outward charm and charisma with little true personality or genuine insight beneath the facade; the ability to distinguish right from wrong, but with minimal effect on behavior; and an absence of guilt or remorse. "Guilt doesn't solve anything, really," Bundy said in 1981. "It hurts you ... I guess I am in the enviable position of not having to deal with guilt." There was also evidence of narcissism, poor judgment and manipulative behavior. Upon assessment using the Psychopathy Checklist–revised (PCL-R), Bundy was reportedly evaluated as 39/40. Prosecutor George Dekle wrote, "Sociopaths are egotistical manipulators who think they can con anybody." "Sometimes he manipulates even me," admitted one psychiatrist. In the end, Lewis agreed with the majority: "I always tell my graduate students that if they can find me a real, true psychopath, I'll buy them dinner," she told Nelson. "I never thought they existed ... but I think Ted may have been one, a true psychopath, without any remorse or empathy at all." Narcissistic personality disorder (NPD) and its subtype malignant narcissism have both been proposed as alternative diagnoses in at least one subsequent retrospective analysis.

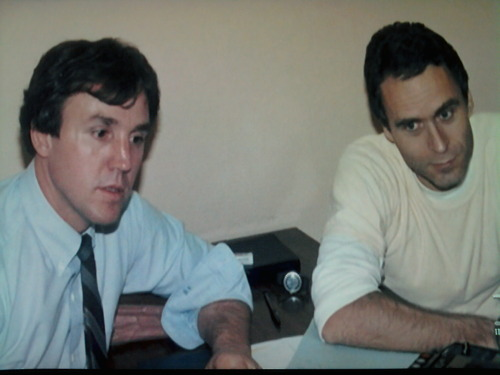
Hagmaier and Bundy during their final death row interview on the eve of Bundy's execution, January 23, 1989

Rule and Aynesworth both noted that for Bundy, the fault always lay with someone or something else. While he eventually confessed to thirty murders, he never accepted responsibility for any of them, even when offered that opportunity prior to the Chi Omega trial, which would have spared him the death penalty. In interviews, he would talk about the absence of his biological father, the concealment of his true parentage by his mother, alcohol, the media, the police (whom he accused of planting evidence), society in general, and violence on television. In third person, he said, "this person was reacting inappropriately to stress from his own environment" such as sense of self-esteem, fulfillment, life failures and anxieties. He blamed television programming, which he watched mostly on sets that he had stolen, for "brainwashing" him into stealing credit cards. Another significant element permeated Bundy's thinking:

Bundy was always surprised when anyone noticed that one of his victims was missing, because he imagined America to be a place where everyone is invisible except to themselves. And he was always astounded when people testified that they had seen him in incriminating places, because Bundy did not believe people noticed each other.

"I don't know why everyone is out to get me," Bundy complained to Lewis. "He really and truly did not have any sense of the enormity of what he had done," she said. "A long-term serial killer erects powerful barriers to his guilt," Keppel wrote, "walls of denial that can sometimes never be breached." Nelson agreed. "Each time he was forced to make an actual confession," she wrote, "he had to leap a steep barrier he had built inside himself long ago."

== Victims ==
Ted Bundy murder and attack locations
Approximate locations of murders and attacks attributed to Ted Bundy (red = confirmed, blue = suspected)
1 Lynda Ann Healy – Seattle, Washington
2 Donna Gail Manson – Olympia, Washington
3 Susan Elaine Rancourt – Ellensburg, Washington
4 Roberta Kathleen Parks – Corvallis, Oregon
5 Brenda Carol Ball – Burien, Washington
6 Georgann Hawkins – Seattle, Washington
7 Janice Ann Ott – Issaquah, Washington
8 Denise Marie Naslund – Issaquah, Washington
9 Nancy Wilcox – Holladay, Utah
10 Melissa Anne Smith – Midvale, Utah
11 Laura Ann Aime – Lehi, Utah
12 Carol DaRonch – Murray, Utah
13 Debra Jean Kent – Bountiful, Utah
14 Caryn Eileen Campbell – Snowmass Village, Colorado
15 Julie Lyle Cunningham – Vail, Colorado
16 Denise Lynn Oliverson – Grand Junction, Colorado
17 Lynette Dawn Culver – Pocatello, Idaho
18 Susan Curtis – Provo, Utah
19 Margaret Elizabeth Bowman – Tallahassee, Florida
20 Lisa Janet Levy – Tallahassee, Florida
21 Karen Chandler – Tallahassee, Florida
22 Kathy Kleiner – Tallahassee, Florida
23 Cheryl Thomas – Tallahassee, Florida
24 Kimberly Dianne Leach – Lake City, Florida
25 Ann Marie Burr – Tacoma, Washington (suspected)
26 Lisa Wick and Lonnie Ree Trumbull – Seattle, Washington (suspected)
27 Susan Margarite Davis and Elizabeth Potter Perry – Somers Point, New Jersey (suspected)
28 Joyce Margaret LePage – Pullman, Washington (suspected)
29 Santa Rosa hitchhiker murders – Santa Rosa, California (suspected)
30 Kerry May-Hardy – Seattle, Washington (suspected)
31 Vicki Lynn Hollar – Eugene, Oregon (suspected)
32 Suzanne Rae Justis – Portland, Oregon (suspected)
33 Rita Lorraine Jolly – West Linn, Oregon (suspected)
34 Brenda Joy Baker – Puyallup, Washington (suspected)
35 Sandra Jean Weaver – Tooele/Salt Lake City, Utah (suspected)
36 Rhonda Stapley – Salt Lake City, Utah (suspected)
37 Melanie Suzanne Cooley – Nederland, Colorado (suspected)
38 Shelley Kay Robertson – Golden, Colorado (suspected)
39 Nancy Perry Baird – Layton, Utah (suspected)
40 Deborah Diane Smith – Salt Lake City, Utah (suspected)
41 Joy Kathleen Harmon – Salt Lake City, Utah (suspected)

=== Confirmed ===
The night before his execution, Bundy confessed to thirty homicides, but the true total remains unknown and Bundy occasionally made cryptic comments to encourage speculation. He told Aynesworth in 1980 that for every murder "publicized", there "could be one that was not." When FBI agents proposed a total tally of thirty-six, Bundy responded, "Add one digit to that, and you'll have it." Bundy told Aynesworth that he thought nodding to a proposed three digits was "outrageous enough." Years later he told Nelson that the common estimate of thirty-five was accurate, but Keppel wrote that "[Ted] and I both knew [the total] was much higher." Keppel later stated his belief that Bundy had killed "at least 50, and maybe 75."

John Henry Browne, a lawyer for Bundy, would later claim "that the first person he killed was a young boy when they were playing some kind of sex game in the woods. And so he must have been only 12, 13, 14." Browne also said that "Ted told me in that interview that he killed over 100 people." "I told Ted Bundy that we now have the evidence to charge him with both cases," Leon County Sheriff Kenneth Katsaris recalled, referring to the Chi Omega murders and the slaying of Leach. "He looked at me and said, 'When you find the person that committed these crimes that you think I committed, that person is going to be wanted for murders of women in the three digits in six states.'" "I don't think even he knew ... how many he killed, or why he killed them," said Reverend Fred Lawrence, the Methodist clergyman who administered Bundy's last rites. "That was my impression, my strong impression."

On the evening before his execution, Bundy reviewed his victim tally with Hagmaier on a state-by-state basis for a total of 30 homicides:

- in Washington, 11 (including Parks, abducted in Oregon but killed in Washington; and including 3 unidentified)
- in Utah, 8 (3 unidentified)
- in Colorado, 3
- in Florida, 3
- in Oregon, 2 (both unidentified)
- in Idaho, 2 (1 unidentified)
- in California, 1 (unidentified)

=== 1974 ===
==== Washington, Oregon ====
- January 4: Karen Sparks (18) – Bludgeoned and sexually assaulted in her bed as she slept in the University District of Seattle; survived but the extent of her injuries resulted in permanent brain damage.
- February 1: Lynda Ann Healy (21) – Bludgeoned while asleep and abducted from her basement apartment in Seattle and was then decapitated and dismembered post-mortem; mandible recovered at Taylor Mountain site in 1975.
- March 12: Donna Gail Manson (19) – Abducted while walking to a concert at Evergreen State College; body left according to Bundy at Taylor Mountain site, but never found. However, there is speculation that the partial remains of an unidentified female discovered near Eatonville, Washington, on August 29, 1978, could have belonged to Manson. Remains and clothing were reportedly destroyed on May 10, 1985, before a positive forensic identification could be made.
- April 17: Susan Elaine Rancourt (18) – Disappeared after attending an evening advisors' meeting at Central Washington State College; skull and mandible recovered at Taylor Mountain site in 1975. Both had been severely fractured.
- May 6: Roberta Kathleen Parks (22) – Vanished from Oregon State University in Corvallis, Oregon; skull and mandible recovered at Taylor Mountain site in 1975. She had been bludgeoned to death.
- June 1: Brenda Carol Ball (22) – Disappeared after leaving the Flame Tavern in Burien, and was last seen in the parking lot, talking to a man with his arm in a sling; skull and mandible recovered at Taylor Mountain site in 1975. Her skull had been fractured.
- June 11: Georgann Hawkins (18) – Abducted from an alley behind her sorority house; skeletal remains identified by Bundy as those of Hawkins recovered at Issaquah site. Hawkins remains listed as a missing person.

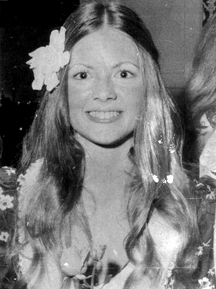
Georgann Hawkins

- July 14: Janice Ann Ott (23) – Abducted from Lake Sammamish State Park in broad daylight and was last seen leaving the park with Bundy, who had asked her for assistance with putting his sailboat on his car; skeletal remains recovered at Issaquah site in 1974.
- July 14: Denise Marie Naslund (19) – Abducted four hours after Ott from Lake Sammamish State Park and was last seen walking towards the restrooms; skeletal remains recovered at Issaquah site in 1974.

==== Utah ====
- October 1: Nancy Wilcox (16) – Last seen leaving her home at 9:00 pm in Holladay, Utah, after getting into an argument with her father; body buried according to Bundy near Capitol Reef National Park, 200 miles (320 km) south of Salt Lake City, but never found.
- October 18: Melissa Anne Smith (17) – Vanished from Midvale, Utah, after leaving a pizza parlor to walk back to her home; body found nine days later on a hillside in Summit Park, Utah. Her head had been severely beaten with a crowbar, and her body had been battered before death.
- October 31: Laura Ann Aime (17) – Disappeared from Lehi, Utah, on her way home from a Halloween party; body discovered by hikers in American Fork Canyon. Her face was beaten beyond recognition, and she had been strangled and sexually assaulted.
- November 8: Carol DaRonch (18) – Picked up from the Fashion Place shopping mall in Murray, Utah, lured by Bundy's guise of claiming to be a police officer investigating vehicle break-ins in the parking lot; she escaped by jumping out of Bundy's vehicle after he inadvertently fastened a pair of handcuffs on the same wrist.
- November 8: Debra Jean Kent (17) – Vanished after leaving a school play in Bountiful, Utah; body left according to Bundy near Fairview, 100 miles (160 km) south of Bountiful; one patella was subsequently found at this location in 1989, and it was positively identified by DNA as Kent's in 2015.

=== 1975 ===
==== Utah, Colorado, Idaho ====
- January 12: Caryn Eileen Campbell (23) – Disappeared from a hotel hallway in Snowmass Village, Colorado; body discovered on a dirt road near the hotel with skull fractures and knife wounds on February 17.
- March 15: Julie Lyle Cunningham (26) – Disappeared from Vail, Colorado, after she left her apartment in the Apollo Park neighborhood to visit a local tavern; body buried according to Bundy near Rifle, 90 miles (140 km) west of Vail, but never found.
- April 6: Denise Lynn Oliverson (24) – Abducted while cycling to her parents' house in Grand Junction, Colorado; body thrown according to Bundy into the Colorado River 5 miles (8.0 km) west of Grand Junction, but never found.
- May 6: Lynette Dawn Culver (12) – Abducted from Pocatello, Idaho, after she left Alameda Junior High School for her lunch break; body thrown according to Bundy into what authorities believe to be the Snake River, but never found.
- June 28: Susan Curtis (15) – Disappeared during a youth conference at Brigham Young University when she left her friends to walk back to her dormitory and brush her teeth; body buried according to Bundy along a highway near Price, 75 miles (121 km) southeast of Provo, but never found.

=== 1978 ===
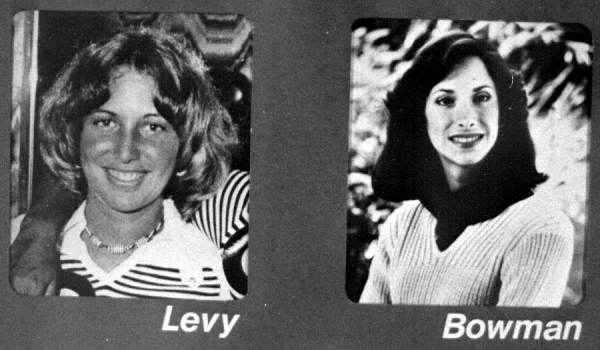
Lisa Levy and Margaret Bowman

==== Florida ====
===== FSU =====
- January 15: Margaret Elizabeth Bowman (21) – Bludgeoned and strangled as she slept at the Chi Omega sorority at Florida State University (no secondary crime scene).
- January 15: Lisa Janet Levy (20) – Bludgeoned, strangled, bitten and sexually assaulted as she slept at the Chi Omega sorority at Florida State University (no secondary crime scene).
- January 15: Karen Chandler (21) – Bludgeoned as she slept at the Chi Omega sorority; survived, although her skull was fractured, and her jaw, right arm and fingers were crushed.
- January 15: Kathy Kleiner (21) – Bludgeoned as she slept at the Chi Omega sorority, resulting in her jaw being shattered and her right cheek being ripped open; survived.
- January 15: Cheryl Thomas (21) – Bludgeoned as she slept, eight blocks from Chi Omega; survived after having a fractured jaw and skull which left her with permanent deafness in her left ear and equilibrium damage.

===== Elsewhere =====
- February 9: Kimberly Dianne Leach (12) – Abducted from Lake City Junior High School in Lake City, Florida, and was last seen being led to a white van by a man who was later identified as Bundy; mummified remains found near Suwannee River State Park, 43 miles (69 km) west of Lake City, with "homicidal violence about the neck region."

=== Unconfirmed murders ===
Bundy remains a suspect in several unsolved homicides and disappearances, and is likely responsible for others that may never be identified; in 1987, he confided to Keppel that there were "some murders" that he would "never talk about", because they were committed "too close to home", "too close to family" or involved "victims who were very young." Minutes before his execution, Hagmaier queried Bundy about unsolved homicides in Florida, Vermont, Illinois, New Jersey and Texas. Bundy provided directions—later proven inaccurate—to Curtis' burial site in Utah, but denied involvement in any of the open cases. In 2011, Bundy's complete DNA profile, obtained from a vial of his blood found in an evidence vault, was added to the FBI's DNA database for future reference in these and other unsolved murder cases:

- Ann Marie Burr, aged 8, vanished from her Tacoma residence on August 31, 1961, when Bundy was aged 14. An unknown tennis shoe imprint was found by the overturned bench used to enter her house. Due to the small size of the shoe, police believed the perpetrator was a teenager or youth. The Burr house was on Bundy's newspaper delivery route and Burr's father was certain that he saw Bundy in a ditch at a construction site on the nearby UPS campus the morning his daughter disappeared. Other circumstantial evidence implicates Bundy as well, but detectives familiar with the case have never agreed on the likelihood of his involvement. Bundy repeatedly denied culpability and wrote a letter of denial to the Burr family in 1986. However, Keppel has observed that the Burr case fits all three categories of murders Bundy would "never talk about": "too close to home", "too close to family" and "very young." Forensic testing of material evidence from the Burr crime scene in 2011 yielded insufficient intact DNA sequences for comparison with Bundy's, and as such his involvement remains speculative.
- Flight attendants Lisa Wick and Lonnie Ree Trumbull, both 20, were bludgeoned with a piece of lumber as they slept in their basement apartment in Seattle's Queen Anne neighborhood in the early morning hours of June 23, 1966. An autopsy concluded that Trumbull had died at approximately midnight from a blow to the head she had received about an hour earlier. In retrospect, Keppel noted many similarities to the Chi Omega crime scene. The crime was also similarly comparable to Bundy's earlier verifiable assaults on women, who were bludgeoned while in their beds in Seattle basement apartments. Wick, who suffered permanent memory loss as a result of the attack, later contacted Rule: "I know that it was Ted Bundy who did that to us," she wrote, "but I can't tell you how I know." Police records state that when Bundy's fingerprints were compared in January 1977 to those left at the crime scene, they did not match, although many people were allowed into the unsecured crime scene and may have left their fingerprints, thereby causing unwanted alteration of evidence. Bundy's involvement remains unconfirmed.
- Vacationing Pennsylvania college friends Susan Margarite Davis and Elizabeth Potter Perry, both 19, were stabbed to death in Somers Point, New Jersey, on May 30, 1969. The women had been visiting Ocean City and were on their way back to Pennsylvania at about 4:30 a.m. before they stopped at the Somers Point Diner for breakfast. They left the diner one hour later and vanished. Their car was found that day abandoned beside the Garden State Parkway near Atlantic City, 60 miles (97 km) southeast of Philadelphia; their bodies were discovered in nearby woods three days later tied to trees with their hair. Davis was naked with her clothing and accessories in a pile beside her. Except for her missing underwear, Perry was fully-dressed. Bundy attended Temple University from January through May 1969 and apparently did not move west until after Memorial Day weekend. While his accounts of his earliest crimes varied considerably between interviews, he told forensic psychologist Art Norman that his first murder victims were two women in the Philadelphia area. Biographer Richard Larsen believed that Bundy committed the murders using his feigned-injury ruse, based on an investigator's interview with Bundy's aunt: Ted, she said, was wearing a leg cast due to an automobile accident on the weekend of the homicides, and therefore could not have traveled from Philadelphia to the Jersey Shore; there is no official record of any such accident. Bundy is considered a "strong suspect" but the case remains open.
- Joyce Margaret LePage, aged 21, was last seen on the evening of July 22, 1971, when friends dropped her off at her apartment on the campus of Washington State University (WSU), where she was an undergraduate. Later, her vehicle was discovered by police parked four blocks from her residence. Nine months later, LePage's skeletal remains were found wrapped in two "military" blankets, bound with rope, in a deep ravine south of Pullman, Washington. Her remains were also covered with a sizable piece of green shag carpet that had been previously reported missing from Stevens Hall, a women's residence on the WSU campus, which was vacant and undergoing renovations in the summer of 1971. The cause of her death was confirmed to be three knife wounds to her chest, which was determined during an FBI forensic examination of her bones. Police concluded from available evidence that she had been stabbed to death in Stevens Hall before being wrapped in carpet and taken to the ravine. Whitman County authorities have said that multiple suspects—including Bundy—have "never been cleared."
- The Santa Rosa hitchhiker murders were a series of at least seven unsolved homicides and unsolved disappearances all involving young female hitchhikers occurring within Santa Rosa and throughout Sonoma County, in the North Bay area of California, between 1972 and 1973. Some investigators ruled out Bundy as a suspect due to credit card receipts locating him in Washington State around the time of the homicides. Homicide detective Robert D. Keppel suggested that this could not rule out Bundy, who was known to drive hundreds of miles to commit a murder and confessed to having murdered in California. Other suspects include serial killer Joseph Naso, the "Hillside Stranglers" Kenneth Bianchi and Angelo Buono Jr., and the unidentified Zodiac Killer.
- Kerry May-Hardy, aged 22, disappeared whilst hitchhiking on June 13, 1972, from Woodland Park, Seattle. Hardy's skeletal remains were unearthed on September 6, 2010, by construction machinery, in a grave measuring two feet (0.6 meters) in depth. DNA from the skeleton matched the family's sample on June 1, 2011. Hardy's body was discovered eighty miles southeast of Seattle, near Cle Elum, Washington; she is known to have shared a mutual acquaintance with Bundy, although it is uncertain if they actually knew each other. The case remains unsolved.
- In 1989, Bundy confessed to two homicides in Oregon without identifying the victims. Oregon law enforcement subsequently identified Bundy as a prime suspect in the 1973 disappearances of Vicki Lynn Hollar, aged 24, who disappeared from Eugene on August 20, and Suzanne Rae Justis, aged 23, who was last seen in Portland on November 5. Hollar was last seen getting into her car at a parking lot en route to her apartment. Justis was last heard from when she telephoned her parents from outside the Veterans Memorial Coliseum. Bundy was linked to the cases due to the fact that Hollar and Justis both fitted his preferred victim profile and he was known to have been in the area at the time they disappeared. Another possible victim identified by detectives was 17-year-old Rita Lorraine Jolly, who disappeared from West Linn on June 29, 1973, after leaving her residence on Horton Road to go for a walk. Jolly was last seen between 8:30 and 9:00 p.m., walking uphill on Sunset Avenue. Authorities were unable to obtain an interview with Bundy and all three women remain classified as missing.
- Brenda Joy Baker, aged 14, was last seen hitchhiking near Puyallup, Washington, on May 27, 1974; her body was found in Millersylvania State Park a month later. Her throat had been slit. Though Bundy was widely believed responsible for both her murder and that of Katherine Devine (see below), he told Keppel that he had no knowledge of either case. The Baker homicide remains unsolved, although William Cosden, the man ultimately convicted in Devine's murder, is also considered the prime suspect in her case.
- Sandra Jean Weaver, aged 19, a Wisconsin native who had been living in Tooele, Utah, was last seen leaving the Warehouse District in Salt Lake City for her lunch break at around 10:30 a.m. on July 1, 1974. Her nude body was discovered the following day by tourists hiking in De Beque by the Colorado River near Grand Junction, Colorado. She had been sexually assaulted and strangled to death before being dumped off a service road. Salt Lake County Sheriff's Detective Jerry Thompson later stated that Weaver's case was "very similar" to the subsequent deaths of Smith and Aime. However, Weaver's murder officially remains unsolved.
- Melanie Suzanne Cooley, aged 18, disappeared on April 15, 1975, after leaving Nederland High School in Nederland, Colorado, 50 miles (80 km) northwest of Denver. She was last seen by classmates hitchhiking nearby after her classes were over. Her corpse was discovered by road workers two weeks later in Coal Creek Canyon, 20 miles (32 km) away from where she was last seen. Gas station receipts place Bundy in nearby Golden on the day Cooley disappeared. Jefferson County authorities consider the evidence in Cooley's case to be inconclusive and continue to treat her homicide as a cold case.
- Shelley Kay Robertson, aged 24, failed to show up for work in Golden on July 1, 1975. Her nude, decomposed body was found by two mining students on August 21, 500 feet (150 m) inside a mine on Berthoud Pass near Winter Park Resort. Credit card receipts placed Bundy in Golden on the day of Robertson's disappearance, but there is no direct evidence of his involvement.
- Nancy Perry Baird, aged 23, disappeared from the gas station where she worked as a service attendant in Layton, Utah, 25 miles (40 km) north of Salt Lake City, on July 4, 1975, and remains classified as a missing person. A police officer on patrol saw her working alone there, and at 5:30 p.m., less than fifteen minutes later, she was discovered missing. Bundy admitted to eight Utah homicides shortly before his execution and authorities suspected that one of the unidentified victims could have been Baird. However, her suspected kidnapping did not fit the profile of Bundy's past crimes in a number of respects, and he explicitly denied involvement during the interviews he gave on death row. In 2023, archival researcher Tiffany Jean and Salt Lake City station KSL-TV uncovered documentary evidence showing that Bundy had attended a family function with Knudson in Fruitland, Utah, over one hundred miles from Layton, on the date of Baird's disappearance.
- Deborah Diane Smith, aged 17, was last seen in Salt Lake City in early February 1976, shortly before the DaRonch trial began; her body was found by a utility worker in an open pasture near Salt Lake City International Airport on April 1, 1976. Salt Lake Detective Jim Bell suspected that Bundy may have killed Smith. "We're still in limbo on the Debbie Smith one," he said. "We're going to wait for a time chart. We haven't come up with anything on Bundy, but we haven't ruled anything out, either."
- Joy Kathleen Harmon, aged 22, was last seen exiting the Better Days Bar in Salt Lake City on the evening of March 2, 1976. On March 6, a hiker between Parley's Canyon and Emigration Canyon found her partially clothed body north of Interstate 80. Harmon had been strangled and beaten; her murder occurred the day after Bundy was found guilty of aggravated kidnapping and three months before he was sentenced to prison and incarcerated on June 30. Her case is still unsolved.

=== Other victims ===
- Rhonda Stapley, 21-year-old U of U student, was waiting at a bus stop in Salt Lake City on October 11, 1974, when she was allegedly approached by Bundy, who had pulled over and offered her a ride in his Volkswagen Beetle. After entering his vehicle, Bundy drove to an isolated canyon picnic spot, shut off the engine, turned to her and threatened to kill her. He then repeatedly choked and raped Stapley over a period of three hours until Bundy, who thought she was dead, was distracted by something near his car and she was able to run into the woods. Although Stapley would not publicly acknowledge the incident until 2011, her account was supported by Rule, who said that it was consistent with the FBI's timeline of Bundy's activities in 1974.

=== Disproven ===
- Rita Patricia Curran, a 24-year-old elementary school teacher and part-time motel maid, was murdered in her basement apartment on July 19, 1971, in Burlington, Vermont; she had been strangled, bludgeoned and raped. The time of death was later given as approximately midnight. The location of the motel where she worked which was adjacent to Bundy's birthplace, the Elizabeth Lund Home for Unwed Mothers, and similarities to known Bundy crime scenes led retired FBI agent John Bassett to propose him as a suspect. Bundy told Keppel that he murdered a young woman in 1971 in Burlington when he was there to obtain information about his birth, but denied specific involvement in the Curran case to Hagmaier on the eve of his execution. No evidence firmly places Bundy in Burlington on that date, but municipal records note that a person named "Bundy" was bitten by a dog that week, and long stretches of Bundy's time—including the summer of 1971—remain unaccounted for. In 2023, the Burlington Police Department announced that Curran's killer was her next-door neighbor, William DeRoos, who had been identified using DNA extracted from a discarded cigarette butt found at the crime scene.
- Bundy was a suspect in the murder of a female student at his alma mater, Stanford University, committed between February 1973 and October 1974. Forensic genetic genealogy later linked this murder to John Getreu, who was arrested in 2018 and convicted of serial murders in 2021 and 2023.
- Katherine Merry Devine, aged 14, was abducted on November 25, 1973; her body was found the following month in the Capitol State Forest near Olympia, Washington. DNA analysis led to the arrest and conviction of William Cosden for Devine's murder in 2002. Cosden is also considered a suspect in the murder of Brenda Joy Baker (see above).

== In media ==
=== Books ===
- Rule, Ann (1980). The Stranger Beside Me. W.W. Norton and Company Inc. ISBN 978-1-938402-78-4
- Kendall, Elizabeth (1981). The Phantom Prince: My Life with Ted Bundy. Abrams & Chronicle Books. ISBN 978-1419744853
- Michaud, Stephen G., and Hugh Aynesworth (2000). Ted Bundy: Conversations with a Killer. Authorlink Press. ISBN 978-1928704-17-1
- Sullivan, Kevin M (2009). The Bundy Murders: A Comprehensive History. McFarland and Company Inc. ISBN 978-0-786444-26-7
- Michaud, Stephen G., and Hugh Aynesworth (2012). The Only Living Witness: The True Story of Serial Sex Killer Ted Bundy. Authorlink. ISBN 978-1928704119
- Carlisle, Al (2017). Violent Mind: The 1976 Psychological Assessment of Ted Bundy. Genius Book Publishing. ISBN 978-0998297-37-8
- Nelson, Polly (2019). Defending the Devil: My Story as Ted Bundy's Last Lawyer. Echo Point Books & Media. ISBN 978-1635617-91-7
- Kleiner Rubin, Kathy, and Emilie Le Beau Lucchesi (2023), A Light in the Dark: Surviving More Than Ted Bundy. Chicago Review Press. ISBN 978-1641608-68-8
- Knoll, Jessica. (2023). Bright Young Women. Marysue Rucci Books. ISBN 1501153226
- Fraser, Caroline. (2025). Murderland: Crime and Bloodlust in the Time of Serial Killers. Penguin Press. ISBN 9780593657225

=== Film ===
- Ted Bundy (2002), played by Michael Reilly Burke
- The Stranger Beside Me (2003), played by Billy Campbell
- The Riverman (2004), played by Cary Elwes
- Bundy: An American Icon (2008), played by Corin Nemec
- Extremely Wicked, Shockingly Evil and Vile (2019), played by Zac Efron
- Ted Bundy: American Boogeyman (2021), played by Chad Michael Murray
- No Man of God (2021), played by Luke Kirby

=== Music ===
- The song "Ted, Just Admit it..." by Jane's Addiction
- The song "Lotta True Crime" by Penelope Scott references Bundy
- The song "Video Crimes" by Tin Machine references Bundy
- The song "Blow" by Tyler, The Creator
- The song "epaR" by Earl Sweatshirt and Vince Staples references Bundy
- The song "Ted Bundy" by Theory of a Deadman

=== Television ===
- The Deliberate Stranger (1986), played by Mark Harmon
- The Capture of the Green River Killer (2008), played by James Marsters
- Ted Bundy: Devil in Disguise (2017)
- Ted Bundy: An American Monster (2017)
- Ted Bundy: What Happened (2017)
- Conversations with a Killer: The Ted Bundy Tapes (2019)
- Ted Bundy: Falling for a Killer (2020)
- Monster: The Ed Gein Story, season 3, episode 8 (2025), played by John T. O'Brien

== See also ==
- Capital punishment in Florida
- List of people executed in Florida
- List of people executed in the United States in 1989
- List of serial killers in the United States
- List of people executed by electrocution

== General and cited sources ==
- Barth, Christian (2020). The Garden State Parkway Murders. Denver: WildBlue Press. ISBN 978-1-948239-76-9.
- Dekle, George R. Sr. (2011). The Last Murder: The Investigation, Prosecution, and Execution of Ted Bundy (Hardcover ed.). Santa Barbara, California: Praeger (Imprint of ABC-CLIO). ISBN 978-0-313-39743-1.
- Foreman, Laura (1992). Serial Killers – True Crime (Hardcover ed.). Alexandria, Virginia: Time-Life Books. ISBN 978-0-7835-0001-0.
- Geberth, Vernon (2015). Practical Homicide Investigation – Tactics, Procedures and Forensic Techniques (5th ed.). Boca Raton, Florida: CRC Press. ISBN 978-1-4822-3507-4.
- Kendall, Elizabeth (September 1981). The Phantom Prince: My Life With Ted Bundy (Hardcover, 1st ed.). Seattle, Washington: Madrona. ISBN 978-0-914842-70-5.(Elizabeth Kloepfer, writing under a pseudonym)
- Keppel, Robert (2005). The Riverman: Ted Bundy and I Hunt for the Green River Killer (Paperback ed.). New York City: Pocket Books. ISBN 978-0-7434-6395-9. Updated after the arrest and confession of the Green River killer, Gary Ridgway.
- Keppel, Robert (2010). The Riverman: Ted Bundy and I Hunt for the Green River Killer (Kindle ed.). New York City: Simon & Schuster. ISBN 978-1-4391-9434-8.
- Keppel, Robert D.; Michaud, Stephen G. (2011). Terrible Secrets: Ted Bundy on Serial Murder (Enhanced E-Book ed.). Irving, Texas: Authorlink Press. ISBN 978-1-928704-97-3.
- Larsen, Richard W. (1980). Bundy: The Deliberate Stranger (Hardcover ed.). Englewood Cliffs, New Jersey: Prentice Hall. ISBN 978-0-13-089185-3.
- Mello, Michael A. (1997). Dead Wrong: A Death Row Lawyer Speaks Out Against Capital Punishment (Paperback ed.). Madison, Wisconsin: The University of Wisconsin Press. ISBN 0-299-15344-4.
- Michaud, Stephen; Aynesworth, Hugh (1983). The Only Living Witness: The True Story of Serial Sex Killer Ted Bundy. New York City: Linden Press / Simon & Schuster. ISBN 978-0-671449-61-2.
- Michaud, Stephen; Aynesworth, Hugh (August 1999) [1983]. The Only Living Witness: The True Story of Serial Sex Killer Ted Bundy (Paperback; revised ed.). Irving, Texas: Authorlink Press. ISBN 978-1-928704-11-9. Archived from the original on May 23, 2024.
- Michaud, Stephen; Aynesworth, Hugh (October 1989). Ted Bundy: Conversations with a Killer (Paperback ed.). New York City: Signet Books. ISBN 978-0-451-16355-4. Transcripts of the authors' Death Row interviews with Bundy
- Morris, Rebecca (2013). Ted and Ann: The Mystery of a Missing Child and Her Neighbor Ted Bundy (2nd ed.). New York City: CreateSpace. ISBN 978-1484925089.
- Nelson, Polly (1994). Defending the Devil: My Story as Ted Bundy's Last Lawyer. New York City: William Morrow. ISBN 978-0-688-10823-6.
- Rule, Ann (1980). The Stranger Beside Me (First ed.). New York and London: W. W. Norton & Company. ISBN 0-393-01399-5.
- Rule, Ann (1989). The Stranger Beside Me (Paperback; revised and updated ed.). New York City: Signet Books. ISBN 978-0-451-16493-3.
- Rule, Ann (2000). The Stranger Beside Me (Paperback; updated 20th anniversary ed.). New York: Signet Books. ISBN 978-0-451-20326-7.
- Rule, Ann (2009). The Stranger Beside Me (Paperback; updated 2009 ed.). New York City: Pocket Books. ISBN 978-1-4165-5959-7.
- Stone, Michael (2009). The Anatomy of Evil. New York City: Prometheus Books. ISBN 978-1-5910-2726-3.
- Sullivan, Kevin M. (2009). The Bundy Murders: A Comprehensive History (Paperback ed.). Jefferson, North Carolina: McFarland and Co. ISBN 978-0-7864-4426-7.
- Sullivan, Kevin (2020). The Enigma of Ted Bundy: The Questions and Controversies Surrounding America's Most Infamous Serial Killer (ebook ed.). Denver, Colorado: WildBlue Press. ISBN 978-1-952225-37-6. Archived from the original on March 27, 2024.
- Von Drehle, David (1995). Among the lowest of the dead: inside death row. New York: Fawcett Crest. ISBN 978-0-449-22523-3.
- Winn, Steven; Merrill, David (1980). Ted Bundy: The Killer Next Door (Paperback ed.). New York City: Bantam Books. ISBN 978-0-553-13637-1.
