= Fashion Place =

- Fashion Place in 2026
- Location: Murray, Utah, United States
- Coordinates: 40°38′10″N 111°53′09″W
- Address: 6191 South State Street
- Opened: 1972; 54 years ago
- Developer: The Hahn Company
- Manager: Brookfield Properties
- Owner: Brookfield Properties
- Num. of stores: 133
- Num. of anchor tenants: 4
- Floor area: 965,464 sq ft (89,694.5 m^{2})
- Floors: 1 (2 in Dillard's, H&M, Macy's, and Nordstrom)
- Website: www.fashionplace.com

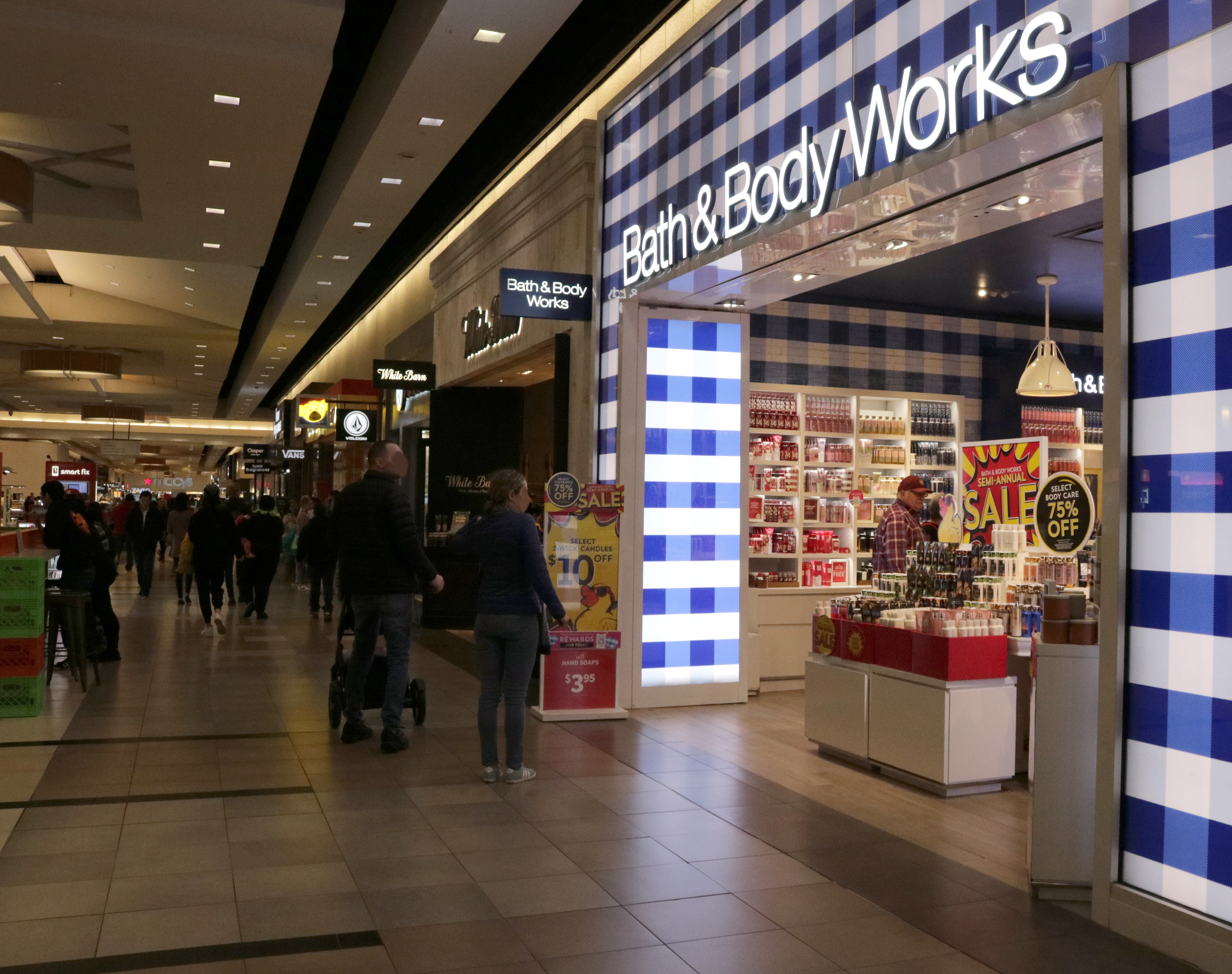
Fashion Place Shopping Mall

Fashion Place is an upscale shopping mall in Murray, Utah, United States. It opened in 1972, and is currently anchored by Nordstrom, Crate & Barrel, Macy's, and Dillard's.

== History ==
Fashion Place was opened in 1972 including Auerbach's (later Nordstrom) and Sears as its anchors. It also included Castleton's (later ZCMI, then Meier & Frank, now Macy's) and The Broadway (later Weinstock's), which became Utah's first Dillard's in 1993. An expansion begun in 2007 added an outdoor lifestyle center section, plus a new location for Nordstrom. Further expansion in 2011 added the first locations in Utah for both Crate & Barrel and H&M.

Sears announced in 2013 that it closed the Fashion Place store and the building was demolished and replaced with a new Dillard's in 2015. The old building would later be demolished in 2016. The closure of the Macy's store, one of the smallest in the chain, was announced in January 2014. By year's end, the former Macy's became The Container Store, the first in Utah. Macy's returned to the Fashion Place Mall in early March 2017, located in the old Dillard's space.

Fashion Place has a history of welcoming first-to-Utah brands. The mall is currently home to Utah's only Zara, Crate & Barrel, Urban Outfitters, The Container Store, and Abercrombie Kids locations.

On November 8, 1974, serial killer Ted Bundy attempted and failed to kidnap Carol DaRonch from the mall by posing as a plainclothes police officer. This eventually led to his first conviction, putting him behind bars for the first time.

In 1987, the mall was one of the music video locations for Tiffany's cover of "I Think We're Alone Now", which topped the Billboard Hot 100 for two weeks.

On January 13, 2019, at about 1:30pm, a gang-related shooting injured two members, one in critical condition. Five men were charged in connection with the shooting, with several wanted suspects still at large. Two Florencia 13 members, males aged 19 and 20, were charged in the attack. The entire mall was evacuated by police shortly after the shooting, and reopened Monday to the public.
