= Ted Bundy: Falling for a Killer =

American true crime docuseries

- Promotional poster
- Genre: Docu-series
- Created by: Trish Wood
- Written by: Richard O'Regan; Carolyn Saunders
- Directed by: Trish Wood
- Opening theme: " White Foxes" by Susanne Sundfør
- Composer: Ariel Marx
- Country of origin: United States
- Original language: English
- No. of seasons: 1
- No. of episodes: 5

Production
- Producer: Trish Wood
- Cinematography: Scott McClellan
- Editors: Eamonn O'Connor, Steve Taylor, Peter Denes
- Running time: 37–52 minutes
- Production company: Amazon Studios

Original release
- Network: Amazon Prime Video
- Release: January 30, 2020

Ted Bundy: Falling for a Killer is a 2020 American true crime docuseries that premiered on Amazon Prime Video on January 30, 2020. The 5-part miniseries was created and directed by Trish Wood. Many viewers who rated the film praised its emphasis on victims, while some objected to its focus on the feminist movement. The incorporation of feminist critique and social contextualization is akin to that seen in later episodes of the Netflix crime docuseries, The Ripper.

== Premise ==
Ted Bundy: Falling for a Killer recounts the murders, trials and execution of serial killer Ted Bundy from the perspective of his long-time girlfriend Elizabeth Kendall and her daughter, Molly. The series uses archival footage and photographs as well as interviews with victims who survived his attacks, police, reporters and others involved in the cases.

== Episodes ==
No.	Title	Directed by	Written by	Original release date
1	"Boy Meets Girl"	Trish Wood	Richard O'Regan & Carolyn Saunders	January 30, 2020
Elizabeth Kendall meets Ted Bundy who was studying to be a lawyer at the time. Female students start disappearing and Ted has a breakdown.
2	"Falling"	Trish Wood	Richard O'Regan & Carolyn Saunders	January 30, 2020
Students in Washington continue to go missing. Ted plans to move to Utah and refuses to ask Elizabeth to go with him.
3	"Gone Girls"	Trish Wood	Richard O'Regan & Carolyn Saunders	January 30, 2020
Ted and Elizabeth Kendall move to Utah where Ted Bundy is continuing Law school. Women start to go missing in Utah and Elizabeth starts to question Ted.
4	"Take Care Of Yourself, Young Man"	Trish Wood	Richard O'Regan & Carolyn Saunders	January 30, 2020
Ted Bundy escapes from jail and disappears. Later on women start to go missing in Florida which lead people to believe where he is located.
5	"Collateral Damage"	Trish Wood	Richard O'Regan & Carolyn Saunders	January 30, 2020
Ted is caught and sentenced to die. He confesses everything in hopes to change his sentence. As for Elizabeth and her daughter they struggle to move on with their lives.

== See also ==
- Extremely Wicked, Shockingly Evil and Vile
