= Nita Neary =

American artist (born 1957)

- Born: Nita Jane Neary; 1957 (age 68–69); Florida, U.S.
- Other names: Nita J. Neary; Nita Duechle; Nita Gary Duechle
- Education: Florida State University
- Alma mater: Ball State University
- Years active: 1978 – 1980
- Children: 2
- Parent: Wanda Neary (mother)

Nita Jane Neary (born 1957) is the key eyewitness in the trial that led to the conviction of serial killer Ted Bundy. Her identification of Bundy fleeing the Chi Omega sorority house at Florida State University (FSU) provided the crucial link between the physical evidence and the defendant during the 1979 "Chi Omega" trial.

== Early life and education ==
Nita Jane Neary was born in 1957, in Florida. Neary was an art student at Florida State University (FSU) in Tallahassee, Florida, during the late 1970s. She was a member of the Chi Omega sorority and resided in the sorority house on campus. Later she moved to study art at Ball State University in Muncie, Indiana.

== Events of January 15, 1978 ==
In early 1978, Neary was a 21-year-old art student and a resident of the Chi Omega house at 595 West Jefferson Street in Tallahassee. At approximately 3:00 a.m., Bundy entered the sorority house through a rear door with a faulty lock. He murdered Margaret Bowman and Lisa Levy in their sleep and severely beat Kathy Kleiner and Karen Chandler. Neary returned from a date at 3:12 a.m. As she entered the back door, she heard footsteps running down the stairs. Standing in the foyer, she saw a man in profile about to exit the front door.

Neary noted the intruder was holding a heavy oak club in both hands. She described him as having a "sharp nose," thin lips, and wearing a dark blue knit cap and a light-colored jacket. Neary did not realize a crime had occurred until she woke her roommate, Nancy Dowdy. Together, they discovered a bloodied Karen Chandler in the hallway, triggering the 911 call that brought police to the scene.

=== Investigation and identification ===
Neary's testimony was initially complicated by the fact that she only saw the intruder's profile for a few seconds in low light. To enhance her memory, investigators had Neary undergo forensic hypnosis. The defense later used this to argue that her memory had been "contaminated" or "programmed" by police suggestions. On April 7, 1978, while Bundy was in custody, Neary viewed a photographic lineup. She correctly identified Bundy's photo, noting the distinctive profile she had observed on the night of the murders.

== 1979 trial ==
During the trial in Miami, Neary was the prosecution's "star witness". Her testimony was essential because forensic evidence (such as the famous bite mark) was circumstantial without a witness placing Bundy at the house.

On July 17, 1979, prosecutor Larry Simpson asked Neary if the man she saw was in the courtroom. Neary pointed directly at Ted Bundy. Bundy, who acted as his own co-counsel, cross-examined the lead investigator about Neary's hypnosis, attempting to discredit her. However, Judge Edward Cowart ruled that Neary's identification was based on her original observation, not the hypnosis.

Neary's mother, Wanda Neary, was a presence during the proceedings. A specific point of contention involved newspapers she reportedly brought to court or that were in the family home. The defense argued that Nita had been exposed to these newspaper photographs of Bundy before she made her formal identification, potentially "contaminating" her memory.

Neary testified that the newspaper photographs—which typically showed Bundy's full face—did not influence her because she had seen the intruder in profile, which matched the specific profile photo she selected during the police lineup.

== Personal life ==
Following the trial, Neary retreated from public life to maintain her privacy, though she remains one of the most cited witnesses in American legal textbooks regarding eyewitness reliability. She is married and has children.

== Significance and legacy ==
Neary is widely credited with preventing further loss of life. Kathy Kleiner, who survived the attack, stated in a Rolling Stone interview that the light from the car dropping Neary off "spooked" Bundy, causing him to stop beating her and flee.

== In popular culture ==
She is a primary figure in Ann Rule's true crime classic The Stranger Beside Me. She also inspired the character "Pamela" in the 2023 novel Bright Young Women by Jessica Knoll. Neary's actual trial footage is used extensively in the Netflix documentary Conversations with a Killer: The Ted Bundy Tapes.

== See also ==
- Ted Bundy

== General and cited sources ==
- Michaud, Stephen; Aynesworth, Hugh (1983). The Only Living Witness: The True Story of Serial Sex Killer Ted Bundy. New York City: Linden Press / Simon & Schuster. ISBN 978-0-671449-61-2.
- Michaud, Stephen; Aynesworth, Hugh (August 1999) [1983]. The Only Living Witness: The True Story of Serial Sex Killer Ted Bundy (Paperback; revised ed.). Irving, Texas: Authorlink Press. ISBN 978-1-928704-11-9. Archived from the original on May 23, 2024.
- Rule, Ann (1980). The Stranger Beside Me (First ed.). New York and London: W. W. Norton & Company. ISBN 0-393-01399-5.
- Rule, Ann (1989). The Stranger Beside Me (Paperback; revised and updated ed.). New York City: Signet Books. ISBN 978-0-451-16493-3.
- Rule, Ann (2000). The Stranger Beside Me (Paperback; updated 20th anniversary ed.). New York: Signet Books. ISBN 978-0-451-20326-7.
- Rule, Ann (2009). The Stranger Beside Me (Paperback; updated 2009 ed.). New York City: Pocket Books. ISBN 978-1-4165-5959-7.
- Sullivan, Kevin M. (2009). The Bundy Murders: A Comprehensive History (Paperback ed.). Jefferson, North Carolina: McFarland and Co. ISBN 978-0-7864-4426-7.
- Sullivan, Kevin (2020). The Enigma of Ted Bundy: The Questions and Controversies Surrounding America's Most Infamous Serial Killer (ebook ed.). Denver, Colorado: WildBlue Press. ISBN 978-1-952225-37-6. Archived from the original on March 27, 2024.
