= Kathy Kleiner Rubin =

American author (born 1957)

- Born: Kathy Kleiner; December 29, 1957 (age 68); Miami, Florida, U. S.
- Education: Florida State University
- Spouse: Scott Rubin
- Children: 1

Kathy Kleiner Rubin (born December 29, 1957) is a survivor of the serial killer Ted Bundy. She is primarily known for surviving a brutal 1978 attack at the Florida State University (FSU) Chi Omega sorority house, an event that became a focal point in the prosecution and eventual conviction of Bundy.

== Early life and education ==
Born in Florida to a Cuban-American family, Kleiner Rubin grew up in Miami and Fort Lauderdale. At age 13, she was diagnosed with systemic lupus erythematosus, a life-threatening autoimmune disease that severely impacted her kidneys. She underwent experimental chemotherapy treatments that caused hair loss and forced her to be homeschooled during the seventh grade.

She attended high school in Fort Lauderdale, where she was active in the theater department, and graduated in 1976. Later that year, she enrolled at Florida State University in Tallahassee.

== Chi Omega Attack (1978) ==
In the early morning hours of January 15, 1978, Ted Bundy entered the FSU Chi Omega sorority house through a door with a faulty lock. After murdering two residents, Margaret Bowman and Lisa Levy, he entered Room 8, which was shared by Kleiner Rubin and her roommate, Karen Chandler.

Bundy struck Kleiner Rubin with a heavy oak log, shattering her jaw in three places and nearly severing her tongue. He then attacked Chandler. Both women were saved when the headlights of a car arriving to drop off another sorority sister Nita Neary shone through their window, startling Bundy and causing him to flee.

Kleiner Rubin underwent extensive surgery and had her jaw wired shut for nine weeks. She later testified against Bundy during his 1979 trial in Miami.

== Later life and advocacy ==
Following the attack, Kleiner Rubin briefly worked at a lumberyard—a deliberate choice to confront her fear of the smell of oak, which she associated with the log used in the attack. In her early thirties, she survived another major health crisis after being diagnosed with stage 2 breast cancer, which required further chemotherapy. For decades, Kleiner Rubin has worked as a hospital buyer and motivational speaker. In 2023, she published her memoir, A Light in the Dark: Surviving More than Ted Bundy, co-authored with Emilie Le Beau Lucchesi.

== Personal life ==
Kleiner Rubin is retired and lives in South Florida with her husband, Scott Rubin, a neuroscientist. Kleiner Rubin is married and has one son.

== Published works ==
- A Light in the Dark: Surviving More Than Ted Bundy (2023)

== See also ==
- Ted Bundy

== General and cited sources ==
- Michaud, Stephen; Aynesworth, Hugh (1983). The Only Living Witness: The True Story of Serial Sex Killer Ted Bundy. New York City: Linden Press / Simon & Schuster. ISBN 978-0-671449-61-2.
- Michaud, Stephen; Aynesworth, Hugh (August 1999) [1983]. The Only Living Witness: The True Story of Serial Sex Killer Ted Bundy (Paperback; revised ed.). Irving, Texas: Authorlink Press. ISBN 978-1-928704-11-9. Archived from the original on May 23, 2024.
- Rule, Ann (1980). The Stranger Beside Me (First ed.). New York and London: W. W. Norton & Company. ISBN 0-393-01399-5.
- Rule, Ann (1989). The Stranger Beside Me (Paperback; revised and updated ed.). New York City: Signet Books. ISBN 978-0-451-16493-3.
- Rule, Ann (2000). The Stranger Beside Me (Paperback; updated 20th anniversary ed.). New York: Signet Books. ISBN 978-0-451-20326-7.
- Rule, Ann (2009). The Stranger Beside Me (Paperback; updated 2009 ed.). New York City: Pocket Books. ISBN 978-1-4165-5959-7.
- Sullivan, Kevin M. (2009). The Bundy Murders: A Comprehensive History (Paperback ed.). Jefferson, North Carolina: McFarland and Co. ISBN 978-0-7864-4426-7.
- Sullivan, Kevin (2020). The Enigma of Ted Bundy: The Questions and Controversies Surrounding America's Most Infamous Serial Killer (ebook ed.). Denver, Colorado: WildBlue Press. ISBN 978-1-952225-37-6. Archived from the original on March 27, 2024.
