= Karen Chandler Pryor =

American advocator (born 1957)

- Born: Karen Chandler; 1957 (age 68–69); St. Petersburg, Florida, U. S.
- Other name: Karen Pryor
- Education: Florida State University
- Spouse: Ross Pryor (husband)
- Children: 2

Karen Chandler Pryor (born 1957) is known for surviving an attack by serial killer Ted Bundy. As a senior at Florida State University (FSU) in 1978, she was one of four women targeted during Bundy's frenzied assault on the Chi Omega sorority house.

== Early life and education ==
Pryor grew up in St. Petersburg and Tallahassee, Florida. She enrolled at Florida State University and joined the Chi Omega sorority during the fall of her freshman year.

== The Chi Omega Attack ==
In the early hours of January 15, 1978, Bundy entered the Chi Omega house while the residents were asleep. After fatally attacking two other women, he entered the room shared by Chandler and her roommate, Kathy Kleiner.

Bundy bludgeoned the women with a heavy oak firewood limb. Chandler was the first victim found after the attack; she was discovered staggering down the hallway, severely injured and dripping blood. Chandler suffered catastrophic trauma, including a broken jaw, four knocked-out teeth, a skull fracture, a broken right arm, and a crushed index finger. The attack ended when the headlights of a car—driven by a sorority sister Nita Neary's boyfriend—spooked Bundy, causing him to flee before he could inflict fatal injuries.

=== Legal testimony ===
On July 10, 1979, Chandler testified against Bundy in his Miami murder trial. While on the stand, she stated she had no visual memory of her attacker, only the sound of a "loud banging noise" and being loaded into an ambulance. Her testimony, along with that of other survivors, was instrumental in securing Bundy's conviction on multiple counts of murder and attempted murder.

=== Later life ===
Following her recovery, Pryor graduated from FSU and moved to Atlanta, Georgia, where she began a career as an assistant buyer for Rich's department store.

== Personal life ==
She married Ross Pryor, an engineer, and they have two children, Kelly Pryor and Cary Pryor.

== Advocacy ==
For decades, Pryor maintained a private life until the 2019 release of the film Extremely Wicked, Shockingly Evil and Vile sparked renewed media interest. In recent years, she has participated in several documentaries and podcasts.

== In popular culture ==
- She was portrayed by actress Marietta Melrose in the 2021 film Ted Bundy: American Boogeyman.

== See also ==
- Ted Bundy

== General and cited sources ==
- Rule, Ann (1980). The Stranger Beside Me (First ed.). New York and London: W. W. Norton & Company. ISBN 0-393-01399-5.
- Rule, Ann (1989). The Stranger Beside Me (Paperback; revised and updated ed.). New York City: Signet Books. ISBN 978-0-451-16493-3.
- Rule, Ann (2000). The Stranger Beside Me (Paperback; updated 20th anniversary ed.). New York: Signet Books. ISBN 978-0-451-20326-7.
- Rule, Ann (2009). The Stranger Beside Me (Paperback; updated 2009 ed.). New York City: Pocket Books. ISBN 978-1-4165-5959-7.
