= Practice to Deceive =

2013 book by Ann Rule

- Author: Ann Rule
- Cover artist: Lewelin Polanco
- Language: English
- Genre: Nonfiction/True crime
- Publisher: Gallery Books
- Publication date: 2013
- Publication place: United States
- Media type: Print (Hardback), e-book, audio-CD
- Pages: 352 pp
- ISBN: 978-1416544623
- OCLC: 2013021350
- Dewey Decimal: 364.152/30979775
- LC Class: HV6533.W2 R854 2013

Practice to Deceive is a 2013 true crime nonfiction book by the American author Ann Rule that details the murder of Russel Douglas, found shot between the eyes in his car on Whidbey Island, north of Seattle, Washington, the day after Christmas 2003. The book was released in October 2013 by Simon & Schuster's Gallery Books imprint.

== Synopsis ==
On December 26, 2003, on Whidbey Island, Washington, police discover the body of Russel Douglas. The body is found in Douglas's car and displays a fatal gunshot wound to the face, between Douglas's eyes. The police quickly rule out suicide, as no gun is found near the car, and pursue a homicide investigation.

The case takes nearly 10 years to solve, mostly due to the lack of physical evidence linking the scene of the crime or a weapon to anyone who knew Russel Douglas. The officers are pessimistic that the weapon will ever be found since it would be easy to dispose of it. While the detectives considered a possible motive for Brenna, Douglas's estranged wife, a former law enforcement officer reveals that he has a Bersa semiautomatic gun that fits the description of the weapon the police were searching for, and that he had been asked to hold it by James Huden. Huden, a former resident of Whidbey Island, was romantically involved with Peggy Sue Thomas. Thomas worked in a beauty salon with Brenna Douglas, but investigators found no clear cut motive. Thomas, a former beauty queen, had married several times. The book details Thomas's short and tempestuous marriage to Mark Allen, a wealthy rancher and co-owner of famed thoroughbred Mine That Bird.

Though forensic testing identified the Bersa as the murder weapon, Huden evaded capture by living incognito in Mexico. Nevertheless, Mexican authorities apprehended Huden and turned him over to American officials. With Huden in custody, investigators theorize that Douglas had been shot to death in a murder-for-hire plan orchestrated by Brenna Douglas, the beneficiary of his $500,000 life insurance policies. Prosecutors believed they had a strong case against Huden, and some evidence linking his actions to Thomas. Both were charged.

Ultimately, Huden went to trial first. In 2012, he was convicted by an Island County Superior Court jury of first-degree murder and was sentenced to 80 years in prison. Rather than trial, Thomas pleaded guilty to a lesser charge of rendering criminal assistance, and received a sentence of four years.

Brenna Douglas used the insurance money to buy a home, though it eventually fell into foreclosure. Nevertheless, Douglas, though never being charged, was the only person to receive any financial benefit as a direct result of Russel Douglas's murder.

Though concerned with the Douglas murder, author Rule also explored the tragic past of Thomas's family's history. Thomas's mother, Doris Stackhouse, had been the second wife of Thomas's father, Jimmie. In 1963, Mary Ellen Stackhouse, Jimmie's first wife, was brutally murdered in her home by Gilbert Thompson, a teenager who lived nearby. The Stackhouse daughters, who were still children at the time, were not told the grisly truth behind their mother's death. Ultimately, they learned the truth and confronted Thompson when he was up for parole. The board denied Thompson release, and he died in prison in 2004. In 1983, Rob Stackhouse, Mary Ellen's youngest child, was killed at a party. In 1995, Josh Little—Jimmie's son by his third wife—was killed in a motor vehicle accident in Salt Lake City. Brenda Stackhouse Gard, Peggy's sister, was found dead in her home in September 2011 while Peggy awaited trial for her role in the Douglas case. Brenda had been expected to testify against her sister at Peggy's trial, but authorities concluded that Peggy had no role in her sister's death.

== Reception ==
The book made two New York Times Best Seller lists the week of October 27 in hardcover and eBook nonfiction.

It was also No. 7 on The Wall Street Journal bestseller list, in the nonfiction e-book category, the week ending October 13, 2013. Upon its release, it was a Doubleday Book Club selection.

Kirkus Reviews wrote that "the reigning true-crime queen dips into the darker side of love and mayhem in her latest microscopic take on homicide." At the same time, Kirkus wrote, "While the crime’s particulars might be fascinating to Whidbey (Washington) residents and friends of the participants, in Rule’s hands, they’re underwhelming and dull."

Reviewer Kathe Connair for StarTribune wrote, "Bestselling author Ann Rule falters in her latest book Practice to Deceive", noting that first-person asides "creep in toward the end of the book, including multiple, jarring references to the fact that Rule had to keep changing her plane tickets to accommodate new trial dates."

Book Reporter wrote that "Rule’s hard work pays off in her newest, gritty account." True Crime Zine wrote "The veteran true crime author outlines the homicide investigation that would take detectives from one coast to the other, with a few stops in between."
