= Lust Killer (book) =

1983 book by Ann Rule

- Cover
- Author: Ann Rule
- Language: English
- Genre: True crime
- Publisher: Berkley Books
- Publication date: June 7, 1983
- Publication place: United States
- English publication date: 1983
- Pages: 238
- ISBN: 978-0-451-16687-6

Lust Killer is a 1983 true crime book written by Ann Rule under the pseudonym Andy Stack. The book tells the story of serial killer Jerry Brudos, who killed four young women in Oregon in the late 1960s, motivated by the fetishization of women's feet, lingerie, and shoes.

== Background ==
Ann Rule became known as an author in 1980 when she published the book The Stranger Beside Me, which tells her account as a coworker and a friend of serial killer Ted Bundy, whom she met at a crisis hotline center in Seattle in 1971. Rule recalled nothing disturbing in Bundy's personality, describing him instead as kind and empathetic.

After the success of The Stranger Beside Me, Rule began a career as a true crime writer, publishing many books about American criminals in the years that followed. Her writing style and how she dealt with Bundy's case have drawn both praise and criticism.

== Plot summary ==
=== First part ===
In the late 1960s in Salem, Oregon, a local electrician named Jerry Brudos was known as a gentle family man who lived with his wife and two children. However, Brudos's sexual life harbors dark secrets revolving around hatred and violence towards women, with a deep obsession for women's foot fetishism, lingerie, and female high heels. By 1967, Brudos's obsessions worsen; he forbids his wife from entering the garage workshop, where he keeps a large freezer.

Brudos's actions are narrated in the first part of the book, showing his escalating violence, which goes from stalking women and stealing lingerie and female shoes to abduction, torture, rape, and murder. Brudos forces his young victims—females aged 18 to 24 years old—to pose for photographs while using his fetishistic items and engage in sadistic bondage. After murdering them, Brudos's sexual sadism does not relent, escalating into necrophilia and mutilation. Once he takes photographs of the bodies in different positions and accessories, he disposes of the bodies in local rivers.

=== Second part ===
In the second half of the book, Rule narrates the local police investigation led by Lieutenant James Stovall. Facing missing women cases leaving no trace, Stovall and his department frantically look for physical evidence about the person behind the disappearances. After two fishermen find body parts in a shallow section of the Long Tom River, investigation leads to clues linking the killer to tools used by an electrician. Subsequent inquiries with students at Oregon State University (OSU) reveal a pattern of harassment by a man identifying himself as a Vietnam veteran.

Around the dates that fishermen found the remains of two victims in the river, Brudos met with a young woman and a student at OSU. During the conversation with the woman, Brudos made a mention of the bodies found at Long Tom River, asking her how she knew that he would not take her to the river and strangle her. The evidence from the particular electrician's wiring with which the victims had been tied was quickly linked to Brudos after the OSU student tipped him off with police. Following detectives' instructions, the woman arranged another meeting with Brudos, whereupon police apprehended and interrogated him, leading to the discovery of gruesome evidence at his home.

Drawing parallels with other serial killers, especially from the Pacific Northwest, Rule finds similarities between Brudos and Bundy, as well as others like Harvey Carignan and Randall Woodfield. Rule notes how some sexually sadistic killers are in need of control, power, and absolute dominance over women. Police arrested Brudos in May 1969 after searching his garage workshop, where investigators found dismembered body parts in a fridge, numerous female ornaments and shoes, and many Polaroid pictures of the victims, including of a woman's body hanging from the roof of Brudos's garage and positioned in front of a mirror, where Brudos's face can be seen.

== Reception ==
The book received positive reviews from critics. Anne Mendez, a book reviewer from Salem, Oregon, where Brudos committed his crimes, gave Lust Killer a five-star review. Mendez highlighted Rule's style of writing and ability to analyze serial killers' psychological profiles from her experiences with the Bundy case.

Hayley Newlin of Cemetery Dance Publications praised Rule as an exemplar of a true crime writer. Newlin said that Rule demonstrates a "spine-tingling, maddening web of terror while still harnessing the immense, crushing weight of loss and law enforcement’s desperation." She ended her positive review of the book by noting how Rule explains the evolution of Brudos's behavior from a childhood fascination for women's feet to extreme violence as an adult, which Newlin linked to male criminals and their toxic relationships with their mothers, as was Brudos's case.

Other reviews praising Rule came from outlets like the Seattle Times, the New York Daily News, The San Francisco Chronicle, among others.
