= Kill Me Again (disambiguation) =

Kill Me Again is a 1989 American neo-noir thriller film.

Kill Me Again may also refer to:

- Kill Me Again, a 1996 novel by Leslie Rule
- Kill Me Again, a 2016 novel by Rachel Abbott
- "Kill Me Again", a song by Oomph! from Wahrheit oder Pflicht
- Croaker: Kill Me Again, a 1994 novel by Paul Bishop
- "Widow: Kill Me Again", a comic book mini-series by Mike Wolfer
