= Murder of Joe Tarricone =

American Businessman Homicide

- Born: Joseph Anthony Tarricone; January 7, 1925; Brooklyn, New York City, U.S.
- Died: September 29, 1978 (aged 53); Puyallup, Washington, U.S.
- Cause of death: Homicide
- Body discovered: June 4, 2007, Puyallup, Washington, U.S.
- Resting place: Mount Calvary Cemetery, Albuquerque, New Mexico, U.S.

Joseph Anthony Tarricone (January 7, 1925 – September 29, 1978) was an American businessman who was murdered by his girlfriend, Renee Curtiss, and her brother, Nicholas Notaro. His dismembered remains were discovered buried on the property of a home in Puyallup, Washington, in June 2007.

His murder has been the subject of various television documentaries, such as the Oxygen series Buried in the Backyard, as well as being written on extensively by true crime writer Ann Rule in her 2011 book Don't Look Behind You.

His case is also featured on the Season 2, Episode 8 titled “Mommy’s Little Killers”, from the show Deadly Sins.

== Background ==
Joseph Tarricone was born January 7, 1925, in Brooklyn, New York City, the first child of Catholic Italian-American parents. In the early 1940s, he met and married his wife, Rose, with whom he had seven children. Tarricone served in World War II and the Korean War before relocating to Seattle, Washington. While there, he began operating his own meat business, Alaska Meat Provisions, based in Anchorage, Alaska, and would divide time between there and Washington.

== Murder ==
After divorcing his wife in the early 1970s, Tarricone began dating Renee Curtiss (born August 1, 1953), a 25-year-old secretary who worked for his company. Tarricone's daughter alleged that the age difference was mitigated by the fact that Tarricone lavished her with gifts. In mid-1978, Curtiss broke off the relationship and relocated to live with her mother, Florence Geraldine Hess, in a rented home on Canyon Road in Puyallup, Washington. In the late summer of 1978, Tarricone visited his ex-wife, Rose, and his children in New Mexico, where they were living at the time.

On September 29, 1978, while Tarricone was visiting Seattle en route back to Alaska, Curtiss and her adopted brother, 30-year-old Nicholas Notaro (who had previously been charged with manslaughter and served time for a killing committed in Alaska the previous decade) shot him to death in the home Curtiss shared with her mother in Puyallup. Curtiss had lured Tarricone to the home under the pretext of him repairing the washing machine. In the basement, while Tarricone inspected the washing machine, Notaro shot him twice in the head, killing him. Afterward, Curtiss and Notaro dismembered his remains with a chainsaw before burying them in the home's backyard.

== Discovery and conviction ==
In June 2007, excavators digging up the property for new construction uncovered Tarricone's skeletal remains in a bag. Tarricone's daughter, Gypsy, had previously visited the home in late 1990 inquiring about her missing father, but Curtiss and her mother, Geraldine Hess, had relocated. The home's owner was able to refer law enforcement to Gypsy, and the remains were confirmed to be those of Tarricone after a DNA test was performed using her DNA for comparison.

Pierce County law enforcement interviewed then-60-year-old Nicholas Notaro about Tarricone's murder; he denied Curtiss's involvement, claiming he and his now-deceased mother, Hess, had murdered Tarricone, claiming he had been abusive toward Curtiss. Notaro claimed he and his mother stored Tarricone's body in a freezer prior to dismembering him. Police were skeptical of his version of events given that Tarricone was over 6 feet (1.8 m) tall and weighed over 200 pounds (91 kg), which would have made it unlikely that Notaro's elderly mother could have assisted in storing the body.

Detectives were able to track Curtiss's previous residences over the ensuing 29 years, which included several in San Francisco and Seattle. In 2007, they found her residing in a condominium in Seattle, and interviewed her under the guise of discussing the murder of which her brother had been convicted in the early 1970s.

Curtiss and Notaro were both formally charged with first-degree murder, and Curtiss testified in court that she had helped Notaro dismember Tarricone's body after he had shot him to death in the basement of her home. In April 2009, both Curtiss and Notaro were convicted of first-degree murder and sentenced to life imprisonment.

== Works cited ==
- Rule, Ann (2011). Don't Look Behind You. Ann Rule's Crime Files. Vol. 15. New York: Simon & Schuster. ISBN 978-1-451-64108-0.
