= Aileen Wuornos: American Boogeywoman =

American horror thriller film

- Promotional release poster
- Directed by: Daniel Farrands
- Written by: Daniel Farrands
- Produced by: Lucas Jarach; Daniel Farrands; Meadow Williams; Swen Temmel; Luke Daniels; Daniel Davila
- Starring: Peyton List; Tobin Bell; Lydia Hearst; Nick Vallelonga; Swen Temmel; Andrew Biernat
- Cinematography: Roberto Correa
- Edited by: Dan Riddle
- Music by: Steve Moore
- Production companies: 1428 Films; Green Light Pictures
- Distributed by: Dark Star Pictures; Voltage Pictures
- Release date: October 8, 2021; (VOD)
- Running time: 85 minutes
- Country: United States
- Language: English
- Box office: $15,202

Aileen Wuornos: American Boogeywoman is a 2021 American horror thriller film written and directed by Daniel Farrands. It shows a fictionalized version of the early life of serial killer Aileen Wuornos, with some real facts from her biography. It stars Peyton List as Wuornos, supporting cast includes Tobin Bell, Lydia Hearst, Nick Vallelonga, Swen Temmel, and Andrew Biernat.

The film was released as video-on-demand on October 8, 2021, and on DVD on October 15, 2021.

== Premise ==
The film is based on the early life of Aileen Wuornos in 1976 when she married wealthy yacht club commodore Lewis Fell, only to inflict mayhem within her new family and Florida's high society.

== Cast ==
- Peyton List as Aileen Wuornos
- Tobin Bell as Lewis Fell, Wuornos' Husband
- Lydia Hearst as Jennifer Fell
- Nick Vallelonga as Victor Miller
- Swen Temmel as Grady Miller
- Andrew Biernat as Mitch Miller
- Meadow Williams as Diane Pittman
- Joseph Schwartz as Keith
- Ashley Atwood as Older Aileen Wuornos
- Hamish Sturgeon as Peter

== Production ==
In March 2021, it was announced that Voltage Pictures acquired distribution rights to the film. Daniel Farrands, who directed the films Ted Bundy: American Boogeyman and The Haunting of Sharon Tate, became the project's director; Peyton List was cast in the lead role of a young Wuornos.

== Release and reception ==
=== Release ===
The film was scheduled for a theatrical release in the United States on September 20, 2021, by Fathom Events, but the release was canceled.

The film was released as video-on-demand on October 8, 2021, and on DVD on October 15, 2021, via Dark Star Pictures. It was shown at the Screamfest Horror Film Festival on October 13, 2021.

=== Critical reception ===
Brian Orndorf of Blu-ray.com gave the film 2 stars out of 10: "It’s crude exploitation from a one-note helmer who keeps trying to make his mark as some type of master of true crime fiction [...] This is really just horrible B-moviemaking."
