= The Murder of Nicole Brown Simpson =

2019 film by Daniel Farrands

- Poster
- Directed by: Daniel Farrands
- Written by: Michael Arter
- Produced by: Eric Brenner; Daniel Farrands; Lucas Jarach
- Starring: Mena Suvari; Nick Stahl
- Cinematography: Ben Demaree
- Edited by: Brian D'Augustine; Dan Riddle
- Music by: Michael Gatt
- Distributed by: Quiver Distribution
- Release dates: December 9, 2019 (United Kingdom); January 10, 2020 (United States)
- Running time: 82 minutes
- Country: United States
- Language: English

The Murder of Nicole Brown Simpson is a 2019 American crime thriller film directed by Daniel Farrands. The film is loosely based on the murder of Nicole Brown Simpson, presenting a fictionalized version of events in which Brown Simpson is murdered by serial killer Glen Edward Rogers, and not by O. J. Simpson, her ex-husband and the primary suspect in the case. Though Mena Suvari's performance as Nicole Brown was praised, the film was panned by critics.

== Cast ==
- Mena Suvari as Nicole Brown Simpson
- Nick Stahl as Glen Edward Rogers
- Taryn Manning as Faye Resnick
- Drew Roy as Ron Goldman
- Agnes Bruckner as Kris Kardashian
- Gene Freeman as O. J. Simpson
- Trent Walker as Bruce Jenner

== Reception ==
Review aggregator Rotten Tomatoes gives the film a 0% approval rating, based on nine reviews, with an average rating of 1.8/10. Frank Scheck of The Hollywood Reporter gave the film a negative review, stating that it (along with several of the director's other films) was the equivalent of "cinematic graverobbing" and that one of the film's only fans will likely be O. J. Simpson. Guy Lodge of Variety also gave it a negative review, calling it an "unabashedly tacky true-crime thriller" and writing that "it's a cheap, unloving death march of a movie", though Lodge offered some praise to Mena Suvari in the title role.

== See also ==
- The Haunting of Sharon Tate
- O.J.: Made in America
- The People v. O. J. Simpson: American Crime Story
