= Ted Bundy: American Boogeyman =

American thriller drama film

- Theatrical release poster
- Directed by: Daniel Farrands
- Written by: Daniel Farrands
- Produced by: Luke Daniels
- Starring: Chad Michael Murray; Holland Roden; Lin Shaye; Jake Hays; Olivia DeLaurentis; Diane Franklin; Marietta Melrose; Greer Grammer
- Cinematography: Luke Bazeli
- Edited by: Dan Riddle
- Music by: Steve Moore
- Production companies: 1428 Films; Green Light Pictures
- Distributed by: Fathom Events; Voltage Pictures
- Release date: August 16, 2021
- Running time: 96 mins
- Country: United States
- Language: English

Ted Bundy: American Boogeyman (known in Canada as Ted Bundy: American Psycho) is a 2021 American crime film written and directed by Daniel Farrands. The film stars Chad Michael Murray as serial killer Ted Bundy.

== Plot ==
The film concerns the murders committed by Ted Bundy in the 1970s and the subsequent manhunt to apprehend him, led by FBI agents Kathleen McChesney and Robert Ressler.

At the first scene, Ted Bundy abducts a woman in Midvale, Utah, on July 14, 1974. Janice Ann Ott and Denise Marie Naslund are killed. The victims of Bundy are under 25 according to Kathleen McChesney.

In 1977, Bundy escapes from a prison in Colorado.

Ted Bundy's mother, Louise, blames the circumstances surrounding her son being on the FBI Ten Most Wanted Fugitives, 1970s on "Teddy" having been born to an unwed mother.

Eventually, Bundy is arrested on February 15, 1978, in Pensacola, Florida. He was convicted of the Chi Omega sorority murders in Florida. He died in the electric chair on January 24, 1989.

== Cast ==
- Chad Michael Murray as Ted Bundy
- Holland Roden as Kathleen McChesney
- Lin Shaye as Mrs. Louise Bundy, Ted Bundy's mother
- Jake Hays as Robert Ressler
- Olivia DeLaurentis as Carol DaRonch
- Diane Franklin as Mrs. Healy
- Marietta Melrose as Karen Chandler
- Greer Grammer as Cheryl Lynch

== Release ==
The film was theatrically released as a one-night showing by Fathom Events.

Redbox released the film on DVD on September 3, 2021.

== Reception ==
Much like Farrands' previous directorial efforts, Ted Bundy: American Boogeyman was panned by critics. On the review aggregator website Rotten Tomatoes, Ted Bundy: American Boogeyman holds a rating of 0%, based on 10 reviews, with an average rating of 3.3/10.

== See also ==
- Aileen Wuornos: American Boogeywoman
