= Daniel Farrands =

American filmmaker (born 1969)

- Born: September 3, 1969 (age 56); Providence, Rhode Island, U.S.
- Occupation: Filmmaker
- Writing career
- Years active: 1993–present
- Notable works: The Haunting in Connecticut; Never Sleep Again: The Elm Street Legacy; Crystal Lake Memories: The Complete History of Friday the 13th; Halloween: The Curse of Michael Myers

Daniel Farrands (born September 3, 1969) is an American filmmaker who specializes in the horror film genre. His first major credit was as screenwriter of Halloween: The Curse of Michael Myers (1995). He has subsequently worked as a producer, writer, and director of both feature and documentary films.

He produced the 2009 horror film The Haunting in Connecticut before directing Never Sleep Again: The Elm Street Legacy (2010), a documentary on the A Nightmare on Elm Street film series. Farrands subsequently wrote, produced and directed Crystal Lake Memories: The Complete History of Friday the 13th (2013), a documentary film on the Friday the 13th film series.

== Biography ==
Farrands was born September 3, 1969, in Providence, Rhode Island, but was raised in Santa Rosa, California, in a "strict Catholic household." Farrands developed an interest in horror films as a child, and became enamored with John Carpenter's Halloween (1978) after seeing it air on television as an NBC "Movie of the Week." He graduated from Santa Rosa High School in 1987 before relocating to Los Angeles to pursue a career in film.

In 1990, Farrands approached Halloween producer Moustapha Akkad with a screenplay for a sixth installment in the Halloween film series. A sixth installment was not considered for production until 1995, after Miramax acquired the rights to the Halloween series, and Farrands was appointed as screenwriter. The film, Halloween: The Curse of Michael Myers (1995), was released in September 1995. Though Farrands wrote the original screenplay, developing subplots that had been obliquely established in Halloween 4: The Return of Michael Myers (1988) and Halloween 5: The Revenge of Michael Myers (1989), the final version of the film released to theaters was significantly altered by Miramax and much of the final act was ghostwritten without Farrands' involvement.

Farrands later wrote the horror film The Tooth Fairy (2006), before serving as producer of The Haunting in Connecticut (2009).

In 2010, Farrands directed Never Sleep Again: The Elm Street Legacy, a documentary on the A Nightmare on Elm Street film series, and subsequently wrote, produced and directed Crystal Lake Memories: The Complete History of Friday the 13th, an expansive documentary film on the Friday the 13th film series.

Farrands' other directorial credits include The Amityville Murders (2018), The Haunting of Sharon Tate, The Murder of Nicole Brown Simpson (both 2019), Ted Bundy: American Boogeyman, and Aileen Wuornos: American Boogeywoman (both 2021).

== Filmography ==
=== Films ===
Year	Title	Director	Writer	Producer	Notes
1993	Rave, Dancing to a Different Beat	No	Yes	No	
1995	Halloween: The Curse of Michael Myers	No	Yes	No	
2006	The Tooth Fairy	No	Yes	Yes	
2007	The Girl Next Door	No	Yes	Associate producer	Also actor
2009	The Haunting in Connecticut	No	No	Yes	
2010	Never Sleep Again: The Elm Street Legacy	Yes	No	Yes	Also archive material provider and music editor
2011	The Trouble with the Truth	No	No	Yes	
2013	Crystal Lake Memories: The Complete History of Friday the 13th	Yes	Yes	Yes	Also archive material provider
2015	The Id	No	No	Yes	
2018	Havenhurst	No	Yes	No	
2017	Amityville: The Awakening	No	No	Yes	
2018	The Amityville Murders	Yes	Yes	Yes	
2019	The Haunting of Sharon Tate	Yes	Yes	Yes	
2019	The Murder of Nicole Brown Simpson	Yes	No	Yes	
2021	Ted Bundy: American Boogeyman	Yes	Yes	Yes	
2021	Aileen Wuornos: American Boogeywoman	Yes	Yes	Yes	

=== Other ===
Year	Title	Role
2006	Halloween: 25 Years of Terror	Documentary; himself and archival material provider
2006	Going to Pieces: The Rise and Fall of the Slasher Film	Documentary; special thanks
2014	The Taking of Deborah Logan	Special thanks
2019	Demon House	Documentary; special thanks

=== Television ===
Year	Show	Credit		Notes
Year	Show	Director	Writer	Notes
2000–2001	History's Mysteries	Yes	Yes	3 episodes: "Amityville: The Haunting"; "Amityville: Horror or Hoax"; "The True Story of Rob Roy" (also co-producer)
2009	His Name Was Jason: 30 Years of Friday the 13th	Yes	No	Producer
2011	Scream: The Inside Story	Yes	No	Also producer
2012	Paranormal Paparazzi	Yes	No	Pilot: "Teen Exorcism Squad"

=== Short films ===
Year	Title	Role
2006	Halloween: The Shape of Horror	Co-producer
2007	The Making of 'The Girl Next Store'	Himself
2009	The Fear is Real: Reinvestigating The Haunting (In Connecticut)	Director, writer, producer
2009	The Crystal Lake Massacres Revisited	Director, writer, producer
2009	Jason's Unlucky Day: 25 Years After Friday the 13th: The Final Chapter	Producer
2009	New Beginnings: The Making of Friday the 13th Part V: A New Beginning	Producer
2009	Jason Lives: The Making of Friday the 13th: Part VI	Producer
2009	Mind Over Matter: The Truth About Telekinesis	Director
2009	Jason's Destroyer: The Making of Friday the 13th Part VII: The New Blood	Director, producer
2009	New York Has a New Problem: The Making of Friday the 13th Part VIII: Jason Takes Manhattan	Writer, producer
2012	The Shadow of October	Dedicatee

=== Accolades ===
Year	Award	Category	Recipient(s)	Result
2019	Hollywood Reel Independent Film Festival Awards	Best Picture	The Haunting of Sharon Tate	Nominated
2019	Hollywood Reel Independent Film Festival Awards	Best Horror Movie	The Haunting of Sharon Tate	Won
2019	Hollywood Reel Independent Film Festival Awards	Best Director	The Haunting of Sharon Tate	Won
2020	Golden Raspberry Awards	Worst Picture	The Haunting of Sharon Tate	Nominated
2020	Golden Raspberry Awards	Worst Screenplay	The Haunting of Sharon Tate	Nominated
2020	Golden Raspberry Awards	Worst Reckless Disregard for Human Life and Public Property	The Haunting of Sharon Tate	Nominated

== See also ==
- Category:Films directed by Daniel Farrands
