= True Crime Zine =

Online magazine

- Editor: Kim Cantrell
- Categories: True crime, literature, books
- Frequency: Weekly
- Publisher: Kim Cantrell
- Founded: 2009
- Final issue: 2013
- Country: US
- Based in: McMinnville, Tennessee
- Language: English
- Website: TrueCrimeZine.com

True Crime Zine was an online magazine that reviews and critiques true-crime and fact-based books. It was also an online crime news aggregator. It was active between 2009 and 2013.

== History ==
The site contained original content about high-profile crime cases and books, updating readers on the cases covered in the books it reviews.

Founded by Kim Cantrell and based in McMinnville, Tennessee, the magazine launched in 2009 as True Crime Book Reviews. In July 2012 it was expanded and renamed True Crime Zine. Before it launched, Cantrell had been a Top Reviewer for Amazon.com.

Forbes' online magazine wrote about Cantrell and True Crime Zine in a May 2012 story. In September 2010, Cantrell appeared on BlogTalkRadio's "True Murder" channel with host Dan Zupansky to discuss her reviews.

In addition to reviewing books, the site featured interviews with true-crime authors and investigative journalists, and its founder appeared on media platforms such as BlogTalkRadio's True Murder podcast to discuss notable crime literature.

== Book awards ==
At the first of each year, the magazine announced the winners of its annual True Crime Awards based on readers' choices and votes. True Crime Zine Best of 2012 named crime writers Kathryn Casey, Ann Rule and Cathy Scott as its Top 3.

The Halifax Reader included True Crime Zine's 2010 Editor's Choice Award in its "Tops in True Crime" yearly review.
