= Chester R. Stackhouse =

American sports coach and college athletics administrator

Biographical details
- Born: August 8, 1905; Nankin, Ohio, U.S.
- Died: June 30, 1978 (aged 72); Turner, Oregon, U.S.

Playing career

Football
- 1927–1928: Central Michigan / Central State

Basketball
- 1927–1929: Central Michigan / Central State

Track
- c. 1928: Central Michigan / Central State
- Position: Center (football)

Coaching career (HC unless noted)

Football
- c. 1930: Saginaw HS (MI)
- 1948: Lincoln (PA)
- 1949–1951: Willamette
- 1952: Stanford (assistant)
- 1953–1954: Slippery Rock

Track
- c. 1930: Saginaw HS (MI)
- 1935–1941: Michigan (assistant)
- 1949–1952: Willamette

Administrative career (AD unless noted)
- 1947–1949: Lincoln (PA)
- 1949–1952: Willamette

Head coaching record
- Overall: 21–29–3 (college football)

Chester Ray "Stack" Stackhouse (August 8, 1905 – June 30, 1978) was an American football and track and field coach and college athletics administrator. He served as the head football coach at Lincoln University in Pennsylvania in 1948, Willamette University from 1949 to 1951, and Slippery Rock State Teachers College—now known as Slippery Rock University of Pennsylvania—from 1953 to 1954, compiling a career college football coaching record of 21–29–3. Stackhouse was an assistant track coach at the University of Michigan from 1935 to 1941. In 1952, he joined the football coaching staff at Stanford University as an assistant under head coach Chuck Taylor.

Stackhouse was born on August 8, 1905, in Nankin, Ohio. He died on June 30, 1978, at his farm in Turner, Oregon. His daughter, Ann Rule, was an author of true crime books.

== Head coaching record ==
=== College football ===
Year	Team	Overall	Conference	Standing	Bowl/playoffs
Lincoln Lions (Colored Intercollegiate Athletic Association) (1948)
1948	Lincoln	6–4	4–2	3rd	
Lincoln:		6–4	4–2		
Willamette Bearcats (Northwest Conference) (1949–1951)
1949	Willamette	3–6	1–4	5th	
1950	Willamette	4–4–2	1–4	T–5th	
1951	Willamette	3–5	1–4	5th	
Willamette:		10–15–2	3–12		
Slippery Rock Rockets (Pennsylvania State Teachers College Conference) (1953–1954)
1953	Slippery Rock	4–3–1	1–2–1	7th	
1954	Slippery Rock	1–7	1–3	11th	
Slippery Rock:		5–10–1	2–5–1		
Total:		21–29–3			
