= True crime =

Nonfiction literary, radio, and film genre

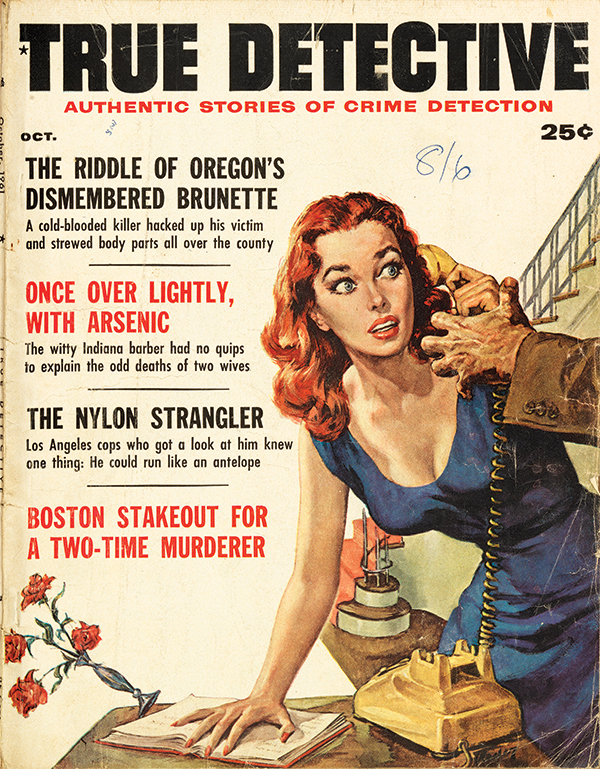
True Detective, one of the first magazines in the true crime genre, started publishing in 1924

True crime is a genre of non-fiction work in which an author examines a crime, including detailing the actions of people associated with and affected by the crime, and investigating the perpetrator's motives. They most commonly document violent crimes such as murders and serial killers, including high-profile cases (such as Ted Bundy, Charles Manson, and the Zodiac Killer), and lesser-known cases that an author wishes to highlight. A true crime work may use either a journalistic style with a focus on known facts, or a speculative style with a larger focus on the author's personal conclusions regarding a crime.

True crime has taken the form of various media, including literature such as magazines and books, television series and documentaries (which may sometimes feature dramatized scenes of the crime based on published accounts), and digital media such as podcasts and internet video. A true crime series may be structured as an anthology of stories focusing on different cases, or cover a single case in a serialized format. True crime podcasts experienced a major growth in popularity in the mid-2010s, with Serial setting listenership records, and the genre as a whole having seen long-term gains in overall listenership. True crime works have been particularly popular among women.

== History ==
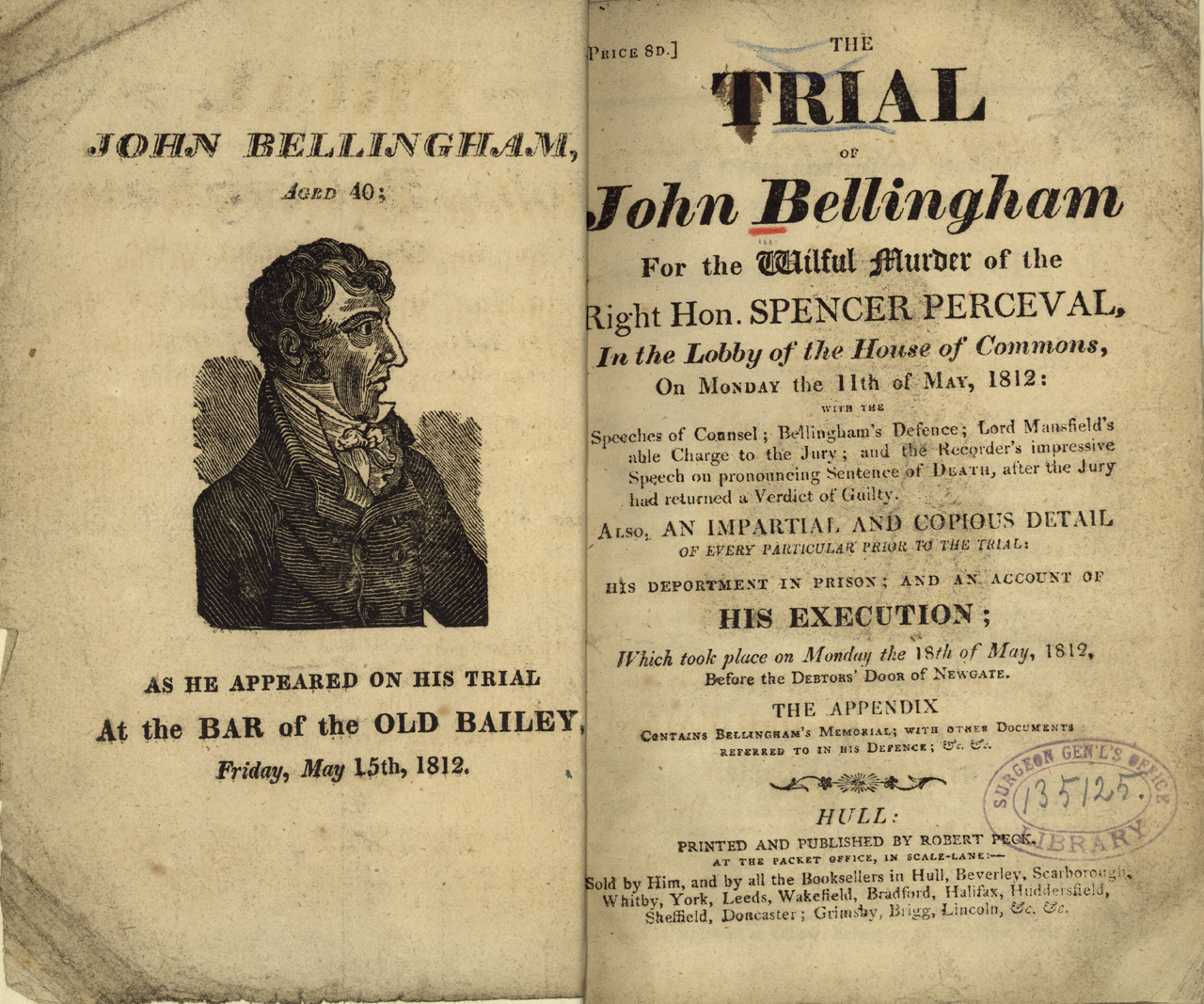
Murder pamphlet, 1812

Zhang Yingyu's The Book of Swindles (c. 1617) is a late Ming dynasty collection of stories about alleged cases of fraud. Works in the related Chinese genre of court case fiction (gong'an xiaoshuo), such as the 16th-century Cases of Magistrate Bao were both fiction and based on actual accounts.

Hundreds of pamphlets, broadsides, chapbooks and other street literature about murders and other crimes were published from 1550 to 1700 in Britain as literacy increased and cheap new printing methods became widespread. They varied in style: some were sensational, while others conveyed a moral message. Most were purchased by the "artisan class and above", as the lower classes did not have the money or time to read them. Ballads were also created, the verses of which were posted on walls around towns, that were told from the perpetrator's point of view in an attempt to understand the psychological motivations of the crime. Such pamphlets remained in circulation in the 19th century in Britain and the United States, even after widespread crime journalism was introduced via the penny press.

In 1807, Henry Tufts published A Narrative of the Life, Adventures, Travels and Sufferings of Henry Tufts, which is likely the first extensive biography of an American criminal. Thomas De Quincey published the essay "On Murder Considered as one of the Fine Arts" in Blackwood's Magazine in 1827, which focused not on the murder or the murderer but on how society views crime. Starting in 1889, Scottish lawyer William Roughead wrote and published essays for six decades about notable British murder trials he attended, with many of these essays collected in the 2000 book Classic Crimes. Many regard Roughead "as the dean of the modern true crime genre".

An American pioneer of the genre was Edmund Pearson, who was influenced in his style of writing about crime by De Quincey. Pearson published a series of books of this type starting with Studies in Murder in 1924 and concluding with More Studies in Murder in 1936. Before being collected in his books, Pearson's true crime stories typically appeared in magazines like Liberty, The New Yorker, and Vanity Fair. Inclusion in these high-class magazines distinguished Pearson's crime narratives from those found in the penny press. The foreword of a 1964 anthology of Pearson's stories contains an early mention of the term "true crime" as a genre. Truman Capote's "non-fiction novel" In Cold Blood (1965) is usually credited with establishing the modern novelistic style of the genre and the one that rocketed it to great profitability.

== Forms ==
=== Magazines ===
The first true crime magazine, True Detective, was published in 1924. It featured fairly matter-of-fact accounts of crimes and how they were solved. During the genre's heyday, before World War II, 200 different true crime magazines were sold on newsstands, with six million magazines sold every month. By itself, True Detective had two million in circulation. The covers of the magazines generally featured women being menaced in some way by a potential criminal perpetrator, with the scenarios being more intense in the 1960s. Public interest in the magazines began declining in the 1970s, and by 1996, almost none were being published, including True Detective, which had been bought and shut down by a new owner.

=== Books ===
True crime books often center on sensational, shocking, or strange events, particularly murder. Even though murder makes up less than 20% of reported crime, it is present in most true crime stories. Typically, the crimes most commonly include murder; about 40 percent focus on tales of serial killers. Serial killers have been a highly profitable sub-genre. An informal survey conducted by Publishers Weekly in 1993 concluded that the more popular true crime books focus on serial killers, with the more gruesome and grotesque content performing even better.

Some true crime works are "instant books" produced quickly to capitalize on popular demand; these have been described as "more than formulaic" and hyper-conventional. Others may reflect years of thoughtful research and inquiry and may have considerable literary merit. A milestone of the genre was Norman Mailer's The Executioner's Song (1979), which was the first book in the genre to win a Pulitzer Prize.

Other prominent true crime accounts include Truman Capote's In Cold Blood; Zodiac about the Zodiac killer, the best-selling true crime book of all time, Helter Skelter, by the lead Manson family prosecutor Vincent Bugliosi and Curt Gentry; and Ann Rule's The Stranger Beside Me, about Ted Bundy. Rule wrote her second book in 1983, titled Lust Killer, it narrates the story of serial killer Jerry Brudos, who murdered and mutilated four young women in Salem, Oregon, in the 1960s. Rule's 1987 work, Small Sacrifices, tells the story of Diane Downs, an Oregon woman who in May 1983 murdered her daughter and attempted to murder her other two children. An example of a modern true crime book is I'll Be Gone in the Dark by Michelle McNamara. Erik Larson's The Devil in the White City gives a novelistic account of H. H. Holmes' operations during the 1893 World's Fair.

In 2006, Associated Content stated that since the start of the 21st century, the genre of writing that was growing the quickest was true crime. Much of this is due to the ease of recycling materials and the publication of numerous volumes by the same authors differing only by minor updates. The majority of readers of true crime books are women.

=== Films and television ===
True crime documentaries have been a growing medium in the last several decades. One of the most influential documentaries in this process was The Thin Blue Line (1988), directed by Errol Morris. This documentary, among others, feature reenactments, although other documentary filmmakers choose not to use them since they do not show the truth.

In the early 1990s, a boom of true crime films began in Hong Kong. These films ranged from graphic Category III–rated films such as The Untold Story and Dr. Lamb (based on serial killers Wong Chi Hang and Lam Kor-wan, respectively) to more general audience fare such as the film Crime Story (based on the kidnapping of businessman Teddy Wang Tei-huei), which featured action star Jackie Chan.

Multiple cable networks in the United States focus predominantly on true crime, including Investigation Discovery, and Oxygen—a network that originally aired a generalist format targeting women, but pivoted entirely to true crime and police procedurals in 2017 amid the success of series such as Snapped among its target demographic. An earlier example—Court TV—featured a mix of true crime-oriented programming (such as Forensic Files), as well as a daytime news block featuring coverage of legal news and jury trials. The channel later shifted to primarily airing reality television programming, and then relaunched as the more generalized TruTV in 2008.

Turner Broadcasting later syndicated some of Court TV's library to the digital multicast television network Justice Network (which itself rebranded as "True Crime Network" in 2022). In 2018, the rights to the Court TV brand and much of its library was sold to the E. W. Scripps Company, who subsequently relaunched the Court TV brand as a digital television network.

Streaming services have also carried true crime programming; Netflix experienced success with its 2015 series Making a Murderer, leading the service to make further investments into the genre to ride off its popularity.

==== Other prominent documentaries ====
- Paradise Lost: The Child Murders at Robin Hood Hills (1996)
- Making a Murderer
- The Jinx
- The Sons of Sam: A Descent Into Darkness
- The Keepers
- Don't F**k with Cats: Hunting an Internet Killer
- Evil Genius

=== Podcasts ===
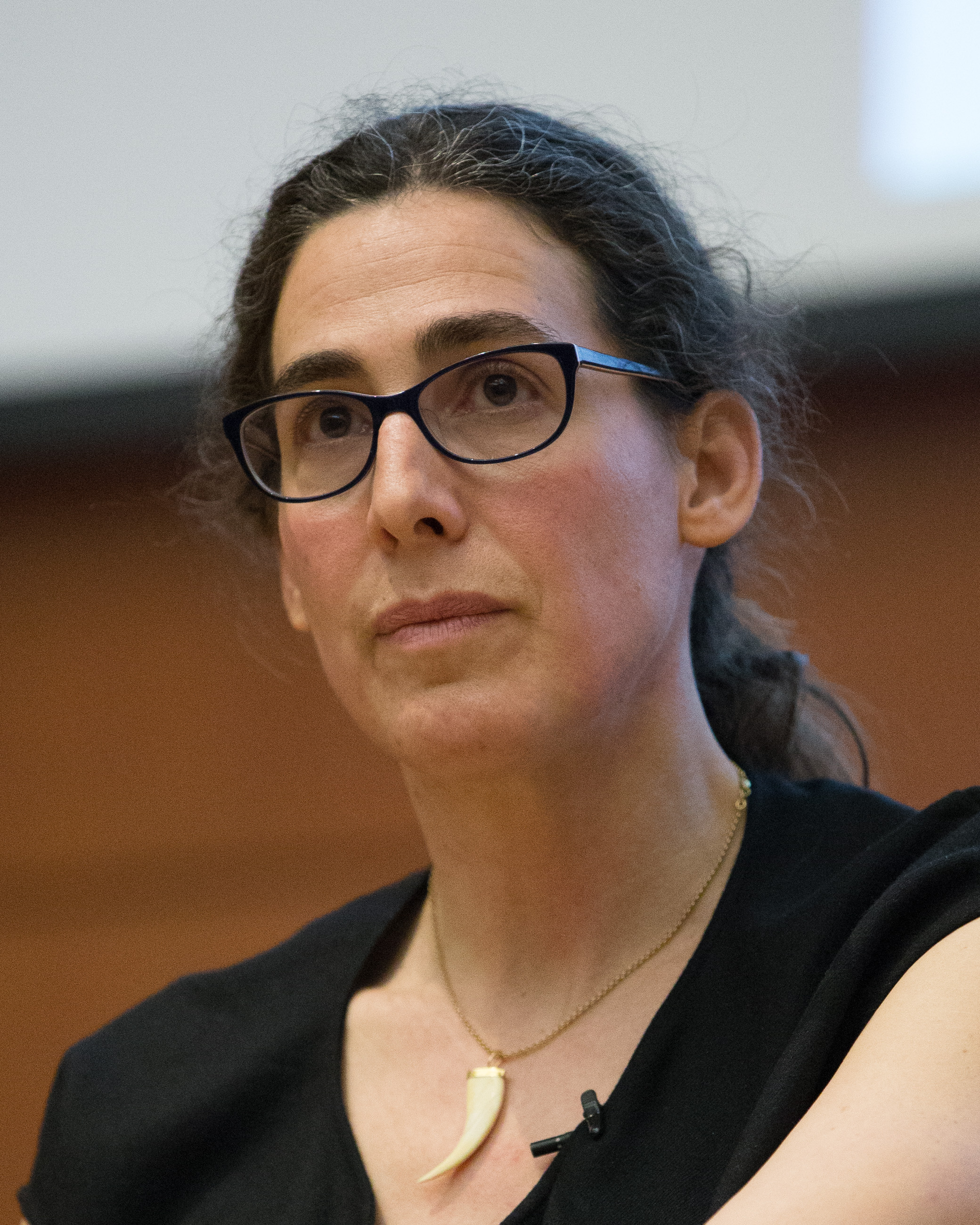
Serial host and producer Sarah Koenig

Podcasts with a true crime theme are a recent trend. The 2014 true crime podcast Serial broke podcasting records when it achieved 5 million downloads on iTunes quicker than any previous podcast. As of September 2018, it had been downloaded more than 340 million times. Other notable true crime podcasts have included Criminal, Dirty John, My Favorite Murder, Someone Knows Something, and Up and Vanished among others.

Podcasts have now expanded to more platforms, such as Spotify, Apple Music, YouTube and others. Spotify has an expanding number of true crime podcasts with Rotten Mango, Conviction American Panic, Bed of Lies, Catch & Kill among many more. This genre has been on the rise as psychologist, Amanda Vicary, said her report found "women were most drawn to true crime stories that gave them tips for spotting danger and staying alive". Apple Podcasts added a dedicated "True Crime" category in 2019, and until then the podcasts that would be moved into the section had existed across many other categories, such as History, News & Politics, and even Comedy.

It has been speculated that fear could play a role in the popularity of true crime podcasts. These podcasts often recount horrific crimes, which triggers the fear response and the release of adrenaline in the body. Due to the possibility of binge-watching podcasts, adrenaline rushes can be experienced in quick bursts. Another explanation for the popularity of true crime podcasts is due to the serialized nature of crime, in which events happen one after another. Podcasts that explore a crime episodically can utilize this aspect in their storytelling. Another strength of these podcasts is use of typical sensationalist techniques, such as inclusion of direct dialogue and focus on victims and their families. Podcasts can use music or other sound cues to maximize the intended impact or shock value of a fact, as seen in Serial.

==== Trends in the United States ====
In the U.S. women are predominantly the consumers of digital true crime podcasts, in 2019 making up around 73% of the content audience. The 2019 Edison Research Report found that at the time of data collection, an estimated 90 million of the U.S. population older than 12 had listened to a podcast in the last month, and of those polled, around 28% were interested in true crime as a topic to listen to in a podcast.

In 2020, true crime podcasts held many of the U.S. top 50 spots for popularity by most listens, with Crime Junkie at No. 3, My Favorite Murder at No. 5, and others scattered among the top 50, such as; Serial at No. 13, Dateline NBC at No. 22, and Criminal at No. 30. In that year, true crime ranked third overall for genres by listen behind both comedy and news. From November 2019 through May 2022, true crime podcast listening increased the most of the top three genres by percentage gain in listeners, with a 66% gain (from ~12.9 million to ~21.5 million) in current listeners, versus the 44% and 37% gain in listeners by comedy and news respectively.

On Apple Podcasts, True Crime podcasts make up just less than half a percent of the total number of podcasts on the platform. On a collated list of 432 podcasts from the most-visited results of a search for "Top Podcasts of 2021", true crime podcasts made up more than 20% of the podcasts constituting the lists.

==== Trends in Australia ====
In 2017, as many as 30% of podcast listeners had listened to true crime podcasts, and in 2019, this had increased to up to 44%.

== Impact ==
True crime works can impact the crimes they cover and the audience who consumes it. Also, coverage of true crime events can have a direct effect on the aftermath of the crime and how it is dealt with by authorities or a given community. The Netflix show Making A Murderer has had a range of real-life effects, ranging from the show being shown in law schools as instructional material to increased mistrust in criminal investigators. The investigative process of the true crime genre can lead to changes in the cases being covered, such as when Robert Durst seemingly confessed to murder in the documentary The Jinx and was arrested.

A study conducted in 2011, in Nebraska, showed that consuming non-fiction crime shows is correlated with an increased fear of being a victim of crime. As the frequency of watching true crime shows increased, support for the death penalty increased, while support for the criminal justice system decreased. In Australia, the amount of reports given to the crime reporting network Crime Stoppers Australia that led to charges being pressed doubled from 2012 to 2017. This increased interest in crime is attributed to popular true crime podcasts.

The true crime genre has been criticized as being disrespectful to crime victims and their families and is described by some as trash culture. Author Jack Miles believes this genre has a high potential to cause harm and mental trauma to the real people involved. True crime media can be produced without the consent of the victim's family, which can lead to them being re-traumatized. Recent discussions about the consumption of true crime media have also focused on the impact on the audience's mental health. "Loch Henry"—a 2023 episode of the Netflix anthology series Black Mirror—was an exploration and indictment of the commercial popularity of true crime, with creator Charlie Brooker stating that it was intended as a commentary on turning "horrible things" into "a sumptuous form of entertainment". Another way in which true crime has been criticized, is in the case where glorification or romanticization of the perpetrator occurs. Non-participatory members will start to feel empathy for the criminal rather than the victim.

Depending on the writer, true crime can adhere strictly to well-established facts in journalistic fashion or can be highly speculative. Writers can selectively choose which information to present and which to leave out in order to support their narrative. Artists have offered fact-based narratives blending fiction and historical reenactment. Author Christiana Gregoriou analyzed several books of the genre and concluded that tabloidization and fictionalization are pervasive in the works of some of the authors of true crime literature. In some cases, even books by the same author disagree on specifics about the same killer or events. For instance, some facts reported in Capote's In Cold Blood were challenged in 2013. Capote's second attempt at a true crime book, Handcarved Coffins (1979), despite being subtitled "Nonfiction Account of an American Crime", was already noted for containing significant fictional elements. Studies found various groups over- and under-represented among victims and offenders in true crime compared to crime statistics.

== See also ==
- Cold case – Unsolved crime not now being investigated
- Correlates of crime – Things associated with unlawful behavior
- Crime fiction – Literary genre
- Detective fiction – Subgenre of crime and mystery fiction
- Film noir – Crime films with cynical atmosphere
- Fear of crime – Fear of being a victim of crime
- Pulp magazine – Fiction magazines made from 1896 to the 1950s
