= Leslie Rule =

American novelist and paranormal non-fiction author

- Born: February 25, 1958 (age 68); Seattle, Washington, U.S.
- Occupations: Novelist, non-fiction author
- Spouse(s): Kevin Wagner (divorced) Glenn Scott (m. 2011)
- Relatives: Ann Rule (mother)
- Writing career
- Genres: Paranormal, thriller
- Notable works: Ghosts Among Us; Kill Me Again

Leslie Rule (born February 25, 1958) is an American novelist, paranormal non-fiction author, magazine writer, photographer, and the daughter of true crime author Ann Rule.

At age 14, her mother introduced her to a serial killer.

== Career ==
She was a contributing writer for Woman's World magazine from 1992 to 1994. She also wrote for Reader's Digest.

Rule became interested in the study of ghosts while growing up in what was known to locals as a "haunted house" located on a Native American burial ground on Puget Sound. She has written five non-fiction books featuring paranormal stories, based on historical research and interviews of people who say they've witnessed ghost sightings. The Erie Times-News described her second paranormal book, Ghosts Among Us, as "stories of eerie visitations and paranormal experiences." She has also written two novels and a travel book.

In October 2001, the St. Petersburg Times covered Rule's visit to Don CeSar Beach Resort and Spa in St. Pete Beach, Florida, where the spirits of Thomas Rowe, builder of the 1928 resort, and his lover, Lucinda, according to locals, periodically appear. When her book Coast to Coast Ghosts was released in 2001, The Advocate in Baton Rouge, Louisiana wrote that "Rule, daughter of true-crime writer Ann Rule, may have found her calling" in writing about ghosts.

Upon the release of her seventh book, Ghost in the Mirror, The News Tribune wrote, "Leslie remembers sneaking a peek in her mother's grisly files that chronicled the lives of notorious murderers. So it's no wonder that Leslie Rule, 50, grew up with a yen to write about something creepy."

An animal rights advocate, Rule featured the story of an aging boxer named Roxy in her eighth book, Where Angels Tread: Real Stories of Miracles and Angelic Intervention, released by Andrews McMeel Publishing in 2011.

Rule's second novel, Kill Me Again, made Crown Books' bestseller list the week of its release in September 1996.

== Bibliography ==
=== Novels ===
- Whispers from the Grave (1995) (ISBN 978-0425147771)
- Kill Me Again (1996) (ISBN 978-0515119398)

=== Non-fiction ===
- Beautiful Americas: Portland (1988) (ISBN 978-0898025354)
- Coast to Coast Ghosts: True Stories of Hauntings Across America (2001), (ISBN 0740718665)
- Ghosts Among Us: True Stories of Spirit Encounters (2004) (ISBN 978-0740747175)
- When the Ghost Screams: True Stories of Victims Who Haunt (2006) (ISBN 978-0740761751)
- Ghost in the Mirror: Real Cases of Spirit Encounters (2008) (ISBN 978-0740773853)
- Where Angels Tread: Real Stories of Miracles and Angelic Intervention (2011) (ISBN 978-1449407735)
- “A Tangled Web: A Cyberstalker, A Deadly Obsession, and the Twisting Path to Justice” (2020) (ISBN 978-0806539973)
