= Jerry Brudos =

American serial killer (1939–2006)

- Brudos, c. 1968
- Born: Jerome Henry Brudos; January 31, 1939; Webster, South Dakota, U.S.
- Died: March 28, 2006 (aged 67); Salem, Oregon, U.S.
- Other names: The Lust Killer; The Shoe Fetish Slayer
- Motive: Lust; Domination; Possession
- Conviction: Life imprisonment (×3)

Details
- Victims: 4
- Span of crimes: January 26, 1968 – April 23, 1969
- Country: United States
- State: Oregon
- Date apprehended: May 29, 1969

Jerome Henry "Jerry" Brudos (January 31, 1939 – March 28, 2006) was an American serial killer and necrophile known as the Lust Killer and the Shoe Fetish Slayer who committed the kidnap, rape, and murder of four young women between 1968 and 1969 in Salem, Oregon. He is also known to have attempted to abduct two other young women.

All of Brudos's murders were committed inside either his car or the basement or the garage workshop of the two homes in which he resided during the period he committed his murders. Each victim was killed by strangulation; several victims were photographed before and/or after death, and three of his victims underwent post-mortem dismemberment. Brudos is known to have engaged in acts of necrophilia with his victims' bodies and to have retained selective body parts — invariably the severed breasts or feet — of three of his victims to both demonstrate his domination and to satiate his sexual fetish for women's feet, lingerie, and shoes.

Sentenced to three consecutive terms of life imprisonment, to be served at Oregon State Penitentiary, Brudos died of liver cancer while incarcerated at this facility in 2006.

Brudos became known as the "Lust Killer" due to the primal motive behind his crimes; he also became known as the "Shoe Fetish Slayer" due to his lifelong shoe fetishism.

== Early life ==
=== Childhood ===
Jerome Henry Brudos was born in Webster, South Dakota, on January 31, 1939, the younger of two sons born to Marie Eileen (née Alldridge) and Henry Ervin Brudos. His mother had wanted her second child to be a girl and was very displeased that she instead gave birth to another son; she would frequently emotionally abuse and belittle her younger son, making no secret of the fact to Brudos she had wanted a daughter as opposed to another son. By contrast, Brudos's mother doted on her older son, James.

The Brudos family lived a modest and pious lifestyle; Brudos's father typically held casual and often seasonal employment, while his mother was a homemaker. Although Henry was a short-tempered individual, he was seldom physically abusive toward or emotionally critical of his children, whereas Marie was a harsh, matriarchal and prudish individual who reserved the majority of her denigration for her younger son. As a direct result of his lacking of maternal acceptance, as a young child, Brudos formed a close friendship with a neighborhood woman of a similar age to his mother. This individual was both compassionate toward and accepting of him throughout his visits and Brudos later confessed to occasionally fantasizing she was his true mother; however, the woman suffered from diabetes and her declining health forced her to disallow visits from him or other neighborhood children. Shortly thereafter, a female friend his age died of tuberculosis, leaving Brudos inconsolable.

Brudos was an unremarkable and sickly child with few friends who frequently complained of throat pains and migraines; he typically achieved average grades, as opposed to his academically achieving and popular brother. In high school, Brudos remained an unremarkable individual to his peers and teachers alike. He seldom engaged in extracurricular activities, although he is known to have been the secretary-treasurer of a youth club in his early teens.

Largely due to Henry Brudos's seasonal work, the family frequently moved home—typically around the Pacific Northwest—throughout Brudos's childhood before permanently settling in Salem, Oregon. This property was also located upon farmland.

=== Fetishisms ===
Brudos harbored a lifelong shoe and foot fetish; he later recollected his fascination for women's shoes and feet sourced from an incident when he, aged approximately five years, observed the teenage daughter of a family friend lying asleep on his bed, having been allowed to do so by Brudos's parents after she complained of feeling unwell. According to Brudos, he was "transfixed" by the sight of the girl's high-heeled shoes and attempted to pry them off her feet; the girl awoke and simply told him to leave the room. On another occasion at age five, Brudos discovered a pair of leather high-heeled shoes with a rhinestone-studded clasp while exploring a local junkyard. Brudos took these shoes home, then slipped them on his feet to show his mother. In response, Brudos's mother shrieked he was "wicked" and ordered him to remove the shoes and return them to the junkyard. Upon learning her son had secretly retained the footwear and that he frequently secretly wore them, Brudos's mother severely beat him before burning the shoes in his presence.

Two years after this incident, Brudos attempted to steal the high-heeled shoes of his first grade teacher; when caught, Brudos confessed to his actions, although when asked why, he claimed not to know why he had attempted to steal the footwear. By the onset of puberty, Brudos had also developed a fetish for women's underwear and lingerie. According to Brudos, he was introduced to the practice of viewing, fondling and smelling female underwear by a neighborhood boy with several older sisters and with whom he occasionally sneaked into the girls' bedrooms to perform these acts, which invoked deep erotic feelings within him which he initially failed to understand. As a teenager, Brudos would opportunistically steal underwear from female neighbors, some of which he would later wear.

=== Puberty ===
By the onset of puberty, Brudos had still not learned of the act of sexual intercourse, although he became obsessed with viewing a naked female peer; however, he was markedly shy around girls in his neighborhood and at school. Moreover, his height and severe acne further decreased his confidence in his ability to appeal to girls. By approximately 1953, Brudos—still oblivious to the act of intercourse—had begun to masturbate. He later claimed to fail to ejaculate during the act of masturbation as a teenager, although he frequently experienced wet dreams. Whenever his mother discovered semen stains on his bed sheet, he was punished and forced to wash his own sheets.

== First offenses ==
Brudos began stalking local women in his early teens—several of whom he discreetly photographed. He also stole and retained numerous items of lingerie and footwear. However, none of these initial offenses were violent in nature, although by his mid-teens he had begun developing violent fantasies of forcibly possessing a woman.

At the age of sixteen, Brudos dug an underground tunnel and alcove close to his family home to symbolically enact his developing fantasies regarding captive women. He spent numerous hours within this lair, hoping to entrap a captive. (Note: According to Brudos, he still had only a basic knowledge of sexual intercourse at the time he constructed this tunnel, and his purpose in constructing the lair was not to rape his captive—he simply wished to possess a young female.) Although no women were confined at this location, Brudos did lure a neighborhood girl to his bedroom under innocuous pretences to facilitate his sexual fantasies at age sixteen. Shortly after luring the girl, Brudos exited the bedroom, only to reappear minutes later wearing a mask and brandishing a knife. He forced the girl to strip naked and took several photographs of her before fleeing. Minutes later, Brudos reappeared wearing his original shirt, with his hair in disarray and with a minor scuff mark on his cheek, claiming the intruder had locked him in the family barn at knifepoint.

Within a year of this first known violent offense, Brudos had established a pattern of abducting girls his own age or younger—typically at knifepoint—and forcing them into a barn upon his family farm before ordering them to disrobe and photographing them. He would then lock these girls in a corn crib before reappearing several minutes later, wearing different clothing and with his hair combed in a different fashion. He would then release the girl, explaining he was "Ed, Jerry's twin brother" and feign shock at her account of her ordeal before asking, "He didn't hurt you, did he?" Brudos would then claim his twin brother "Jerry" was "in therapy. This is going to set him back a bit" before pleading with the girl not to inform anyone of her ordeal and promising to locate and destroy the camera "Jerry" had used. None of these girls were subjected to physical sexual assaults beyond tentative fondling, but—likely as a defence mechanism—none are known to have informed authorities of these experiences.

=== Arrest ===
On one occasion in April 1956, Brudos persuaded a 17-year-old girl to accompany him on a date. Upon driving the girl to a deserted road, he ordered her to undress. However, the girl refused, whereupon Brudos dragged her from his car and proceeded to beat her, breaking her nose. The girl's screams and the general altercation attracted the attention of a young couple driving by, who stopped and intervened. Brudos lamely claimed the girl had fallen from the car before changing his story to claim the hysterical girl had been attacked by "some weirdo" he had overpowered. His story was not believed, and the couple drove the two to the nearest police station, where Brudos admitted attacking the girl but claimed that his intention had been to simply intimidate her into removing her clothes in order that he could photograph her. He denied having ever committed any previous acts of this nature and insisted his temper had simply gotten the better of him.

Arrested upon charges of assault and battery, a subsequent search of Brudos's bedroom revealed his extensive collection of female clothing plus numerous Polaroid photographs of teenage girls, one of whom they were able to identify. The girl was contacted, and revealed her ordeal at the hands of "Ed's twin brother" the previous August. Brudos was remanded in custody, to be referred to the Polk County Juvenile Department.

=== Psychiatric evaluation ===
Brudos was treated as a juvenile offender and sent to undergo psychiatric evaluations within the Oregon State Hospital. He entered this facility on April 16, 1956, where he remained for nine months while permitted to leave the facility to attend high school. While at this facility, Brudos was subjected to a range of evaluations; these tests concluded he was a depressive individual who suffered from a schizotypal personality disorder but was not grossly mentally ill or suffering from delusions. Furthermore, the doctors at this facility concluded Brudos's sexual fantasies revolved around a hatred he harbored toward his mother and women in general.

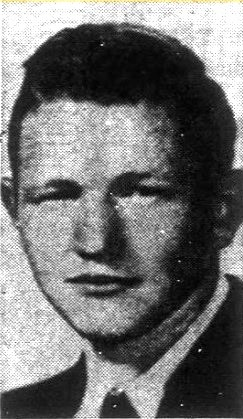
Brudos, pictured in 1958, approximately one year after his release from the Oregon State Hospital

== Release ==
Upon completion of his evaluations, Brudos returned to live with his parents. An average scholar, he graduated 142nd out of a class of 202 students from Corvallis High School in 1957. Two years later, in March 1959, Brudos joined the army, where he trained as a communications technician. Although he became highly skilled in this profession, his military service was largely unremarkable and he gained a reputation among his fellow soldiers as something of a fantasist who repeatedly claimed to be in a casual sexual relationship with a "beautiful Korean girl" whom, he stated, would sneak into his bed every evening.

Brudos was discharged from the army in October 1959, having been classified as psychologically unfit for military service. He moved back into his parents' two-bedroom home in Corvallis, Oregon, and soon found employment at a local radio station as an electrical engineer. To his colleagues, Brudos was an eminent, proficient and conscientious employee who conveyed a mild-mannered demeanor, yet seemed to lack any ambition to advance himself despite being a licensed broadcast technician.

Throughout the years Brudos resided with his parents, his mother allowed him to sleep in the second bedroom while his older brother was at college; when his brother returned home, he was forced to sleep in a shed at the rear of the property.

=== Further offenses ===
On one occasion in approximately 1960, Brudos observed a young woman wearing revealing clothing; he discreetly followed this woman to her Salem apartment, where he strangled her into a semi-conscious state before fleeing with her shoes. This woman was not raped. Shortly thereafter, Brudos observed another attractive young woman wearing high-heeled shoes. He attempted to overpower and strangle this woman; however, this individual fought back, and Brudos fled the scene with only one of her shoes. He retained the footwear of both women in the shed—frequently sleeping with the attire. Brudos was not arrested for either of these offenses.

== Marriage ==
Approximately one year after gaining employment at the Corvallis radio station, Brudos became acquainted with a 17-year-old girl named Ralphene Schwinler. He became acquainted with Schwinler via a teenage boy who—being an amateur electronics enthusiast—frequently visited the radio station to observe and question Brudos as to aspects of his work and who had jokingly remarked about his shyness around female employees. According to Brudos, he had jokingly remarked to the youth to find him a girlfriend; to his surprise, the teenager agreed and took him to Schwinler's home.

On September 30, 1961, Brudos and Schwinler—one month pregnant at the time—married. The newlyweds initially resided in Portland, Oregon, before relocating to a small house in a suburb of Salem in the summer of 1968. Their marriage ultimately produced two children: a daughter, Theresa (b. 1962) and a son, Brian (b. 1967). To supplement the family income, Brudos occasionally repaired vehicles in the family garage.

Brudos was never physically or emotionally abusive towards his wife, although in the early years of their marriage he insisted she frequently walk around the house and perform housework naked save for a pair of high-heeled shoes, often as he photographed her before engaging in intercourse. For several years, his wife acquiesced to these proclivities, and Brudos is not known to have committed any sexual offenses during the early years of their marriage.

=== Recidivism ===
By the mid-1960s, Theresa Brudos was a toddler—thus demanding more physical attention and nurturing from her mother. Accordingly, Ralphene had begun to refuse to participate in the nude household high-heel modeling, photography and sexual rituals should her daughter view her parents. Furthermore, Brudos had begun putting on weight; his wife would later state that, although she never informed her husband, his physical appearance had begun to repel her. Although Ralphene remained loyal to her husband, the two engaged in intercourse increasingly infrequently, with Ralphene devoting more of her time to her daughter and social activities with female friends, and Brudos spending increasing amounts of time either working about the house or in his garage workshop, focusing on various electronics projects.

In May 1967, as his wife was in hospital giving birth to their second child, Brudos discreetly followed a young woman wearing attractive high-heeled shoes to her home; he waited until nightfall before entering her apartment, whereupon he proceeded to choke her into unconsciousness.

Brudos would later state his intentions upon entering this household did not initially include rape, but that the sight of a young, attractive woman lying limp and at his mercy beneath him aroused him to such a degree that he did rape her unconscious body before fleeing from her apartment with her high-heeled shoes. The following year, Brudos was arrested by Corvallis police while on the grounds of an Oregon State University women's dormitory. He was charged with stealing women's clothing, and was wearing pedal pushers, high-heeled shoes and women's underwear at the time of this arrest.

== Murders ==
Between 1968 and 1969, Brudos abducted and strangled four young women and attempted to abduct a minimum of two others. Three victims were murdered in the basement or garage workshop of Brudos's home, and one inside his vehicle.

All of Brudos's victims were abducted and murdered in order to satisfy his need to both dominate and possess attractive young women and to satiate his sexual fetishes. Following the act of murder, each victim was subjected to a ritual of dressing in differing lingerie and footwear during which Brudos would arrange her body in suggestive and provocative positions prior to photographing her body and engaging in masturbation—often while staring at and/or caressing the victim's feet and ankles after dressing the body in differing lingerie and footwear. Each victim was also subjected to acts of necrophilia and three were mutilated after death, with Brudos retaining the severed body parts to fuel his fetishes in addition to expressing his dominance. All were disposed of in the Willamette River, although their shoes and underwear were retained and stowed within the household garage, which Brudos's wife and children were forbidden from entering without first announcing their intention via an intercom he had installed. (Note: Brudos's justifications to his wife for forbidding his family from entering the garage workshop were that his Polaroid photographs were developed in this location and he did not wish the photographic development process to be compromised in addition to the tools of his mechanical and engineering occupations being a safety hazard for his family.)

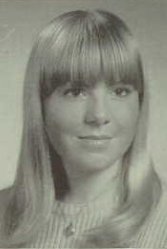
Linda Slawson

=== Linda Katherine Slawson ===
Slawson was a 19-year-old door-to-door encyclopedia saleswoman from Aloha, Oregon, whom Brudos encountered as he worked in his yard on January 26, 1968. She inadvertently entered his property, having confused his address with a neighbor's, believing she had an appointment with the homeowner to potentially sell an encyclopedia. Upon hearing the reason for Slawson's visit, (Note: Slawson had begun selling encyclopedias door to door following her 1967 high school graduation in order to fund her college education.) Brudos feigned interest in purchasing a set of encyclopedias to lure her to the basement of his home. As Slawson sat on a stool and began advocating the sale of her encyclopedias, Brudos bludgeoned her about the head with a section of wood, then manually strangled her to death before concealing her body beneath the staircase to the basement. He then asked his mother to take his daughter from the house to purchase hamburgers so that he could engage in necrophilia with Slawson's body.

Upon undressing the young woman's body, Brudos discovered Slawson was wearing attractive red lingerie; this inspired him to retrieve a box of women's underwear and footwear he had accumulated, typically via theft, and repeatedly dress and redress her body in differing footwear and lingerie in addition to engaging in repeated acts of necrophilia—photographing much of the process. Hours later, Brudos severed Slawson's left foot from her body with a hacksaw; he retained this severed appendage in the rear of the family freezer (located in the basement) to use to showcase his extensive collection of high-heeled shoes and to fuel his masturbatory fantasies. He also retained the two encyclopedias Slawson had hoped to sell him as keepsakes.

Brudos later bound the remainder of Slawson's body to a heavy cylinder head and discarded her body "over a rail somewhere" in Marion County, adding he could not recall the precise location. (Note: Slawson's body was never found.)

=== Jan Susan Whitney ===
Brudos encountered Whitney, a 23-year-old motorist, as he drove home from a job in Lebanon, Oregon, on November 26, 1968. Brudos later insisted this murder—much like Slawson's—was a crime of opportunity; he had simply encountered Whitney as he drove home from work and observed three individuals standing beside a broken-down Rambler alongside Interstate 5 between Salem and Albany.

After inspecting Whitney's car, Brudos claimed he could fix her vehicle, but would need to drive her to his home to collect the necessary tools. Whitney and her traveling companions—hitchhikers she had previously picked up—agreed to accompany him, upon the promise the two hitchhikers would first be driven to their intended destination. The two hitchhikers entered the rear of Brudos's vehicle, and Whitney the passenger seat.

After driving the two hitchhikers to their intended destination, Brudos drove Whitney to his home, which he then entered while remaining parked in the driveway—ostensibly to retrieve the necessary tools to repair Whitney's car. Brudos then discreetly entered the rear of the vehicle as Whitney remained seated in the passenger seat; he then asked her to close her eyes and describe how to tie a shoelace without opening her eyes or moving her hands. Whitney agreed to the challenge; Brudos then strangled her from behind with a leather luggage strap before raping her body inside the vehicle. He then carried her body into his garage workshop where he dressed her body in differing footwear and lingerie before repeatedly engaging in acts of necrophilia with her corpse.

Whitney's body was left hoisted from the pulley in the workshop ceiling for two days, with Brudos later admitting to violating her body whenever he "felt the need". Her body was also dressed in differing lingerie and repeatedly photographed. Brudos also severed one of her breasts to cast and use as a paperweight, although this idea was abandoned when he noted the epoxy hardener failed to fully set. Brudos instead stuffed the breast with sawdust before pinning the organ to a wooden board.

According to Brudos, two days after Whitney's murder, a car crashed into his garage, knocking a hole in the wall. A responding policeman had looked into the resultant damage, but due to the dust, debris and darkness and the fact the hole was at ground level, failed to observe Whitney's mutilated and suspended body. That evening, her body was tethered to a section of scrap railroad iron and thrown into the Willamette River along with Slawson's severed foot, which had by this stage begun to decompose.

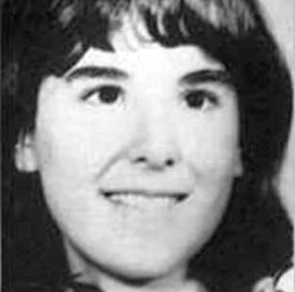
Karen Sprinker

=== Karen Elena Sprinker ===
Sprinker was an 18-year-old Oregon State University chemistry student abducted at gunpoint from a parking lot outside a Meier & Frank department store while en route to meet her mother for lunch on March 27, 1969. Brudos—dressed in women's clothing at the time of this abduction (Note: Subsequent police inquiries revealed a man dressed in female clothing had been seen loitering in the vicinity of the department store parking lot on the morning of Sprinker's disappearance. Brudos would later confess to being this individual.)—had impulsively driven his station wagon into the parking lot after observing a young woman wearing high-heeled shoes and a miniskirt at this location. Having parked his car and attempted to chase this individual, Brudos soon lost sight of her. En route back to his vehicle, he observed Sprinker exiting her car and walking toward the department store. She was forced at gunpoint to enter his vehicle and accompany him to his home, with Brudos promising not to harm her. (Note: Brudos's wife and children were not present in the family home on this date.)

According to Brudos, Sprinker repeatedly pleaded with him not to hurt her, adding that once taken inside his workshop she stated she would do anything he wanted provided he did not kill her. In response, Brudos asked if she was a virgin; Sprinker replied she was, adding she was having her period. Brudos then forced her to undress before proceeding to rape her on the workshop floor. Sprinker was then forced to pose in differing high-heeled shoes and underwear as Brudos photographed her.

Brudos then bound Sprinker's hands behind her back before placing a rope around her neck. He then asked her if the rope was too tight; Sprinker replied that it was. In response, he threw the rope over a ceiling beam and pulled, causing Sprinker to be winched from the ground, whereupon she "kicked a little and died".

Over the following hours, Brudos repeatedly engaged in acts of necrophilia with Sprinker's body; he also severed her breasts so he could form plastic molds with the organs. That evening, Sprinker's body was lashed to a six-cylinder engine component and thrown into the Willamette River.

==== Attempted abductions ====
In April 1969, Brudos attempted to abduct two young women on consecutive days. Both escaped and reported their ordeal to authorities. The first of these women, 24-year-old motorist Sharon Wood, encountered Brudos in the basement stairwell of a parking garage in Portland on April 21, 1969. Wood later recalled feeling a tapping motion on her shoulder, only to turn around to observe Brudos pointing a pistol at her face and ordering her not to scream.

Although Brudos attempted to restrain the young woman with an armlock, Wood fiercely fought her assailant by both biting and kicking him and twisting his wrist as she attempted to divert the pistol muzzle away from herself and toward her attacker while simultaneously biting deeply into Brudos's hand, causing him to slam her head into the concrete floor before fleeing the scene.

The following day, a 15-year-old schoolgirl, Gloria Jean Smith, was forced at gunpoint to accompany Brudos to a green Volkswagen Karmann Ghia, with Brudos informing her: "I want you to come with me. I won't hurt you ... I won't rape you." He then grabbed the rear of Smith's coat and forced her to accompany him, but agreed to the child's request to let go of her coat as she walked alongside him. When Smith observed a woman working on her front lawn, she yelled and ran towards the woman, causing Brudos to flee from the scene.

Smith described her abductor as being in his early thirties, approximately 6 ft (1.83 m) in height, weighing 200 pounds and wearing dark glasses. All known sex offenders matching this description were investigated, but eliminated as suspects.

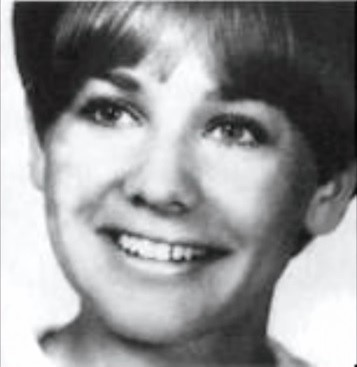
Linda Salee

=== Linda Dawn Salee ===
Salee was a 22-year-old removal firm secretary and part-time Portland State University student from Beaverton, Oregon, whom Brudos abducted from the grounds of the Lloyd Center shopping mall late in the afternoon of April 23, 1969. Salee had purchased a pair of slacks and a watchband as birthday gifts for her fiancé from the mall and was returning to her vehicle when approached by Brudos, who deceived her into believing he was a police officer by displaying a fake police badge and informing her she was being arrested for shoplifting. Although Salee protested her innocence, she agreed to accompany Brudos to his vehicle, where she was informed she was being kidnapped for ransom.

Brudos then drove toward his home; he parked inside his garage and ordered Salee to follow him across the yard to his home, believing his wife and children to be with relatives. At this moment, his wife appeared on the porch to inform him she had prepared the family dinner. In response, Brudos—over ten feet from the porch—signaled to Salee to stand still. (Note: This incident occurred upon or shortly after sunset. Ralphene Brudos would later insist she had not seen Salee behind her husband. The layout from the garage workshop to the porch of the Brudos household would have obscured Salee from Ralphene's peripheral vision for much of the route from the garage workshop to the household porch.) He informed his wife he would be in the house in a few moments, then returned Salee to the garage, where she was bound with cord. Brudos then entered the house alone to eat with his family.

Upon returning to the garage, Brudos discovered Salee had freed herself from her bonds, but had made no further efforts to escape. She attempted to resist his immediate efforts to place a leather strap around her neck and "pull her off her feet"—asking the question, "Why are you doing this to me?" Salee then began to scratch and kick Brudos as he lifted her from the ground by the leather strap, although she soon became unconscious. Brudos then proceeded to strangle Salee to death as he raped her.

Salee's body was then hung by the neck upon the same workshop pulley as Brudos's previous two victims; he then placed a hypodermic needle into her rib cage beneath each armpit through which he ran an electrical current in an effort to animate her body. Disappointed the experiment failed to produce dancing- or seizure-like symptoms but simply singed her flesh at the point of entry, Brudos rapidly abandoned this experiment. (Note: Brudos would later inform investigators his inspiration for performing this experiment upon Salee's corpse sourced from a near-fatal incident dating from 1967 in which he had accidentally electrocuted himself in the basement of the house in which he had previously resided.) He retained Salee's body for twenty-four hours, engaging in necrophilia on one occasion, before binding her body to a vehicle gearbox and discarding her in the Willamette River.

Although Brudos created a mold of Salee's breasts, he did not mutilate this section of her body as he had with previous victims as he believed her nipple areolae were too pink.

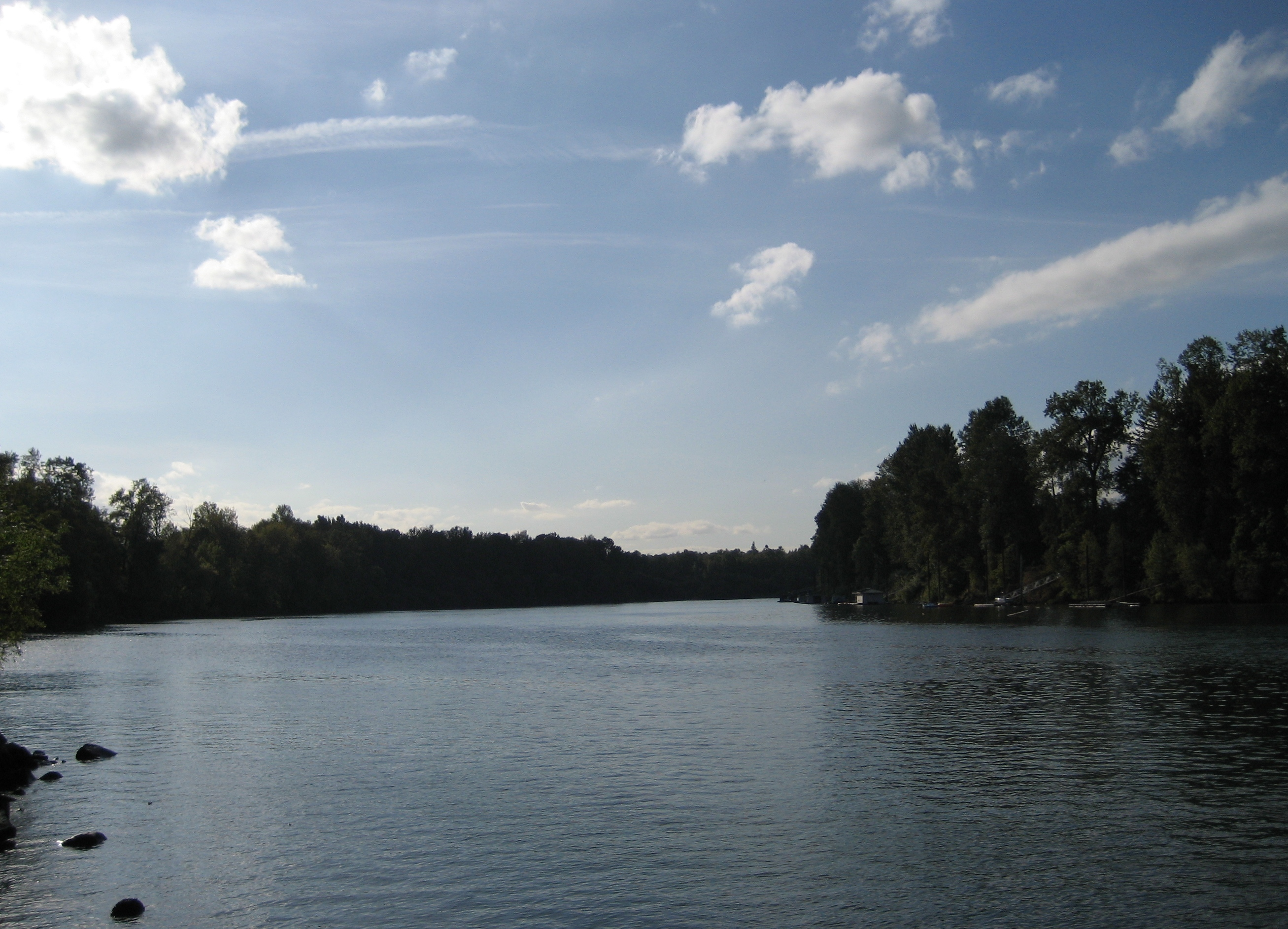
The Willamette River. The bodies of Salee and Sprinker were discovered in a tributary to this river on May 10 and 12, 1969.

== Discoveries ==
On May 10, 1969, two fishermen discovered what they believed to be a large parcel floating beneath the surface of the water in a shallow section of the Long Tom River. (Note: The Long Tom River is a tributary of the Willamette River.) Upon closer inspection, they discovered the parcel was actually the bound, bloated body of a young woman, clad in a coat, weighed down by a large gearbox with copper wiring twisted in a manner in which electricians trim electrical lines. The body was identified as that of Linda Salee. Due to the extent of decomposition, a subsequent autopsy was unable to determine whether she had been raped, although the coroner did rule her death as being due to strangulation. In addition, her autopsy revealed needle marks encircled by burning on each side of her rib cage close to her armpits, which had evidently been inflicted after death.

Two days later, an underwater search and recovery unit discovered the body of Karen Sprinker approximately 20 yards from where Salee's body had been found. Her body was similarly weighted to the river bed—in this case by a six-cylinder head—and she had been bound with precisely the same cord and copper wire as Salee's body had been. Sprinker's autopsy determined she had died of either smothering or strangulation, and both her breasts had been severed from her body after death. Although Sprinker was discovered wearing the same green skirt and sweater she had worn on the day of her disappearance, the size 38 D bra upon her body was many sizes too large for her, and had been stuffed with brown paper toweling in an apparent effort to simulate a much larger breast size.

=== Investigation ===
The most predominant factors in linking the deaths of Salee and Sprinker to the same perpetrator were the facts that both young women had been bound with the same brand of electrical flex and that both had been weighted with car components, suggesting their murderer might be an electrician or mechanic. In an effort to trace the origin of the car components, several officers questioned employees and proprietors of all garages and junkyards in western Oregon. Upon formally identifying both women, investigators also began questioning their family members and acquaintances. (Note: Two months prior to the discoveries of Salee and Sprinker, a fisherman had discovered the decomposed body of a 15-year-old Forest Grove girl named Stephanie Vilcko in Gales Creek. Vilcko had been missing since July 27, 1968. The circumstances surrounding Vilcko's disappearance, murder and discovery initially led investigators to connect her death to those of Salee and Sprinker. Her death was later determined to be unrelated to the case.)

Police questioning of Sprinker's fellow students at Oregon State University revealed several female students had received phone calls in recent months from a man claiming to be a Vietnam veteran who had asked to take them on dates. This man had used various aliases. Almost all had either refused or simply hung up the phone; however, one had recently felt a degree of pity and allowed the man to take her on a date. She described this man as being Caucasian, in his late twenties or early thirties, slightly overweight, with thinning "blondish-red" hair and freckles; his vehicle had been a dirty station wagon "with kids' clothes in it", leading her to believe he had actually been married.

The date itself had been a largely unpleasant experience, and Brudos had sensed the student's increasing unease in his presence, at one point indicating she had reason to be wary, stating: "Think of those two girls who were found in the river." Upon driving her home at the end of the date, he had asked her why she had changed her mind and agreed to accompany him, to which she replied she had been curious. According to the student, Brudos replied: "How did you know I wouldn't take you to the river and strangle you?"

== Suspect ==
Despite her desire to never accompany Brudos on another date, the student had not told him of this intention, and investigators asked her to contact them if this man ever again called her to ask for a date. The girl agreed. One week after the discovery of Salee's body, on May 18, Brudos again contacted the young woman; he was arrested as he walked toward the agreed rendezvous that evening.

Brudos provided police with his correct name, age and occupation, but gave a false address. With no legal basis to detain him, he was soon released from custody, although a background check revealed his history of physical and sexual violence towards women and a search of vehicle database records revealed he had resided in the district of Portland where Linda Slawson had last been seen alive. Upon discovering Brudos' actual address, investigators discovered he currently resided just blocks from the department store where Sprinker had been abducted. Furthermore, although Brudos did not drive a Volkswagen Karmann Ghia, investigators discovered his mother owned such a vehicle and that he had been in possession of the car on April 22—the date of the attempted abduction of Gloria Smith. Smith herself positively identified Brudos as the man who had attempted to abduct her. This information was deemed sufficient probable cause to obtain a search warrant of Brudos's property.

=== Search of Brudos's property ===
Eight days after Brudos's initial arrest, on May 26, a search of his property was conducted. Stowed within his garage, authorities discovered a large cache of women's lingerie and footwear, a list of phone numbers of sorority houses and college girls' living quarters and numerous Polaroid photographs of young women—some alive; some obviously deceased. Almost all the photographs had been taken in Brudos's garage, including several depicting a deceased woman hanging from the garage pulley with a mirror laid horizontally upon the floor directly beneath her feet. In one image, the reflection within the mirror depicted Brudos holding his Polaroid—indicating he had taken the photographs. One of the individuals depicted in these photographs was rapidly identified as Karen Sprinker; she was depicted standing nude save for high-heeled slippers with an expression of stern fear, contemplation and/or apparent resignation on her face. A severed female breast, coated with epoxy, was also discovered upon a mantel in the living room.

Police also discovered a coil of copper wiring determined to be of precisely the same type used to bind the bodies of Linda Salee and Karen Sprinker to engine components prior to their disposal in the Long Tom River. One length of rope confiscated by investigators was tied in precisely the same manner used to bind the victims' bodies. In addition, numerous engine components were scattered and stowed around the garage. These discoveries were deemed sufficient to place Brudos under constant surveillance.

== Arrest ==
By May 29, 1969, investigators had amassed sufficient evidence relating to the attempted abduction of Gloria Smith to arrest Brudos for this offense as inquiries into the murders continued. He was discovered by Oregon state troopers hiding beneath a blanket in the rear of the family station wagon as his wife drove the vehicle toward Portland. The following evening, Brudos placed a phone call to his wife asking her to destroy further incriminating evidence, although his wife refused this request.

Following this second arrest, Brudos was extensively questioned with regards to developments pertaining to the discoveries within his garage and his connection to the missing and murdered young women—three of whom investigators had positively identified as Whitney, Sprinker, and Salee. He initially denied involvement with any of the cases, dismissing the evidence as circumstantial for several days, before gradually divulging his erotic fetishes and outlining how deeply ingrained they had become within his psyche and had subsequently severely impacted his daily life.

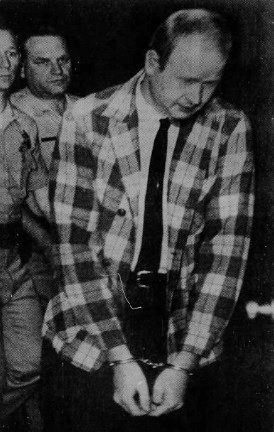
Brudos (right), pictured after his arrest in June 1969

=== Confession ===
By early June, Brudos had provided investigators with a full confession to all four murders, which he subsequently outlined for police and, later, psychologists. He began by outlining the opportunistic murder of Linda Slawson (whose name he was unable to recollect), which had not been linked to him and which he admitted had been instigated largely because of the attractive high-heeled shoes the young woman had been wearing when she had accidentally entered his property to sell encyclopedias, before outlining each of his subsequent murders and attempted abductions.

Although Brudos acknowledged ultimate responsibility for his crimes, he remained somewhat resistant when questioned with regards to aspects of reasoning and premeditation, simply stating at one stage, "There must be something wrong with me." He denied harboring a hatred of women, but admitted that the act of killing enabled him to "let off steam". The psychiatrists who examined Brudos concluded he was unable to achieve satisfaction from normal intercourse and that the overriding motive behind his crimes was lust, adding that, even in cases where Brudos had killed women he had encountered in moments of opportunism, he had known he would ultimately murder his victim.

Photographs Brudos had taken of two of his victims were conclusively matched to the victims discovered in the Long Tom River, and his description of Whitney and her abduction matched sufficiently the circumstances surrounding her November 1968 abduction to identify her as his second murder victim, although Slawson initially remained known as a Jane Doe. He was appointed an attorney named Dale Drake and an arraignment hearing was scheduled for 9 a.m. on June 4, 1969.

=== Formal charges ===
Brudos was formally indicted with the murder of Karen Sprinker June 4. He was also charged with the murders of Whitney and Salee on this date. In response to an entered plea of not guilty by reason of insanity at this initial arraignment, Brudos was subjected to a battery of psychiatric examinations by several doctors who unanimously concluded that he was sane and thus competent to stand trial. Accordingly, Brudos was informed his trial was to be held on June 30.

On June 13, Brudos was further indicted with the murders of Whitney and Salee, plus the attempted abduction of Gloria Smith. He again pleaded not guilty by reason of insanity to both murder charges, and innocent to the attempted abduction charge on this date.

== Conviction ==
On June 27, 1969, three days before his trial was scheduled to commence, Brudos formally entered a plea of guilty to three counts of first-degree murder before Marion County Circuit Court Judge Val D. Sloper; he was sentenced to three consecutive terms of life imprisonment with possibility of parole, to be served in Oregon State Penitentiary. Brudos repeatedly appealed his conviction, although every appeal was unsuccessful.

Despite Brudos's insistence that his wife had known nothing about any of his crimes and his insistence he had forced her to drive the family station wagon from their home on the date of his arrest as he hid within the vehicle, on August 7, 1969, Ralphene Brudos was formally indicted for the first-degree murder of Karen Sprinker. These charges were initially filed in relation to an eyewitness account from an individual who claimed to have seen Brudos's wife assisting him in forcing a blanket-covered young woman into their property on the date of Sprinker's disappearance. Ralphene denied all knowledge of the crime, and the eyewitness's account was refuted by other witnesses at her September 1969 trial. She was acquitted of all charges the following month.

== Incarceration ==
In the years following his incarceration, Brudos became a model prisoner. Assigned clerical duties by the 1970s, he later utilized his electronics skills to maintain the prison's computer record system and install a cable television network in addition to being entrusted with stocking, repairing, and maintaining the prison vending machines. As a convicted sex offender, Brudos is known to have endured several physical assaults by fellow inmates, although in each instance, he refused to name his assailants.

Brudos was also permitted to order mail-order catalogs depicting women modeling high-heeled shoes and underwear; he used this material to fuel his erotic and masturbatory fantasies.

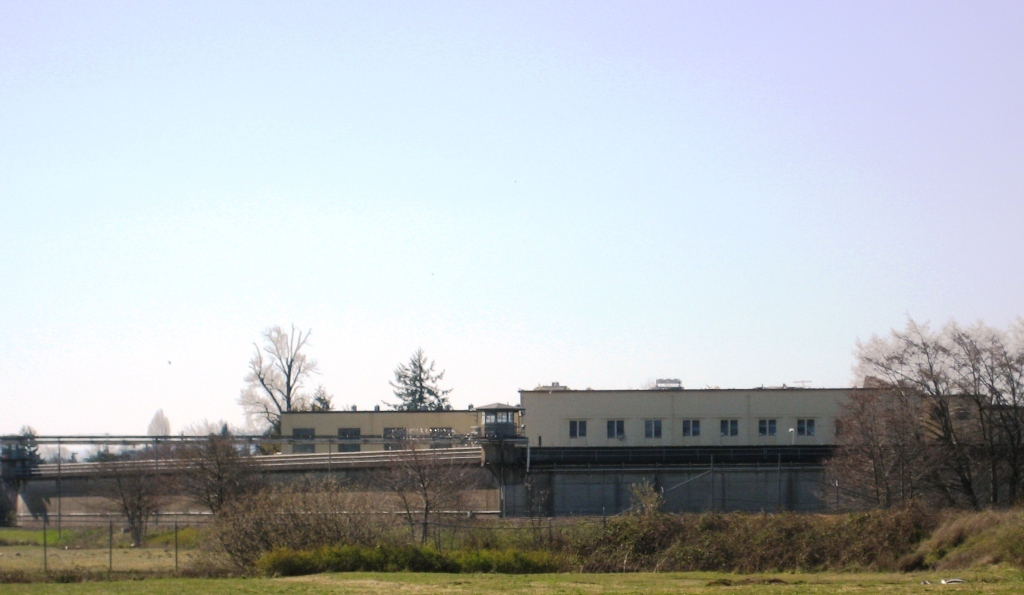
Oregon State Penitentiary. Brudos remained incarcerated at this facility until his death in 2006.

== Aftermath ==
Brudos attended numerous parole hearings throughout his confinement. Family members of his victims consistently attended the hearings to request that he remain incarcerated for the duration of his life. On June 21, 1995, he was informed that he would spend the remainder of his life in prison. Nonetheless, Brudos continued to attend informal parole hearings every two years for the remainder of his life.

While incarcerated, Brudos granted several interviews to numerous individuals of varying professions. One of these individuals was a former Marion County detective named Jim Byrnes, who later recollected a conversation with Brudos regarding compassion and remorse in which he asked: "Do you feel some remorse, Jerry? Do you feel sorry for your victims, for the girls who died?" In response, Brudos picked up a section of paper from the table between the two; he crunched the section of paper into a ball, then threw the ball onto the floor, replying: "That much ... I care about those girls as much as I care about that piece of wadded-up paper." Psychiatrist Michael H. Stone identified Brudos as having a psychopathic personality, noting his callousness and lack of remorse for his crimes.

Brudos died of liver cancer while incarcerated within the Oregon State Penitentiary at 5:10 a.m. on March 28, 2006. At the time of his death, he was 67 years old and the longest incarcerated inmate in the Oregon Department of Corrections, having served a total of almost 37 years' imprisonment.

Upon receipt of news of Brudos's death, the younger sister of Jan Whitney informed a reporter: "As soon as I heard he was dead, I started crying, and it wasn't for him; it was for our family. He put our family through hell. You're never really the same." This sentiment was echoed by one of the detectives assigned to the case, James Stovall, who stated: "I'm satisfied he has died ... it's just good riddance. He was a true monster."

Shortly after Brudos's arrest, his wife, Ralphene, was charged with being an accessory to murder in one of her husband's crimes, despite his insistence his wife held no knowledge of any of his abductions and murders. The Brudos children were taken into state care, and Theresa Brudos (age 7) was later instructed to undergo questioning at her mother's upcoming trial.

Following her acquittal, Ralphene Brudos regained custody of her children. She divorced and ultimately severed all contact with her husband, changed her name and relocated to an undisclosed state, although Brudos professed his love for her for the remainder of his life.

Brudos was never brought to trial for the murder of Linda Slawson. Though he confessed to Slawson's murder and several Polaroid photographs discovered in his garage corroborated his admissions of having photographed her appendages, he was never tried for her murder due to insufficient real evidence because although Brudos had retained photographs of her lower legs, ankles, and feet, he had not photographed other areas of her body after death. As such, it was not possible for investigators to prove that the photographs had been taken after Slawson's murder.

Jan Whitney's body was found submerged in the Willamette River close to Independence, Oregon, exactly one month after Brudos's conviction. Her body was recovered approximately one mile downstream from the location Brudos had indicated and was identified via dental records. The body of Linda Slawson was never found.

== Media ==
=== Literature ===
- Rule, Ann (1994). Lust Killer. New York: Signet Books. ISBN 0-4511-6687-6. Link: Registration required

=== Television ===
- Most Evil S01E06 "Deadly Desires" (2006). Narrated by Tim Hopper, this episode was first broadcast in August 2006.
- Jerome Brudos: The Lust Killer (2008). Directed by Jeffrey Woods, this hour-long documentary was first broadcast in June 2008.
- Mindhunter S01E07 "Episode 7" (2017). Directed by Andrew Douglas, this episode was first broadcast in October 2017.
- Most Evil Killers S05E03 "Jerry Brudos" (2021). Narrated by Fred Dinenage, this episode was first broadcast in February 2021.

== See also ==
- List of kidnappings (1960–1969)
- List of serial killers by number of victims
- List of serial killers in the United States
- Lust murder – Murder motivated by sexual arousal
- Paraphilia – Atypical sexual interest
- Sexual fetishism – Sexual arousal a person receives from an object or situation

== Cited works and further reading ==
- Blundell, Nigel (1983). The Encyclopedia of Serial Killers. London: PRC Press. ISBN 978-1-856-48328-5.
- Cawthorne, Nigel; Tibballs, Geoff (1993). Killers. London: Boxtree. pp. 437–441. ISBN 0-752-20850-0.
- Cawthorne, Nigel (1999). The World's Greatest Serial Killers. London: Chancellor Press. ISBN 978-0-753-70089-1.
- Douglas, John E.; Olshaker, Mark (2012) [1995]. Mindhunter: Inside the FBI's Elite Serial Crime Unit. New York: Scribner Books. pp. 134–139. ISBN 978-1-501-19196-1.
- Foreman, Laura (1992). Serial Killers: True Crime. The editors of Time-Life Books (Hardcover ed.). Alexandria, Virginia: Time-Life. ISBN 978-0-7835-0001-0.
- Frasier, David (1996). Murder Cases of the Twentieth Century: Biographies and Bibliographies of 280 Convicted or Accused Killers. Jefferson: McFarland & Company. ISBN 978-0-786-40184-0.
- Hickey, Eric W. (1991). Serial Murderers and Their Victims. Belmont, California: Wadsworth Publishing. ISBN 978-0-534-15414-1.
- Holmes, Stephen T.; Holmes, Ronald M. (2008). Sex Crimes: Patterns and Behavior. Louisville, Kentucky: Sage Publications. ISBN 978-1-412-95298-9.
- Holmes, Ronald M.; Holmes, Stephen T. (2009). Profiling Violent Crimes: An Investigative Tool. Thousand Oaks, California: Sage Publications. ISBN 978-1-452-27681-6.
- Holmes, Ronald M.; Holmes, Stephen T. (2010). Serial Murder: 3rd Edition. Louisville, Kentucky: Sage Publications. ISBN 978-1-412-97442-4.
- Lane, Brian; Gregg, Wilfred (1995) [1992]. The Encyclopedia Of Serial Killers. New York City: Berkley Books. pp. 75–77. ISBN 0-425-15213-8.
- Marrison, James (2010). The World's Most Bizarre Murders. London: John Blake Publishing. ISBN 978-1-843-58698-2.
- Petherick, Wayne (2012). Profiling and Serial Crime: Theoretical and Practical Issues. Waltham, Maine: Elsevier Science. ISBN 978-0-124-05901-6.
- Ressler, Robert; Schachtman, Tom (1992). Whoever Fights Monsters: My Twenty Years Hunting Serial Killers for the FBI. London: St Martin's Press. ISBN 978-0-671-71561-8.
- Rule, Ann (1983). Lust Killer. New York City: Prometheus Books. ISBN 978-1-101-66745-3.
- Stone, Michael H. (2017). The Anatomy of Evil. Amherst, New York: Skyhorse Publishing. ISBN 978-1-633-88336-9.
- Stone, Michael H.; Brucato, Gary (2019). The New Evil: Understanding the Emergence of Modern Violent Crime. Amherst, New York: Prometheus Books. ISBN 978-1-633-88532-5.
- Turvey, Brent E. (2011). Criminal Profiling: An Introduction to Behavioral Evidence Analysis. Amsterdam: Elsevier Science. ISBN 978-0-123-85244-1.
- Vickers, Marques (2021). Murder in Oregon: Notorious Crime Sites. Somerset, England: Marquis Publishing. ISBN 979-8-715-41540-0.
- Vronsky, Peter (2004). Serial Killers: The Method and Madness of Monsters. New York City: Berkley Publishing. ISBN 978-0-425-19640-3.
- Whittington-Egan, Richard; Whittington-Egan, Molly (1992). The Murder Almanac. Glasgow: Neil Wilson Publishing. pp. 31–32. ISBN 978-1-897-78404-4.
- Wilson, Colin (2023). Hunting Serial Killers: Criminal Profilers and Their Search for the World's Most Wanted Manhunters. New York: Skyhorse Publishing. ISBN 978-1-510-77240-3.
