= The Haunting of Sharon Tate =

2018 film by Daniel Farrands

- Theatrical release poster
- Directed by: Daniel Farrands
- Written by: Daniel Farrands
- Produced by: Lucas Jarach; Daniel Farrands; Eric Brenner
- Starring: Hilary Duff; Jonathan Bennett; Lydia Hearst; Pawel Szajda; Ryan Cargill
- Cinematography: Carlo Rinaldi
- Edited by: Dan Riddle
- Music by: Fantom
- Production companies: Voltage Pictures; Skyline Entertainment; ETA Films; Green Light Pictures; 1428 Films
- Distributed by: Saban Films
- Release date: April 5, 2019 (United States)
- Running time: 90 minutes
- Country: United States
- Language: English

The Haunting of Sharon Tate is a 2019 American horror thriller film written and directed by Daniel Farrands, and starring Hilary Duff, Jonathan Bennett, Lydia Hearst, Pawel Szajda and Ryan Cargill. The film is a fictionalized account of the 1969 Tate murders, following actress Sharon Tate (Duff) as she suffers premonitions of her murder by the Manson family.

It was released in the United States on April 5, 2019, by Saban Films. The film was panned by critics.

== Plot ==
In August 1968, actress Sharon Tate describes to a journalist a nightmare she had, in which she and Jay Sebring, her friend and former lover, had their throats slashed. One year later, a very pregnant Sharon returns home after spending six months in Europe filming The Thirteen Chairs. She is initially happy to be reunited with Jay, as well as friend/house-sitter Abigail "Gibby" Folger and Abigail's boyfriend Wojciech Frykowski. Sharon's husband, Roman Polanski, has stayed behind in Europe to complete the script for his next film The Day of the Dolphin, but has assured Sharon he will be home in time for the birth of their baby. That night, Sharon tells Jay that she believes Roman is having an affair; Jay tells her it doesn't have to be this way, but Sharon is determined to save her marriage for the sake of the baby. Later, Sharon becomes angered upon finding that a new caretaker, Steven Parent, is living in a trailer on the property without her knowledge and asks what happened to the previous caretaker, William Garretson. She is told Garretson "hasn't been around in awhile." That night, while the group is socializing, Wojciech answers a knock at the door to find Charles Manson asking to see the house's former owner, music producer Terry Melcher. Wojciech tells Manson he has the wrong house.

The following morning, Sharon and Abigail go for a walk, where they encounter two strange women, and subsequently find Sharon's pet dog dead alongside the trail. In the house's study, Sharon uncovers a recording of folk music by Manson, left behind by Melcher. The music disturbs her, and she remembers Manson's voice from her nightmare. Sharon later tells to Jay that she finds Abigail and Wojciech's extended stay at her home oppressive, and that she wishes they would leave. That night, Abigail sees a woman standing outside the window of her bedroom. Sharon has a nightmare in which she, Jay, Abigail, and Wojciech are brutally murdered by Tex Watson, Patricia Krenwinkel, and Susan Atkins.

Sharon becomes convinced that Manson and his "family" are plotting to kill her, but Abigail and Wojciech dismiss her fears as paranoia stemming from her pregnancy. Sharon brings the Manson recording to Steven, who is knowledgeable about technology, and he determines that it contains subliminal messages when played in reverse, revealing the phrase "Helter Skelter." Sharon subsequently has a nightmare in which she finds Steven's corpse in his car, and becomes convinced the dreams are premonitions. When Sharon believes she is going into labor, Steven runs to start his car. Sharon sees that Manson's followers have arrived, and rushes to the car, attempting to thwart his impending murder. Steven crashes the car into a fence, and he and Sharon flee back to the house on foot, as Tex shoots in their direction repeatedly.

In the house, Sharon, Abigail, Steven, and Wojciech attempt to barricade the entrances, and find the power has been cut. Jay arrives at the house as the group is confronted by Tex, who tells Jay he is the devil and has come "to do the devil's business." Tex and Susan usher them into the living room, where Steven and Wojciech are bound and gagged. Sharon stabs Tex with a penknife and frees Jay. In the ensuing melee, Abigail kills Susan by smashing her head on the corner of the fireplace.

Sharon, Jay, Abigail, and Steven retreat to Steven's trailer, while Patricia searches the house for Wojciech. She attempts to kill him, but he violently beats her before drowning her in the bathtub. Tex, injured but still alive, tracks the group as Steven attempts to use a CB radio to call for help. Tex breaches the camper, but Steven beats him with a shovel before Sharon shoots him to death.

At dawn, the group approaches the house. As the others continue to the main road, Sharon returns to observe the crime scene. She is shocked to discover the corpses of Jay, Wojciech, Abigail and herself. Sharon realizes that the previous events were merely imagined, her "premonitions" were actually memories, and she and the others are, in fact, ghosts. Sharon, Jay, Abigail, Wojciech and Steven — realizing they are in the afterlife — walk away from the house, Sharon holding the son that she did not live to give birth to.

== Cast ==
- Hilary Duff as Sharon Tate
- Jonathan Bennett as Jay Sebring
- Lydia Hearst as Abigail "Gibby" Folger
- Tyler Johnson as Tex Watson
- Pawel Szajda as Wojciech Frykowski
- Ryan Cargill as Steven Parent
- Fivel Stewart as Patricia "Yellow" Krenwinkel
- Bella Popa as Susan "Sadie" Atkins
- Ben Mellish as Charles Manson

== Production ==
In February 2018, it was announced Hilary Duff, Jonathan Bennett and Lydia Hearst had joined the cast, with Daniel Farrands writing and directing. Lucas Jarach and Eric Brenner would serve as producers on the film, while Jim Jacobsen and Jorge Garcia Castro would serve as executive producers under their Skyline Entertainment banner. Duff also served as an executive producer for the film.

== Release ==
In November 2018, Saban Films acquired US distribution rights to the film. It was released in select theaters and on demand in the United States on April 5, 2019.

== Reception ==
On Rotten Tomatoes, the film has an approval rating of 18%, based on 33 reviews, with an average rating of 3.8/10. The website's consensus reads: "The Haunting of Sharon Tate dishonors the events it seeks to dramatize with a poorly acted and offensively exploitative take on a real life tragedy." On Metacritic, it has a weighted average score of 8 out of 100 based on 10 reviews, indicating "overwhelming dislike".

Owen Gleiberman of Variety gave it a negative review, writing: "[T]he movie's petty folly — its failure of imagination and morality — is that it actually goes out of its way to turn the Manson murders into schlock horror." Frank Scheck, writing for The Hollywood Reporter, referred to Duff as being "miscast" in the title role, and wrote that the film "deserves the instant obscurity for which it is certainly destined." David Ehrlich of IndieWire gave the film a grade of "D−", calling it "unfathomably bad" and writing that it "depicts the final days of Tate's life with all the sensitivity of a snuff film."

Noel Murray of the Los Angeles Times wrote that the film "turns the Manson cult’s crimes into fodder for a sleazy B-thriller". TheWrap's William Bibbiani wrote: "It's far too early to call [The Haunting of Sharon Tate] the worst movie of the year. But if it's not, it's going to be a rough 2019." Katie Rife of The A.V. Club gave it a grade "F" and wrote: "The worst part of The Haunting of Sharon Tate is how seriously it takes its ham-fisted themes of fate and the nature of reality; the movie opens with an Edgar Allen Poe quote, for fuck’s sake." Sheila O'Malley of RogerEbert.com gave the film zero out of four stars, calling it "appalling from start to finish".

=== Accolades ===
Year	Award	Category	Recipient(s)	Result	Ref.
2019	Hollywood Reel Independent Film Festival Awards	Best Picture	The Haunting of Sharon Tate	Nominated	
2019	Hollywood Reel Independent Film Festival Awards	Best Horror Movie	The Haunting of Sharon Tate	Won	
2019	Hollywood Reel Independent Film Festival Awards	Best Director	Daniel Farrands	Won	
2019	Hollywood Reel Independent Film Festival Awards	Best Actress	Hilary Duff	Won	
2020	Golden Raspberry Awards	Worst Picture	Lucas Jarach, Daniel Farrands & Eric Brenner	Nominated	
2020	Golden Raspberry Awards	Worst Actress	Hilary Duff	Won	
2020	Golden Raspberry Awards	Worst Screenplay	Daniel Farrands	Nominated	
2020	Golden Raspberry Awards	Worst Reckless Disregard for Human Life and Public Property		Nominated	
