= Harvey Carignan =

American serial killer (1927–2023)

- Carignan in 1974
- Born: Harvey Louis Carignan; May 18, 1927; Fargo, North Dakota, U.S.
- Died: March 6, 2023 (aged 95); Oak Park Heights, Minnesota, U.S.
- Other names: The Want-Ad Killer
- Convictions: Territory of Alaska; First degree murder (overturned); Assault with intent to commit rape Washington; Second degree burglary Parole violation Minnesota; First degree murder Second degree murder Attempted murder Aggravated sodomy (3 counts); Sodomy upon a child Indecent liberties Attempted third degree burglary
- Penalty: Territory of Alaska; Death; commuted to 15 years imprisonment Washington; 15 years imprisonment Minnesota; Life imprisonment

Details
- Victims: 3–5+
- Span of crimes: July 31, 1949 – September 20, 1974
- Country: United States
- States: Territory of Alaska, Minnesota, Washington
- Date apprehended: September 24, 1974
- Imprisoned at: Minnesota Correctional Facility – Oak Park Heights

Harvey Louis Carignan (May 18, 1927 – March 6, 2023) was an American serial killer who was sentenced to life in prison for the murders of two women in the early 1970s. He had been previously convicted of a 1949 rape and murder he committed while stationed in the U.S. Army in Anchorage, Alaska. He was imprisoned at the Minnesota Correctional Facility – Oak Park Heights, Stillwater, MN, until his death in 2023.

== Biography ==
Carignan was born to an unmarried 20-year-old mother in North Dakota on May 18, 1927. At the age of 10, Carignan returned to live with his mother after spending time with his aunt and uncle in North Dakota and Minnesota. He had a bedwetting issue as a child and was diagnosed as having childhood chorea and enuresis in a Mandan, North Dakota, reform school. Carignan encountered a great deal of academic difficulty. At the age of 18, he graduated from the reform school and enlisted in the U.S. Army. He was stationed in Anchorage, Alaska.

== Initial murder ==
On July 31, 1949, Carignan murdered 57-year-old Laura Showalter during an attempted rape in the Territory of Alaska. On September 16, 1949, he tried to rape another woman, Christine Norton, and was arrested the next day. Later that year, Carignan was convicted of first degree murder and assault with intent to commit rape and sentenced to death by hanging. However, in 1951, Carignan won a new trial for his murder conviction on the grounds that his confession had been improperly obtained. An officer interrogating Carignan had told him he would not be executed if he confessed to the murder. Carignan's confession was suppressed and the murder charge was later dismissed due to insufficient evidence to convict him without the confession. He continued to serve a 15-year sentence for the attempted rape of Christine Norton. In 1952, Carignan was transferred to Alcatraz Federal Penitentiary, before being paroled in 1960.

== Later crimes ==
Just months after his parole, Harvey and his brother, Clinton, who was also a parolee from Alcatraz, were arrested for burglary in Minnesota. They were convicted of attempted third degree burglary, and Harvey was returned to prison for four years, serving his time at USP Leavenworth. He was paroled on March 2, 1964. In November 1964, Carignan was arrested for second degree burglary in Washington. He was found guilty, received a 15-year sentence and was paroled once more in 1968. Carignan later served another year for violating his parole.

On October 15, 1972, 19-year-old Laura Leslie Brock was found dead in Washington. She had been killed by several blows to the head. At least one person claimed to have seen Brock get into Carignan's truck. On May 1, 1973, 15-year-old Kathy Sue Miller saw a "help wanted" ad by Carignan for his gas station. When she showed up, Carignan raped her and beat her to death with a hammer. Miller's body was found months later by two boys riding dirt bikes on the Tulalip reservation north of Everett, Washington. She was bundled in a sheet of plastic with hammer holes in her skull. Although he was considered the prime suspect, Carignan never faced charges in the murders of Brock or Miller due to a lack of evidence. On September 9, 1973, Carignan picked up 13-year-old hitchhiker Jerri Billings in Minnesota. He sexually assaulted her and beat her with a hammer before releasing her, warning her not to say anything.

In May 1974, Carignan began living with a 29-year-old woman named Eileen Hunley. They settled in Minnesota. On August 9, 1974, however, Hunley left Carignan. She disappeared the next day. Her body was found about five weeks later. Hunley's skull had been imploded by blows to the head, and she had been raped with a tree branch.

On September 14, 1974, Carignan picked up Gwen Burton from a Sears parking lot. He ripped off her clothing, choked her until she was nearly unconscious and sexually assaulted her with a hammer. Afterwards, Carignan dumped Burton in a field. She survived, however, and was able to find help. On September 18, 1974, Carignan picked up teenage girls Sally Versoi and Diane Flynn. He forced the two to perform oral sex and beat them if they did not follow his commands. Versoi and Flynn escaped when Carignan stopped for gas. On September 20, 1974, 18-year-old Katherine Schultz disappeared. Her body was found the next day in a cornfield. She had been beaten to death with a hammer, and her skull had imploded.

=== Final arrest and trial ===
Carignan was arrested on September 24, 1974. He was charged with attempted murder and aggravated sodomy. Carignan pleaded insanity, claiming God had ordered him to "kill whores and harlots." His defense failed, and in 1975, he was found guilty of both charges. After his conviction, Carignan had a mental evaluation and was diagnosed with antisocial personality disorder. Months later, he was found guilty of indecent liberties, sodomy upon a child and two additional counts of aggravated sodomy. Carignan was sentenced to a total of 60 years in prison. Afterwards, he was indicted on murder charges for killing Schultz and Hunley. Carignan pleaded guilty to second-degree murder for killing Schultz and received a 40-year sentence. He was convicted of first-degree murder for killing Hunley and received a life sentence.

=== Death ===
Carignan died at Minnesota Correctional Facility – Oak Park Heights on March 6, 2023, at the age of 95.

== See also ==
- Harvey Glatman
- Lonely hearts killer
- List of serial killers in the United States
