= Ann Rule =

American true crime author (1931–2015)

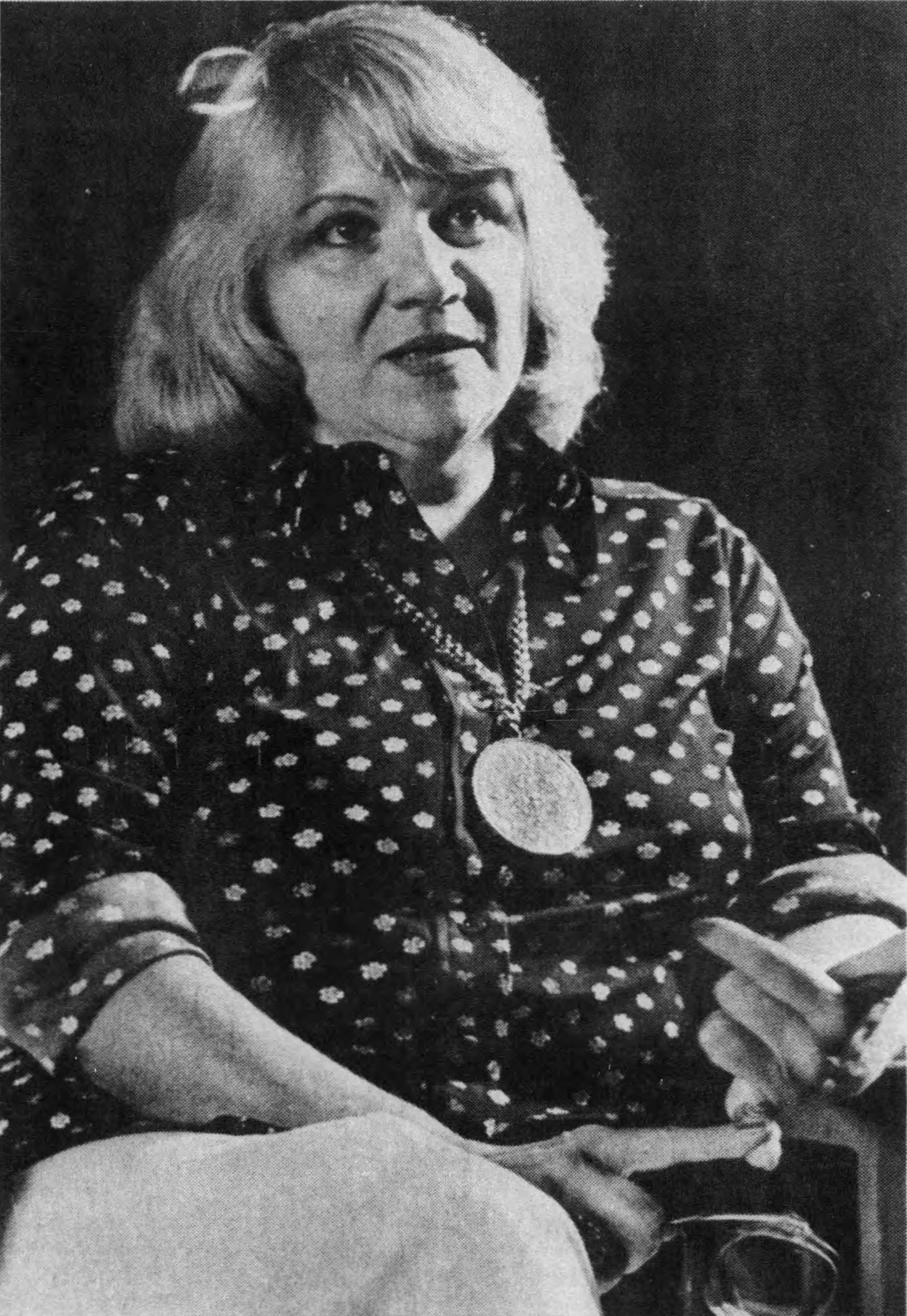
- Rule in 1980
- Born: Ann Rae Stackhouse; October 22, 1931; Lowell, Michigan, U.S.
- Died: July 25, 2015 (aged 83); Burien, Washington, U.S.
- Occupation: Writer
- Children: 4, including Leslie Rule
- Writing career
- Subject: True crime
- Notable works: The Stranger Beside Me; Small Sacrifices
- Website: authorannrule.com

Ann Rae Rule (née Stackhouse; October 22, 1931 – July 25, 2015) was an American author of true crime books and articles. She is best known for The Stranger Beside Me (1980), about the serial killer Ted Bundy, her co-worker and one-time friend, who was later revealed to be a murderer. Rule wrote over 30 true crime books, including Small Sacrifices, about Oregon child murderer Diane Downs. Many of Rule's books center on murder cases that occurred in the Pacific Northwest and her adopted home state of Washington.

== Early life and education ==
Ann Rae Stackhouse was born on October 22, 1931, in Lowell, Michigan. She was one of two children of Sophie Marie (Hansen) and Chester R. Stackhouse. Her mother was a teacher, specializing in developmentally disabled children, and her father was a football and track and field coach. As Rule did during young adulthood, her family members had careers in law enforcement. Rule's grandfather and uncle were sheriffs in Michigan. Another uncle was a medical examiner and a cousin was a prosecutor. Rule spent summers with her grandparents doing volunteer work at the local jail.

She graduated from Coatesville High School in Chester County, Pennsylvania and later earned an associate degree from Highline Community College in Des Moines, Washington. Rule also attended the University of Washington, studying creative writing, criminology and psychology.

== Career ==
Rule's career path included working as a police officer for the Seattle Police Department as well as writing for publications geared toward women. Beginning in 1969, she wrote for True Detective magazine under the pen name "Andy Stack".

While volunteering at a suicide crisis hotline center in Seattle in 1971, Rule met Ted Bundy, a work-study student who was studying psychology at the University of Washington. After Bundy moved to Utah for law school, he was arrested in 1975 for kidnapping a young woman and later identified as a serial murderer with an unknown number of victims dating to at least 1974 if not earlier. During the time they worked together, Rule observed nothing disturbing in Bundy's personality, and saw him as "kind, solicitous, and empathetic".

Her first book, The Stranger Beside Me, is considered one of the most definitive biographies of Bundy. First published in 1980, the year Bundy was convicted of murder, the book was written under her own name rather than the pen name she had previously used. In the book, Rule reveals that Bundy told her the number of women he murdered was much larger than police believed. In 2003, Rule was portrayed by Barbara Hershey in the movie version of the book. The made-for-TV film adaptation also starred Billy Campbell as Bundy.

Rule's next three books, Lust Killer about Jerry Brudos, The Want-Ad Killer about Harvey Carignan, and The I-5 Killer about Randall Woodfield, were released with her pen name but following the success of the book about Bundy, they were re-released under her own name. Rule's 1987 work, Small Sacrifices, tells the story of Diane Downs, an Oregon woman who in May 1983 murdered her daughter and attempted to murder her other two children. The book was filmed for television in 1989, with Farrah Fawcett in an Emmy-nominated and Peabody-cited performance.

In April 2012, 48 Hours Mystery covered Rule's successful effort to help a mother prove her daughter's 1998 death was actually a murder. The resulting book was In the Still of the Night. One of her last books, Practice to Deceive, about a 2003 murder on Whidbey Island, Washington, was released in October 2013. On the island for the launch of a book tour, Rule fell in the hotel and broke her hip, forcing the cancellation of the event.

On February 13, 2026, Publishers Marketplace reported that investigative journalist and author Cathy Scott, in a four-book deal, was writing a biography of Ann Rule, titled First Lady of Murder, for publication in spring 2026 by WildBlue Press. The book was released in June 2026 by Wildblue Press.

== Methods and themes ==
In its obituary for Rule, The New York Times quoted Rule on her approach to true crime writing and her favorite themes, writing, "To choose a book subject, I weed through about 3,000 suggestions from readers. I'm looking for an 'antihero' whose eventual arrest shocks those who knew him (or her): attractive, brilliant, charming, popular, wealthy, talented, and much admired in their communities — but really hiding behind masks." A Guardian article about Rule developed the idea further, writing, "It's tough, she says, but she doesn't want to hear about killers who are 'ugly, mean and have no charm. We’re not interested in the kind of person who looks like he would commit murder. We want to know about the kind who you could not imagine having this monstrous self behind the pleasant face.'"

Rule's style of true crime writing brought some criticism. An evaluation of her influence on the genre noted negative commentary on her approach to her most infamous subject. Despite the commercial success of her books, the critical and public reception of The Stranger Beside Me was not always generous. After Rule's death in 2015, Victoria Beale wrote a piece for The New Yorker titled "Too Close to Ted Bundy" in which Beale accused Rule of making poor ethical choices in reporting the story and her involvement in Bundy's life after he went to jail, including sending money to Bundy while he was in jail. "Rule's role shifts from being inadvertently involved with a serial killer to an author considering how lucrative her access could be," Beale writes."

== Legal dispute ==
After the release of Rule's 2003 book Heart Full of Lies, which chronicles the manslaughter conviction in the 2000 shooting death of Liysa Northon's husband Chris, Northon filed a defamation lawsuit against Rule and her publisher. The 9th Circuit Court of Appeals dismissed the suit in January 2011. While Northon was serving 12 years in prison for the killing, her fiancé Rick Swart wrote a front-page article for the Seattle Weekly newspaper that accused Rule of "sloppy storytelling" in Rule's Heart Full of Lies book. Swart did not disclose in the article that he was engaged to marry Northon, nor did his editors at the paper know of the relationship. In response to the article, Rule in 2013 filed a libel suit against the newspaper and the writer through attorney Anne Bremner, stating that Rule had been defamed by the article's criticism, causing damage to her reputation.

In February 2014, a judge dismissed Rule's claims, finding that there were no false or defamatory statements about her in the article. The judge then awarded the defendants $10,000 each in damages plus attorney fees and costs. Rule appealed the judgment, and on June 22, 2015, the Washington state Court of Appeals vacated the earlier judgment against Rule and remanded the case to trial. After Rule's death in July 2015, as of January 2017, there had been no further developments in the case.

== Personal life and death ==
Rule lived in Normandy Park, Washington and had four children, including paranormal author Leslie Rule. Rule's family included five grandchildren and a foster son. She was married to Bill Rule, from whom she was divorced in 1972.

In April 2015, Normandy Park Police charged Rule's two sons with theft against their mother. Neither man was jailed. The charges against the sons were dropped on August 14, 2015, nineteen days after Rule's death. King County Senior Deputy Prosecutor Amanda Froh wrote to the court, "Given the recent death of victim Ann Rule on July 26, 2015, the interests of justice are best served by dismissal of this case."

Rule's family and publisher, Simon & Schuster, announced on July 26, 2015, that Rule had died a day earlier as a result of congestive heart failure in Burien, Washington. Her death followed an emergency-room visit because of a heart attack. Rule had been moved to hospice care the day before her death.

== Published works ==
=== True crime ===
- The Stranger Beside Me (1980)
- Lust Killer (1983)
- The Want-Ad Killer (1983)
- The I-5 Killer (1984)
- Small Sacrifices (1987)
- If You Really Loved Me (1991)
- Everything She Ever Wanted (1992)
- A Rose for Her Grave and Other True Cases: Crime Files Vol. 1 (1993)
- You Belong to Me and Other True Cases: Crime Files Vol. 2 (1994)
- Dead By Sunset (1995)
- A Fever in the Heart and Other True Cases: Crime Files Vol. 3 (1996)
- Bitter Harvest (1997)
- In the Name of Love and Other True Cases: Crime Files Vol. 4 (1998)
- The End of the Dream: The Golden Boy Who Never Grew Up: Crime Files Vol. 5 (1998)
- A Rage to Kill and Other True Cases: Crime Files Vol. 6 (1999)
- And Never Let Her Go (1999)
- Empty Promises: Crime Files Vol. 7 (2001)
- Every Breath You Take (2001)
- Heart Full of Lies (2001)
- Last Dance, Last Chance and Other True Cases: Crime Files Vol. 8 (2003)
- Without Pity: Ann Rule's Most Dangerous Killers: Crime Files Updates (2003)
- Green River, Running Red (2004)
- Kiss Me, Kill Me and Other True Cases: Crime Files Vol. 9 (2004)
- Worth More Dead and Other True Cases: Crime Files Vol. 10 (2005)
- No Regrets and Other True Cases: Crime Files Vol. 11 (2006)
- Smoke, Mirrors, and Murder and Other True Cases: Crime Files Vol. 12 (2007)
- Too Late to Say Goodbye (2007)
- Mortal Danger and Other True Cases: Crime Files Vol. 13 (2008)
- But I Trusted You and Other True Cases: Crime Files Vol. 14 (2009)
- In the Still of the Night (2010)
- Don't Look Behind You and Other True Cases: Crime Files Vol. 15 (2011)
- Fatal Friends, Deadly Neighbors, and Other True Cases: Crime Files Vol. 16 (2012)
- Danger in the Dorm (re-released 2013)
- Practice to Deceive (2013)
- Lying in Wait and Other True Cases: Ann Rule's Crime Files: Vol. 17 (2014)

=== Crime fiction ===
- Possession (1983)

=== Accolades ===
In 2008, the Library of America selected Rule's story "Young Love" from the book Empty Promises for inclusion in its two-century retrospective of American true crime writing, True Crime: An American Anthology.

Rule's book Fatal Friends, Deadly Neighbors and Other True Cases was named one of the top three 2012 Best True Crime Books, along with books by authors Cathy Scott and Kathryn Casey, in a True Crime Zine readers poll.
