= The Stranger Beside Me =

1980 book by Ann Rule

- First edition
- Author: Ann Rule
- Language: English
- Genre: True crime
- Publisher: W. W. Norton & Company
- Publication date: August 17, 1980
- English publication date: 1980
- Pages: 480
- ISBN: 978-0-393-05029-5
- OCLC: 47123669

The Stranger Beside Me is a 1980 autobiographical and biographical true crime book written by Ann Rule about American serial killer Ted Bundy, whom she knew personally before and after his arrest for a series of murders. Subsequent revisions of the book were published in 1986, 1989, 2000, 2008, and 2021.

== Plot summary ==
Rule met Bundy in 1971 when he was a psychology student at the University of Washington and contemplating a career in law and politics. They worked together at a crisis center taking telephone calls from those at risk of suicide or facing other difficulties.

Rule, who was over a decade older than Bundy, developed a close friendship with him, sharing meals and conversations. They fell out of contact in late 1973 after he stopped working at the crisis center.

Starting in early 1974, a series of brutal murders of young women in the Seattle area shocked the city and gained major attention. Women were killed at a rate of roughly once every 30 days. Bundy was considered a possible suspect from the summer of 1974, when the unidentified killer was observed by several witnesses talking with two young women who later disappeared at Lake Sammamish State Park.

The man was described as tall, handsome and identified himself as "Ted." A sketch based on eyewitness descriptions was noted by several people—including Rule—to resemble Bundy. Rule thought it unlikely that Bundy was a killer but nonetheless reported him to police. However, authorities were overwhelmed with tips regarding the murders and did not initially believe Bundy was a likely suspect due to his superficially respectable persona.

Bundy relocated to Salt Lake City in late 1974 after being admitted to law school at the University of Utah. The killings in Seattle stopped, but young women in Utah, Colorado and Idaho began disappearing and being murdered under similar circumstances to the Seattle-area crimes. Police investigators in several states began sharing information, increasingly narrowing down on Bundy as their suspect in the string of unsolved murders.

In September 1975, Bundy telephoned Rule from Salt Lake, requesting help via her police department contacts to know why police in Seattle were serving subpoenas for his school records from Utah. He did not mention that in August 1975 he had been arrested and charged with the November 1974 kidnapping of a young woman who had been abducted by a man who posed as a police officer in Murray, Utah. After a bench trial, Bundy was sentenced to 1 to 15 years in Utah.

He was extradited to Colorado to face murder charges, but Rule was still resistant to admitting that her friend was a possible killer. Bundy twice escaped from custody in Colorado, sending letters or postcards to Rule while on the run. He proclaimed his innocence and asked for money to help enter Canada. The fugitive eventually made his way to Florida.

In January 1978, he went on a rampage at a Chi Omega sorority house at Florida State University, beating several women (two of whom later died). This incident here is narrated in third person, but not omnisciently, as the perpetrator is not identified as being Bundy, thus keeping the documentation of these events in-sync with the knowledge available to officers at the time Rule wrote. Bundy went on to attack another adult woman, and also confessed to the rape and murder of a 12-year-old girl whom was snatched from outside her school after the Chi Omega attack.

It is not until Bundy's capture in February 1978, and his subsequent trials in Florida when he represented himself in court, that Rule fully accepts that Bundy is a serial killer. The turning point came after forensic dentists testified that Bundy's teeth matched the deep bite mark on the body of one of the Florida State victims. This was the first physical evidence that definitely linked him to the crimes, making it impossible for Rule to maintain doubt about his guilt. Rule finds the idea shocking to the point that she "[runs] to the ladies room and throws up."

Rule later describes the trial of Bundy for the murder of 12-year-old Kimberly Leach in Florida. Bundy was sentenced to death in Florida. He continued to assert innocence for years, but shortly before execution confessed to over 30 murders in an apparent bid to delay his death.

The 1989 update outlines Bundy's execution, and the 2000 update touches on many things, including various women claiming to have encountered Bundy in the 1970s, Robert Keppel's retirement from detective work and his employment at the University of Washington, and Bundy's possible involvement in the unsolved disappearance of Ann Marie Burr, a girl who disappeared in 1961 when Bundy was 14.

A 2008 update of the book includes more stories from women who have contacted Rule with stories of their "near-miss" contacts with a man they believe was Ted Bundy, and also a "Ted Bundy FAQ" section in which Rule, among other things, includes the fact that he was not responsible for the 1973 murder of Kathy Merry Devine, for which he was long suspected. DNA profiling linked that killing to William Cosden, an ex-convict who was subsequently tried and convicted of her murder.

== Film adaptation ==
In 2003, The Stranger Beside Me was adapted into a made-for-TV film starring Billy Campbell as Bundy and Barbara Hershey as Rule.
