= List of Lily Collins performances =

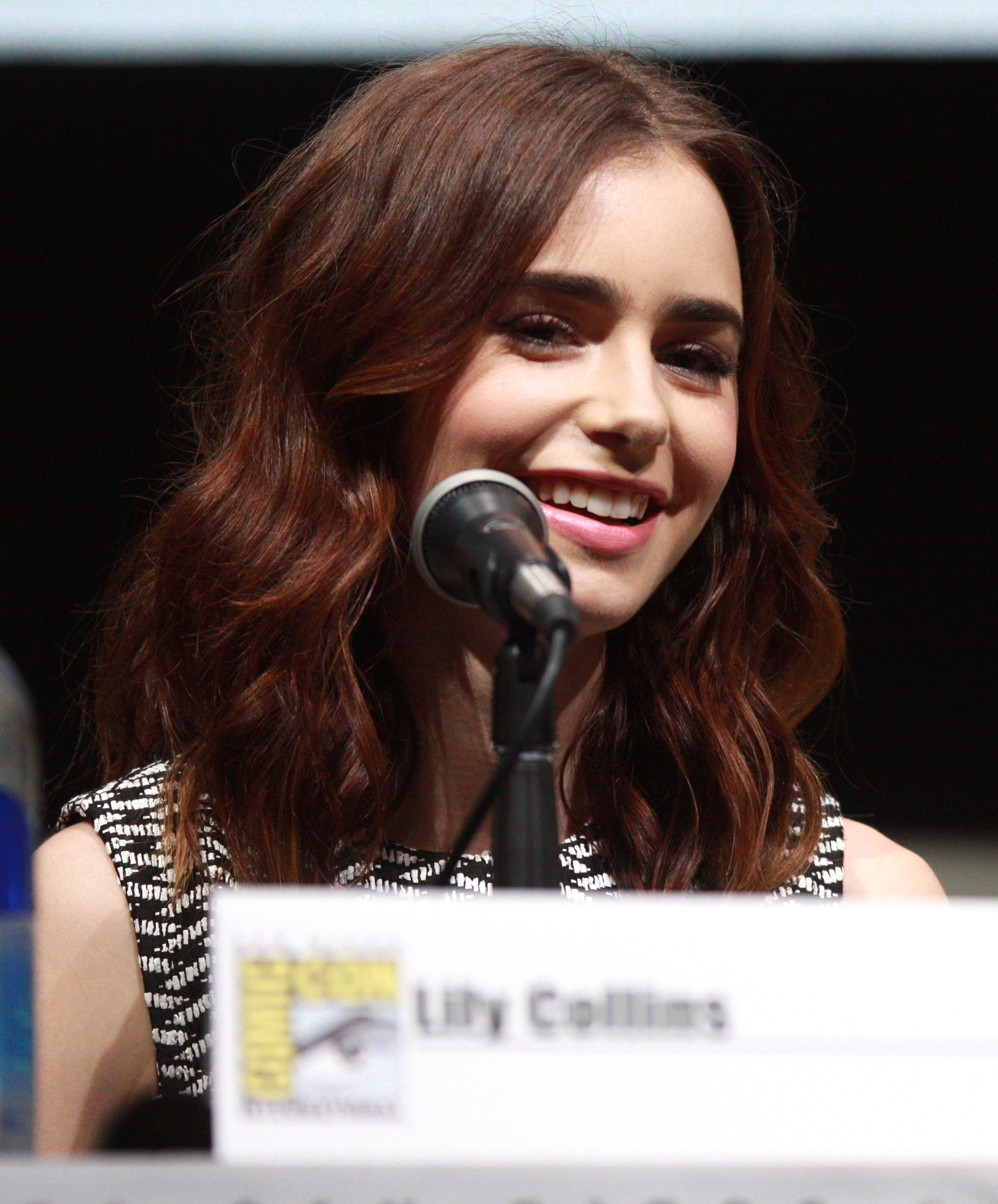
Collins at the 2013 San Diego Comic-Con.

Lily Collins is an English-American actress. She made her acting debut in the sitcom Growing Pains. She appeared in leading roles in the sci-fi action-horror film Priest (2011) and the fantasy Mirror Mirror (2012) in the role of Snow White. In 2013, starred in the role of Clary Fray in the fantasy The Mortal Instruments: City of Bones, for which she was nominated for the Teen Choice Award for Choice Movie Actress – Action and an MTV Movie Award. In 2016, she was nominated for a Golden Globe Award for her role as Marla Mabrey in Rules Don't Apply. She starred as Fantine in the BBC miniseries adaptation of Les Misérables (2018–2019), and in 2019 appeared in two biographical films, the Netflix drama Extremely Wicked, Shockingly Evil and Vile, and as Edith Tolkien in Tolkien.

== Film ==
| Year | Film | Role | Notes | Ref. |
|---|---|---|---|---|
| 1999 | Tarzan | Baby Ape | Voice | |
| 2009 | The Blind Side | Collins Tuohy | | |
| 2011 | Priest | Lucy Pace | | |
| 2011 | Abduction | Karen Murphy | | |
| 2012 | Mirror Mirror | Snow White | | |
| 2012 | Stuck in Love | Samantha Borgens | | |
| 2013 | The English Teacher | Halle Anderson | | |
| 2013 | The Mortal Instruments: City of Bones | Clary Fray | | |
| 2014 | Love, Rosie | Rosie Dunne | | |
| 2016 | Rules Don't Apply | Marla Mabrey | | |
| 2017 | To the Bone | Ellen ("Eli") | | |
| 2017 | Okja | Red | | |
| 2018 | Here Comes the Grump | Princess Dawn | Voice role | |
| 2019 | Extremely Wicked, Shockingly Evil and Vile | Elizabeth "Liz" Kendall | | |
| 2019 | Tolkien | Edith Bratt | | |
| 2020 | Inheritance | Lauren Monroe | | |
| 2020 | Mank | Rita Alexander | | |
| 2022 | Windfall | Wife | Also producer | |
| 2024 | MaXXXine | Molly Bennett | | |
| 2024 | The Summer Book | —N/a | Executive producer | |
| 2025 | Lurker | —N/a | Executive producer | |
| TBA | Close Personal Friends † | TBA | Post-production | |

== Television ==
| Year | Title | Role | Notes | Ref. |
|---|---|---|---|---|
| 1991 | Growing Pains | Two and a half year old girl | | |
| 2009 | 90210 | Phoebe Abrams | 2 episodes | |
| 2016–2017 | The Last Tycoon | Cecelia Brady | Main role; 9 episodes | |
| 2018–2019 | Les Misérables | Fantine | Miniseries; 3 episodes | |
| 2020–2026 | Emily in Paris | Emily Cooper | Lead role; 50 episodes, also producer | |
| 2021 | Calls | Camilla | Voice; Episode: "The End" | |
| 2021 | Curb Your Enthusiasm | Herself | Episode: "The Mormon Advantage" | |

== Music videos ==
| Year | Title | Role | Artist |
|---|---|---|---|
| 2013 | "Claudia Lewis" | Alien Girl | M83 |
| 2013 | "City of Angels" | Herself | Thirty Seconds to Mars |
| 2019 | "Save Me Tonight" | New Girl | ARTY |
