= Kidult =

Adult with childlike interests

A kidult is an adult whose interests or media consumption is traditionally seen as more suitable for children or adolescents. It can also mean a parent who acts childishly with their children and does not take on their duties as a disciplinarian.

Most kidults tend to use their interests as a form of escapism, or as a break from their stressful adult lifestyle. There has been a significant increase in this due to the high pressure found in modern living and conditions. While the term is often used in a derogatory manner, the figure of the kidult challenges both hierarchies between children and adults and heteronormative family structures.

Similar portmanteau terms for such people are rejuvenile and adultescent. A related concept is that of Peter Pan syndrome, where a person is reluctant to grow emotionally after childhood.

== History ==
The concept of "Peter Pan syndrome" or "puer aeternus" refers to individuals who resist or avoid the responsibilities and challenges associated with adulthood, choosing to remain in a state of emotional or psychological immaturity. The name is derived from the archetypal literary eternal boy, Peter Pan. In connection to this concept, the idea of departing "Neverland" mirrors the reluctance to embrace the inevitability of growing up.

The term kidult was first used in the 1950s by the television industry to refer to adult viewers who enjoyed television programs targeted at children. Thunderbirds, for example, was designed specifically to capitalize on this "kidult" demographic and aired in the evening rather than in the afternoon to accomplish this.

One of the most well-known and extreme cases of Peter Pan syndrome and the kidult mentality was of Michael Jackson. Jackson had explicitly stated that he did not want to grow up, and owned a large collection of arcade games, toy cars, and fantasy and sci-fi memorabilia. Michael also had a fascination with the Peter Pan character and attempted to create a theme park on his property called Neverland Ranch.

=== Modern usage ===
In the early 21st century, there was a sudden increase in reporting that for an adult to have interests traditionally expected only from children is not necessarily an anomaly. This is mostly due to the rise of the entertainment industry. The entertainment industry was quick to recognize the trend, and introduced a special category, "kidult", of things marketable for kids and adults alike.

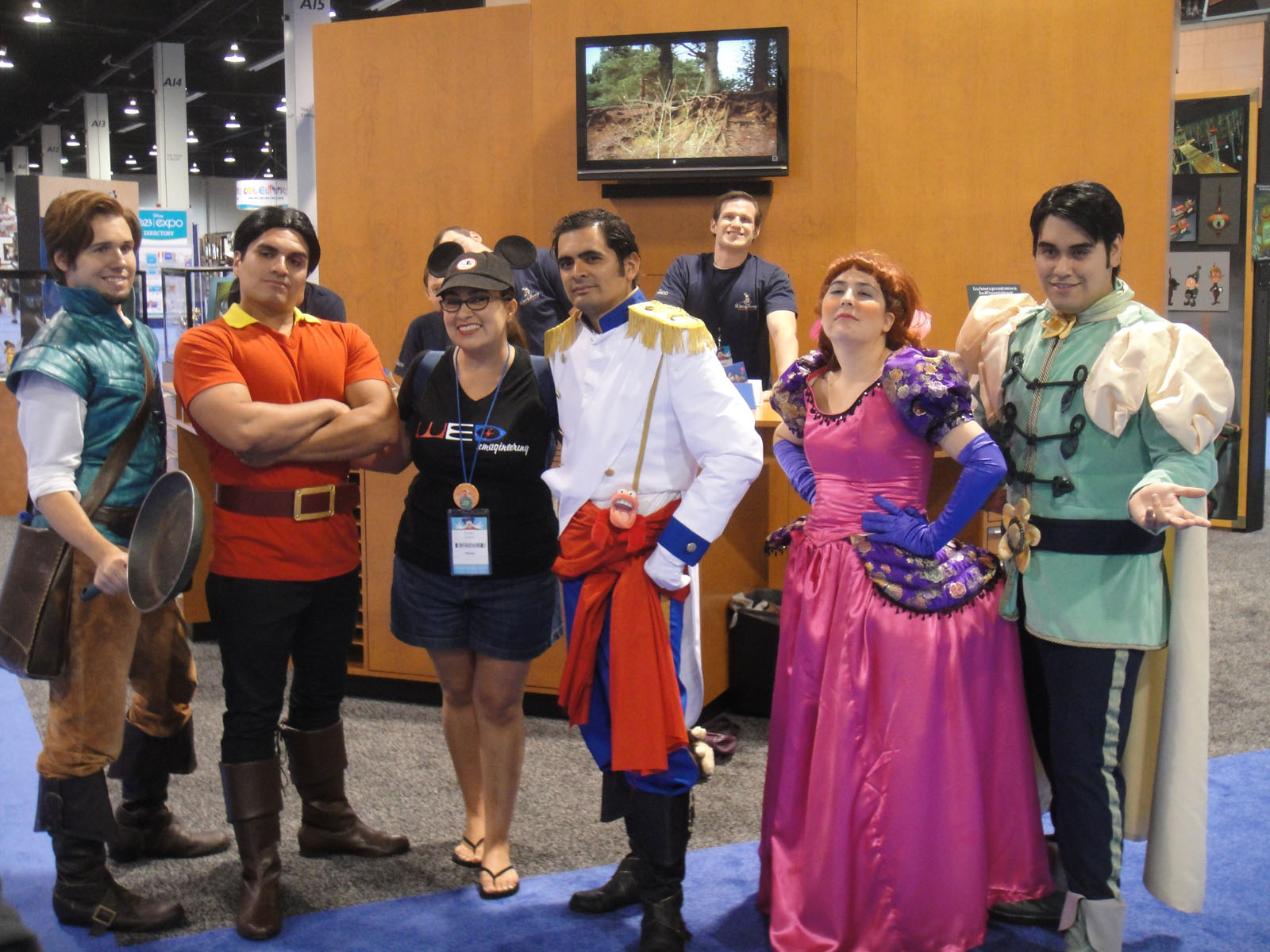
Adult members of the public cosplaying as various Disney characters at the D23 Expo

Enormous successes of films such as Shrek and Harry Potter; of animated television series such as My Little Pony: Friendship Is Magic, targeted at young girls; of young adult fiction books traditionally targeted for teenagers; and the fact that Disneyland is among the world's top adult (without kids) vacation destinations seem to indicate that "kidulthood" is a rather mainstream phenomenon, and unlike puer aeternus, "rejuveniles" successfully marry adult responsibilities with non-adult interests. When Christopher Noxon appeared on The Colbert Report on June 29, 2006, to promote his book Rejuvenile, he remarked that "there's a big difference between childish and childlike". This distinction is also made by Alemany Oliver and Belk in their interdisciplinary study of childlikeness.

Karen Brooks has written about what she calls the "commodification of youth": entertainers sell "the teen spirit" to adults who in the past were called "young at heart".

In South Korea, the buzzword 키덜트; kideolteu was used in 2015, highlighting the market trend of increasing toy sales (such as drones and "electric wheels") to adults. Between 2020 and 2022, there was a reported 37% growth in toy sales in the United States, with adults purchasing more toys during the COVID-19 pandemic. In 2025, a survey conducted by Happinet suggested that Japan has around 5.35 million people aged 18–60 who fall into the so-called kidult demographic, estimating that the kidult market has reached 78 billion yen.

Toy sales in the US surged 37% between 2020 and 2022 according to a Bloomberg study. Though toy industry executives initially attributed this surge to parents purchasing toys for children undergoing COVID lockdowns, a Toy Association survey found that 58% of adult respondents had also acquired toys and games for their personal use during this same period.

More recently, the release of the Barbie movie in 2023 as well as the sudden popularity in the Barbiecore aesthetic and a general boost in adoration of the franchise has sparked a wave of people, specifically women, reconnecting with their youth and their childhoods. The overwhelming success of the film has led to an increase in adults attempting to "heal" their inner child, driven by nostalgia.

== Kidult fashion ==
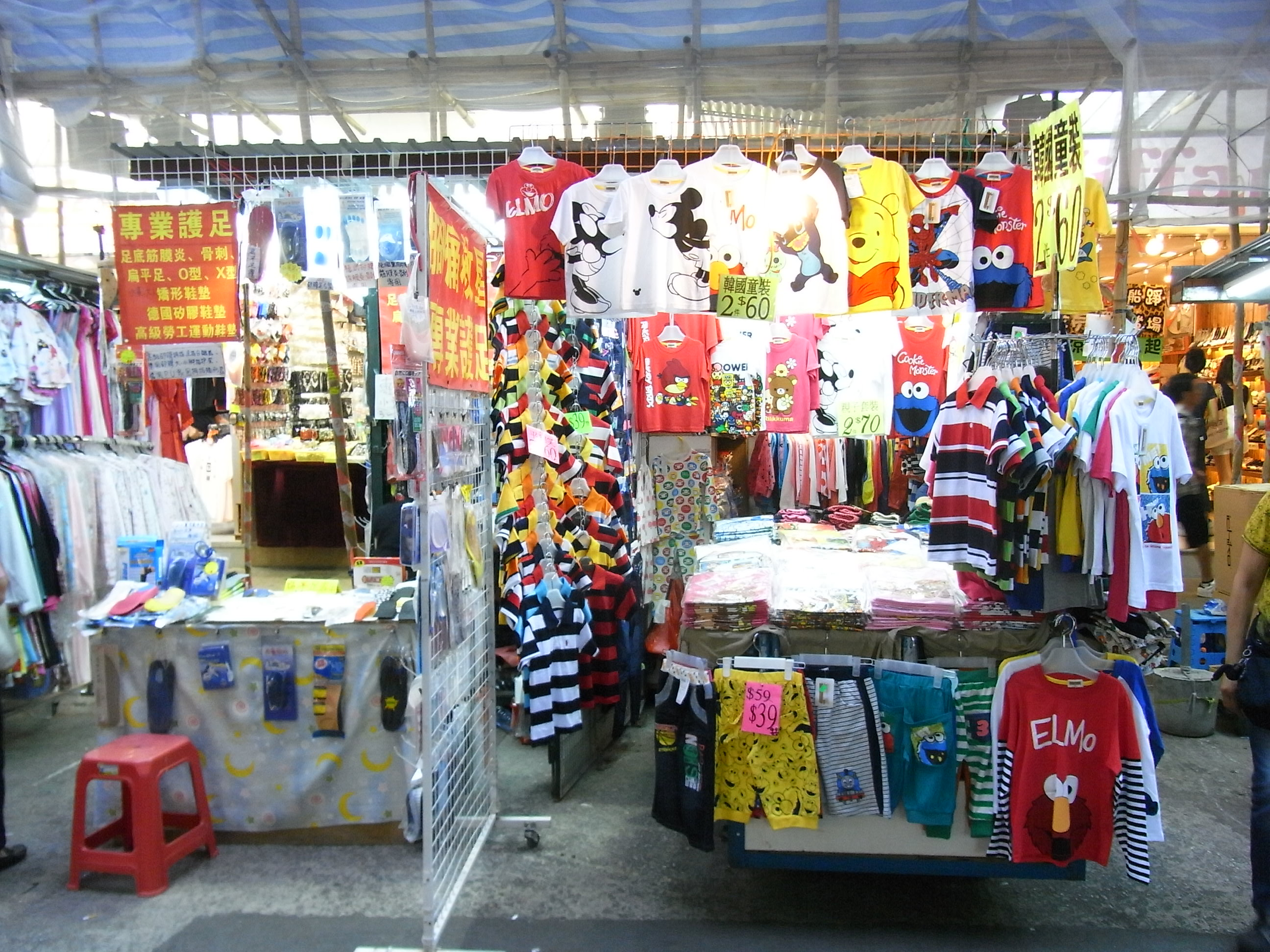
Kidults in South Korea and London Cutesters often wore cartoon character shirts like these.

The precursor to kidult fashion (also known as kidcore) is Japanese "kawaii" street fashion of the 1970s–1990s. This street fashion was highly influenced by Japanese nostalgia of the era. Due to cultural differences, much of contemporary kidcore fashion looks different from kawaii. However, the core desire to rebel against gender roles and reject social expectations is fundamentally unchanged in contemporary kidcore and its other predecessors.

Mentions of kidult fashion in South Korea exist in the research as far back as 2002 though it is unclear how popular it was at the time. One paper from 2016 analyzes the kidult trend in Korean women's fashion in a time frame that spans between 2006 and 2015. Designers studied in this article were primarily based out of New York, France, and Italy, suggesting cultural exchange as an influence on this trend. Mid-2000s and 2010s South Korean kidult fashion focused heavily on famous logos and cartoons, as well as toys. By 2016, K-pop celebrities like Exo were wearing cartoon-oriented graphic tees.

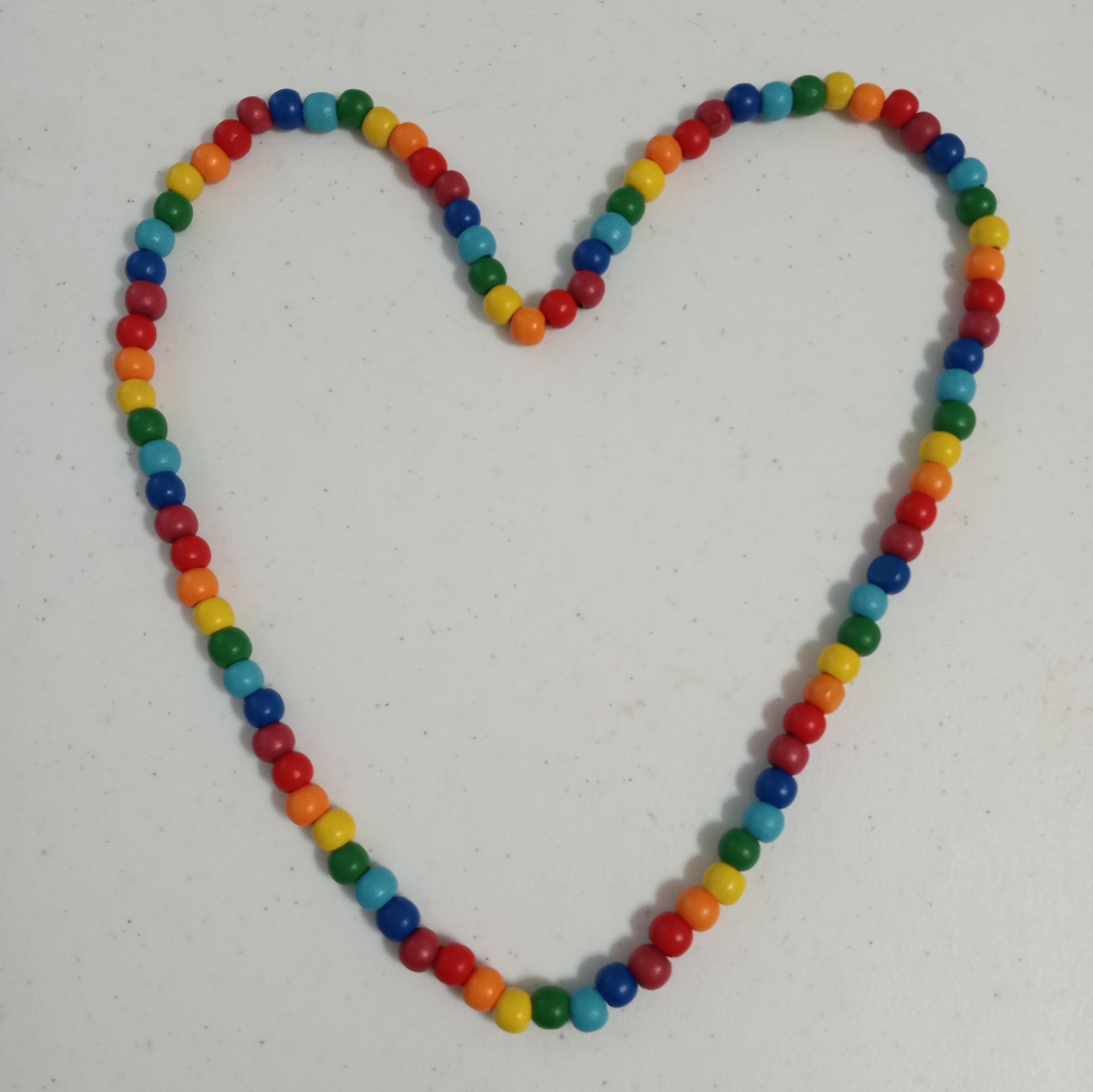
Kidult jewelry was often inspired by simplistic costume jewelry worn in childhood, such as this rainbow beaded necklace.

Other mid-2010s adopters of this trend were those from the nu-rave subculture in London. People involved in this subculture wore slogan tees, cut-off shorts, hair scrunchies, skinny jeans and hoodies. Clothing that contained cartoon characters were common. These outfits were typically worn during kidult activities, such as dance parties with floors filled with inflatable toys and breakfast cereal cafés.

In the late 2010s, kidult fashion saw a shift from cartoon t shirts and casual wear to a more holistic embrace of youthful femininity, particularly based out of candy, feminine toys like Polly Pockets, and 1990s/early 2000s nostalgia.

Accessories like friendship bracelets, beaded jewelry, hair clips, and childlike purses were part of the trend. Celebrity men like Ryan Reynolds, Harry Styles, Bad Bunny, and Frank Ocean were seen wearing beaded kidult jewelry in the 2020s. E-girls and e-boys were also known to embrace youthful fashions at this time, but their sense of style was more influenced by scene and emo subcultures of the 2000s, 1990s grunge, cosplay, anime, K-pop and Japanese street fashion.

One of the more recent examples of kidult fashion is the Sylvie-Bag by Gucci made out of Lego by the Chinese artist Andy Hung.

== See also ==
- Boomerang Generation
- Disney adults
- Fandom
- Lego fandom
- Otaku
- Youth subculture
- Infantilization
- Age regression in hypnotherapy
- Infantilism
- Ageplay
