= Carol Flax =

- Education: Heidelberg College University of Michigan
- Occupation: Artist
- Years active: (2013 - Present)
- Known for: Cut Paper Mosaics

Carol Flax is an American artist who specializes in representational collage, or “Cut Paper Mosaics” as she describes. Flax lives in Yarmouth, Massachusetts, on the Cape Cod peninsula where she finds inspiration in the surrounding landscape like Gray's beach and Lewis Bay.

== Early life and education ==
Flax received a BA in English from Heidelberg College and an MA in Speech & Theater from the University of Michigan. It was during her college years that she initially developed her cut paper style, but at the urging of her father to pursue a more stable career, Flax went on to become an English and theater teacher, and eventually moved into marketing and communications. Flax worked in various institutions such as the University of Albany and Ohio Northern University until she retired in 2012.

== Artistic career ==
After reviving her artistic style in 2013, Flax's work began to grow more in popularity, earning her artist memberships of: Fuller Craft Museum, the Provicetown Art Association and Museum, the Cotuit Center for the Arts, The Cultural Center of Cape Cod, Cape Cod Museum of Art, Falmouth Art Center, and the Arts Foundation of Cape Cod. She also is an Elected Member of Audubon Artists, Inc. at the Salmagundi Club, NYC. Flax, alongside Christine Anderson, Lisa Horton, and Toni Newhall, are members of Fiber Fusion; a group of fiber artists/friends whose work seeks to expand the definition of contemporary fiber art by integrating materials other that what is normally expected in the genre. Flax's work is also featured in a children's book titled, “If I Were a Bumblebee” which was published on April 20, 2021.

=== Technique ===
Flax is considered a visual artist for her work in representational collage. This is a style that she created in her twenties, but did not receive any recognition for at the time. The artist describes her own process, calling it “Cut Paper Mosaics," where she essentially recycles paper from materials such as magazines. She then cuts the paper and glues pieces to her surface of choice, often a collage board, using a brush-stroke pattern to create the illusion of a painting.

== Awards ==
Most notably, Flax received the Audubon Artists Silver Medal of Honor in 2016 for her collage Mayflower Beach iii. Add

Also, she won the Work on Paper Prize for her painting Gray’s Beach Low Tide in the 2014 National Prize Show, juried by James Welu.
