= Nicolas Noxon =

American documentary filmmaker

- Born: Nicolas Lane Noxon; July 29, 1936; London, England
- Died: May 3, 2016 (aged 79); Westlake Village, California U.S.
- Occupation: Documentary filmmaker
- Years active: 1967-2016
- Notable work: Secrets of the Titanic
- Children: 4, including Marti and Christopher Noxon
- Parent(s): Betty Lane; Gerald Noxon

Nicolas Lane Noxon (July 29, 1936 – May 3, 2016) was an American documentary filmmaker. He specialized in television programs dealing with history, science, and the natural world. Noxon produced television specials and series in association with ABC, David Wolper, Columbia Pictures Television, Metromedia, MGM, Survival Anglia, Time-Life, and National Geographic Television.

== Early life ==
Noxon was born in 1936 in London, England, to a Canadian father, the writer and filmmaker Gerald Forbes Noxon, and an American mother, the painter Betty Lane. He emigrated to the United States when he was less than a year and a half.

Noxon graduated from the private boarding school The Putney School. In 1959, he received his B.A. from Antioch College.

== Career ==
Noxon began his work on the National Geographic Specials in the mid-60s, producing and writing three of the first programs when they premiered on CBS.

In 1967 he was co-founder of the Documentary Department at MGM, the first such organization in a major movie studio. There he produced and supervised many natural history documentaries as well as films on such diverse subjects as archaeology, forest fires, the history of the movies and early child development.

In 1978 Noxon returned to Geographic where he wrote and produced the Emmy Award winning documentary "The Great Whales" and "The Sharks", one of the highest rated programs ever aired on PBS. He wrote and produced "Last Stand in Eden" about the conflict between wildlife and humans in Kenya, which aired in 1979. In 1982 he became a writer-producer on the series Ripley's Believe It or Not! which ran for four years on ABC. In 1986, he took part in Robert Ballard's expedition to explore the wreck of the Titanic. The film that resulted, Secrets of the Titanic, was for years the best-selling documentary released on videocassette and the original inspiration for James Cameron's feature film.

In 1991 Noxon became Executive Producer of the National Geographic Specials and head of Geographic's West Coast production facility. Productions he supervised there have included "Wolves Of The Sea" and "Dragons Of Galapagos" both winners of the prestigious Golden Panda at the Wildscreen Film Festival, "Heroes of the High Frontier", awarded the Emmy Award for best informational or cultural special of 1999-2000 and "Adventures in Time", the two-hour National Geographic Millennium Special which achieved winning ratings and critical acclaim on NBC.

Noxon has long been associated with the National Geographic Specials, a series which has aired on the major television networks and which have been considered among the most popular group of programs aired on PBS.

== Honors ==
His productions won many awards in television including several Emmys and numerous international honors. In 2009 he received the International Documentary Association Pioneer Award, which is presented annually to an individual who has made an indelible impression on the evolving art and craft of nonfiction filmmaking.

Over the years the specials have won more than 400 awards including 58 Emmy Awards, four George Foster Peabody awards and two Dupont Columbia awards for Broadcast Journalism.

== Personal life ==
In 1974, Noxon divorced Mary Straley, with whom he had had four children. In 1978, Noxon married Nicky Nicholass.
