= Elizabeth Kloepfer =

American author and memoirist (born 1946)

- Born: Elizabeth Hirst; December 31, 1946 (age 79); Brigham City, Utah, U. S.
- Other names: Elizabeth Kendall; Liz Kendall; Meg Anders; Beth Archer
- Education: Utah State University
- Occupations: Author; Memoirist; Administrative assistant
- Years active: 1981 – present
- Spouse(s): David Kloepfer (m. 1965; div. 1968) Manus Mulligan (m. 1978; div. 1981)
- Partner: Ted Bundy (1969–1976)
- Children: 1

Elizabeth "Liz" Kloepfer (born 1946), also known by her pen name Elizabeth Kendall, is an American author and memoirist. She had a long-term relationship with serial killer Ted Bundy and wrote the memoir, The Phantom Prince: My Life with Ted Bundy (1981). Her account provided a look into Bundy's "normal" facade and served as the primary source for several major media adaptations.

== Early life and education ==
Elizabeth Hirst was born in 1946 in Brigham City, Utah. She was the youngest of four children born to Russell Nelson Hirst, a prominent local physician, and Verna Petersen, a nurse. She grew up in Ogden alongside three siblings: Steven Tarry Hirst, Suzanne Hirst (Trull), and Russell Nelson Hirst Jr.

She attended Utah State University, where she earned a degree in business. Shortly after graduation, she married David Joseph Kloepfer (1965–1968). The marriage ended in divorce after she discovered his criminal history. In 1969, seeking a fresh start, she moved to Seattle with her three-year-old daughter, Molly Jane Kloepfer, and began working as a secretary at the University of Washington School of Medicine.

== Relationship with Ted Bundy ==
In October 1969, Kloepfer met Ted Bundy at the Sandpiper Tavern in Seattle. The two began a tumultuous relationship that lasted nearly seven years. Bundy became a central figure in the life of Kloepfer's daughter, Molly, acting as a surrogate father from the time she was three until age ten.

=== Suspicions and police reports ===
Between 1974 and 1975, as news of missing women in the Pacific Northwest circulated, Kloepfer became increasingly suspicious. She noted several "red flags," including a composite sketch of a suspect named "Ted" who drove a Volkswagen Beetle, and her discovery of a hatchet, a bag of surgical gloves, and a bowl of plaster of Paris in Bundy's car. She noticed Bundy's frequent disappearances at night.

Kloepfer contacted the Seattle Police Department on three occasions to report her boyfriend. However, investigators initially dismissed her tips, as Bundy had no prior criminal record and did not fit their profile of a killer at the time.

=== Attempted murder ===
In later confessions, Bundy admitted to Kloepfer that he had once attempted to kill her. While she was sleeping after a night of drinking, Bundy closed the fireplace damper and stuffed a towel under her bedroom door to trap smoke in the room. Kloepfer awoke coughing and opened the windows, unaware at the time that the incident was a deliberate murder attempt.

=== The Final Break and later marriages ===
Kloepfer maintained sporadic contact with Bundy through his initial incarceration in Utah in 1976. The final break occurred on February 16, 1978, at 5:00 PM, when Bundy called her from a jail in Florida following his final arrest. During the call, he admitted he was "sick" and controlled by a "force". Kloepfer subsequently cut off all communication, refusing to answer his letters and acknowledge him until his execution in 1989.

In September 1978, she married Manus Michael Mulligan. The marriage ended in divorce in June 1981.

=== Later life ===
She has since maintained a private life in Washington, where she has been open about her 40-year sobriety.

== Literary work ==
Under the pseudonym Elizabeth Kendall, she published The Phantom Prince in 1981. The book fell out of print for decades but was reissued in an expanded edition in 2020, featuring a new chapter by her daughter, Molly.

Molly's updated account detailed previously undisclosed abuse, including incidents where Bundy hit her, exposed himself to her, and put her at risk of drowning during her childhood.

== Personal life ==
Kloepfer has been open about her recovery from alcoholism, which she struggled with during her years with Bundy. She lives a private life in Washington state and has stated that her 2020 media appearances were likely her last.

== In popular culture ==
- Her 1981 book The Phantom Prince was reissued in an expanded edition in 2020 with additional content from her daughter.
- She was portrayed by Botti Bliss in the 2002 film Ted Bundy.
- She was portrayed by Lily Collins in the 2019 film Extremely Wicked, Shockingly Evil and Vile.
- She appeared in the 2020 Amazon Prime Video docuseries Ted Bundy: Falling for a Killer.

== See also ==
- Ted Bundy

== General and cited sources ==
- Michaud, Stephen; Aynesworth, Hugh (August 1999) [1983]. The Only Living Witness: The True Story of Serial Sex Killer Ted Bundy (Paperback; revised ed.). Irving, Texas: Authorlink Press. ISBN 978-1-928704-11-9. Archived from the original on May 23, 2024.
- Kendall, Elizabeth (September 1981). The Phantom Prince: My Life With Ted Bundy (Hardcover, 1st ed.). Seattle, Washington: Madrona. ISBN 978-0-914842-70-5.(Elizabeth Kloepfer, writing under a pseudonym)
- Rule, Ann (2009). The Stranger Beside Me (Paperback; updated 2009 ed.). New York City: Pocket Books. ISBN 978-1-4165-5959-7.
- Sullivan, Kevin M. (2009). The Bundy Murders: A Comprehensive History (Paperback ed.). Jefferson, North Carolina: McFarland and Co. ISBN 978-0-7864-4426-7.
