= Christopher Noxon =

American journalist

- Born: Christopher Lane Noxon; November 21, 1968 (age 57); Los Angeles, California, U.S.
- Occupation(s): Writer, journalist
- Spouse: Jenji Kohan (m. 1997; div. 2018)
- Children: 3
- Parent(s): Nicolas Noxon; Mary Straley
- Relatives: Marti Noxon (sister); Betty Lane (paternal grandmother)

Christopher Lane Noxon (born November 21, 1968) is an American writer, artist, and freelance journalist.

== Early life ==
Noxon was born in Los Angeles, California, to National Geographic documentary filmmaker father, Nicolas Noxon, and Mary Straley. His grandmother was painter Betty Lane.

== Career ==
Noxon began his career at the Los Angeles Daily News. His assignments have included the Democratic National Convention for Reuters and a Playboy feature about drug rehab. Noxon has also written for Los Angeles magazine, The Huffington Post, Salon.com, and also The New Yorker magazine, The Atlantic magazine, and The New York Times Magazine.

His first book was Rejuvenile. The book, which grew out of a story he wrote for The New York Times, was reviewed in BusinessWeek, The New York Sun and covered by The Today Show, Good Morning America and NPR. Noxon appeared on Bill Maher's "Fishbowl" and Comedy Central's "The Colbert Report".

Noxon worked as a music consultant on the Showtime series Weeds, in which copies of his book Rejuvenile appear as a prop in some scenes.

== Personal life ==
In 1997, Noxon married television writer Jenji Kohan, and is the brother of writer Marti Noxon. Kohan and Noxon had three children. Their firstborn died at age 20 on a skiing accident while on a family holiday trip on the last day of 2019. They lived in the Los Feliz section of Los Angeles, California and later moved to Ojai, California, when he decided to start painting full time. He is a convert to Judaism. Kohan and her family are Jewish.

== Works and publications ==
- Noxon, Christopher. "I don't want to grow up!" Miller, D. Quentin. The Generation of Ideas: A Thematic Reader. Boston, Mass: Thomson/Wadsworth, 2005. ISBN 978-1-413-00012-2 OCLC 57505721
- Noxon, Christopher. Rejuvenile Kickball, Cartoons, Cupcakes, and the Reinvention of the American Grown-Up. New York: Crown Publishers, 2006. ISBN 978-0-307-35177-7 OCLC 647131378
- Noxon, Christopher. Plus One: A Novel. Altadena, California: Prospect Park Books, 2015. ISBN 978-1-938-84943-5 OCLC 900723329
- Noxon, Christopher. Good Trouble: Lessons from the Civil Rights Playbook. NY: Abrams, 2018. ISBN 9781419732355, 1419732358
