= Lily Collins =

English and American actress (born 1989)

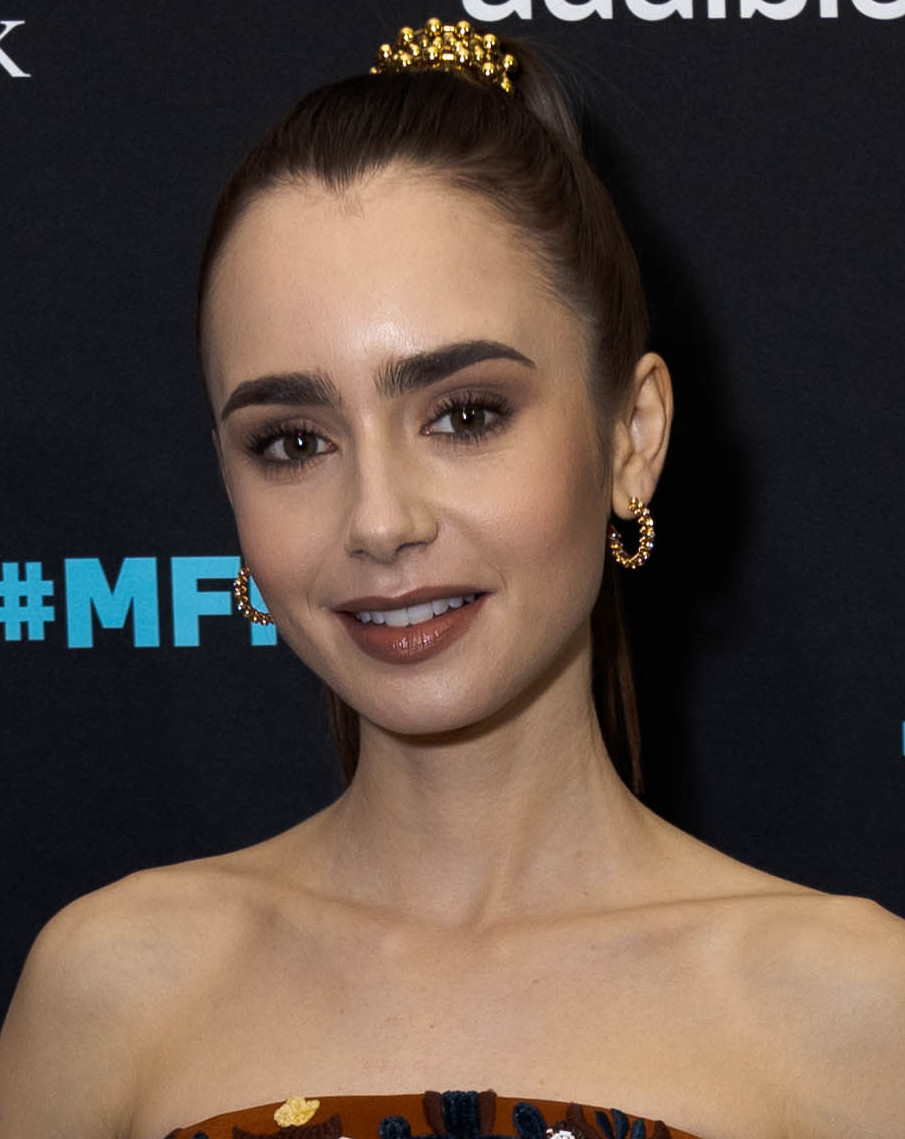
- Collins in 2019
- Born: Lily Jane Collins; 18 March 1989 (age 37); Guildford, Surrey, England
- Citizenship: United Kingdom; United States
- Occupation: Actress
- Years active: 1991–present
- Works: Full list
- Spouse: Charlie McDowell (m. 2021)
- Children: 1
- Father: Phil Collins
- Relatives: Simon Collins (half-brother); Joely Collins (half-sister); Nic Collins (half-brother); Mathew Collins (half-brother); Clive Collins (uncle); Malcolm McDowell (father-in-law); Mary Steenburgen (mother-in-law); Ted Danson (stepfather-in law)

Lily Jane Collins (born 18 March 1989) is an English and American actress. Born in Guildford and raised in Los Angeles, she began performing on screen at the age of two in the BBC sitcom Growing Pains. In the late 2000s, she began acting and modelling more regularly, and gained recognition for her supporting role in the sports drama film The Blind Side (2009). She went on to star in several films, including the horror film Priest (2011), the thriller Abduction (2011), and the fantasy films Mirror Mirror (2012) and The Mortal Instruments: City of Bones (2013).

Collins was critically acclaimed for her portrayals of a young actress in the romantic comedy Rules Don't Apply (2016), for which she was nominated for a Golden Globe Award for Best Actress, and a young adult with anorexia in the drama To the Bone (2017). She appeared in the biopics Extremely Wicked, Shockingly Evil and Vile (2019), Tolkien (2019) and Mank (2020).

She played Fantine in the BBC miniseries Les Misérables (2018–2019), and since 2020 has portrayed marketing executive Emily Cooper in the Netflix romantic comedy series Emily in Paris, for which she was nominated for the Golden Globe Award for Best Actress – Television Series Musical or Comedy and the Primetime Emmy Award for Outstanding Comedy Series (as producer). She has written the memoir Unfiltered: No Shame, No Regrets, Just Me (2017), discussing her struggles with mental health and body image.

== Early life ==
Lily Jane Collins was born on 18 March 1989, the daughter of English musician Phil Collins and his second wife, Jill Tavelman, an American who is the former president of the Beverly Hills Women's Club. Her maternal grandfather was a Canadian Jewish immigrant who for many years owned a men's clothing store in Beverly Hills, California.

After her parents' divorce in 1996 when she was seven, Collins moved to Los Angeles with her mother. She graduated from Harvard-Westlake School and attended the University of Southern California, majoring in broadcast journalism. She was presented as a debutante at the Bal des débutantes in Paris in 2007. As a teen, she suffered from an eating disorder that she later described in her autobiography Unfiltered: No Shame, No Regrets, Just Me.

== Career ==
=== 2007–2012: Early work and breakthrough ===
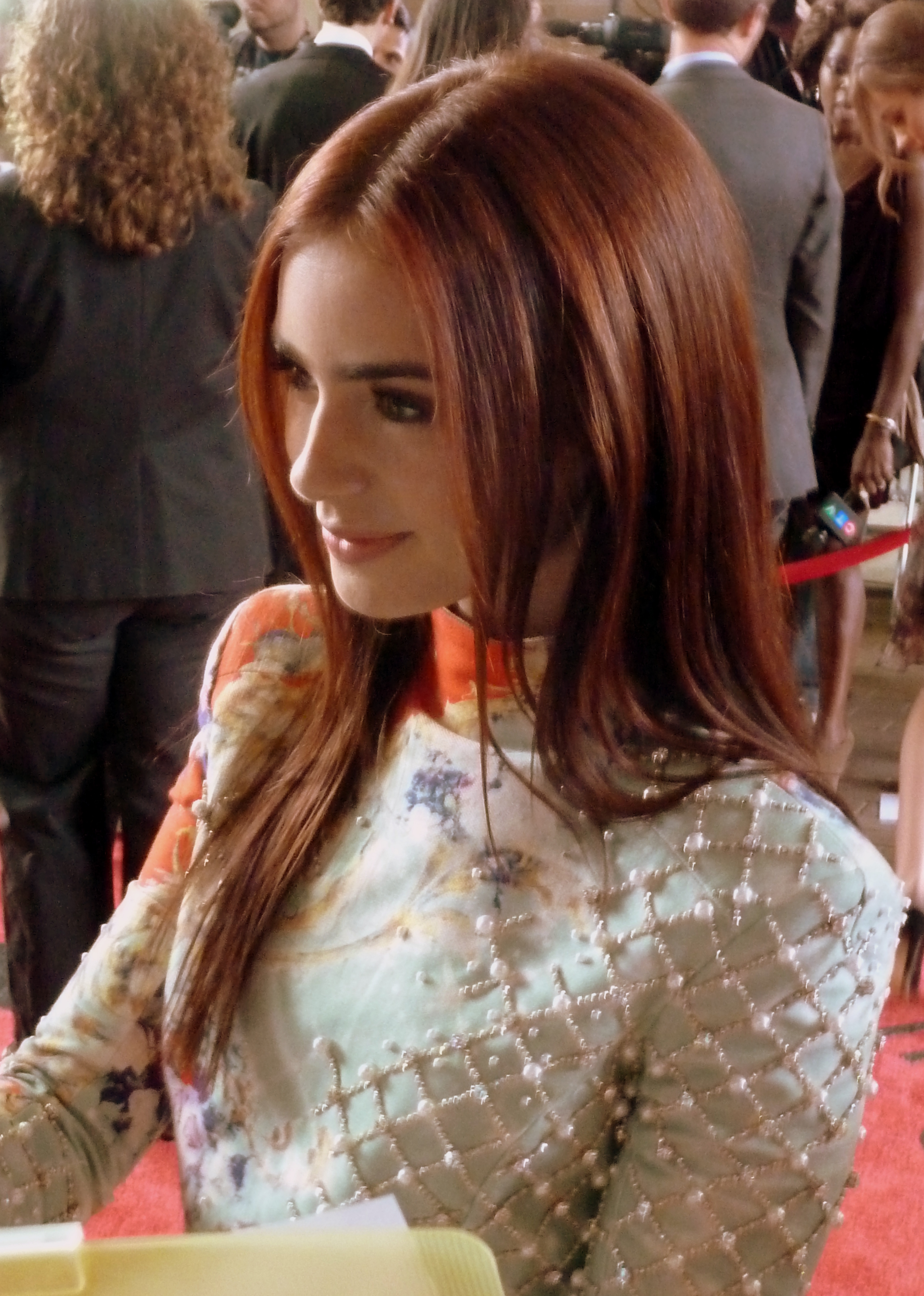
Collins at the 2012 Toronto International Film Festival

Collins began acting at the age of two in the BBC series Growing Pains. She appeared in two episodes of the teen drama series 90210, including the first season's finale. Later that year, she had her breakthrough starring in the film The Blind Side as Collins Tuohy, the daughter of Leigh Anne Tuohy (Sandra Bullock's character). It was a commercial success, grossing over $250 million and emerging as the highest-grossing sports drama of all time.

In 2011, she played the warrior priest's daughter Lucy in the thriller Priest, opposite Paul Bettany. Although it was a critical and commercial failure, she was praised for her performance, and MTV Networks' NextMovie.com named her one of the Breakout Stars to Watch for in 2011. She co-starred in the 2011 action film Abduction with Taylor Lautner.

In 2012, Collins played Snow White in Mirror Mirror, an adaptation of the fairytale Snow White and the Seven Dwarfs. Robbie Collin from the British newspaper The Daily Telegraph wrote of her: "She has an adorable, sensational, almost perfect face for cinema; think Audrey Hepburn with the eyebrows of Liam Gallagher. Her smile is the platonic ideal of cheeky." Collins made her singing debut in the film, performing an English rewritten cover of "I Believe (in Love)". Also in 2012, she portrayed Samantha in Stuck in Love.

=== 2013–2016: Rise to prominence and critical recognition ===
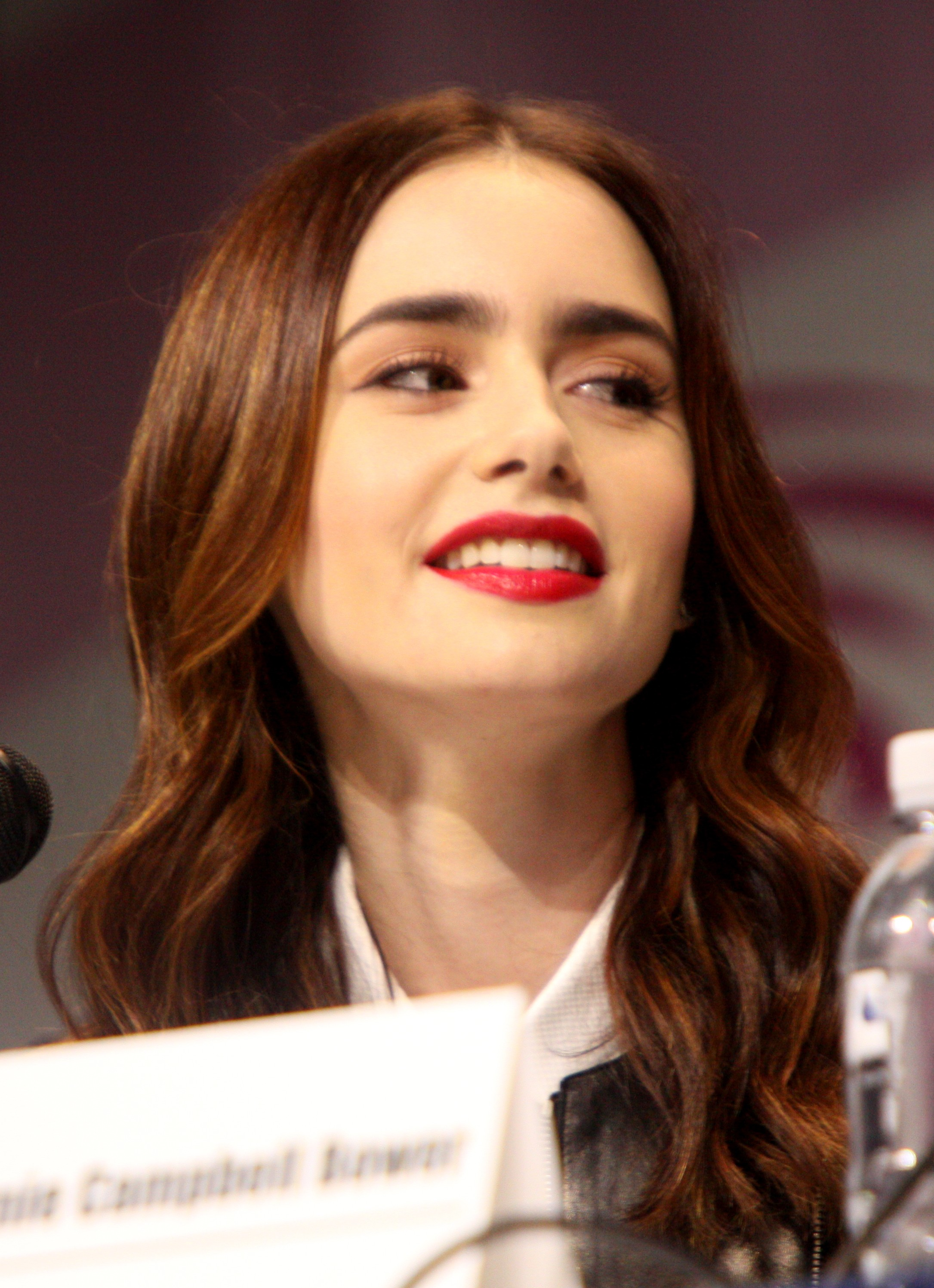
Collins at the 2013 WonderCon

Collins was initially cast as the lead in the 2013 remake of Evil Dead, but dropped out due to a scheduling issue. She played the title role as an earth-visiting alien in M83's music video "Claudia Lewis", released in August 2013. She starred as Clary Fray in The Mortal Instruments: City of Bones, a film adaptation of the first book in The Mortal Instruments novels, written by Cassandra Clare. The role earned her a Teen Choice Award nomination in 2014. In October 2013, Collins appeared in the music video for "City of Angels" by Thirty Seconds to Mars. In 2014, Collins starred as Rosie Dunne in the film adaptation of Love, Rosie, Love, Rosie was negatively received, although her performance was praised, with Donald Clarke of The Irish Times describing her as "perfectly charming."

Collins had a leading role as aspiring actress Marla Mabrey in the romantic comedy-drama Rules Don't Apply (2016). When the film was released in November, it received mixed reviews and grossed $3.9 million against its $25 million budget. Despite this, for her role as Marla Mabrey, Collins received her first Golden Globe nomination for Best Actress in a Comedy or Musical at the 74th Golden Globe Awards. In 2016, Collins was part of a pilot produced for The Last Tycoon, loosely based on F. Scott Fitzgerald's last book The Last Tycoon. Amazon picked up the pilot to series on 27 July 2016 but later cancelled their plans for a second season in September in 2017.

In March 2016, Collins joined the anorexia drama film To the Bone in the lead role, written and directed by Marti Noxon. The film follows Ellen, a 20-year-old woman suffering from anorexia nervosa. It premiered in competition at the Sundance Film Festival on 22 January 2017, as a contender in the U.S. Dramatic Competition. It was released worldwide on Netflix on 14 July 2017. When the film was released on Netflix there was some controversy about whether the film would be triggering for those with eating disorders. This controversy was also influenced by another Netflix original show 13 Reasons Why after it was accused of glamorising suicide. Despite the taboo topic of the film, Collins's depiction of Ellen was described as "exemplary work from Lily Collins in the central role." Justin Chang of Los Angeles Times wrote that "In a different film, Ellen's sharp tongue might have made her an insufferable fount of wisecracking negativity, but Collins' performance is subtler than that, and the script gives her ample opportunity to reveal the character's more complicated, vulnerable edges."

=== 2017–present: Established actress ===
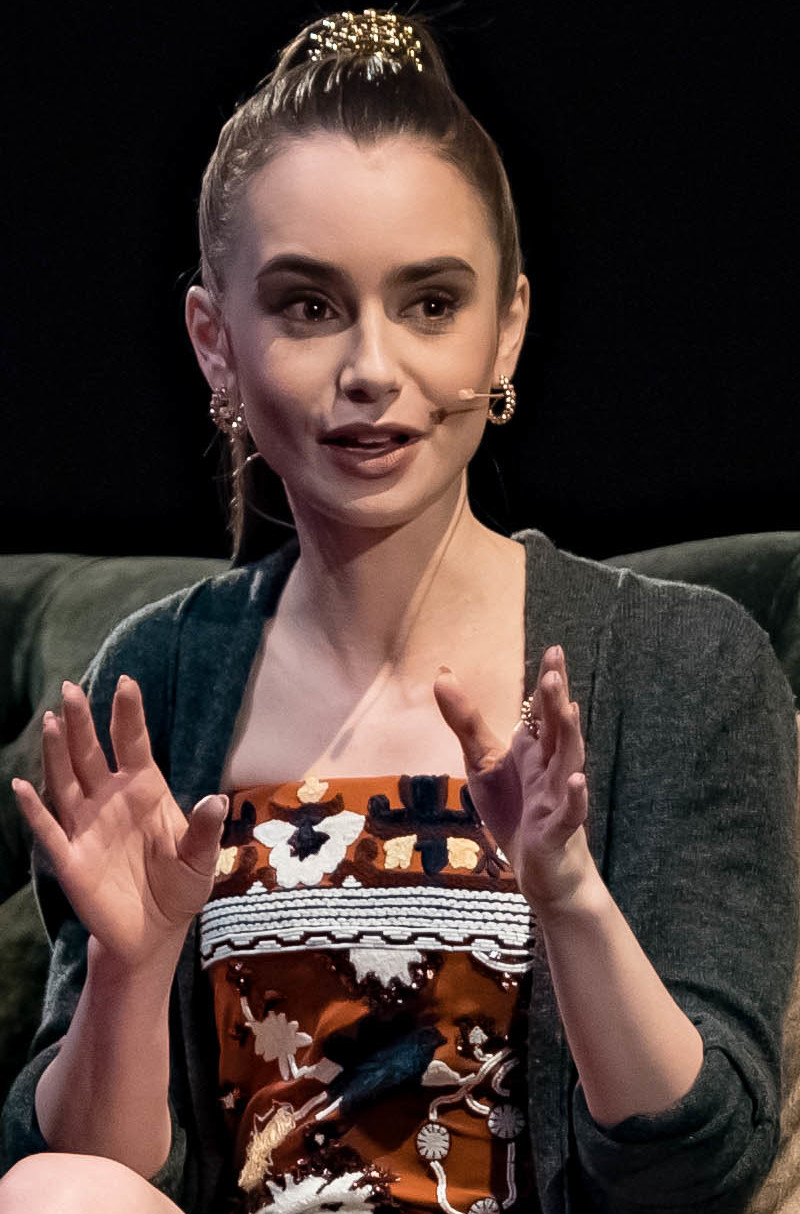
Collins in May 2019

Collins was cast in the Netflix drama film Okja directed by Bong Joon-ho. The film competed for the Palme d'Or in the main competition section at the 2017 Cannes Film Festival and received a four-minute standing ovation after its premiere. It was released on Netflix on 28 June 2017. In 2017, it was revealed that Les Misérables would be adapted by Andrew Davies into a BBC mini series directed by Tom Shankland. Collins starred as Fantine, a young woman in Paris who is abandoned by her wealthy lover, forcing her to look after their child, Cosette, on her own. Filming began in February 2018 in Belgium and Northern France. Critics praised Collins's performance as Fantine; Alexandra Pollard of The Independent wrote that "[Collins] plays the tragic Fantine with steeliness and grace," in a "magnificent" performance, while another critic stated that "Lily Collins does not sing her anguished soul out when she is abandoned by her lover. So much so, she impressed me from the get-go with her emotionally rich performance."

In 2019, Collins co-starred with Zac Efron in the drama Extremely Wicked, Shockingly Evil and Vile, directed by Joe Berlinger. She plays Elizabeth Kendall, Ted Bundy's long-time girlfriend, who struggles to accept that her boyfriend is a serial killer. The film had its world premiere at the Sundance Film Festival on 26 January. Also that year, Collins co-starred as Edith Tolkien, the wife of author J. R. R. Tolkien, in the biographical film Tolkien. Filming began in October 2017 and wrapped in December, and Tolkien was released on 10 May 2019.

In 2020, Collins starred in the thriller Inheritance directed by Vaughn Stein, and in Emily in Paris, a Netflix television series about a young American working in Paris. For Emily in Paris, Collins received a second Golden Globe Award nomination for Best Actress – Television Series Musical or Comedy. That same year, she portrayed Rita Alexander, an English transcriber to writer Herman J. Mankiewicz, in the critically acclaimed film Mank. Collins is scheduled to star in The Cradle directed by Hope Dickinson Leach, and in Gilded Rage, directed by Charlie McDowell.

In June 2021, it was announced that Collins would produce a film to be directed by Lena Dunham about the children's toy Polly Pocket. Collins will be playing the title role. In February 2026, it was announced that Collins would play Audrey Hepburn in a film about the making of the 1961 film Breakfast at Tiffany's.

In 2024, she made her West End debut in London, England in Bess Wohl's play Barcelona as Irene, opposite Álvaro Morte. She received critical praise for her performance, with The Standard praising her performance as "sensational" and noting that "her appearance generates a crackle of excitement."

== Public image ==
As a teenager, Collins wrote a column, "NY Confidential", for the British magazine Elle Girl. She has also written for Seventeen, Teen Vogue, and the Los Angeles Times. She was selected by Chanel to wear one of their gowns at the 2007 Bal des débutantes at the Hôtel de Crillon in Paris, which was featured on season three of the reality television series The Hills. She was picked by Spain's Glamour magazine in 2008 as its International Model of the Year, and appeared on the magazine's cover in August 2009.

Collins covered the 2008 US presidential election as a host on the Nickelodeon series Kids Pick the President. She won a 2008 Young Hollywood Award for Newest Red Carpet Correspondent. She was one of 20 women named by Maxim magazine as Hottest Daughters of Rock Stars in 2009.

== Activism ==
Collins is an outspoken anti-bullying advocate and is a celebrity ambassador for the anti-bullying organisation Bystander Revolution.

In the 2024 United States presidential election, Collins endorsed Kamala Harris.

== Personal life ==
Collins stated in 2013 that she did not like to discuss her relationships publicly after witnessing the difficulties caused by the media coverage of her parents' divorce.

In September 2020, Collins announced her engagement to American film director and writer Charlie McDowell. They were married on 4 September 2021 at Dunton Hot Springs, Colorado. Collins purchased Case Study House No. 10 in Pasadena, California, in 2022. In March 2023, it was reported that they had bought a townhouse in the Østerbro district of Copenhagen, Denmark. In 2025, Collins announced on Instagram that their first child, a daughter, was born via surrogacy.

== Awards and nominations ==
Year	Association	Category	Work	Result	Ref.
2008	Young Hollywood Awards	One to Watch	—N/a	Won	
2012	Teen Choice Awards	Choice Movie Actress – Sci-Fi/Fantasy	Mirror Mirror	Nominated	
2013	MTV Movie Awards	Summer's Biggest Teen Bad A**	The Mortal Instruments: City of Bones	Nominated	
2014	Teen Choice Awards	Choice Movie Actress – Action	The Mortal Instruments: City of Bones	Nominated	
2016	Hollywood Film Awards	New Hollywood Awards	Rules Don't Apply	Won	
2016	Hollywood Music In Media Awards	Best Original Song – Feature Film (shared with Eddie Arkin and Lorraine Feather for "Rules Don't Apply")	Rules Don't Apply	Nominated	
2017	Golden Globe Awards	Best Actress in a Motion Picture – Comedy or Musical	Rules Don't Apply	Nominated	
2017	Alliance of Women Film Journalists	Most Egregious Age Difference Between the Leading Man and the Love Interest (shared with Warren Beatty)	Rules Don't Apply	Won	
2017	Costume Designers Guild	Lacoste Spotlight Award	Rules Don't Apply	Won	
2017	Ischia Global Film & Music Festival	Rising Star Award	To the Bone	Won	
2021	Primetime Emmy Award	Outstanding Comedy Series	Emily in Paris	Nominated	
2021	Golden Globe Awards	Best Actress – Television Series Musical or Comedy	Emily in Paris	Nominated	
2021	MTV Movie & TV Awards	Best Kiss (shared with Lucas Bravo)	Emily in Paris	Nominated	
2021	MTV Movie & TV Awards	Best Duo (shared with Ashley Park)	Emily in Paris	Nominated	

== Bibliography ==
Collins, Lily (March 7, 2017): Unfiltered: No Shame, No Regrets, Just Me. HarperCollins. ISBN 9780062473011
