= National Geographic Video =

Educational film and video series

Original release
- Network: National Geographic

National Geographic Video is an educational film and video series founded by the National Geographic Society in 1965. The series of videos includes the National Geographic Specials which have been broadcast on television for decades.

== List of Episodes ==
National Geographic Video
| Title | Original Release Date | Released as |
|---|---|---|
| Americans on Everest | 1965 | National Geographic Special |
| Miss Goodall and the Wild Chimpanzees | 1965 | National Geographic Special |
| Voyage of the Brigantine Yankee | 1966 | National Geographic Special |
| The World of Jacques-Yves Cousteau | 1966 | National Geographic Special |
| Dr. Leakey and the Dawn of Man | 1966 | National Geographic Special |
| The Hidden World: A Study of Insects | 1966 | National Geographic Special |
| Alaska! | 1967 | National Geographic Special |
| Yankee Sails Across Europe | 1967 | National Geographic Special |
| Grizzly! | 1967 | National Geographic Special |
| Winged World | 1967 | National Geographic Special |
| Amazon | 1968 | National Geographic Special |
| The Lonely Dorymen | 1968 | National Geographic Special |
| America's Wonderlands | 1968 | National Geographic Special |
| Reptiles and Amphibians | 1968 | National Geographic Special |
| Australia: The Timeless Land | 1969 | National Geographic Special |
| Polynesian Adventure | 1969 | National Geographic Special |
| The Mystery of Animal Behavior | 1969 | National Geographic Special |
| Siberia: The Endless Horizon | 1969 | National Geographic Special |
| Wild River | 1970 | National Geographic Special |
| Holland Against the Sea | 1970 | National Geographic Special |
| Zoos of the World | 1970 | National Geographic Special |
| Ethiopia: The Hidden Empire | 1970 | National Geographic Special |
| The Great Mojave Desert | 1971 | National Geographic Special |
| Journey to the High Arctic | 1971 | National Geographic Special |
| Monkeys, Apes, and Man | 1971 | National Geographic Special |
| The Last Tribes of Mindanao | 1972 | National Geographic Special |
| Man of the Serengeti | 1972 | National Geographic Special |
| The Last Vikings | 1972 | National Geographic Special |
| Strange Creatures of the Night | 1973 | National Geographic Special |
| The Violent Earth | 1973 | National Geographic Special |
| The Haunted West | 1973 | National Geographic Special |
| Wind Raiders of the Sahara | 1973 | National Geographic Special |
| Journey to the Outer Limits | 1974 | National Geographic Special |
| The Big Cats | 1974 | National Geographic Special |
| Bushmen of the Kalahari | 1974 | National Geographic Special |
| The Incredible Human Machine | 1975 | National Geographic Special |
| This Britain: Heritage of the Sea | 1975 | National Geographic Special |
| Search for the Great Apes | 1976 | National Geographic Special |
| The Animals Nobody Loved | 1976 | National Geographic Special |
| Treasure! | 1976 | National Geographic Special |
| Voyage of the Hokule'a | 1977 | National Geographic Special |
| The New Indians | 1977 | National Geographic Special |
| The Volga | 1977 | National Geographic Special |
| Yukon Passage | 1977 | National Geographic Special |
| The Legacy of L.S.B. Leakey | 1978 | National Geographic Special |
| The Great Whales | 1978 | National Geographic Special |
| The Living Sands of Namib | 1978 | National Geographic Special |
| Gold! | 1979 | National Geographic Special |
| Hong Kong: A Family Portrait | 1979 | National Geographic Special |
| Last Stand in Eden | 1979 | National Geographic Special |
| The Tigris Expedition | 1979 | |
| Dive to the Edge of Creation | 1980 | National Geographic Special |
| Mysteries of the Mind | 1980 | National Geographic Special |
| The Invisible World | 1980 | National Geographic Special |
| The Superliners: Twilight of an Era | 1980 | National Geographic Special |
| African Wildlife | 1980 | National Geographic Special |
| Etosha: Place of Dry Water | 1981 | National Geographic Special |
| Living Treasures of Japan | 1981 | National Geographic Special |
| National Parks: Playgrounds or Paradise | 1981 | National Geographic Special |
| Gorilla | 1981 | National Geographic Special |
| Survival of Forest | 1981 | National Geographic Special |
| Belize's Tropical Mountains | 1981 | National Geographic Special |
| The Sharks | 1982 | National Geographic Special |
| Egypt: Quest for Eternity | 1982 | National Geographic Special |
| Polar Bear Alert | 1982 | National Geographic Special |
| The Thames | 1982 | National Geographic Special |
| Botswana of the Wild | 1982 | National Geographic Special |
| Vietnam of Folklore | 1982 | National Geographic Special |
| Mystery of the Animals | 1982 | National Geographic Special |
| Rain Forest | 1983 | National Geographic Special |
| Australia's Animal Mysteries | 1983 | National Geographic Special |
| Save the Panda | 1983 | National Geographic Special |
| Born of Fire | 1983 | National Geographic Special |
| Kenyan Land | 1983 | National Geographic Special |
| Sudan's Hidden of Death | 1983 | National Geographic Special |
| Hats Around the World | 1983 | National Geographic Special |
| Among the Wild Chimpanzees | 1984 | National Geographic Special |
| Love Those Trains | 1984 | National Geographic Special |
| Return to Everest | 1984 | National Geographic Special |
| Flight of the Whooping Crane | 1984 | National Geographic Special |
| Iceland River Challenge | 1984 | Worldwide Pictures Ltd, Les Films de A'strophore |
| Bosnia from the Villages | 1984 | National Geographic Special |
| Legend of the Wolf | 1984 | National Geographic Special |
| Protecting Endangered Animals | 1984 | Educational Video Presentations |
| Land of the Tiger | 1985 | National Geographic Special |
| Four Americans in China | 1985 | National Geographic Special |
| Ballad of the Irish Horse | 1985 | National Geographic Special |
| Miraculous Machines | 1985 | National Geographic Special |
| Lesotho's Life of Villages | 1985 | National Geographic Special |
| Swamp Waters | 1985 | National Geographic Special |
| Miniature Miracle: Computer Chip | 1985 | |
| Secrets of the Titanic | 1986 | National Geographic Special |
| Chesapeake Borne | 1986 | National Geographic Special |
| Creatures of the Mangrove | 1986 | National Geographic Special |
| Jerusalem: Within These Walls | 1986 | National Geographic Special |
| Atocha: Quest for Treasure | 1986 | National Geographic Explorer Production |
| Realm of the Alligator | 1986 | National Geographic Special |
| Boat Challenge | 1986 | National Geographic Special |
| Bangladesh Quest for Explore | 1986 | National Geographic Special |
| Somalia's Hidden of Death | 1986 | National Geographic Special |
| The Secret Leopard | 1986 | Zebra Films |
| World's Last Great Places: Borneo Coast: Creatures of the Mangrove | 1986 | |
| Lions of the African Night | 1987 | National Geographic Special |
| In the Shadow of Vesuvius | 1987 | National Geographic Special |
| The Grizzlies | 1987 | National Geographic Special |
| Treasures from the Past | 1987 | National Geographic Special |
| Creatures of the Namib Desert | 1987 | National Geographic Special |
| Tropical Kingdom of Belize | 1987 | |
| Cambodia Place of Guide | 1987 | National Geographic Special |
| Ocean Reef | 1987 | National Geographic Special |
| Rocky Mountain Beaver Pond | 1987 | National Geographic Society |
| Man-Eaters of India | 1986 | |
| Himalayan River Run | 1987 | |
| African Odyssey | 1988 | National Geographic Special |
| Australia's Twilight of the Dreamtime | 1988 | National Geographic Special |
| The Rhino War | 1988 | National Geographic Special |
| Inside the Soviet Circus | 1988 | National Geographic Special |
| Mysteries of Mankind | 1988 | National Geographic Special |
| Australia's Aborigines | 1988 | National Geographic Special |
| The Explorers: A Century of Discovery | 1988 | National Geographic Special |
| Australia's Improbable Animals | 1988 | National Geographic Special |
| Africa's Stolen River | 1988 | |
| White Wolf | 1988 | |
| Tajikistan of Mountains | 1988 | National Geographic Special |
| Water Cycle | 1988 | National Geographic Special |
| Korean Guide | 1988 | National Geographic Special |
| The Wilds of Madagascar | 1988 | Partridge Films Production for the National Geographic Society |
| Muscular and Skeletal Systems | 1988 | Educational Video Presentations |
| Where Animals Live | 1988 | Educational Video Presentations |
| Animals A to Z | 1988 | Educational Video Presentations |
| Mammals and Their Young | 1988 | Educational Video Presentations |
| Cameramen Who Dared | 1989 | National Geographic Special |
| Baka: People of the Forest | 1989 | National Geographic Special |
| Elephant | 1989 | National Geographic Special |
| Those Wonderful Dogs | 1989 | National Geographic Special |
| Serengeti Diary | 1989 | National Geographic Special |
| Life of the Treasure | 1989 | National Geographic Special |
| Pakistan's Lost Kingdom | 1989 | National Geographic Special |
| Volcano! | 1989 | National Geographic Explorer Presentation |
| Physical Geography of North America: The Pacific Edge | 1989 | Educational Video Presentations |
| Physical Geography of North America: The Pacific Edge | 1989 | |
| In Search of Philippines | 1989 | National Geographic Special |
| Our National Parks: A Seasonal Tour | 1989 | National Geographic Book Service |
| Season of the Cheetah | 1989 | Partridge Films / Hugo Van Lawick / HTV |
| For All Mankind | 1989 | National Geographic Video Presentation |
| Wild Survivors: Camouflage & Mimicry | 1989 | |
| Reptiles and Amphibians | 1989 | National Geographic Special |
| Search for Battleship Bismarck | 1989 | National Geographic Production |
| Our National Parks: A Seasonal Tour | 1989 | National Geographic Book Service |
| Amazon: Land of the Flooded Forest | 1990 | National Geographic Special |
| Bali: Masterpiece of the Gods | 1990 | National Geographic Special |
| Journey to the Forgotten River | 1990 | National Geographic Special |
| Voices of Leningrad | 1990 | National Geographic Special |
| Antarctic Wildlife Adventure | 1990 | National Geographic Special |
| Jane Goodall: My Life with the Chimpanzees | 1990 | National Geographic Explorer Presentation |
| Exploring Our Solar System | 1990 | Educational Video Presentations |
| Seasons in the Sea | 1990 | National Geographic Video Presentation |
| Flight of the Eagle | 1990 | National Geographic Special |
| Uzbekistan's Ancient of Religion | 1990 | National Geographic Special |
| Crocodiles: Here Be Dragons | 1990 | National Geographic Explorer Presentation |
| Arabia: Sand, Sea & Sky | 1990 | National Geographic Video Presentation |
| Discover Russia | 1990 | National Geographic Book Service |
| Cats: Caressing the Tiger | 1991 | National Geographic Special |
| Great Lakes: Fragile Seas | 1991 | National Geographic Special |
| Splendid Stones | 1991 | National Geographic Special |
| The Soul of Spain | 1991 | National Geographic Special |
| Hawaii: Strangers in Paradise | 1991 | National Geographic Special |
| The Urban Gorilla | 1991 | National Geographic Explorer Presentation |
| Zebra: Patterns in the Grass | 1991 | National Geographic Explorer Presentation |
| Angola Wildlife | 1991 | |
| Penguins of Ice | 1991 | |
| Bhutan of the Valley | 1991 | |
| Shark Encounters | 1991 | National Geographic Explorer Presentation |
| Nature's Fury! | 1991 | |
| Great Moments With National Geographic | 1991 | National Geographic Special |
| Eternal Enemies: Lions and Hyenas | 1992 | National Geographic Special |
| The Mexicans: Through Their Eyes | 1992 | National Geographic Special |
| Braving Alaska | 1992 | National Geographic Special |
| Mysteries Underground | 1992 | National Geographic Special |
| Kangaroo Comeback | 1992 | National Geographic Special |
| I Can Take Care of Myself | 1992 | Educational Video Presentations |
| Africa's Animal Oasis | 1992 | National Geographic Explorer Presentation |
| Valley of the Kangaroos | 1992 | National Geographic Explorer Presentation |
| Webs of Intrigue | 1992 | National Geographic Explorer |
| Lost Kingdoms of the Maya | 1993 | National Geographic Special |
| Keepers of the Wild | 1993 | National Geographic Special |
| Survivors of the Skeleton Coast | 1993 | National Geographic Special |
| The Power of Water | 1993 | National Geographic Special |
| Killer Whales: Wolves of the Sea | 1993 | National Geographic Explorer Presentation |
| The Simple Machine | 1993 | Educational Video Presentations |
| The Lost Fleet of Guadalcanal | 1993 | National Geographic Explorer Presentation |
| Quest for Treasure | 1993 | National Geographic Explorer Production |
| Ocean Drifters | 1993 | National Geographic Explorer Presentation |
| Australia's Great Barrier Reef | 1993 | National Geographic Video |
| Lions of Darkness | 1993 | National Geographic Explorer Presentation |
| Giant Bears of Kodiak Island | 1994 | National Geographic Special |
| Reflections on Elephants | 1994 | National Geographic Special |
| Jewels of the Caribbean Sea | 1994 | National Geographic Special |
| Last Voyage of the Lusitania | 1994 | |
| Geo Kids: Cool Cats, Raindrops, and Things That Live in Holes | 1994 | National Geographic Kids Video; Columbia TriStar Home Video |
| Geo Kids: Flying, Trying, and Honking Around | 1994 | |
| China: Beyond the Clouds (Part One) | 1994 | National Geographic Special |
| China: Beyond the Clouds (Part Two) | 1994 | National Geographic Special |
| Wings Over the Serengeti | 1994 | National Geographic Explorer Presentation |
| Hunt for the Great White Shark | 1994 | National Geographic Explorer Presentation |
| Geo Kids: Bear Cubs, Baby Ducks, and Kooky Kookaburras | 1994 | National Geographic Kids Video |
| 30 Years of National Geographic Specials | 1995 | National Geographic Special |
| Great White Shark | 1995 | National Geographic Special |
| Secrets of the Wild Panda | 1995 | National Geographic Special |
| The Great Indian Railway | 1995 | National Geographic Special |
| Cyclone! | 1995 | National Geographic Special |
| The New Chimpanzees | 1995 | National Geographic Special |
| The Photographers | 1995 | |
| Geo Kids: Camouflage, Cuttlefish, and Chameleons Changing Color | 1995 | |
| Geo Kids: Chomping on Bugs, Swimming Sea Slugs, and Stuff That Makes Animals Special | 1995 | National Geographic Kids Video |
| Geo Kids: Tadpoles, Dragonflies, and the Caterpillar's Big Change | 1995 | Educational Video Presentations |
| Yellowstone: Realm of the Coyote | 1995 | National Geographic Explorer Presentation |
| The Greatest Flight | 1995 | National Geographic Explorer |
| Wildlife Warriors | 1996 | National Geographic Special |
| Last Feast of the Crocodiles | 1996 | National Geographic Special |
| Russia's Last Tsar | 1996 | National Geographic Special |
| Beauty and the Beasts: A Leopard's Story | 1996 | National Geographic Special |
| Arctic Kingdom: Life at the Edge | 1996 | National Geographic Special |
| Last Voyage of the Andrea Doria | 1996 | National Geographic Special |
| World's Last Great Places: Okavango: Africa's Wild Oasis | 1996 | National Geographic Special |
| Puma: Lion of the Andes | 1996 | National Geographic Special |
| Dinosaur Hunters | 1996 | National Geographic Special |
| Star-Spangled Banner: Our Nation's Flag | 1996 | Educational Video Presentations |
| African Safari | 1996 | National Geographic Special |
| Inside the White House | 1996 | National Geographic Television |
| World's Last Great Places: Hidden Congo: The Forest Primeval | 1996 | National Geographic Television Production |
| World's Last Great Places: Panama Wild: Rain Forest of Life | 1996 | National Geographic Explorer Presentation |
| World's Last Great Places: Virunga: The Heart of Africa | 1996 | National Geographic Television Production |
| Asteroids: Deadly Impact | 1997 | National Geographic Special |
| Tigers of the Snow | 1997 | National Geographic Special |
| Volcano: Nature's Inferno | 1997 | National Geographic Special |
| World's Last Great Places: Sonoran Desert: A Violent Eden | 1997 | National Geographic Special |
| Spitting Mad: Wild Camel of the Andes | 1997 | National Geographic Special |
| Foxes of the Kalahari | 1997 | National Geographic Special |
| King Cobra | 1997 | National Geographic Explorer Presentation |
| The Savage Garden | 1997 | National Geographic Explorer Presentation |
| Killer Wave: Power of the Tsunami | 1997 | National Geographic Explorer Presentation |
| Animal Holiday | 1997 | National Geographic Kids Video |
| Animal Classes: Birds | 1997 | Educational Video Presentations |
| Animal Classes: Fish | 1997 | Educational Video Presentations |
| Animal Classes: Insects | 1997 | Educational Video Presentations |
| World's Last Great Places: Everglades: Secrets of the Swamp | 1997 | |
| America's Endangered Species: Don't Say Good-Bye | 1998 | National Geographic Special |
| Sea Monsters: Search for the Giant Squid | 1998 | National Geographic Special |
| Treasures of the Deep | 1998 | National Geographic Special |
| Dragons of the Galapagos | 1998 | National Geographic Special |
| Storm of the Century | 1998 | National Geographic Special |
| Egypt: Secrets of the Pharaohs | 1998 | National Geographic Special |
| Ancient Graves: Voices of the Dead | 1998 | National Geographic Special |
| The Filmmakers | 1998 | National Geographic Explorer Presentation |
| The Secret Life of Cats | 1998 | National Geographic Video |
| The Battle for Midway | 1998 | National Geographic Television |
| Mysteries of Egypt | 1998 | National Geographic Television |
| Untold Stories of WWII | 1998 | |
| Rain Forest: Heroes of the High Frontier | 1999 | National Geographic Special |
| Dolphins: The Wild Side | 1999 | National Geographic Special |
| Hidden World of the Bengal Tiger | 1999 | National Geographic Special |
| Avalanche: The White Death | 1999 | National Geographic Special |
| Tempest from the Deep | 1999 | National Geographic Special |
| Adventures In Time: The National Geographic Millennium Special | 1999 | National Geographic Special |
| Lost Ships of the Mediterranean | 1999 | National Geographic Special |
| The Noble Horse | 1999 | National Geographic Television & Thirteen/WNET |
| The Great White Bear | 1999 | National Geographic Explorer Presentation |
| Hindenburg's Fiery Secret | 1999 | National Geographic Explorer Presentation |
| A Cheetah Story | 1999 | |
| I Love Dinosaurs | 2000 | National Geographic Explorer |
| The Swarm: India's Killer Bees | 2000 | National Geographic Explorer Presentation |
| Wolves: A Legend Returns to Yellowstone | 2000 | |
| Dinosaur Giants: Found! | 2000 | National Geographic Explorer Presentation |
| Across the Atlantic: Behind the Lindbergh Legend | 2000 | CineNova Production for National Geographic Television |
| Australia's Kangaroos | 2000 | National Geographic Television with Partridge Films |
| Great White Shark: Truth Behind the Legend | 2000 | National Geographic Explorer Presentation |
| Destination Space (Bonus Program: A View of Mars) | 2000 | National Geographic Special |
| Inside the Vatican | 2001 | National Geographic Television |
| Pearl Harbor: Legacy of Attack | 2001 | National Geographic Special |
| Beyond the Movie: Pearl Harbor | 2001 | Beyond the Movie |
| Air Force One | 2001 | Partisan Pictures Inc. Production |
| The United Snakes of America | 2001 | National Geographic Explorer Presentation |
| America's Lost Mustangs | 2001 | National Geographic Special |
| Ambassador: Inside the Embassy | 2002 | National Geographic Special |
| Inca Mummies: Secrets of a Lost World | 2002 | National Geographic Television |
| Lewis & Clark: Great Journey West | 2002 | National Geographic Television & Film |
| Egypt Eternal: The Quest for Lost Tombs | 2002 | |
| Inside Mecca | 2003 | National Geographic Special |
| Surviving Everest | 2003 | National Geographic Special |
| Through the Lens | 2003 | National Geographic Television & Film |
| In Search of the Jaguar | 2003 | |
| Dawn of the Maya | 2004 | National Geographic Special |
| Forces of Nature | 2004 | National Geographic Special |
| Quest for the Phoenicians | 2004 | National Geographic Special |
| Arlington: Field of Honor | 2005 | |
| Inside Grand Central | 2005 | |
| Last Stand of the Great Bear | 2006 | |
| San Francisco's Great Quake | 2006 | |
| Lost Treasures of Afghanistan | 2006 | |
| The Great Inca Rebellion | 2007 | National Geographic Special |
| Bear Island | 2007 | |
| Eden at the End of the World | 2008 | National Geographic Special |
| The President's Photographer | 2010 | |
| The Twins Who Share a Brain | 2010 | |
| America's Greatest Animals | 2012 | |
| Nervous System | | Educational Video Presentations |
| Animals that Live in the City | | Educational Video Presentations |
| Animal Guessing Games | | Educational Video Presentations |
| Animals in All Kings of Weather | | Educational Video Presentations |
| How Animals Move | | Educational Video Presentations |
| Dolphins of Sea | | |
| Inside of Greece | | |
| Backyard Bugs | | Educational Video Presentations |
| Mapping Your World | | Educational Video Presentations |
| Kingdom of Plants: What Is a Seed? | | Educational Video Presentations |
| Kingdom of Plants: What Is a Flower? | | Educational Video Presentations |
| At Home With Zoo Animals | | Educational Video Presentations |
| Animals on the Farm | | Educational Video Presentations |
| Sizing up Animals | | Educational Video Presentations |
| Senses: How We Know | | Educational Video Presentations |
| Five Themes For Planet Earth | | Educational Video Presentations |
| Discovering the Cell | | Educational Video Presentations |
| Where Does it Come From? | | Educational Video Presentations |
| I Can Help, Too | | Educational Video Presentations |
| Atmosphere: On the Air | | Educational Video Presentations |
| Playing Fair | | Educational Video Presentations |
| Life In the Sea: Web of Life | | Educational Video Presentations |
| Grand Canyon: The Courageous First Explorers | | |
| The Great Cover-Up: Animal Camouflage | | Educational Video Presentations |
| Coral Reef | | Educational Video Presentations |
| Look at Zoos | | Educational Video Presentations |
| Mammals | | Educational Video Presentations |
| Photosynthesis: Life Energy | | Educational Video Presentations |
| Portrait of a Whale | | Educational Video Presentations |
| Hats, Clothes and Shoes | | Educational Video Presentations |
| Reflecting on the Moon | | Educational Video Presentations |
| Solid, Liquid, Gas | | Educational Video Presentations |
| Tadpoles and Frogs | | Educational Video Presentations |
| The Four Seasons Series: Spring | | Educational Video Presentations |
| The Four Seasons Series: Summer | | Educational Video Presentations |
| The Four Seasons Series: Autumn | | Educational Video Presentations |
| The Four Seasons Series: Winter | | Educational Video Presentations |
| A Tidal Flat and Its Ecosystem | | Educational Video Presentations |
| What Energy Means | | Educational Video Presentations |
