= Extremely Wicked, Shockingly Evil and Vile =

2019 film by Joe Berlinger

- Release poster
- Directed by: Joe Berlinger
- Screenplay by: Michael Werwie
- Based on: The Phantom Prince: My Life with Ted Bundy by Elizabeth Kendall
- Produced by: Michael Costigan; Nicolas Chartier; Joe Berlinger; Ara Keshishian; Michael Simkin
- Starring: Zac Efron; Lily Collins; Kaya Scodelario; Haley Joel Osment; Jim Parsons; John Malkovich; James Hetfield
- Cinematography: Brandon Trost
- Edited by: Josh Schaeffer
- Music by: Marco Beltrami; Dennis Smith
- Production companies: COTA Films; Voltage Pictures; Third Eye Motion Picture Company
- Distributed by: Netflix
- Release dates: January 26, 2019 (Sundance); May 3, 2019 (United States)
- Running time: 108 minutes
- Country: United States
- Language: English
- Box office: $9.8 million

Extremely Wicked, Shockingly Evil and Vile is a 2019 American crime drama film about the life of serial killer Ted Bundy. Directed by Joe Berlinger with a screenplay from Michael Werwie, the film is based on Bundy's former girlfriend Elizabeth Kendall's memoir, The Phantom Prince: My Life with Ted Bundy. The film stars Zac Efron as Bundy, Lily Collins as Kendall, Kaya Scodelario as Bundy's wife Carole Ann Boone, and John Malkovich as Edward Cowart, the presiding judge at Bundy's trial. The title of the film is a reference to Cowart's remarks on Bundy's murders while sentencing him to death.

Extremely Wicked, Shockingly Evil and Vile had its world premiere at the Sundance Film Festival on January 26, 2019, and was released in the United States on May 3, 2019, by Netflix. The film received mixed reviews from critics, though Efron and Collins's performances were praised.

== Plot ==
In 1969 Seattle, law student Ted Bundy meets Liz Kendall, a young secretary and divorced mother. The two begin dating, and Ted helps Liz raise her young daughter, Molly.

By 1974, news reports announce the recent murders of multiple young women, including two who disappeared in broad daylight at Lake Sammamish; a man resembling Ted was seen by several people asking women to help him load a kayak onto a Volkswagen Beetle. A composite sketch of the attacker is released and, following hundreds of phone calls, Ted is arrested the following year.

A young woman named Carol DaRonch picks Ted out of a police lineup, claiming he had kidnapped and threatened to kill her before she managed to escape. Ted is released on bail, returning home to Liz who is upset after reading an article about him in the newspaper. Ted explains that Carol was shown his picture before the lineup took place, which is why he looked familiar to her, and says he believes he is being set up. After a four-day bench trial, Ted is found guilty of aggravated kidnapping and is sentenced to serve a minimum of one to a maximum of 15 years in the Utah State Prison.

A few weeks later, Colorado authorities charge Ted with the murder of Caryn Campbell, and he is transferred to Aspen, Colorado, in 1977. Liz refuses to believe Ted is guilty, but the events start to take a toll on her, and she begins drinking heavily as a result. While at Pitkin County Courthouse, Ted elects to serve as his own attorney and, as such, is excused from wearing handcuffs or leg shackles. During a court recess, Ted escapes from the courthouse by jumping out of a second-story window and running to the mountains through the town, but is recaptured after six days.

Liz visits Ted and ends their relationship. He later escapes again after sawing a square into his cell's ceiling. Two women at a sorority house are murdered at Florida State University, followed by vicious attacks on three more. After Ted is arrested, he tries to contact Liz, but she hangs up on him. He starts to receive a following of women who are fascinated by him, some even claiming they love him. Ted is also visited by an old friend, Carole Ann Boone, who believes he is innocent and moves to Florida to be closer to him during his upcoming murder trial.

A pre-trial plea bargain is negotiated in which Ted would plead guilty to killing the two sorority girls, Lisa Levy and Margaret Bowman, and twelve-year-old Kimberly Leach, in exchange for a 75-year prison sentence instead of a possible death sentence, but he refuses. Ted and Carole Ann grow closer as she visits him regularly; the two begin a relationship, but Ted continues to reach out to Liz who is following his trials via television. She carries the guilt of being the person who gave Ted's name to the Seattle authorities in 1975. Ted later proposes to Carole Ann mid-trial and they marry.

Incriminating physical evidence is provided in court, including a match of a plaster cast of Ted's teeth to the impressions of bite wounds left on Levy's buttocks. In under seven hours, the jury convicts Ted of the murders of Levy and Bowman, three counts of attempted first-degree murder, and two counts of burglary. Trial judge Edward Cowart imposes death sentences for the murders.

Ten years later, Liz receives a letter from Ted and visits him, taking a photograph given to her by a detective. She demands the truth but Ted continues to deny having anything to do with the murders and proclaims his innocence. She then shows Ted a photograph, a crime scene image of one of his decapitated victims, and he finally admits that he sawed her head off by writing the word "hacksaw" in the condensation on the visiting room window that separates them. Liz leaves the prison in shock but is met outside by her new husband Jerry, and Molly, now a teenager, and she proclaims that she is finally okay.

As the film ends, archival footage and on-screen text say that Ted was executed on January 24, 1989 at 42 years old. Ted had confessed to over 30 murders days before his execution, and asked that his ashes be scattered in the Cascade Mountains, where he had deposited the remains of numerous victims.

== Cast ==
- Zac Efron as Ted Bundy, a former law student who murdered dozens of women.
- Lily Collins as Liz Kendall, a college secretary and single mother who enters a relationship with Ted and believes his claims of innocence through his trials.
- Kaya Scodelario as Carole Ann Boone, an old friend of Ted's who moves closer to him for support. They later marry in court.
- Jeffrey Donovan as John O'Connell, Ted's attorney in Utah who defends his kidnapping case.
- Angela Sarafyan as Joanna, Liz's close friend who believes Ted is guilty.
- Dylan Baker as David Yocom, the prosecuting attorney in Utah.
- Brian Geraghty as Dan Dowd, Ted's public defender in Florida when he is re-captured after escaping in Colorado.
- Terry Kinney as Mike Fisher, a homicide detective who ties Ted to a murder in Colorado.
- Haley Joel Osment as Jerry Thompson, Liz's co-worker at the University Medical Division whom she begins dating after Ted and eventually marries.
- James Hetfield as Bob Hayward, a police officer in Utah who first arrests Bundy. "The Four Horsemen", a song co-written by Hetfield for the Metallica album Kill 'Em All, is also featured in the film.
- Grace Victoria Cox as Carol DaRonch, a woman Ted kidnapped in Utah, leading to his first conviction.
- Jim Parsons as Larry Simpson, the prosecuting attorney in Florida.
- John Malkovich as Edward Cowart, the presiding judge at Ted's final murder trial.
- Justin McCombs as Jim Dumas, Ted's attorney in Colorado who defends his first murder case.
- Forba Shepherd as Louise Bundy, Ted's mother.

Molly Kendall, Liz's daughter, is portrayed at different ages by Macie Carmosino, Ava Inman, Morgan Pyle, and Grace Balbo. Director Joe Berlinger and cinematographer Brandon Trost make cameo appearances as the presenter and cameraman who interview Ted in Colorado.

== Production ==
The project was unveiled at the 2017 Cannes Film Festival, with Zac Efron set to star as the serial killer Ted Bundy, and documentary filmmaker Joe Berlinger signed to direct. In October 2017, Lily Collins was cast as Bundy's girlfriend Elizabeth Kendall.

In January 2018, John Malkovich was cast to play Edward Cowart, the judge presiding over Bundy's case. Principal production began on January 18, 2018, in Covington, Kentucky. Angela Sarafyan, Jeffrey Donovan, Grace Victoria Cox, Kaya Scodelario, Jim Parsons, Haley Joel Osment, Dylan Baker and Terry Kinney joined the film throughout the rest of January, with Metallica guitarist and lead singer James Hetfield being added in February.

== Release ==
The film had its world premiere at the Sundance Film Festival on January 26, 2019. Shortly after, Netflix acquired the domestic distribution rights to the film for $9 million. It was digitally released on the platform on May 3, 2019, along with a limited theatrical release.

The film was theatrically released in several overseas markets, grossing a total of $9.8 million, with its largest markets being Mexico ($5.6 million) and Italy ($1.1 million).

== Critical response ==
On review aggregator Rotten Tomatoes, the film holds an approval rating of 54% based on 182 reviews, and an average rating of 5.7/10. The website's critical consensus reads, "Extremely Wicked, Shockingly Evil and Vile often transcends its narrative limitations through sheer force of Zac Efron's compulsively watchable performance." On Metacritic, the film has a weighted average score of 52 out of 100, based on 31 critics, indicating "mixed or average" reviews.

Owen Gleiberman of Variety praised Efron's performance for his accuracy in portraying Bundy, and wrote: "Extremely Wicked doesn't rub our noses in the horror of Ted Bundy. It shows us just enough, keeping the horror where it belongs, in the recesses of our imagination, where it remains what it should be: dark as midnight, and altogether too much to fathom." The Guardian's Benjamin Lee gave the film three out of five stars, also praising Efron but calling the film itself a "pedestrian and graceless drama". He criticized Collins's performance, saying she was reduced to a stock character. Writing for Vulture, Emily Yoshida had a similar perspective, praising Efron but disliking the rest of the film, and saying, "The narrative feature from veteran documentarian Joe Berlinger seems as though it's setting out to be the story of serial killer Ted Bundy told through the eyes of his girlfriend ... But Berlinger's film gets sucked into the gravity of sensational events that are already a matter of public record, and spends so much time meticulously recreating them that the perspective is diluted."

Sonia Rao of The Washington Post wrote that the film failed to distance itself from the glorification of Bundy and did not address the impact of his crimes on his victims' loved ones.
