= Sharon Duce =

English actress (born 1948)

- Born: 17 January 1948 (age 78); Sheffield, England
- Occupation: Actress
- Years active: 1970–present
- Children: 2

Sharon D. Duce (born 17 January 1948) is an English actress.

== Career ==
Born in Sheffield, she trained at the Webber Douglas Academy of Dramatic Art then became a stage actress at the Sheffield Repertory Theatre, the York Theatre Royal, and the Theatre in the Round, before joining Ian McKellen and Edward Petherbridge's Actors Company. Apart from her career in film and television, she has had leading roles at the Royal Court Theatre and other West End theatres.

Duce began her acting career in 1970; She made her first appearance on the short-lived ITV crime drama series Parkin's Patch, before going on to many television guest appearances throughout the decade, in shows including Armchair Theatre, Z-Cars, Play for Today and Crown Court, as well as film roles in The Tamarind Seed, which was her film debut, and Absolution. Her television guest roles continued into the 1980s in a number of mainstream productions, such as The Professionals, Minder, Tales of the Unexpected, In Loving Memory, Rockliffe, and Doctor Who. She had a main role in the short-lived ITV comedy series Funny Man, and in the BBC One series Big Deal, as Jan Oliver.

Duce was cast in the 1991 film Buddy's Song, based on the 1987 novel of the same name; she plays Carol Clark, the mother of Buddy (Chesney Hawkes), who attempts to make it as a musician with the help of Buddy's father and her estranged husband (Roger Daltrey). In 1992, she guest-appeared in the fourth series drama series of CITV drama Press Gang, followed by the leading role of Pat Hollingsworth in BBC One's Growing Pains. She appeared in The Tomorrow People, the revived version of the 1970s series, Wycliffe and Peak Practice.

In the 2000s, she has had guest roles in Playing the Field, Where the Heart Is and The Royle Family, in which she made an appearance in the third series' Christmas special. She had a recurring role in London's Burning, and appearances in soap operas Emmerdale, as Millicent Rudge in 2003, and in Coronation Street as Julie Carp's mother, Paula Carp, she departed the soap on 22 May 2009.

She also had multiple guest roles in long running drama series Casualty, The Bill and Doctors.

== Personal life ==
She has two children with the former actor Dominic Guard, with whom she appeared in the 1978 film Absolution.

== Filmography ==
Film
Year	Title	Role	Notes
1974	The Tamarind Seed	Sandy Mitchell	
1978	Absolution	Louella	
1981	Outland	Prostitute	
1989	Blackwater Summer	Wife	Short
1990	Shooting Stars	Paula	
1991	Buddy's Song	Carol	
1994	Super Grass	Mum	
1999	Rogue Trader	Patsy Sims	
2000	Secret Society	Janice	
2008	Six and Seven	(unknown role)	Video short
2024	Look to the Light	Nan	
TBA	Signs of Life	Joyce	

Television
Year	Title	Role	Notes
1970	Parkin's Patch	Bobby Tupper	Series 1, episode 17
1971	Armchair Theatre	Veronica	Series 13, episode 7
1971	Thirty-Minute Theatre	Mirabelle	Series 7, episode 5
1971	ITV Playhouse	Sheila	Series 5, episode 3
1971	Z-Cars	WPC Cameron	Series 7, episodes 30, 31 & 51
1972	Softly, Softly: Task Force	Mrs. Nicholson	Series 3, episode 21
1972	Scene	Girl	Series 4, episode 12
1972	Mistress of Hardwick	Lady	Series 1, episode 7
1972	Crime of Passion	Yvette	Series 3, episode 4
1972	Thirty-Minute Theatre	Rosemary	Series 7, episode 33
1972	New Scotland Yard	Tricia	Series 1, episode 12
1972	Villains	Alice	Series 1, episode 5
1973	Full House	Erm in George Reborn	Series 1, episode 12
1973	Away from It All	Beth	Series 1, episode 6
1973	Helen: A Woman of Today	Carole	Series 1 (7 episodes)
1975	2nd House	Actress in Knots	Series 2, episode 10
1975	Z-Cars	Yvonne James	Series 10, episode 23
1975	Dawson's Weekly	Sandra Evans	Series 1, episode 6
1975	The Wild West Show	Sheila	Series 1, episodes 1 & 4
1976	Centre Play	Freda Hayes	Series 3, episode 10
1976	Bill Brand	Sian	Series 1, episode 11
1976	Play for Today	Joyce	Series 7, episode 5
1976	Crown Court	Sylvia Turner	Series 5, episodes 60, 61 & 62
1977	The House That Jack Built	Lu	Miniseries (6 episodes)
1977	The Foundation	Mrs. Sherwood	Series 1, episode 4
1977	BBC2 Play of the Week	Ada	Series 1, episode 3
1978	Crown Court	Anne Charlton	Series 7, episodes 34, 35 & 36
1978	Send in the Girls	Diane	Series 1, episode 7
1978	A Woman's Place?	Leila	Series 1, episode 1
1978	BBC2 Play of the Week	Aline Charigist	Series 2, episode 11
1980–81	Coming Home	Sheila Maddocks	Pilot & Series 1 (6 episodes)
1980	The Professionals	Annie	Series 4, episode 6
1980	Minder	Beryl Sharp	Series 2, episode 6
1980	Premiere	Mrs. Hammond	Series 4, episode 2
1981	BBC2 Playhouse	Bridget	Series 7, episode 14
1981	Funny Man	Kath Gibson	Series 1 (11 episodes)
1981	Take the Stage	Herself	Series 1, episode 6
1982	Tales of the Unexpected	Sophie Trent	Series 5, episode 1
1981	In Loving Memory	Hermione Hepworth	Series 3, episode 6
1983	The Hard Word	Vicky Clough	Series 1 (6 episodes)
1983	The Bounder	Doreen	Series 2, episode 1
1984	Weekend Playhouse	Susan	Series 1, episode 7
1984–86	Big Deal	Jan Oliver	Series 1–3 (30 episodes)
1987	Running Wild	Wanda	Series 1, episode 6
1988	Casualty	Thea	Series 3, episode 9
1988	First Born	Emily Jessop	Miniseries (episode 2)
1988	Rockliffe	Judy Maidment	Series 3: Rockliffe's Folly, episodes 1 & 2
1988	Boon	Anita Wilberforce	Series 3, episode 4
1989	Singles	Stephanie	Series 2, episode 3
1989	Doctor Who	Control	Serial: "Ghost Light"
1991	The Bill	Mrs. Cook	Series 7, episode 21
1991	The Play on One	Joan Glenn	Series 4, episode 1
1992	Press Gang	Katherine Hill	Series 4, episodes 5 & 6
1992–93	Growing Pains	Pat Hollingsworth	Series 1–2 (20 episodes)
1992	Natural Lies	Maggie Fell	Series 1, episodes 1, 2 & 3
1994	99-1	Ronnie	Series 1, episode 3
1995	The Tomorrow People	Penny Weston	Serial: "The Living Stones"
1995	Trafford Tanzi	Tanzi's Mum	TV movie short
1996	Casualty	Isabel McEnery	Series 10, episode 19
1996	Into the Fire	Anita	Miniseries (3 episodes)
1996	Shakespeare's Shorts	Maria	Series 1, episode 4
1996	Short Sharp Shocks	Mother	Series 1, episode 3
1997	Wycliffe	Supt. Le Page	Series 4, episodes 2, 3 & 5
1997	Peak Practice	Carol-Anne Kern	Series 5, episode 14
1998	The Bill	Cathy Cross	Series 14, episode 77
1998	Maisie Raine	Eileen Slayburn	Series 1, episode 6
2000	Holby City	Jill O'Hanlon	Series 2, episode 16
2000	Playing the Field	Sheila Hurst	Series 3, episode 5 & Series 4, episode 4
2000	Where the Heart Is	Shelley Wilson	Series 4, episodes 11 & 12
2000	The Royle Family	Valerie Kavanagh	Series 3, episode 7 (Christmas special)
2001–02	London's Burning	Elaine Reeve	Series 13–14 (18 episodes)
2001	Merseybeat	Holly Ormerod	Series 1, episode 9
2001	Doctors	Rachel Wilson	Series 3 (5 episodes)
2002	Clocking Off	Vicky Sullivan	Series 3, episodes 4, 6 & 8
2003	Grease Monkeys	Bernie	Series 1, episode 5
2003	Emmerdale	Millicent Rudge	5 episodes
2004	Casualty	Alesia Pamboris	Series 18, episode 22
2004	Conviction	Sandra Buliegh	Miniseries (5 episodes)
2005	Dalziel and Pascoe	Jenny Challoner	Series 9, episodes 3 & 4
2006	The Royal	Norma Smithson	Series 5, episode 3
2006	Sorted	Helena	Series 1, episode 6
2008	Casualty	Sheila Denham	Series 22–23 (3 episodes)
2008	HolbyBlue	Linda Jackson	Series 2, episode 7
2008	The Bill	Doreen Hutton	Series 24, episode 40
2008	Missing	Mrs. Susan Greenside	Miniseries (2 episodes)
2009	Moving On	Sue Morgan	Series 1, episode 3
2009	Coronation Street	Paula Carp	16 episodes
2010	A Passionate Woman	Christine	Miniseries (episode 2)
2012	Midsomer Murders	Mandy Gideon	Series 15, episode 2
2015	Doctors	Celia Armstrong	Series 16, episode 171
2015	Black Work	Barbara	Miniseries (3 episodes)
2016	Vera	Marcia	Series 6, episode 1
2016	Casualty	Meg Stuart	Series 30, episodes 26 & 27
2019	Doctors	Sandra Blackwell	Series 20, episode 55

Podcast series
Year	Title	Role	Notes
2022	Cupid	Hera, Fury 2	
