= Marti Noxon =

Screenwriter, television writer, television producer

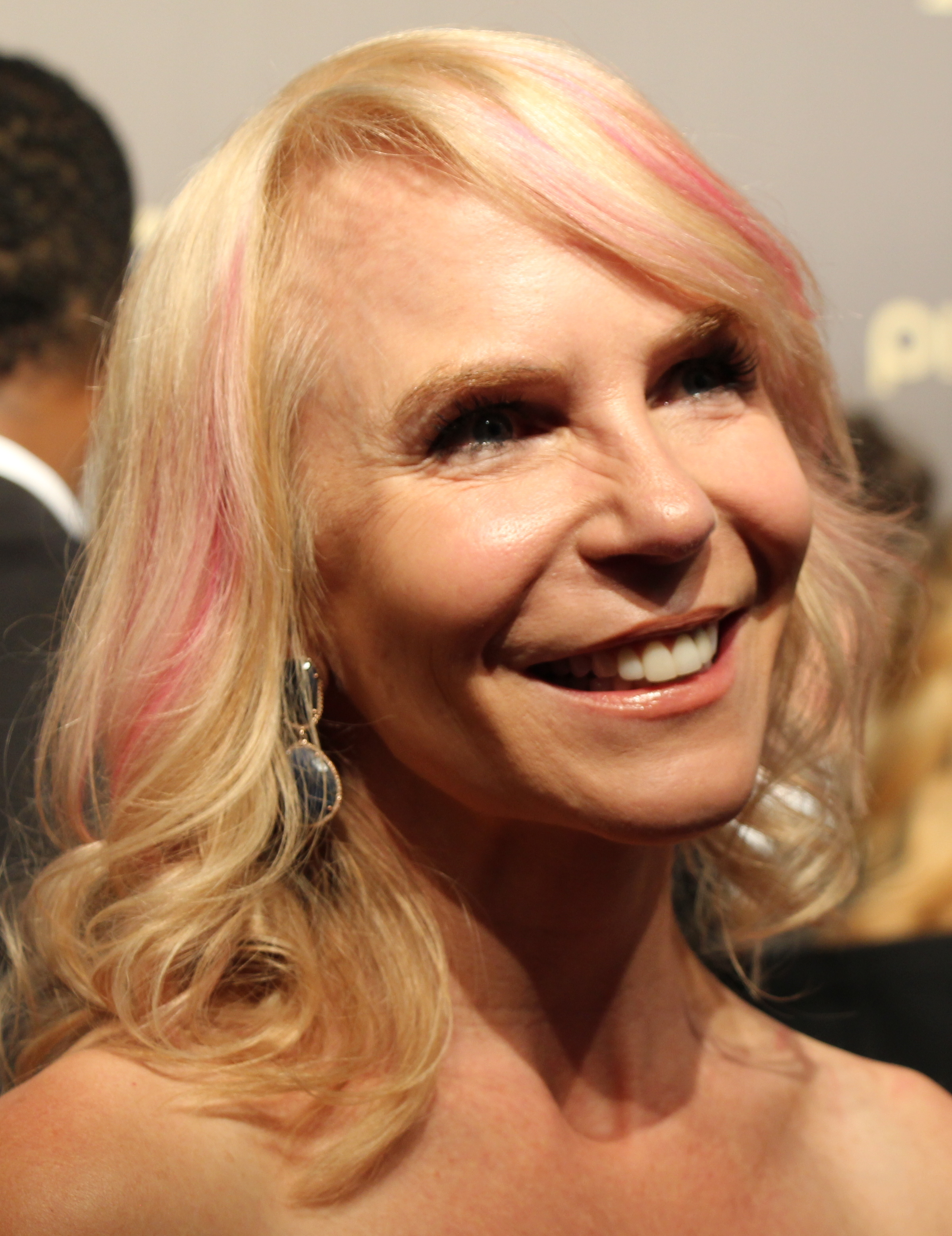
- Noxon in May 2016
- Born: Martha Mills Noxon; August 25, 1964 (age 62); Los Angeles, California, U.S.
- Education: University of California, Santa Cruz
- Occupations: Screenwriter, television writer, television producer
- Years active: 1998–present
- Known for: Buffy the Vampire Slayer; Girlfriends' Guide to Divorce; UnREAL
- Spouse: Jeff Bynum (m. 2000, divorced)
- Children: 2
- Parent: Nicolas Noxon
- Relatives: Christopher Noxon (brother); Jenji Kohan (sister-in-law)

Martha Mills Noxon (born August 25, 1964) is an American television and film writer, director, and producer. She is best known for her work as a screenwriter and executive producer on the supernatural drama series Buffy the Vampire Slayer (1997–2003). She was also executive producer, writer, and creator of the Bravo comedy-drama series Girlfriends' Guide to Divorce (2014–18) and the Lifetime drama series UnREAL (2015–18), and an executive producer of the CBS medical drama series Code Black (2015–17).

Noxon also wrote the science fiction action film I Am Number Four (2011), the horror thriller film Fright Night (2011), and the biographical drama film The Glass Castle (2017). She wrote and directed the drama film To the Bone (2017).

Noxon created the AMC dark comedy series Dietland and the HBO limited series Sharp Objects, both of which premiered in 2018.

== Early life ==
Noxon was born in Los Angeles, California, to National Geographic documentary filmmaker father, Nicolas Noxon, and Mary Straley. Noxon has said that she grew up in nearby Santa Monica, and that her mother was gay. She has a brother, Christopher Noxon, who is a writer and was previously married to TV writer Jenji Kohan. Her grandmother was painter Betty Lane. Noxon would often accompany her father when he traveled to shoot documentary films and was already in love with the idea of movies.

Noxon graduated from Oakes College at the University of California, Santa Cruz in 1987 with a B.A. in Theater Arts.

== Career ==
=== Early career ===
Initially Noxon wanted to be an actor because it seemed glamorous, but after trying for a while realized it was not something that she wanted to do. She said that she had always been told that writing was her strength, and eventually that was what she focused on.

She met producer Rick Rosenthal while working as a waitress and eventually became his assistant. She then became TV writer Barbara Hall's assistant. Noxon said that Hall was a strong mentor in what is an informal mentorship that writers sometimes find. Noxon had written a senior thesis project that was required for her major in college, then forgot about it for four years. She reconnected with the material and showed it to a producer, who tried to get it made. She counts this as the beginning of her writing career. She then sold something early on (which was never made). Following this, she spent seven years writing on her own, developing her abilities as a writer, before she got onto Buffy the Vampire Slayer.

Although the industry at the time was all about the log line, which was very successful for writers like Joss Whedon, Noxon had to go through a process where she discarded that construct and got in touch with the vision that she felt connected to — and realised that all of the work she had been doing was in a vacuum. As a result, Noxon began writing plays and getting actors to speak her lines in order to get feedback and improve her writing. She said that for her it was about voice, not concept.

=== Buffy the Vampire Slayer ===
After the first season of episodes of Buffy the Vampire Slayer were produced, Noxon's agent encouraged her to watch them and try to take meetings and get on the show. Noxon was skeptical as she wasn't wowed by the concept, and knew the original film hadn't done well. After watching the initial episodes, she realized she loved the show, but was already booked to work on The Pretender, which was picked up to air, so seemed like it was a more safe bet.

In 1997, Noxon joined the writing staff of Buffy the Vampire Slayer for its second season. During her tenure there, she wrote or co-wrote 22 episodes of the series, half of these during her first two years on the show. Noxon described her experience on Buffy as charmed, as The WB Network allowed the show creators to work with little interference. The pace of the writing was extremely fast, with deadlines from 3 weeks to sometimes 4 days.

In 1998, beginning with its third season, Noxon became a co-producer of Buffy the Vampire Slayer. In 1999, upon the beginning of Buffy spin-off Angel, Noxon was promoted by series creator Joss Whedon to supervising producer for its fourth season, which gave her increasing charge of producing Buffy. During this season, Noxon cast Amber Benson as Tara Maclay.

Noxon co-produced the show over its fifth season (2000–2001) with fellow executive co-producer David Fury, and directed two episodes: "Into the Woods" and "Forever". She made a singing appearance in the sixth-season episode "Once More, with Feeling". At the season's conclusion, fan reaction was mixed, leading some to criticize Whedon for abandoning creative control and stewardship of Buffy to Noxon. In response, Whedon said:

Dis not th' Nox. [...] Marti [...] and I shaped this year very carefully, and while we made mistakes (as we do every year), we made our show. We explored what we wanted to, said what we meant. You don't have to like it, but don't think it comes from neglect.

— Joss Whedon, UPN Bronze VIP Archive for May 22, 2002 archived from the original on November 8, 2020

Noxon was executive producer of Buffy between 2001 and 2003, for its sixth and seventh seasons.

=== Other projects ===
In January 2002, a story written by Noxon and illustrated by Mike Huddleston was included in 9-11: Artists Respond, Volume One, an anthology graphic novel containing stories about the September 11 attacks.

In 2004, Noxon wrote and produced a pilot entitled Still Life for Fox about a family recovering from the death of their son, a police officer. Despite being picked up to series the show has never been aired in the U.S. as FOX cancelled the show after seven episodes were produced, due to the subject matter.

In January 2005, Noxon co-created the supernatural drama Point Pleasant with John McLaughlin. Despite an initial strong following, viewership dropped dramatically, and only 11 of the 13 filmed episodes were aired on Fox. In the fall of 2005, halfway through its first season, Noxon left Prison Break, where she had been a consulting producer. She said she wasn't connecting with the material and the vision of the writer's room.

In April 2006, Noxon joined the ABC drama Brothers & Sisters as showrunner. Four months later, she left the show. Press cited creative differences with creator Jon Robin Baitz, but he acknowledged differing visions and being new to the process of creating scripted television, said he was struggling with the practicalities of working on his first TV show. Greg Berlanti, Baitz' friend, stepped in to help out. In September 2006, Noxon joined the ABC medical drama Grey's Anatomy for its third season, as consulting producer. In February 2007, Noxon co-wrote the third-season Grey's Anatomy episode "Some Kind of Miracle" with series creator Shonda Rhimes.

In April 2007, Noxon left Grey's Anatomy to become executive producer and showrunner for Grey's spinoff Private Practice, which she did for one season. In late 2007, Noxon served as head writer during the first season of Private Practice.

In 2008, Noxon worked as a consulting producer on the AMC drama series Mad Men. Noxon said that working with Matthew Weiner was a dream, that it took her writing to a whole different level, and that with feedback from Weiner, was able to break herself of some habits that became ingrained after working on different shows for a while, like focusing on the theme of the show, etc. With Weiner on Mad Men, Noxon said she was able to re-connect with the purpose of writing better, and become more connected to what she was writing about. In 2008, Noxon co-wrote a second-season episode of the AMC drama series Mad Men, "The Inheritance", for which she was nominated for a 2009 Writers Guild of America Award for Best Dramatic Series. She won the WGA Award for Best Drama Series (after being nominated for the second consecutive year) at the February 2010 ceremony for her work on the third season of Mad Men.

In 2011, Noxon joined the writing team of FOX's Glee for its third season, she did not return for its fourth season.

In 2014, Noxon, along with co-creator Sarah Gertrude Shapiro, began working on the Lifetime comedy-drama series UnREAL. While working on UnREAL, Noxon was also working on Bravo's first original scripted TV series Girlfriends' Guide to Divorce. Noxon is also one of the executive producers of the CBS medical drama series Code Black which premiered in the fall of 2015.

=== Film ===
Noxon co-wrote the 1998 film Just a Little Harmless Sex with Roger Mills.

She wrote the screenplay of the 2011 remake of Fright Night, directed by Craig Gillespie.

She wrote and directed the 2017 film To the Bone.

== Personal life ==
Noxon met her now ex-husband Jeff Bynum while they were both working on Buffy the Vampire Slayer. She has two children.

Noxon said that her show, Girlfriends' Guide to Divorce, is not about her divorce, but is about divorce.

One of her hobbies is baking. As part of that interest, she opened a flour mill in Pasadena, California, called Grist & Toll that supplies local restaurants with ground flour for baking.

== Filmography ==
=== Television ===
Title	Year	Credited as				Network	Notes
Title	Year	Creator	Director	Writer	Executive producer	Network	Notes
Buffy the Vampire Slayer	1997	No	Yes	Yes	Yes	The WB (seasons 1–5); UPN (seasons 6–7)	
Angel	2000	No	No	Yes	No	The WB	Also consulting producer
Still Life	2003	No	No	Yes	No	Fox	
Point Pleasant	2005	Yes	No	Yes	Yes	Fox	
Brothers & Sisters	2006	No	No	Yes	Yes	ABC	
Grey's Anatomy	2007	No	No	Yes	Yes	ABC	Also consulting producer
Private Practice	2007–2008	No	No	Yes	Yes	ABC	
Mad Men	2008–2009	No	No	Yes	No	AMC	Consulting producer
Gigantic	2010	No	No	Yes	Yes	TeenNick	
Glee	2011–2012	No	No	Yes	No	Fox	Consulting producer
Unreal	2015–2018	Yes	No	Yes	Yes	Lifetime (2015–18); Hulu (2018)	
Girlfriends' Guide to Divorce	2014–2018	Yes	Yes	Yes	Yes	Bravo	
Code Black	2015–2017	No	No	Yes	Yes	CBS	
Dietland	2018	Yes	Yes	Yes	Yes	AMC	
Sharp Objects	2018	Yes	No	Yes	Yes	HBO	
The 45 Rules of Divorce	2021–2022	Yes	No	Yes	No	MBC 4 Shahid VIP; OSN Woman; OSN Yahala; OSN Series First; Dubai One	Arabic adaptation of Girlfriends' Guide to Divorce

=== Cinema ===
- Just a Little Harmless Sex (with Roger Mills) (1998)
- I Am Number Four (with Alfred Gough and Miles Millar) (2011)
- Fright Night (2011)
- To the Bone (2017) (writer and director)
- The Glass Castle (2017)

=== Television credits ===
==== Buffy the Vampire Slayer ====
Noxon joined the Buffy writing staff in the second season as a story editor and wrote several episodes in her first season. She was promoted to co-producer in season three, supervising producer in season four, co-executive producer in season five, and finally to executive producer in season six and also became the showrunner.

- 2x09 "What's My Line (Part 1)" (co-writer; with Howard Gordon)
- 2x10 "What's My Line (Part 2)" (writer)
- 2x12 "Bad Eggs" (writer)
- 2x13 "Surprise" (writer)
- 2x16 "Bewitched, Bothered and Bewildered" (writer)
- 2x19 "I Only Have Eyes for You" (writer)
- 3x02 "Dead Man's Party" (writer)
- 3x04 "Beauty and the Beasts" (writer)
- 3x09 "The Wish" (writer)
- 3x15 "Consequences" (writer)
- 3x20 "The Prom" (writer)
- 4x02 "Living Conditions" (writer)
- 4x06 "Wild at Heart" (writer)
- 4x11 "Doomed (co-writer; with David Fury and Jane Espenson)
- 4x14 "Goodbye Iowa" (writer)
- 4x19 "New Moon Rising" (writer)
- 5x01 "Buffy vs. Dracula" (writer)
- 5x10 "Into the Woods" (writer and director)
- 5x17 "Forever" (writer and director)
- 6x01 "Bargaining (Part 1)" (writer)
- 6x10 "Wrecked" (writer)
- 6x20 "Villains" (writer)
- 7x07 "Conversations with Dead People" (uncredited writer)
- 7x10 "Bring on the Night" (co-writer; with Doug Petrie)

==== Angel ====
Noxon served as consulting producer for the first three seasons of Angel, doing several uncredited rewrites.

- 1x13 "She" (co-writer; with David Greenwalt)

==== Point Pleasant ====
Noxon served as executive producer and showrunner on the series.

- 1x01 "Pilot" (co-writer; with John J. McLaughlin)
- 1x02 "Human Nature" (writer)
- 1x13 "Let the War Commence" (co-writer; with Jenny Lynn)

==== Private Practice ====
Noxon served as an executive producer for the first two seasons of Private Practice.

- 1x03 "In Which Addison Finds the Magic" (co-writer; with Shonda Rhimes)
- 1x05 "In Which Addison Finds a Showerhead" (co-writer; with Shonda Rhimes)
- 2x01 "A Family Thing" (co-writer; with Shonda Rhimes)

==== Glee ====
Noxon served as consulting producer and writer for the third season. On June 4, 2012, she announced that she would not return for the fourth season.

- 3x09 "Extraordinary Merry Christmas" (writer)
- 3x18 "Choke" (writer)

==== Dietland ====
Noxon is serving as show-runner, executive producer, writer, and is also directing some episodes.

- 1x01 "Pilot"
- 1x02 "Tender Belly"

==== Sharp Objects ====
Noxon is the creator, executive producer, and writer for the HBO 8-part miniseries Sharp Objects, adapted from Gillian Flynn's novel of the same name. The project was initially planned as a feature film, but Noxon convinced the network that the story would work better as a limited series. The show, which premiered on July 8, 2018, is directed by Big Little Lies director Jean-Marc Vallée and stars Amy Adams, Patricia Clarkson and Chris Messina.

== See also ==
- Mutant Enemy Productions
