= Secrets of the Titanic =

1986 documentary film

Secrets of the Titanic is a documentary, made and filmed over 1985, 1986, and 1987. Produced by the National Geographic Society, it was a National Geographic Video exclusive, narrated by Martin Sheen, written and produced by Nicolas Noxon consisting of historical photos and footage of the massive steamer being built and launched, the discovery and exploration by Dr. Robert Ballard, and a look inside the wreck, not only the ship itself, but the human story and sinking theories. At a cost of $19.95, the video release sold 30,000 copies by March 1998.

== Background ==
At the time, young undersea explorer Bob Ballard develops the technology and the U.S. Navy sponsors an expedition. The date is September 1, 1985, the search has been going on for 56 days when Argo's camera shows wreckage, then one of Titanic's massive boilers. Then it follows Ballard in his exploration the next year, along with Martin Bowen, the pilot of the undersea robot (ROV), Jason Jr., which was mounted in a "garage" on the front of the DSV Alvin.
