= Growing Pains (British TV series) =

British television series

- Genre: Comedy drama
- Written by: Steve Wetton
- Directed by: Michael Simpson
- Starring: Ray Brooks; Sharon Duce; Rosemary Leach; Lily Collins; Tat Whalley; Peter Lloyd; Rosie Marcel; Liz Crowther; Lill Roughley; Trevor Peacock; Kevin Oliver Jones
- Composer: Nigel Hess
- Country of origin: United Kingdom
- Original language: English
- No. of series: 2
- No. of episodes: 20

Production
- Producer: Richard Bramall
- Running time: 51 minutes
- Production company: BBC Productions

Original release
- Network: BBC1
- Release: 16 May 1992 – 14 July 1993

Growing Pains is a British television series aired by the BBC on BBC1. The show ran for two series, from 16 May 1992 to 14 July 1993, and was unrelated to the 80s American sitcom of the same name. Growing Pains is a family comedy drama about a middle-aged couple, Tom and Pat Hollingsworth, who decide to become foster parents. The show relates the consequences this decision has on their lives and the tensions it causes between them and their own three children. The TV series was a continuation of the 1989–1990 radio series by the same name, which was written by, and partly based on the real-life experiences of Steve Wetton.

Growing Pains is the debut acting role of actress Lily Collins, two and a half years old when she appeared on the show.

The lead roles of Pat and Tom Hollingsworth were played by Ray Brooks and Sharon Duce in both the radio show and the television series. The television cast of the Hollingsworth family included Tat Whalley as Mark Hollingsworth, Peter Lloyd as Simon Hollingsworth, and Rosie Marcel as Lisa Hollingsworth. Liz Crowther, Lill Roughley and Trevor Peacock also appeared regularly on the show.

The show's musical theme was composed by Nigel Hess.
