= To the Bone (film) =

American drama film by Marti Noxon

- Official release poster
- Directed by: Marti Noxon
- Written by: Marti Noxon
- Produced by: Bonnie Curtis; Karina Miller; Julie Lynn; Andrea Iervolino
- Starring: Lily Collins; Keanu Reeves; Carrie Preston; Lili Taylor; Alex Sharp; Liana Liberato
- Cinematography: Richard Wong
- Edited by: Elliot Greenberg
- Music by: Fil Eisler
- Production companies: AMBI Group; Sparkhouse Media; Foxtail Entertainment; Mockingbird Pictures; To The Bone Productions
- Distributed by: Netflix
- Release dates: January 22, 2017 (Sundance); July 14, 2017 (Netflix)
- Running time: 108 minutes
- Country: United States
- Language: English

To the Bone is a 2017 American drama film, written and directed by Marti Noxon. The film follows a young woman, portrayed by Lily Collins, as she battles anorexia. The film premiered in competition at the Sundance Film Festival on January 22, 2017, as a contender in the U.S. Dramatic Competition. It was released worldwide on Netflix on July 14, 2017. Netflix's release of the film was met with controversy, with some arguing that the film glamorises anorexia.

== Plot ==
Ellen is a 20-year-old college dropout dealing with anorexia, who returns home to the house of her stepmother and father after struggling through an in-patient program and failing to make any progress. With her absentee father unwilling to deal with her, Ellen's stepmother, Susan, sets her up with a specialist, Dr. William Beckham, who insists that Ellen join his patient program. Ellen is reluctant to do so, but her mind is changed by her younger half sister, Kelly.

Ellen moves into the house with six other patients, who include five young women and Luke, an upbeat ballet dancer, who is near recovery from both his anorexia and a knee injury. Luke acts as a moral cheerleader for the others and takes a special interest in Ellen, eventually revealing that he is a fan of Ellen's art.

At a family-therapy session with Beckham, Ellen's father fails to show up. Until 18 months earlier, Ellen was living with her mother, who abandoned her to move to Phoenix, Arizona, with a lesbian partner. It is revealed that previous artwork she had posted on Tumblr was cited as an influence by a girl who later died by suicide. Ellen promises to try to do better, but instead continues to lose weight.

Ellen makes headway, changing her name to Eli and bonding with the other members of the house. She is surprised, however, when Luke kisses her and admits he is starting to fall in love with her. She panics and quickly rejects him.

Later on, she learns that Megan, another woman in the house, miscarried her baby, having resumed her purging after reaching 12 weeks gestation and believing it was safe. The event sends Eli into a tailspin, and she decides to leave.

On Eli's way out, Luke begs her to stay, telling her that he needs her, as he realizes that his knee condition is permanent and he will never be able to properly dance again and needs something new on which to focus. Eli leaves anyway.

Near death, Eli goes to her mother's home. That night, her mother expresses guilt for the postpartum depression she had after giving birth to Ellen and suggests that she might try feeding Eli with a bottle while rocking her to help solve both their issues. Eli finds the idea strange, but after her mother tells her that she accepts if she chooses death, she decides to go along with the idea and allows herself to be rocked while her mother holds her in her lap and feeds her rice milk from a bottle.

After eating, Eli goes for a walk at night. Passing out, she hallucinates that she is in a tree where she kisses Luke, who is able to get her to see how sick she is. He gives her a piece of coal that represents her courage, and she swallows it.

Waking up from her dream, Eli decides to return home. She embraces her stepmother and her half sister before continuing on in Beckham's patient program.

== Cast ==
- Lily Collins as Ellen (Eli), a 20-year-old patient with anorexia
- Keanu Reeves as Dr. William Beckham (Beck)
- Carrie Preston as Susan, Ellen's (paternal) stepmother
- Lili Taylor as Judy, Ellen's mother
- Alex Sharp as Luke, 19-year-old patient with anorexia
- Liana Liberato as Kelly, Ellen's 18-year-old (paternal) half sister
- Brooke Smith as Olive, Judy's wife, Ellen's (maternal) stepmother
- Leslie Bibb as Megan, a patient with anorexia and bulimia
- Kathryn Prescott as Anna, a patient with bulimia
- Ciara Bravo as Tracy, a patient with bulimia
- Maya Eshet as Pearl, a patient with anorexia
- Lindsay McDowell as Kendra, a patient with binge eating disorder
- Retta as Lobo, the in-patient nurse
- Alanna Ubach as Karen, the therapist

== Production ==
In March 2016, Lily Collins was announced to have been cast in a leading role in an anorexia drama film titled To the Bone, written and directed by Marti Noxon, based on Noxon's experiences with the eating disorder. The film marks Noxon's feature directorial debut. Later that month, Keanu Reeves joined the cast, portraying the role of a doctor. On March 29, Carrie Preston was cast as Collins' character's stepmother. AMBI Group was later reported to be co-producing and financing the picture. In early April, Lili Taylor, Alex Sharp, Brooke Smith, and Liana Liberato were reported as joining the cast of the film in undisclosed roles. On April 11, Ciara Bravo was cast in the supporting role of Tracy, a young girl also suffering from an eating disorder.

Principal photography began in late March 2016 in Los Angeles. Lily Collins reportedly lost around 20lbs for the role.

== Release ==
The film held its world premiere at the Sundance Film Festival on January 22, 2017. It was featured as a contender in the U.S. Dramatic Competition. In 2017, Netflix acquired distribution rights to the film and was released worldwide on July 14, 2017.

== Reception ==
To the Bone holds a 70% approval rating on Rotten Tomatoes, based on 66 reviews, with an average rating of 6.6/10. The website's critical consensus reads, "To the Bone offers an insightful, empathetic look at a widespread issue, led by exemplary work from Lily Collins in the central role." Metacritic gives the film an average score of 64 out of 100 based on 14 critics, indicating "generally favorable reviews".

Justin Chang of Los Angeles Times wrote that the film was "part character study, part PSA" and that it "chronicles a brief but meaningful period in its protagonist’s healing journey." Chang said of Lily Collins' performance, "In a different film, Ellen's sharp tongue might have made her an insufferable fount of wisecracking negativity, but Collins' performance is subtler than that, and the script gives her ample opportunity to reveal the character's more complicated, vulnerable edges." Writing in The Guardian, Hadley Freeman was critical of the film, describing it as "shallow, sexist and sick".

Backlash to the film was expressed in a variety of UK media outlets. New Statesman published an article titled "Why Netflix's To the Bone could be triggering", in which Anna Leszkiewicz wrote that "Within hours of its release, screenshots and quotes from the trailer had made their way to pro-ana thinspo blogs" and compared the imagery of the film to pre-existing online pro-ana imagery.

National British eating disorder charity Beat released a statement in response to the release of the film that read, "We would strongly urge anyone that might be at risk of an eating disorder to think very carefully before watching this film."

In response to criticisms, director Marti Noxon said, "My goal with the film was not to glamourise [eating disorders], but to serve as a conversation starter about an issue that is too often clouded by secrecy and misconceptions. I hope that by casting a little light into the darkness of this disease we can achieve greater understanding and guide people to help if they need it."
