= Edward Cowart =

American judge (1925–1987)

- Born: Edward Douglas Cowart; February 17, 1925; Plant City, Florida, U.S.
- Died: August 3, 1987 (aged 62); Miami, Florida, U.S.
- Education: University of Miami (BA); Stetson University College of Law (JD)
- Known for: Presiding judge at the trial of serial killer Ted Bundy

Edward Douglas Cowart (February 17, 1925 – August 3, 1987) was an American judge who served as a Dade County Circuit Court Judge. He presided over Ted Bundy's Chi Omega trial in 1979.

== Early life and education ==
Edward Douglas Cowart was born in Plant City, Florida. He served as a Miami police officer before entering the judiciary. Cowart received his Bachelor of Arts at the University of Miami in 1950 and his Juris Doctor from Stetson University College of Law in 1952. He sat on the bench for 14 years, where he was known for frequent biblical quotations in the courtroom.

== Bundy trial ==
Cowart is best known as the presiding judge at the trial of serial killer Ted Bundy, a one-time law student who was arrested for a series of murders from at least 1974 to 1978 and who represented himself in court. Cowart imposed a death sentence, and is remembered for his post-sentencing remarks to Bundy:

The court finds that both of these killings were indeed heinous, atrocious and cruel. And that they were extremely wicked, shockingly evil, vile and the product of a design to inflict a high degree of pain and utter indifference to human life. This court, independent of, but in agreement with the advisory sentence rendered by the jury does hereby impose the death penalty upon the defendant Theodore Robert Bundy.

It is further ordered that on such scheduled date that you'll be put to death by a current of electricity, sufficient to cause your immediate death, and such current of electricity shall continue to pass through your body until you are dead.

Take care of yourself, young man. I say that to you sincerely; take care of yourself. It is an utter tragedy for this court to see such a total waste of humanity, I think, as I've experienced in this courtroom.

You're a bright young man. You'd have made a good lawyer and I would have loved to have you practice in front of me, but you went another way, partner. I don't feel any animosity toward you. I want you to know that. Once again, take care of yourself.

— Judge Edward Cowart

== Death ==
Cowart died of a heart attack at the age of 62. Bundy was executed two years later in 1989 after failing in numerous appeals to Cowart and the Court of Appeals, seeking to overturn his sentence or be granted a new trial.
