= Amazon Fishbowl =

Online talk show on Amazon

Amazon Fishbowl was a short-lived online talk show on Amazon.com hosted by Bill Maher that featured information and interviews related to recently released books, music, and movies. Amazon Fishbowl debuted on June 1, 2006 and was discontinued in late 2007 after 12 episodes.

An Amazon spokesman said the show was created to eliminate the "separation between the artist discovery experience and the follow-up purchase opportunity".

== Format ==
Amazon Fishbowl followed a traditional talk-show format, with a short comedy monologue, short interview segments and a musical performance, interspersed with Amazon-related promotions. Notable guests Maher interviewed included Rob Thomas, Soul Asylum, Dixie Chicks, Stephen King, and Dashboard Confessional.
