= Rejuvenile (book) =

2006 non-fiction book by Christopher Noxon

Rejuvenile: Kickball, Cartoons, Cupcakes, and the Reinvention of the American Grown-up
- Author: Christopher Noxon
- Language: English
- Genre: Non-fiction
- Publisher: Crown Publishing
- Publication date: 2006

Rejuvenile: Kickball, Cartoons, Cupcakes, and the Reinvention of the American Grown-up is a non-fiction book written by author Christopher Noxon and published by Crown Publishing in 2006. The term "rejuvenile" refers to people who "cultivate tastes and mindsets traditionally associated with those younger than themselves".

Noxon has said that feels that being childlike can be good, but being childish is not. "There's a big difference between childish and childlike. And childish is sort of impatient and silly and ridiculous and temper tantrums and brat behavior, and childlike is open and creative and flexible."

== Summary ==
Noxon explores adults who behave and think in childlike and childish ways, and concludes that their behavior is not necessarily a bad thing. According to the book, many rejuveniles have found ways to lead productive and responsible lives without tossing aside things they've always loved—from Necco Wafers to The Adventures of Tintin to skateboarding. The book has numerous stories about like-minded adults who pursue activities such as playing dodgeball on the weekends, going to Walt Disney World Resort (without kids), and collecting toys.

== Other media ==
- Noxon has conducted radio interviews with Talk of the Nation, WHYY-FM, KMOX, and Money Matters Financial Network.
- In print, Rejuvenile has been featured in coverage of USA Today, The Globe and Mail, CBS News, and Detroit Free Press.
