= Betty Lane =

American artist

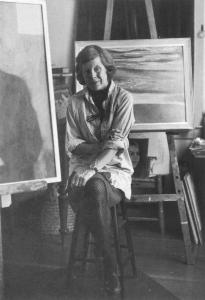
- Betty Lane at work, 1960s
- Born: Elizabeth Thoburn Lane; September 30, 1907; Washington, D.C., U.S.
- Died: 1996 (aged 88–89); Brewster, Massachusetts, U.S.
- Education: Corcoran College of Art and Design, Massachusetts Normal Art School
- Known for: Painting
- Movement: Modernism

Betty Lane (September 30, 1907 – 1996) was an American artist.

Lane's first exhibition was at the Phillips Memorial Gallery in 1931. Lane created figure subjects, portraits, and landscapes executed in watercolor and oil. Her work includes nature and street scenes in the Americas and Europe, domestic scenes, and grotesques.

Lane's work is included in the permanent collections of the Metropolitan Museum of Art, The Phillips Collection, the Provincetown Art Association and Museum, and the Cape Cod Museum of Art.

== Life ==
Born in Washington, D.C., on 30 September 1907, Betty (born Elizabeth Thoburn) Lane was the youngest of six children born to a Marine officer, Rufus Herman Lane and Gertrude Eleanor Mills. Lane began painting in watercolor around age nine. After high school Lane enrolled at the Corcoran College of Art and Design. Unhappy at Corcoran, she transferred to the Massachusetts Normal Art School.

== Career ==
In 1928 Lane traveled to Paris and studied with André Lhote. In 1929 Lane returned to the United States, living in Falls Church, Virginia, and Washington, D.C. It was during this period that Lane's work came to the attention of Duncan Phillips. In April 1931 Lane was part of an exhibition at the Phillips Memorial Gallery with John Marin and Harold Weston.

Between 1930 and 1939 Lane lived in Cambridge, England, and Paris, France. From 1939 to 1946 Lane was living in Ontario, Canada.

In 1946 Lane moved to the United States, teaching at Miss Porter's School from 1952 until 1965. During this time Lane began making works in woodblock printing, silkscreen, ceramics, and glass.

After 1960 Lane lived in Brewster, Massachusetts, visiting Greece, Mexico, the Soviet Union, and Australia. Lane died in Brewster, Massachusetts, in 1996.

In 1977, Lane became an associate of the Women's Institute for Freedom of the Press (WIFP). WIFP is an American nonprofit publishing organization. The organization works to increase communication between women and connect the public with forms of women-based media.

== Gallery ==
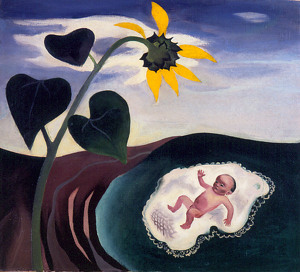
The Sunflower, 1937

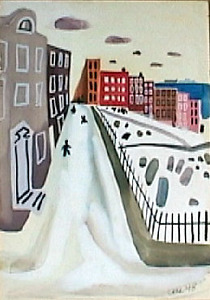
Snow Hill, Boston, 1940s

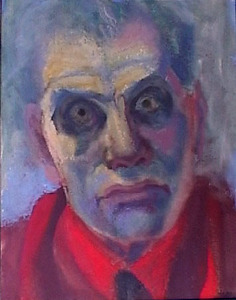
You Can't Trust Kruschev, 1964

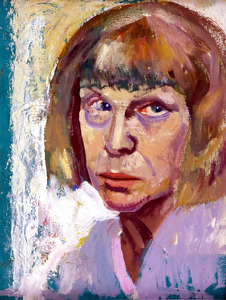
Retired Liberation, 1966

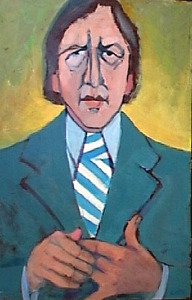
Theory On TV, 1973

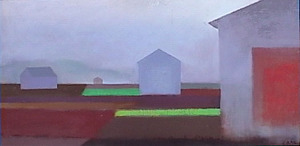
June Morning, 1980s

== Exhibitions ==
- 1931 Washington, D.C. Phillips Memorial Gallery. “April Exhibitions at the Phillips Memorial Gallery. John Marin, Harold Weston, Betty Lane.”
- 1931 Washington, D.C. Phillips Memorial Gallery. "Watercolors by Betty Lane 1931 (The Washington Room)."
- 1932 New York. Delphic Studios.
- 1941 New York. Galerie St. Etienne.
- 1944 Washington, D.C. Whyte Gallery.
- 1944 New York. Galerie St. Etienne.
- 1945 Ontario. Ontario Society of Artists.
- 1948 New York. 44th Street Gallery.
- 1948 Barnstable, Massachusetts. Cape Cod Art Association.
- 1958 Buffalo, New York. Carl Bredemeier Gallery.
- 1997 Dennis, MA. Cape Cod Museum of Art. "Betty Lane: Painting a Life."
- 1999 Provincetown, Massachusetts. Julie Heller Gallery.
- 2006 Santa Barbara, California. Sullivan Goss. "Betty Lane: The Road Less Taken."
- 2008 Santa Barbara, California. Sullivan Goss.
