= Cape Cod Museum of Art =

Art museum in Massachusetts, US

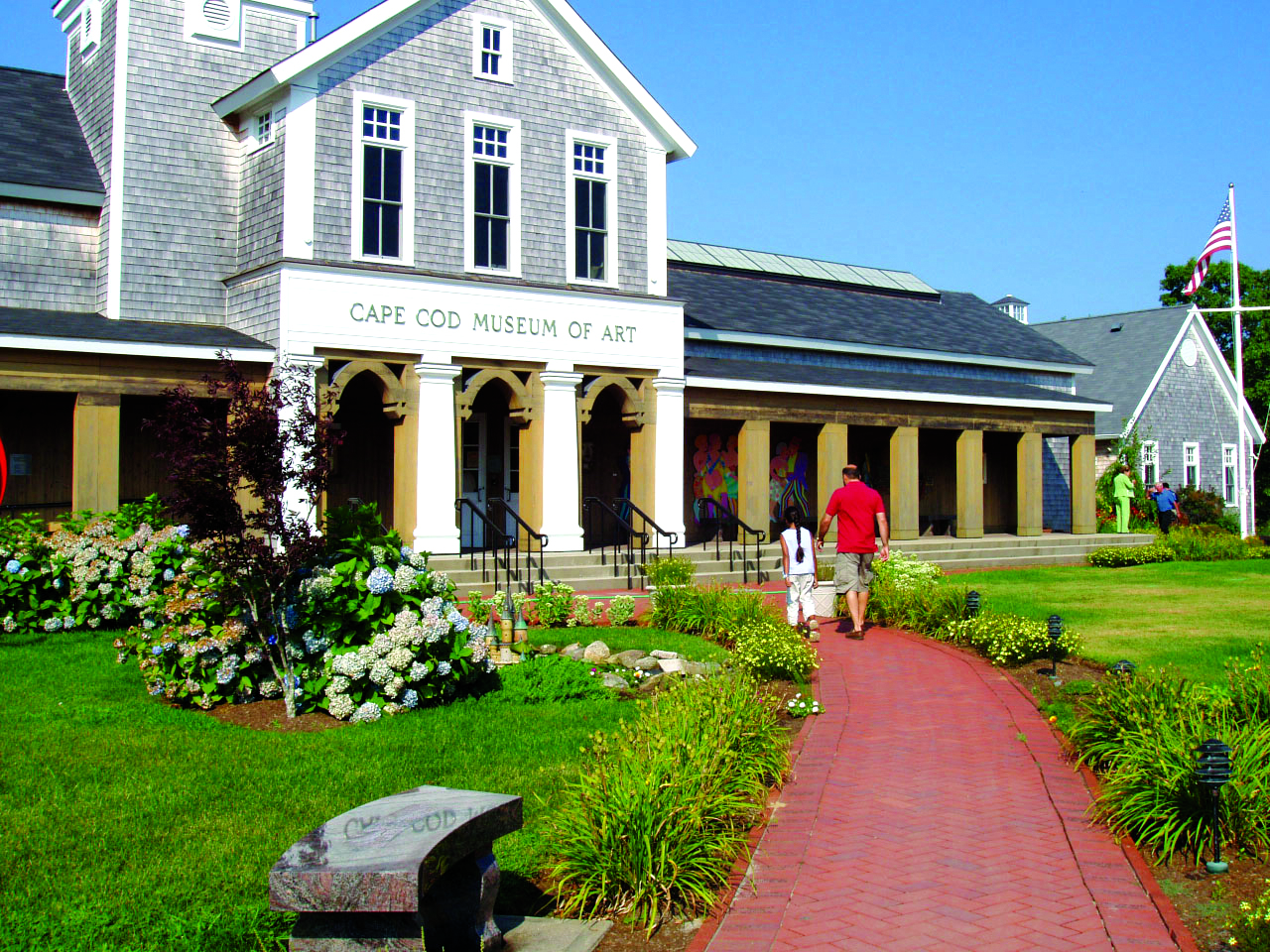
- Museum entrance

- Location of the museum in Cape Cod, Massachusetts Cape Cod Museum of Art (Massachusetts)
- Former name: Cape Museum of Fine Art, Scargo Lake Museum
- Established: 1981
- Location: 60 Hope Lane; Dennis, MA 02638, USA
- Coordinates: 41.740354°N 70.189912°W
- Type: Art museum
- Director: Michael Rabideau
- President: Deborah Steiger
- Curator: Benton Jones
- Website: www.ccmoa.org

Cape Cod Museum of Art is an art museum in the town of Dennis in Barnstable County, Massachusetts, United States in the center of the region Cape Cod.

== History ==
In 1980, sculptor and artist Harry Holl was inspired by his father-in-law Arnold Geissbuhler. With the help of his friend, and lawyer, Roy Freed, they proposed the creation of an art museum that would both preserve and display the work of generations of artists associated with Cape Cod and the Islands. With a small group of artists, educators, and community activists, Scargo Lake Museum was incorporated January 28, 1981.

In 1982, Scargo Lake Museum changed its name to the Cape Museum of Fine Art. A Charter Membership drive began, and by 1985 the Museum had gained nearly 1,000 members. The Museum was located at a rented storefront on Route 6A in Dennis Village at a storefront in Theatre Marketplace.

In 1984, the Trustees of the Museum wanted to facilitate growth by finding a permanent location. They signed an agreement with the Raymond Moore Foundation to lease an acre of land on the grounds of the Cape Playhouse to "erect a fine arts museum for the Cape." Then, in 1986 the Davenport West family donated a building to permanently house the growing Museum collections and be a permanent establishment on the Cape Playhouse Grounds. A $300,000 campaign was established called "Museum on the Move" to fund the transport, construction, and foundation of this new building from South Harwich, Massachusetts to Dennis, Massachusetts. The building was officially moved in September of 1987 on seven trucks, divided into 11 pieces. The caravan traveled down Route 6, to Old Bass River Road, and Route 6A to reach the Playhouse grounds and it was broadcast on local news.

1987 - 1990 the Museum continued to host exhibitions and events at the Theatre Marketplace location until the new building was reconstructed. In 1990, the Museum officially moved in to it's new location, despite it being unfinished.

Under the leadership of Board President Joe Signore, the Trustees launched a three-phase capital campaign to fund the needed renovations. These improvements included seven climate controlled galleries, an auditorium, sculpture garden, museum shop, administrative offices, conference room, library, art storage, and an elevator. The last part of the campaign funded the building of the Weny Education Center, an addition on the north side of the building that is a studio for classes and events for adults and children.

In 2004, the Cape Museum of Fine Arts changed its name to the Cape Cod Museum of Art to enhance the museum's mission and include a broader variety of artists who create art on Cape Cod and the Islands.
