= The Chamber =

The Chamber may refer to:

- The Chamber (novel), a 1994 novel by John Grisham
- The Chamber (1996 film), a film based on the novel by John Grisham
- The Chamber (2016 film), a survival film about four people trapped in a submersible at the bottom of the ocean
- The Chamber (game show), a 2002 game show
- "The Chamber" (song), a 2014 song by Lenny Kravitz
