= James Foley (director) =

American film director and screenwriter (1953–2025)

- Born: December 28, 1953; New York City, U.S.
- Died: May 6, 2025 (aged 71); Los Angeles, California, U.S.
- Other name: Peter Percher
- Education: State University of New York at Buffalo (BS); University of Southern California (MFA)
- Occupations: Director, screenwriter
- Years active: 1984–2018

James Foley (December 28, 1953 – May 6, 2025) was an American director of film, television and music videos. His notable works included At Close Range (1986), After Dark, My Sweet (1990), Glengarry Glen Ross (1992), Fear (1996), Fifty Shades Darker (2017), and Fifty Shades Freed (2018). He was a regular collaborator of Madonna during the 1980s, directing her in the film Who's That Girl (1987) and in several music videos.

== Early life and education ==
Foley was born in Bay Ridge, Brooklyn, New York, on December 28, 1953, but grew up in Staten Island, New York, the son of a lawyer. He graduated from the State University of New York at Buffalo, a flagship school of the SUNY system, in 1974, with a degree in psychology. While he initially planned to become a doctor, he decided to pursue filmmaking instead, and went on to earn an MFA in film study and production from the University of Southern California in 1979. During his final year there, director Hal Ashby noticed his student film when it was projected on the wall during a film-school projection party and urged him to write something for Ashby's newly formed production company. The company went broke before Foley finished writing, but the stamp of approval was enough to get his career started with his first directing gig on the low budget 1984 teen drama Reckless. In his own assessment, Foley said: “Because Hal Ashby had hired me, I became viable in that weird calculus of Hollywood just because someone else who was respected thought that I was viable”.

== Career ==
In 1984, Foley made his directorial debut with Reckless, which starred Aidan Quinn and Daryl Hannah. His 1986 film At Close Range was entered into the 36th Berlin International Film Festival.

In 1990, he wrote and directed After Dark, My Sweet, an adaptation of the Jim Thompson novel of the same name. Film critic Roger Ebert included the film as part of his Great Movies list saying, "After Dark, My Sweet is the movie that eluded audiences; it grossed less than $3 million, has been almost forgotten, and remains one of the purest and most uncompromising of modern film noir. It captures above all the lonely, exhausted lives of its characters." He directed Glengarry Glen Ross, based on the play of the same name by David Mamet, in 1992. The Chamber was based on the novel of the same name by author John Grisham. The Corruptor, his action film starring Chow Yun-Fat and Mark Wahlberg, was released in 1999.

His 2003 film, Confidence, starred Edward Burns. He directed Perfect Stranger, a thriller film starring Halle Berry, in 2007. His last films were the two sequels to Fifty Shades of Grey: Fifty Shades Darker (2017) and Fifty Shades Freed (2018).

Foley also directed for television, including 12 episodes of the Netflix series House of Cards.

He often collaborated with cinematographer Juan Ruiz Anchía, having made five films with him, as well as Madonna's "Live to Tell" music video.

== Death ==
Foley died from brain cancer at his home in Los Angeles, on May 6, 2025, at the age of 71.

== Filmography ==
Film

- Reckless (1984)
- At Close Range (1986)
- Who's That Girl (1987)
- After Dark, My Sweet (1990) (Also writer)
- Glengarry Glen Ross (1992)
- Two Bits (1995)
- Fear (1996)
- The Chamber (1996)
- The Corruptor (1999)
- Confidence (2003)
- Perfect Stranger (2007)
- Fifty Shades Darker (2017)
- Fifty Shades Freed (2018)

Television

Year	Title	Notes
1991	Twin Peaks	Episode "Wounds and Scars"
1997	Gun	Episode "The Shot"
2004	Hollywood Division	TV movie
2013	Hannibal	Episode "Sorbet"
2013–2015	House of Cards	12 episodes
2014	Red Zone	TV movie
2015	Wayward Pines	Episode "The Truth"
2016	Billions	Episodes "Short Squeeze" and "The Deal"

== Music videos ==
Besides the film Who's That Girl (1987), Foley directed the following music videos for Madonna (under the pseudonym "Peter Percher").

- "Live to Tell" (1986)
- "Papa Don't Preach" (1986)
- "True Blue" (1986)

Foley was also the best man at Madonna's wedding to Sean Penn, although as of 2025, they were not on speaking terms.

In 1990, Foley directed Deep Purple for the "King of Dreams" video, with the opening track for the album "Slaves and Masters". In a contemporary MTV interview, organ player Jon Lord said it was the first time he actually had fun doing a music video.

== Awards and nominations ==
Year	Award	Category	Title	Result
1986	Berlin Film Festival	Golden Bear Award	At Close Range	Nominated
1992	Deauville American Film Festival	Critics Award	Glengarry Glen Ross	Nominated
1988	Golden Raspberry Awards	Worst Director	Who's That Girl	Nominated
2018	Golden Raspberry Awards	Worst Director	Fifty Shades Darker	Nominated
2019	Golden Raspberry Awards	Worst Director	Fifty Shades Freed	Nominated
2003	Phoenix Film Festival	Copper Wing Tribute		Won
1992	Venice Film Festival	Golden Lion	Glengarry Glen Ross	Nominated
