= The Deliberate Stranger =

Novel and American TV series

- VHS cover
- Genre: Crime; drama; thriller
- Based on: The Deliberate Stranger by Richard W. Larsen
- Screenplay by: Hesper Anderson
- Directed by: Marvin J. Chomsky
- Starring: Mark Harmon; Frederic Forrest; George Grizzard; Ben Masters; Glynnis O'Connor; M. Emmet Walsh
- Theme music composer: Gil Mellé
- Country of origin: United States
- Original language: English

Production
- Executive producer: Malcolm Stuart
- Producer: Marvin J. Chomsky
- Cinematography: Michael D. Margulies
- Editors: Lori Jane Coleman; Howard Kunin; Ronald LaVine
- Running time: 188 minutes
- Production companies: Stuart Phoenix Productions; Lorimar-Telepictures

Original release
- Network: NBC
- Release: May 4 – May 5, 1986

The Deliberate Stranger is a book about American serial killer Ted Bundy written by Seattle Times reporter Richard W. Larsen that was published in 1980. The book spawned a television miniseries of the same title, starring Mark Harmon as Bundy, that aired on NBC on May 4–5, 1986.

== Book ==
Bundy: The Deliberate Stranger was written by Seattle Times reporter Richard W. Larsen and published in 1980. Larsen covered politics for the Times and had interviewed Bundy in 1972, several years before he became a murder suspect, when Bundy worked as a volunteer for the re-election campaign of Gov. Daniel J. Evans and had been seen trailing the campaign of Evans' Democratic opponent with a video camera.

Larsen would go on to cover the "Ted" murders in 1974, when Bundy was first identified as a suspect in Seattle area homicides, and then cover the Ted Bundy story up until Bundy's execution in 1989. Bundy: The Deliberate Stranger was published in paperback in editions as late as 1990 but has since gone out of print.

== Television miniseries ==
The Deliberate Stranger was adapted into a two-part television miniseries originally broadcast on NBC on May 4 and 5, 1986. The miniseries, based on Larsen's book, starred Mark Harmon as Bundy. Parts of the miniseries were shot in Salt Lake City and at Utah State Prison as well as Farmington, Utah and Seattle, Washington.

The miniseries omits Bundy's childhood, early life, and first six known victims (five murders and the first victim who survived), picking up the story with the murder of Georgann Hawkins and following Bundy's further crimes in Washington, Utah, Colorado and Florida. Frederic Forrest starred as Seattle detective Robert D. Keppel, and George Grizzard played reporter Larsen.

=== Cast ===
- Mark Harmon as Ted Bundy
- Frederic Forrest as Detective Bob Keppel
- George Grizzard as Richard Larsen
- Ben Masters as Detective Mike Fisher
- Glynnis O'Connor as Cas Richter
- Maia Brewton as Jenny Richter
- M. Emmet Walsh as Detective Sam Davies
- John Ashton as Detective Roger Dunn
- Bonnie Bartlett as Louise Bundy
- Billy "Green" Bush as Officer Bradley
- Frederick Coffin as Jerry Thompson
- Deborah Goodrich as Martha Chambers
- Lawrence Pressman as Ken Wolverton
- Macon McCalman as Larsen's Editor
- Jeannetta Arnette as Barbara
- William Boyett as Aspen Detective
- Emily Longstreth as Susan Delgato (Based on Carol DaRonch)
- Harry Northup as Tom Hargreaves
- Terry Farrell as Katie Hargreaves
- Ann Ryerson as Mrs. Hargreaves

=== Broadcast technical difficulties ===
During the second part's broadcast, a few NBC affiliates (including WPXI channel 11 Pittsburgh, Pennsylvania and KPRC channel 2 Houston, Texas) were interrupted by a frozen scene and a static sound until placing their own technical difficulties tel-op graphics for less than 30 seconds before returning to its fixed program.

=== Reception ===
Bundy's lawyer Polly Nelson, in her book Defending the Devil, characterized the miniseries as "stunningly accurate" and said it did not portray anything that was not proven to be factual. She singled out praise for Harmon's portrayal of Bundy, noting how Harmon reproduced Bundy's rigid posture and suspicious expression. According to Nelson, her client, still on death row when the program aired, showed no interest in seeing the miniseries.

Ann Rule, who had known Bundy before the murders when they worked together on a suicide crisis hotline (Jeannetta Arnette played a character based on Rule), felt that Harmon's portrayal missed the insecurities that lurked under Bundy's confident façade. Harmon was nominated for a Golden Globe for his portrayal of Bundy.

According to The New York Times, the two shows ranked seventeenth and sixth in the Nielsen ratings. Howard Rosenberg of the Los Angeles Times described it as "taut, suspenseful, scary".
