= Your Friends & Neighbors =

Your Friends & Neighbors may refer to:

- Your Friends & Neighbors (film), a 1998 black comedy
- Your Friends & Neighbors (TV series), an American dark comedy crime drama
