= Speed 2: Cruise Control =

1997 film by Jan de Bont

- Theatrical release poster
- Directed by: Jan de Bont
- Screenplay by: Randall McCormick; Jeff Nathanson
- Story by: Jan de Bont; Randall McCormick
- Based on: Characters created by Graham Yost
- Produced by: Jan de Bont; Steve Perry; Michael Peyser
- Starring: Sandra Bullock; Jason Patric; Willem Dafoe; Temuera Morrison; Glenn Plummer
- Cinematography: Jack N. Green
- Edited by: Alan Cody
- Music by: Mark Mancina
- Production company: Blue Tulip Productions
- Distributed by: 20th Century Fox
- Release date: June 13, 1997
- Running time: 125 minutes
- Country: United States
- Language: English
- Budget: $110–160 million
- Box office: $164.5 million

Speed 2: Cruise Control is a 1997 American action thriller film produced and directed by Jan de Bont from a screenplay by Randall McCormick and Jeff Nathanson. It is the sequel to Speed (1994) and stars Sandra Bullock (reprising her role from the first film), Jason Patric and Willem Dafoe. Its plot follows Annie Porter (Bullock) and Alex Shaw (Patric), a couple who go on vacation to the Caribbean aboard a luxury cruise ship, which is hijacked by John Geiger, a terrorist (Dafoe). While trapped aboard the ship, Annie and Alex work with the ship's first officer to try to stop it after they discover it is programmed to crash into an oil tanker.

De Bont had the idea for the film after having a recurring nightmare about a cruise ship crashing into an island. Speed star Keanu Reeves was initially supposed to reprise his role as Jack Traven for the sequel, but decided not to commit and was replaced by Patric before filming. The writers had to rework the script to accommodate the addition of a new character. Production took place aboard Seabourn Legend, the ship on which the film is set. The final scene, in which the ship crashes into the island of Saint Martin, cost almost a quarter of the budget, and set records as the largest and most expensive stunt ever filmed. Many interior scenes aboard the ship were shot on soundstages in the Greater Los Angeles Area. The soundtrack featured mostly reggae music. Mark Mancina returned to compose the film score, released as an album 13 years after the film's release.

Released by 20th Century Fox on June 13, 1997, the film received largely negative reviews from critics, who criticized the story, characters, absence of Reeves, and its setting on a slow-moving cruise ship. Critic Roger Ebert defended the film, calling it a "truly rousing ocean liner adventure story". The film was also a box-office bomb, earning $164.5 million worldwide against a production budget as high as $160 million. It was nominated for eight Golden Raspberry Awards, winning the Worst Remake or Sequel category.

== Plot ==
Los Angeles Police Department (LAPD) cop Alex Shaw is on a motorcycle chasing a vehicle with stolen goods. After he catches the driver of the vehicle, his girlfriend Annie Porter encounters him during her driving test. She discovers that Alex is on the SWAT team and concludes that he mistakenly told her that he was on beach patrol. As an apology, Alex surprises her with a Caribbean cruise on Seabourn Legend.

Aboard the ship, deranged passenger John Geiger, a former employee of the cruise company, hacks into the ship's computer system, sabotages the communication systems, and kills Captain Pollard. After blowing up two of the ship's engines, Geiger calls the bridge to notify the first officer, Juliano, of Pollard's death and order him to evacuate the ship. While passengers evacuate, Drew, a young girl who is deaf, becomes trapped in an elevator, and a group of people also become trapped behind locked fire doors in a hallway filling with smoke. As Annie and Alex attempt to board the last lifeboat, Geiger programs the ship to continue sailing. When the winch lowering the lifeboat jams, Alex jumps back onboard to rescue the passengers from falling overboard, while Annie and Juliano utilize the ship's gangplank to get them back on deck.

Realizing that Geiger has hijacked the ship, Alex accompanies Juliano to the cabin, but Geiger remotely detonates explosives inside the room. Annie and Dante, the ship's photographer, notice the people trapped behind the fire doors, so Annie rescues them by using a chainsaw to cut and breach the door open. Meanwhile, Alex orders the navigator, Merced, to flood the ship's decks and decelerate it by opening the ballast doors. As the ship floods, Alex notices Drew on a monitor after she climbs out of the elevator and enters the ballast room to rescue her. Noticing Geiger fleeing from the vault, Alex ambushes him, but Geiger escapes by shutting the fire door in front of him. Using the ship's intercom, Geiger explains that he designed the ship's autopilot system and is pursuing his revenge plot against the cruise line after being dismissed when he contracted copper poisoning. He escapes from Alex by attaching a grenade to a door.

As the crew notices that Geiger has programmed the ship to crash into an oil tanker off the coast of Saint Martin, Alex decides to prevent the crash by diving underneath the ship and jamming the propeller with a steel cable. Geiger jams the cable winch while Alex is underwater, causing it to break off the ship and free the cable. He then abducts Annie and absconds with her on a lifeboat.

To avert a collision, Alex and Dante venture into the ship's bilge pump room and maneuver the bow thrusters, steering it away from the oil tanker. The ship screeches down the side of the tanker and heads into a marina before crashing into a Saint Martin town and grinding to a halt. Alex hijacks a speed boat to pursue Annie, whom Geiger has dragged onto a seaplane; he employs a harpoon gun to tether himself to the plane from the boat and reels himself in through the water. Eventually, he climbs onto the plane and retrieves Annie, and both escape on one of the plane's floats, which lands on the ocean surface. Geiger attempts to escape over the oil tanker but loses control of the plane, which becomes impaled on the tanker's foremast; in the ensuing explosion, both vehicles are destroyed and Geiger perishes. The members of the tanker crew, however, launched their lifeboat just prior to the destruction. As the couple return to shore in the speed boat, Alex gives Annie an engagement ring, proposing marriage, and she happily accepts.

== Cast ==
- Sandra Bullock as Annie Porter
- Jason Patric as LAPD Officer Alex Shaw
- Willem Dafoe as John Geiger
- Temuera Morrison as Juliano
- Brian McCardie as Merced
- Jeremy Hotz as Ashton
- Bo Svenson as Captain Pollard
- Royale Watkins as Dante
- Tamia Hill as Sheri Silver
- Kimmy Robertson as Liza
- Christine Firkins as Drew
- Lois Chiles as Celeste
- Francis Guinan as Rupert
- Michael G. Hagerty as Harvey
- Colleen Camp as Debbie
- Joe Morton (uncredited cameo) as LAPD Lieutenant Herb 'Mac' McMahon
- Tim Conway as Mr. Kenter
- Glenn Plummer as Maurice
- Patrika Darbo as Ruby Fisher

== Production ==
=== Background ===
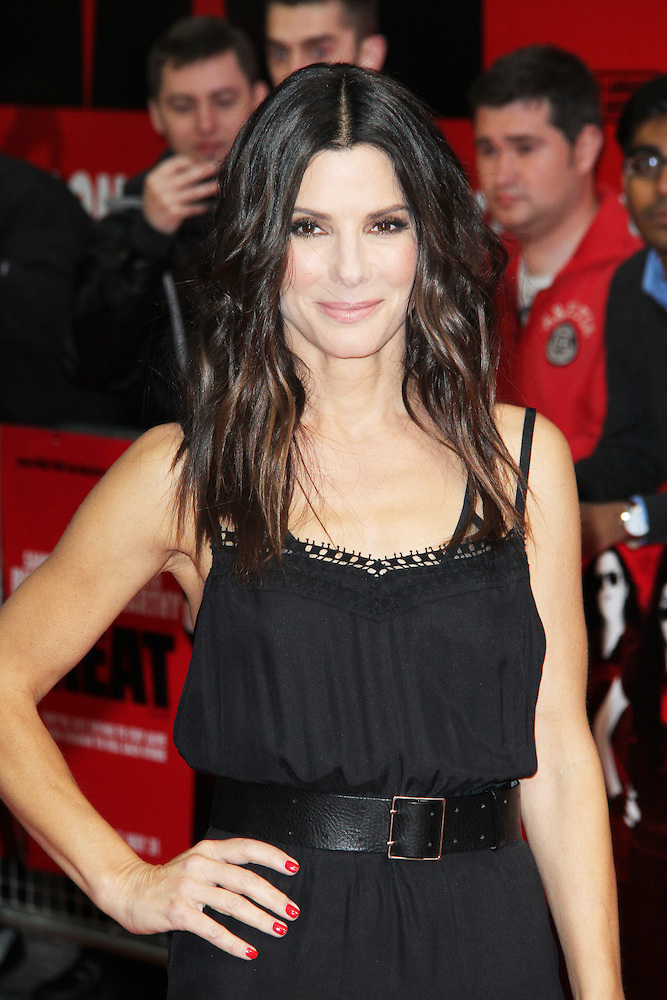
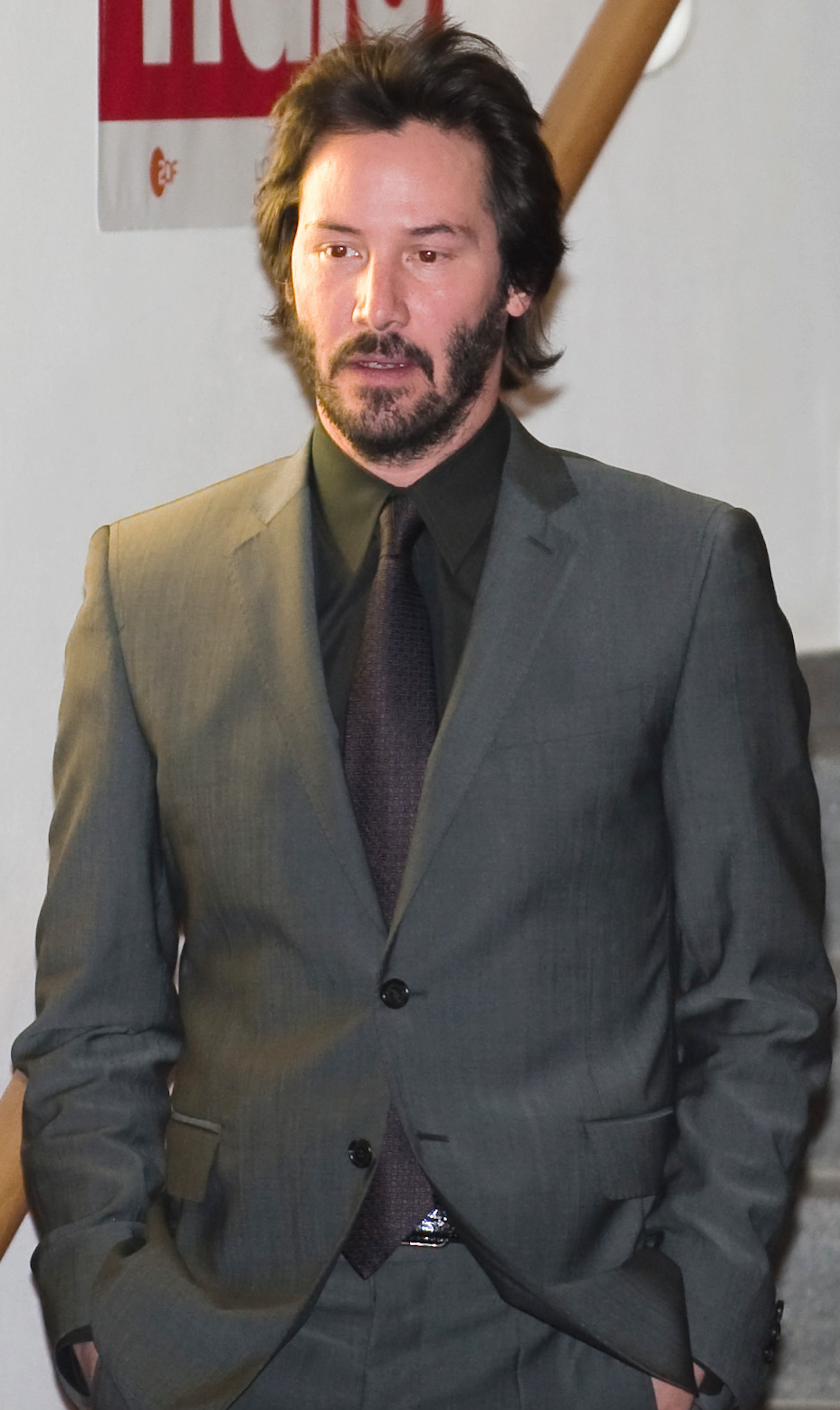
Speed starred Sandra Bullock and Keanu Reeves, both of whom were expected by the studio to reprise their roles in Speed 2. However, Reeves eventually declined to appear in the film.

Speed was released in June 1994, starring Keanu Reeves and Sandra Bullock. The film's plot features the story of a runaway bus armed with a bomb that will explode if its speed drops below 50 miles per hour (80 km/h). It was a critical and commercial success, and was the 8th-highest-grossing-film worldwide in 1994.

Due to positive word of mouth, studio 20th Century Fox began discussing plans for a Speed sequel a month prior to its release, and officially announced a sequel would be produced following the film's box office success after its first week in theaters. Although Speed director Jan de Bont felt the film was a "one-time story" with no sequel potential, he was contractually obligated to direct a sequel, and would be paid a reported $5–6 million salary. Reeves and Bullock had no contractual obligation to star in the sequel; however, by late 1994, Fox executive Tom Sherak had begun negotiations with the actors and hoped to produce a follow-up film with their two characters as a married couple.

=== Writing ===
Hundreds of ideas for a sequel were submitted to De Bont, all of which he turned down in favor of his own idea, based on a recurring nightmare he experienced about a cruise ship crashing into an island. Randall McCormick was hired to write the sequel in 1994 and received a story-writing credit along with De Bont. The screenplay was credited to McCormick and Jeff Nathanson, who began writing the film with its ending based on De Bont's nightmare.

Director John McTiernan of the Die Hard series claimed in 2001 that "the studio used most of the material we'd developed" for a potential Die Hard sequel and turned it into Speed 2, including "the ocean liner going on the beach." The third film in the series, Die Hard with a Vengeance (1995), was originally based on a spec script from 1990 titled Troubleshooter, whose premise involved fighting terrorists aboard a cruise ship. This concept for a sequel was later abandoned by the filmmakers due to its similarities to the film Under Siege (1992).

Speed writer Graham Yost and producer Mark Gordon claimed that neither of them were asked to participate in the sequel, although both of their names are listed in the film credits; Yost was given a writing credit for the film's characters and Gordon was credited as executive producer. In an interview in 2010, Yost stated he had two ideas for a sequel: a Vietnam War-era military ship set to explode if its ammunition comes in contact with water, and an aircraft forced to fly at a low altitude over the Andes Mountains.

=== Casting ===
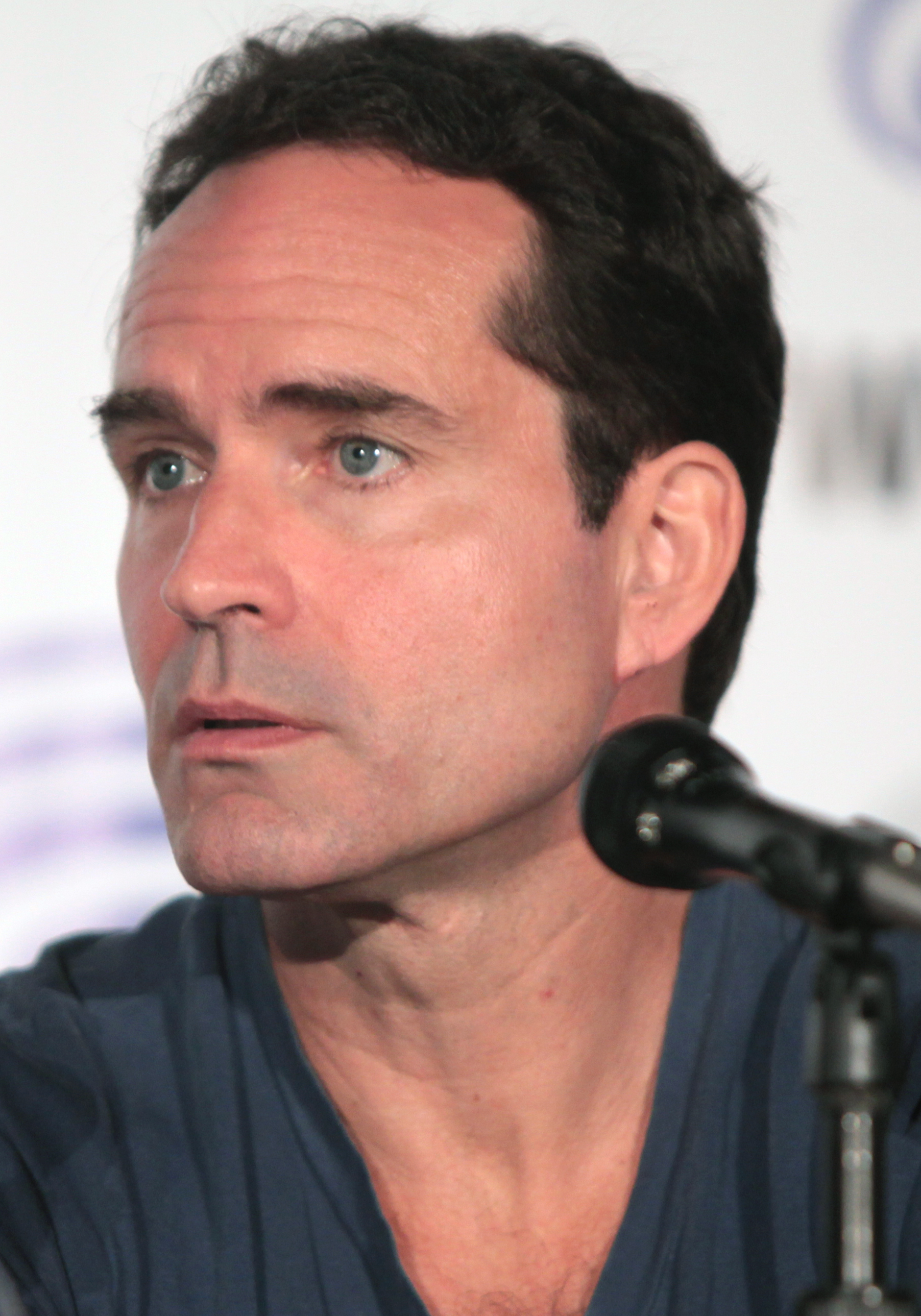
Jason Patric was cast in the lead role as Alex, replacing Reeves' role.

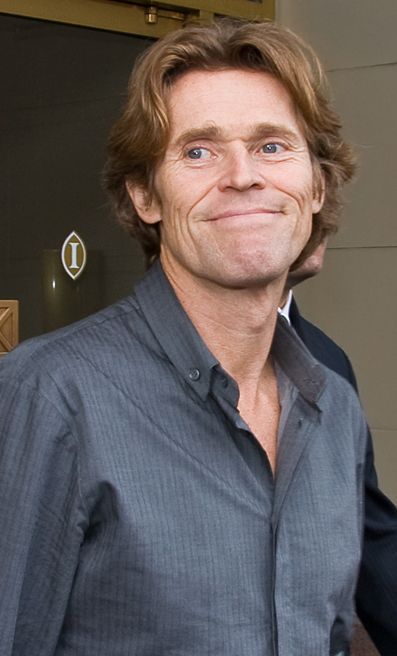
Willem Dafoe was cast as the film's villain, Geiger.

Bullock initially declined to star in the sequel, but later agreed in order to secure financial backing for the drama film Hope Floats (1998); she was paid a reported $11–$13 million to reprise her role as Annie. Reeves was offered $12 million to reprise his role as Jack Traven, but turned it down because he did not like the script, was financially secure from the success of Speed, and felt he was not "ready to mentally and physically" star in another action film after having completed Chain Reaction (1996). He passed on Speed 2 in order to star in the film The Devil's Advocate (1997), which was filmed at the same time, then subsequently toured with his band, Dogstar. Reeves said that Fox was "furious" with his decision and released "propaganda" against him, falsely claiming that he turned the role down to tour with his band. De Bont said that the character in the sequel was not specific to Reeves and could be played by any young actor, as long as he had chemistry with Bullock.

Many actors were considered to replace Reeves including: Simon Baker, Jon Bon Jovi, Julian McMahon, Patrick Muldoon, Johnathon Schaech, Christian Slater, William Zabka and Billy Zane. Bullock initially suggested Matthew McConaughey, who passed on the role, prompting her to suggest Jason Patric, with whom she had wanted to work since seeing his performance in After Dark, My Sweet (1990). De Bont was skeptical of featuring a relatively unknown actor such as Patric, but was reminded by the studio that Bullock and Reeves were also relatively unknown prior to Speed, and chose Patric based on his role in Sleepers (1996). Patric was paid a reported $4.5–$8 million for his role in Speed 2 and used his salary to finance a 1998 drama, Your Friends & Neighbors. After accepting the role, Patric stated that he never saw Speed or had any intentions of seeing it; Reeves said he was looking forward to seeing Patric star in the sequel. After Reeves declined to appear in Speed 2, the screenplay was rewritten to remove his character from the story, which De Bont wanted to deal with early in the film. His absence is explained in the first scene, in which Annie talks about how her relationship with Jack did not work out, and mentions her current relationship with Alex (Patric), before his character is introduced in the film.

Gary Oldman turned down the role of the villain, Geiger, to star as another villain in Air Force One (1997). Willem Dafoe was cast as Geiger after he wanted to star in a "big movie" and once again play a villain. De Bont cast New Zealand actor Temuera Morrison as Juliano based on his role in Once Were Warriors (1994). Although he did not like the script, Brian McCardie accepted the role as Merced as his agents assured him it would be good for his career.

Comedian Royale Watkins was hired by De Bont for the part of Dante after discovering Watkins performing at a comedy club. Glenn Plummer was cast as a character named Maurice whose boat is hijacked by Alex, reprising his role from Speed as a Jaguar owner whose car is hijacked by Jack. To add comic relief, De Bont cast comedian Tim Conway as Annie's driving instructor, and hoped it would be a comeback role for him. Singer Tamia was cast as Sheri, an entertainer on the ship, because De Bont wanted a singer who could also act. She did not plan on doing any film acting that early in her career, as she had yet to release her debut album, but said the part was "too perfect for [her] to resist." Joe Morton reprised his role from Speed as SWAT lieutenant Herb "Mac" McMahon in an uncredited cameo appearance in the beginning of the film.

=== Filming ===
Speed 2 was produced by De Bont's production company, Blue Tulip, which was one of the film's three co-producers along with Steve Perry and Michael Peyser. The director began working on pre-production prior to the release of his previous film, Twister (1996). For the cruise ship on which the film would be set, De Bont visited ships from various cruise lines and chose Seabourn Legend for its luxurious amenities and sleek design. While Speed was produced for $30 million, the sequel was green-lit at "just under $100 million" due to the larger production and higher cast salaries. He started location scouting in the Caribbean in May 1996, and chose Saint Martin as the primary filming location because he felt it was least likely to be subjected to a hurricane. Prior to production, details about the film were kept secret, and De Bont refused to confirm rumors about the film taking place on a ship, although he did state that the sequel would be "funnier", while Speed 2 star Jason Patric said the sequel is a "very complex movie" and would have "bigger sequences." It was later reported that the film had gone over-budget and costs had ballooned to as much as $160 million. De Bont acknowledged that they had gone over budget but that the cost would be close to $100 million.

Principal photography took place from September 1996, to late February 1997. Film crews moved to West Palm Beach and Miami, Florida in July 1996 anticipating shooting in each location for several weeks later that year. However, due to scheduling issues with Patric, production did not take place in West Palm Beach and there were "just a few days" filming in Miami. The Miami production took place in a gymnasium and boat hangar at the Dinner Key marina complex, rented by Fox. After spending over $55,000 on repairs to the facilities, Fox refused to pay the $35,000 in rental fees to the City of Miami. The city sued for the rent since Fox did not seek approval for the repairs, and a compromise was reached when the city credited some repair costs, resulting in Fox paying around $26,000 rent.

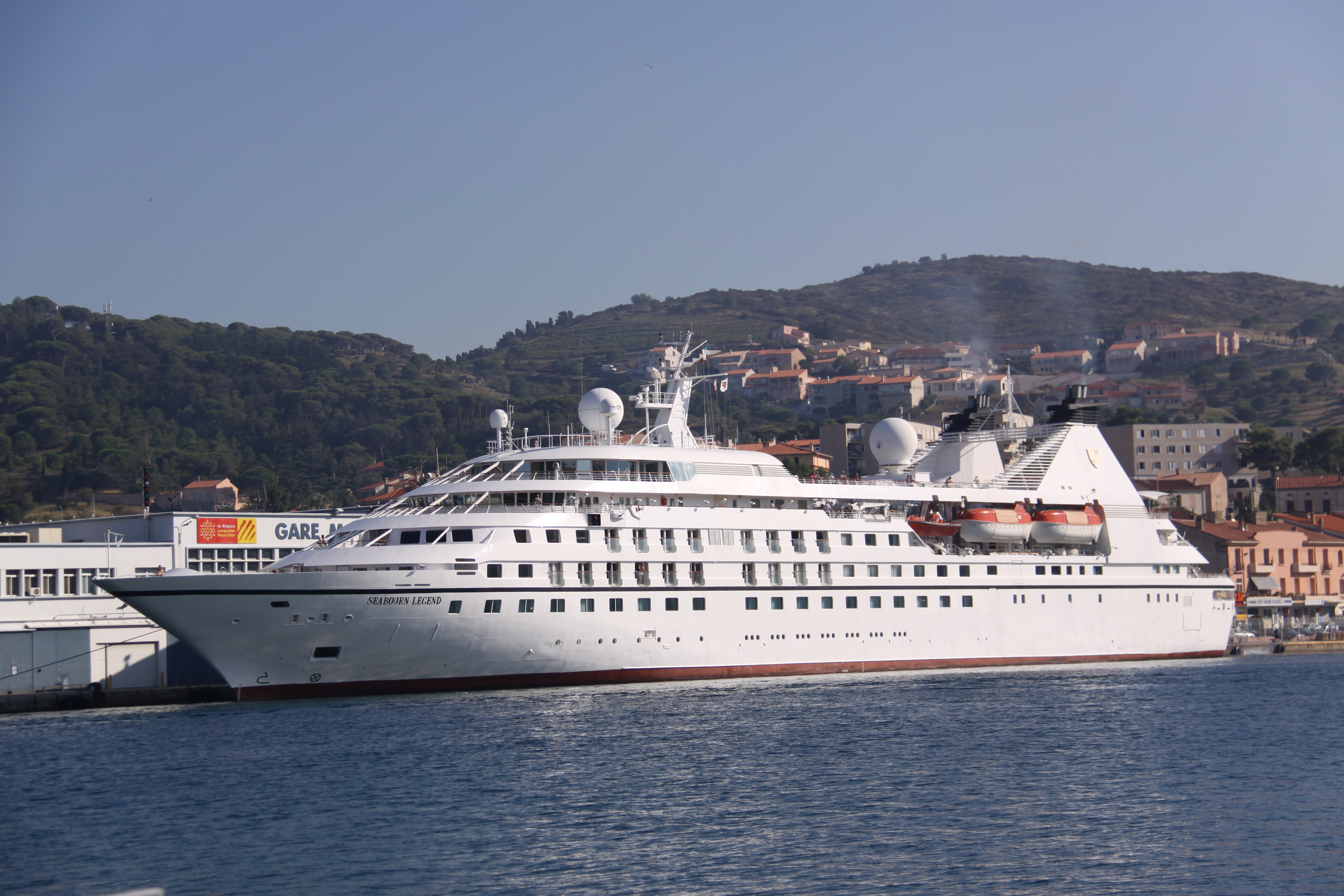
Speed 2 is set aboard Seabourn Legend, which was used for six weeks of filming during production.

Seabourn Legend was rented for six weeks at a reported cost of $38,000 per day; the ship served as the film's primary setting and provided accommodation for the cast and crew. The evacuation sequence was among the first scenes filmed on the ship, and was shot in Key West, Florida over a two-week period. Approximately 30 hoses and the ship's fire sprinkler system were used to simulate heavy rainfall in the scene. Severe weather conditions from Hurricane Lili delayed production activity on the ship for several days, and caused seasickness among the cast and crew for the remainder of the production at sea. To make the ship appear faster, all exterior shots were filmed from a moving vehicle. Scenes on the bridge were filmed in a mockup dubbed the "bridge ship", a large-scale reconstruction of the bow and bridge built atop the hull of a cargo ship. Additional ship interiors were filmed at Sony Pictures Studios and Warren Entertainment in Los Angeles County, California. Full-scale replicas of the ship's atrium, cabins, and engine rooms were constructed on sound stages where production took place for over a month. The scene where Alex rescues Drew while the ship is being flooded was filmed by camera operators wearing wet suits inside a sound stage tank, which was constructed with plywood and a hydraulic lift to give the effect that the water level was rising.

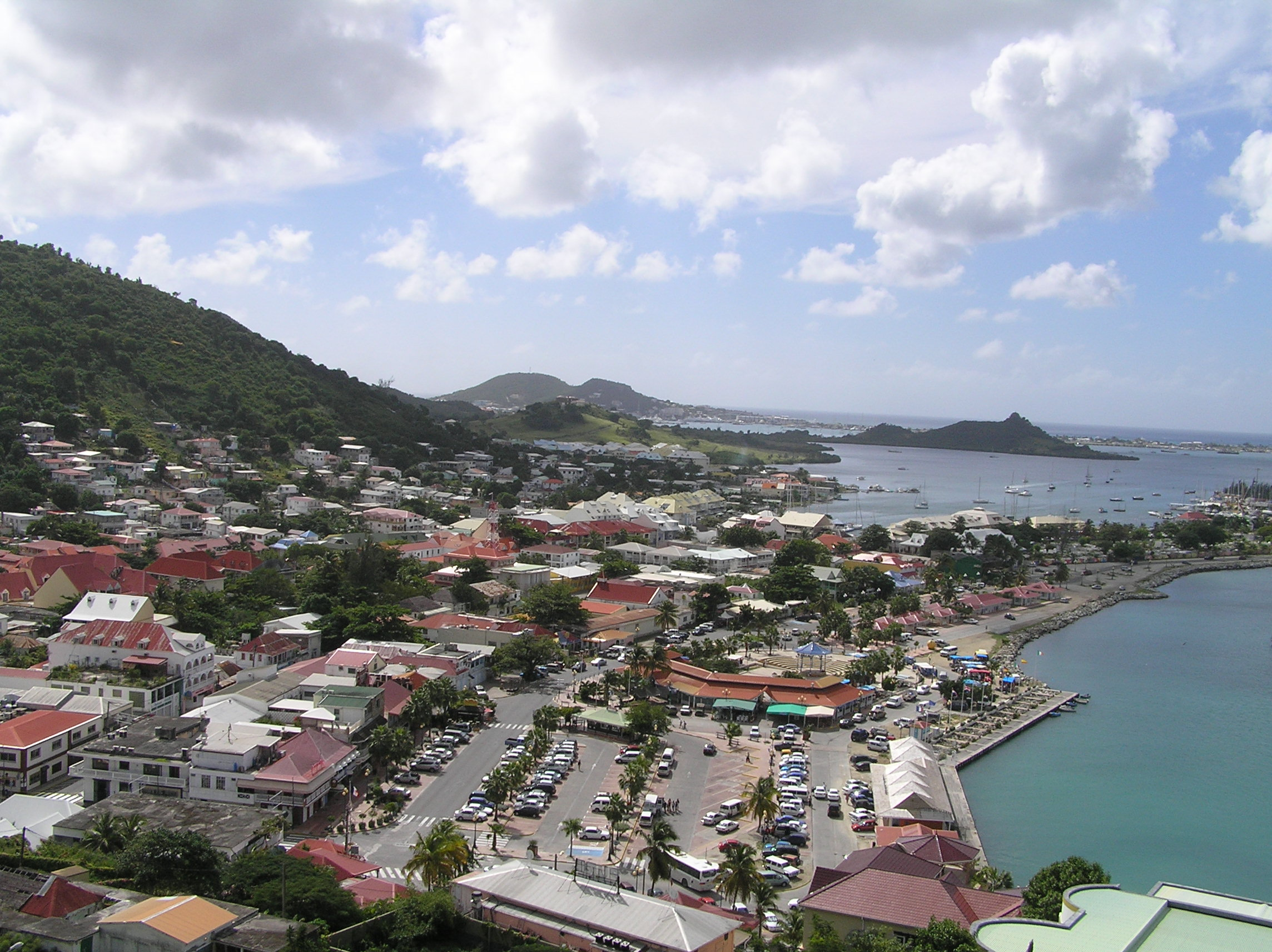
The finale scene was filmed in the town of Marigot, Saint Martin.

A full-scale mock-up of the ship's bow, known as the "rail ship," was placed atop a rail and propelled into the set constructed in Marigot. The rest of the ship was added through computer-generated special effects during post-production.

For the climactic scene when the ship crashes into an island, De Bont wanted to create and destroy an actual town. He opted against miniature scale models or computer-generated imagery (CGI) to provide a sense of realism for the actors and the audience. A $5 million, 35-building set was constructed in Marigot, Saint Martin based on the town's local architecture, which temporarily housed production offices. Despite De Bont's reason for choosing Saint Martin for filming, a hurricane struck the town and destroyed the set during construction. It had to be rebuilt with hurricane-proof buildings. Exteriors of the bow mockup on the bridge ship were used in the first part of the scene when the Seabourn Legend is crashing into sailboats in the harbor; the bridge ship was used in place of the actual Seabourn Legend, as the latter could not navigate the harbor's shallow waters. The captain of the bridge ship had great difficulty hitting the sailboats during filming, despite cameras placed on the boats for the captain to view. A second mockup was constructed for the latter part of the scene, which featured a 150-foot-long (46 m) replica of the Seabourn Legend's bow. This mockup, referred to as the "rail ship", weighed 300 short tons (270 t), and sat atop a set of wheels along a 1,000-foot-long (300 m) track built 60 feet (18 m) underwater.

Filming the final scene with the rail ship was initially delayed because it could not be hoisted onto the track because of large waves caused by the hurricane. The scene was filmed using 14 cameras, with the rail ship traveling 50 feet (15 m) at a time into the set, with debris from the destruction cleared between each take. The mockup was powered by four diesel engines and pulled by a large chain at a speed of 18 miles per hour (29 km/h). The scene's three planned collisions were aided by explosives and hydraulics to ensure the set's structures collapsed precisely. Concrete was also removed from the buildings and replaced with sand-coated balsa wood so the buildings would "crumble" more effectively after being hit by the rail ship. In the scene's final shot, it had to stop successfully within a 6-inch (15 cm) area on the first take. The five-minute scene cost $25 million to produce, roughly one quarter of the film's entire budget, and set records as both the largest and the most expensive stunt ever filmed.

The underwater scene where Alex swims underneath the ship was filmed in the Tongue of the Ocean off the coast of New Providence in the Bahamas. The location was chosen due to its water clarity, however, after viewing dailies of the scene, De Bont felt the water was too clear, so it was reshot with divers above the camera dusting the area in front of the lens with sediment to alter the clarity of the footage. The scene was filmed underneath a propeller-less barge that was designed to resemble the Seabourn Legend. To provide a sense of velocity in the scene, the barge was towed by tugboats at one and a half knots. The production crew did not have a winch system available for the underwater shoot as depicted in the scene, so a pulley system was created by feeding Patric a rope that was attached to the axle of a car that drove along the barge.

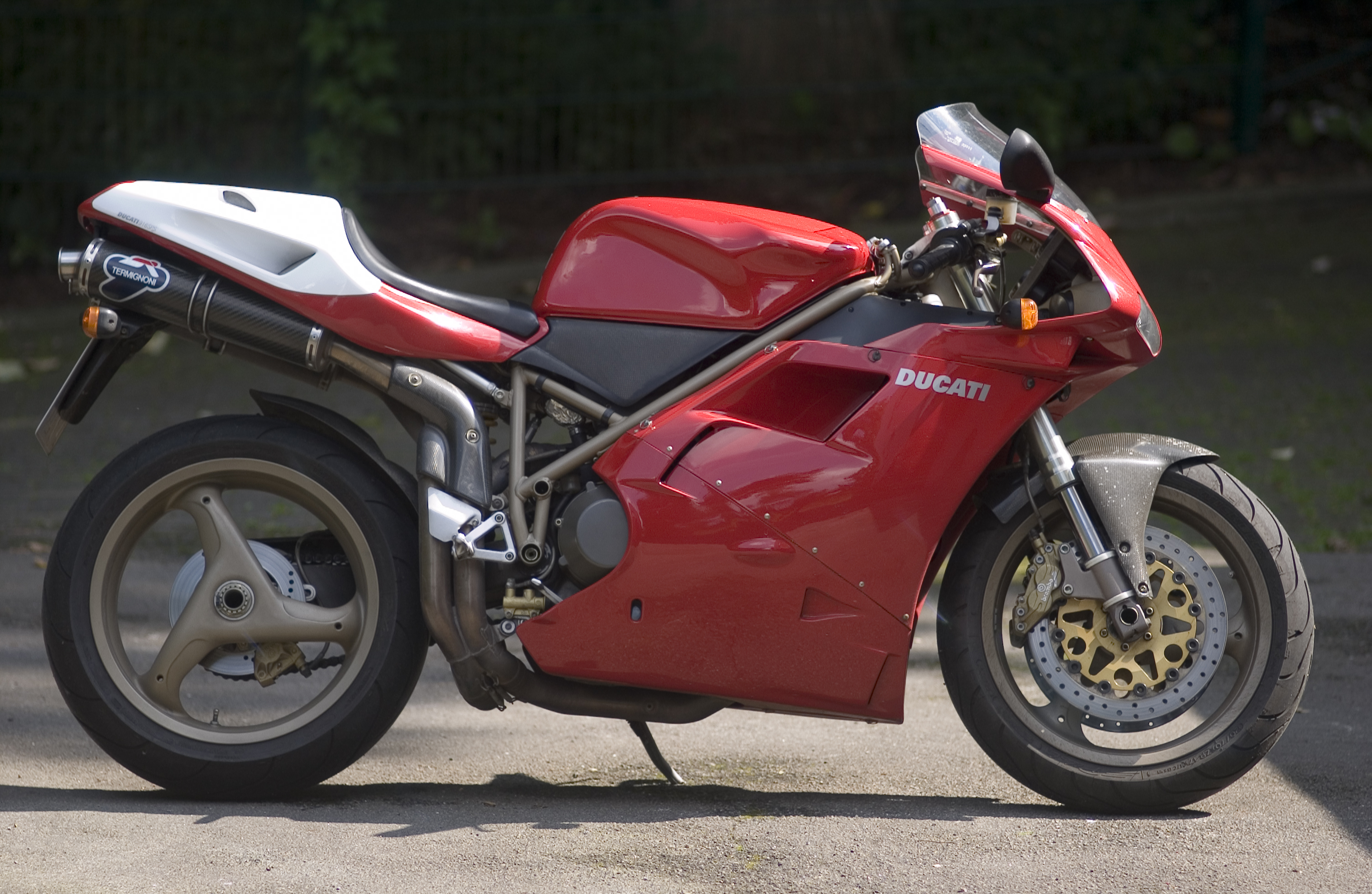
Patric rode a Ducati 916 in the film's opening chase scene, and almost died while performing a stunt on the motorcycle during filming.

Instead of using stunt doubles, De Bont persuaded Bullock, Patric, and Dafoe to perform their own stunts, so the scenes would appear more realistic; the lead actors were required to engage in physical exercise sessions before and during filming. Stunt coordinator Dick Ziker was very impressed with Patric's stuntwork, and said that he "is so physical he probably could be one of the top stunt men in the world." His stunts included being dragged by a seaplane through the water, jumping onto collapsing buildings, and scuba diving while pulled by a moving ship. He was also required to tread water for multiple hours at a time. During a motorcycle stunt on a Ducati 916 on the second day of filming, Patric flew off the bike 30 feet (9 m) into the air and landed on a small bush; Bullock said the incident was so serious that Patric "should be dead." After surviving a traumatic surfing incident as a teenager, Bullock had to overcome her fear of water to perform necessary stuntwork in the film. During production at sea, Bullock was smacked into the ship on multiple occasions, and was saved by Patric from dangerous situation by the ship's rudder in one scene. Bullock and Patric also had a scene filmed in an underwater tank where they had to kiss underwater with Bullock's hands tied together. Navy SEALs with scuba gear were present inside the tank during shooting, as the actors had to hold their breath during the scene. According to Bullock, she performed all of her own stuntwork "except for a quarter of one stunt"; her stunt double worked for only three days during production. Of all the stunt-related incidents during production, De Bont said the most frightening was when a stunt woman was hit in the face by a boat cable and required reconstructive surgery. Following the production at sea, De Bont said that filming on water "was 100 percent more difficult than [he] imagined."

=== Music ===
==== Score ====
Composer Mark Mancina wrote the film score for Speed 2 having previously composed the scores for Speed and Twister. He started composing the music in March 1997 and it was recorded at the end of April. He began by creating themes and melodies, then worked them into the film where he felt they would fit. The score includes a reworking of the 20th Century Fox fanfare, in which the final chord is sustained and "slithers down" into the opening theme, while the studio logo fades into a traveling shot of the ocean on screen. Fox was initially hesitant to feature an altered version of their fanfare, but allowed the alteration after being convinced by De Bont and hearing it performed by an orchestra.

"Cruising" – excerpt from Speed 2 score
The film score features reggae music to serve as a love theme and complement the film's Caribbean vacation setting. The eight steel drummers heard in the music were double-tracked to increase the sound of the percussion.

Specific action cues were scored on the piano down to each second of film. Noting how the film was set in the Caribbean and had a different, slower pace than Speed, Mancina gave the score a "Jamaican/Latin feel" by incorporating reggae music between action sequences. The reggae music was written to give the feel of being on vacation and serve as a love theme for the characters. Some themes from Speed were included in the score between sections of the newly written material. He wrote new themes for Annie and Alex because he felt the original themes written for Reeves' character would not work well with Patric. After viewing the scene where Geiger attaches leeches to his body to cleanse his blood, Mancina felt the scene was "so gross" that he wrote a "slimy theme" for the character, which is distinctively different from the rest of the music. He mixed the score at the same time the film was being edited, which meant the music had to be constantly re-edited into the film. During the scoring of Speed 2, Mancina said in an interview that keeping up with the editing of the film was the "hardest thing [he had] ever done."

Over 100 minutes of score are present in Speed 2, more than Mancina wrote for Speed and Twister combined. After the score was written, he created a demo of the entire score on a synthesizer to play for De Bont. While the score for Speed only used strings, French horns, and percussion, Speed 2 used a wider variety of instruments including trombones, large woodwinds, bass clarinets, and contrabassoons. The score was recorded by a 96-person orchestra, including Mancina, who performed on a classical guitar on several cues. The reggae music featured a band with steel drums, in addition to Cuban drums and Latin percussion. De Bont wanted 16 steel drum players, but due to a lack of available players, Mancina used eight drums which were double-tracked.

Mancina's score was not initially released on CD to avoid competition with sales of the soundtrack album. De Bont made a deal with Virgin Records that it could not be released until at least six months after the release of the soundtrack. The score was not officially released until June 2010, when it was sold by La-La Land Records as a 3000-unit limited edition album. The album features 70 minutes of music across 14 tracks and, according to La-La Land, it also features a "notable amount of music" that was not used in the film, due to the constant re-edits prior to its release date. Daniel Schweiger of Film Music Magazine said that Mancina's score was "arguably a better one than Speed", praising the album's "thrilling themes", "epic orchestrations", and "Jamaican-style grooves." Filmtracks.com gave the release four out of five stars, saying the album was "perhaps [La-La Land's] finest offering of a previously unreleased score", although it also stated that "some of the action and suspense material in the latter half of the score becomes a bit generic."

==== Soundtrack ====
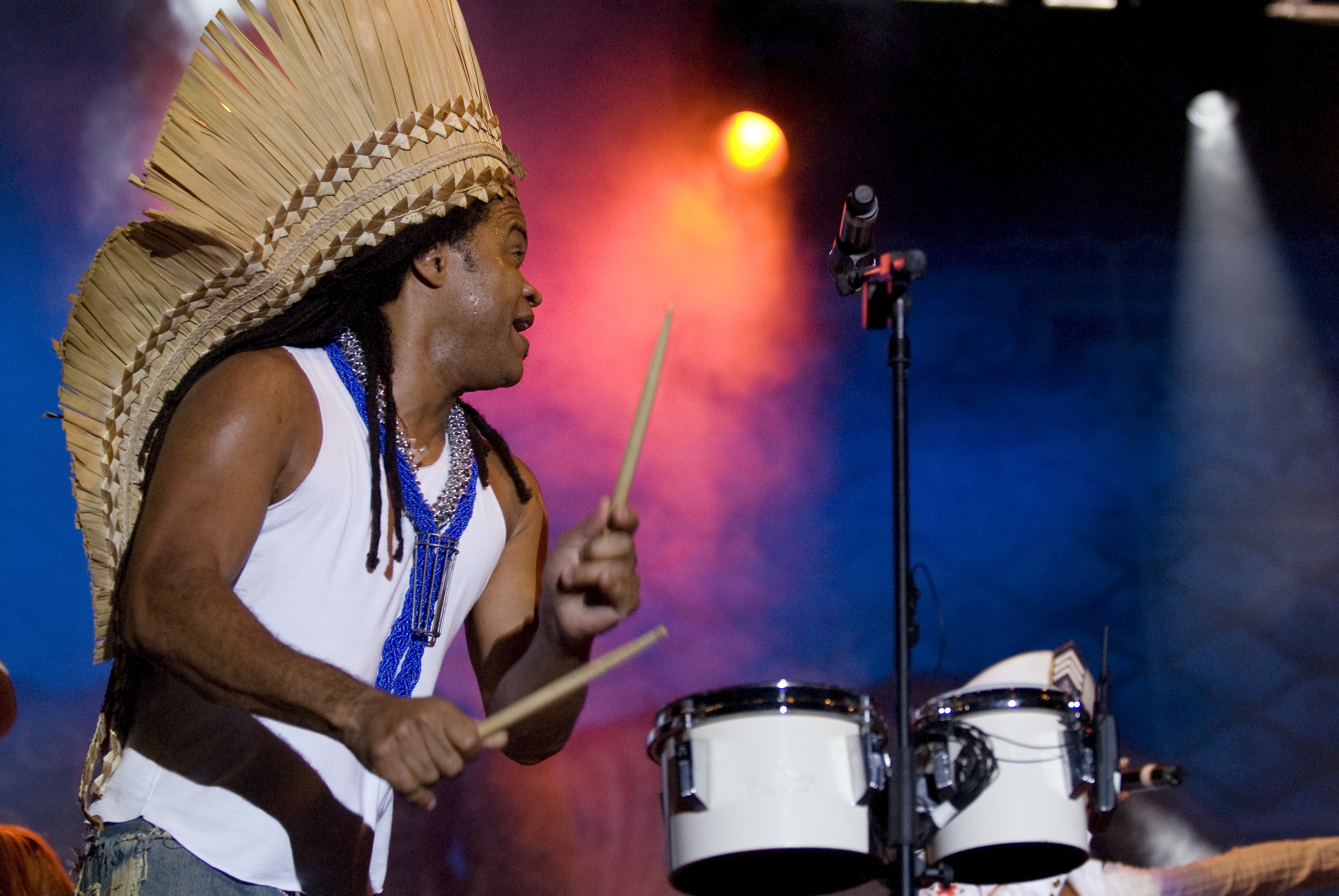
Brazilian reggae musician Carlinhos Brown was selected to appear in the film and on the soundtrack for his lively, energetic music.

To complement the film's Caribbean setting, the soundtrack consists of mostly reggae music. De Bont wanted musicians to appear in the film as entertainers on the cruise ship. A cameo appearance for reggae band UB40 was written into the script after the filmmakers heard a demo of their song "Tell Me Is It True", and wanted them to perform it in the film. Brazilian reggae musician Carlinhos Brown was also chosen to be featured as a performer on the ship because De Bont wanted music that was "lively" and felt that Brown's music was "full of energy." Tamia worked with De Bont and producer Quincy Jones to choose a song for her character to perform in the film, and selected "Make Tonight Beautiful", which was written by Diane Warren.

In addition to UB40 and Brown, the soundtrack features reggae music from: Jimmy Cliff, Common Sense, Maxi Priest, Shaggy, Rayvon, and Betty Wright. Mark Mancina wrote a techno track for the soundtrack based on his film score, titled "Speed TK Re-mix", performed by Japanese musician Tetsuya "TK" Komuro. Other songs recorded specifically for the soundtrack include Priest's cover of "The Tide Is High" and Cliff's re-recording of his 1972 song "You Can Get It If You Really Want". The Speed 2: Cruise Control soundtrack album was released by Virgin Records on May 20, 1997, about one month before the film's release. The album features 12 songs, all of which are featured in the film; five of them were released as singles.

== Reception ==
=== Critical response ===
Worst sequel list rankings
List	Rank
Complex	1st
Far Out	2nd
Total Film	5th
Entertainment Weekly	9th
Moviefone	9th
The Independent	Top 10
MSN	Top 10
Salon	Top 10
Virgin Media	Top 10
Toronto Sun	Top 25
Comcast	42nd

Speed 2: Cruise Control was widely lambasted by critics, faring much worse than its predecessor. On Rotten Tomatoes, the film has an approval rating of 4% based on reviews from 76 critics, with an average rating of 3.4/10. The website's consensus reads: "Speed 2 falls far short of its predecessor, thanks to laughable dialogue, thin characterization, unsurprisingly familiar plot devices, and action sequences that fail to generate any excitement." On Metacritic, the film has a weighted average score of 24 out of 100, based on 22 critics, indicating "generally unfavorable reviews". Audiences surveyed by CinemaScore gave the film a grade "B−" on scale of A to F.

Time magazine stated that Patric's character was "fundamentally uninteresting", but blamed De Bont and the screenwriters for "not providing their actors with stuff to act." Many critics stated that a major issue with the film was the lack of thrills due to the setting on the slow-moving ship. Entertainment Weekly heavily criticized the lack of story and said the film is "as slow-moving as a garbage scow." According to the Los Angeles Times, even children who saw the film felt it was strange that it took place on a ship "not capable of going more than a few knots per hour [sic]", and claimed that Speed was "much more logical." Kenneth Turan of the Los Angeles Times stated, "Even the film's big-ticket closing stunts are more impressive for their size than for any excitement they generate."

It is also considered to be one of the worst film sequels of all time, and many publications have placed Speed 2 on their lists of the worst film sequels. Complex ranked the film first on a list of The 50 Worst Sequels of All Time, calling it "one of the worst 'event' movies ever conceived", while praising Reeves' choice not to return for the sequel, and referring to Patric as "wooden and woefully miscast." In 2010, New York film critic David Edelstein featured an article on Speed 2 that described it as the "Worst Sequel of All", mainly due to the film's explanation for the absence of Reeves' character. In addition to being ranked among the worst sequels, Empire ranked the film at number 24 on its list of The 50 Worst Movies Ever.

Bullock later regretted starring in the film, and stated that the script was to blame for the film's negative reception. She admitted to having been skeptical about its success during production and "knew it was going to be a big flop" once she saw the final product. Patric also admitted "it wasn't a good movie" and said that its lack of success was due to de Bont's direction, while praising Bullock and the rest of the film's crew. Mark Gordon and Graham Yost stated they felt "bitter and happy" after initially not being asked to be involved in Speed 2, then seeing that the film was unsuccessful.

The film did receive some positive feedback. Roger Ebert of the Chicago Sun Times and Gene Siskel of the Chicago Tribune both gave Speed 2 three out of four stars, two of the film's three positive reviews included on Rotten Tomatoes. On their film review TV series Siskel & Ebert, they collectively gave Speed 2 a positive rating of "Two Thumbs Up", calling it a "truly rousing ocean liner adventure story", although Ebert criticized Bullock's more limited role in the sequel while Patric "stole all the action sequences." Since his original review, Ebert claimed that he enjoyed Speed 2 more than Bullock, and wrote an article in 2013 that his favorable review of the film "inspired more disbelief" than any other he had written and was frequently cited as an example of him being a poor film critic. At the Conference on World Affairs in 1999, Ebert spoke about the difficulty of making films such as Speed 2 and defended his review by offering a "Speed 3" contest for anyone to create a five-minute short film that takes place on something that cannot stop moving.

Speed 2 was listed on About.com's Top 9 Cruise Ship or Ocean Liner Movies, and said it had "good shots of the ship and a spectacular ending", but also described the plot as "lame." The Atlanta Journal-Constitution, Los Angeles Daily News, and The Sacramento Bee each gave favorable reviews, while stating that the film was not as good as Speed. Empire's Andrew Collins gave the film 3 out of 5 stars, while commenting "...top-billed Sandra Bullock, formerly an accidental heroine, is insultingly sidelined here to boyfriend's little helper and hostage-in-waiting. Patric is the film's actual seaborne legend, and a watchable one, but the pair's gooey relationship sorely lacks Speed's thrown-together dynamic."

=== Box office ===
Speed 2: Cruise Control premiered at the Cineplex Odeon in Century City, Los Angeles on June 9, 1997, and was released into theaters on June 13. The release date was rescheduled twice—originally set for July 2 and pushed up to June 6 to avoid competition with Men in Black and Titanic (which was then scheduled for July), then moved back one week to avoid competition with Con Air.

During its opening weekend, Speed 2 was shown on 2,615 screens and grossed $16.2 million. It ranked at number one in the box office, grossing just $500,000 more than Con Air in second place. Box office sales for Speed 2 dropped 54% the following weekend, grossing only $7.8 million and ranking at number five behind Batman & Robin, My Best Friend's Wedding, Con Air and The Lost World: Jurassic Park. In its third weekend, it further fell into seventh place below the latter four films, Hercules and Face/Off, making $3.7 million.

The film grossed $48 million in the United States, and had a total gross of $164.5 million worldwide. Moviefone and Time have both ranked the film among the biggest box office bombs of all time, with estimated losses for the studio ranging from $40–70 million.

=== Awards ===
The film received eight Razzie Award nominations out of 12 possible categories at the 18th Golden Raspberry Awards, and had the second-highest number that year following Batman & Robin (1997), which had 11 nominations. Speed 2 won the award for "Worst Remake or Sequel", but lost the award for "Worst Picture" to The Postman (1997). At the Stinkers Bad Movie Awards, the film was nominated for three awards. It won Worst Sequel but lost both Worst Director and Worst Screenplay for a Film Grossing Over $100M to Batman & Robin.

Nominations and wins
Ceremony	Award	Nominee	Result
Razzies	Worst Picture	Jan de Bont, Steve Perry, Michael Peyser	Nominated
Razzies	Worst Actress	Sandra Bullock	Nominated
Razzies	Worst Supporting Actor	Willem Dafoe	Nominated
Razzies	Worst Screen Couple	Sandra Bullock, Jason Patric	Nominated
Razzies	Worst Remake or Sequel	Speed 2: Cruise Control	Won
Razzies	Worst Director	Jan de Bont	Nominated
Razzies	Worst Screenplay	Randall McCormick, Jeff Nathanson, Jan de Bont	Nominated
Razzies	Worst Song	"My Dream" (written by Orville Burrell, Robert Livingston, Dennis Haliburton)	Nominated
Stinkers	Worst Director	Jan de Bont	Nominated
Stinkers	Worst Screenplay for a Film Grossing Over $100M Worldwide Using Hollywood Math	20th Century Fox	Nominated
Stinkers	Worst Sequel	20th Century Fox	Won

== Home media and rights ==
20th Century Fox Home Entertainment released Speed 2: Cruise Control on VHS and LaserDisc in the United States on December 2, 1997. The film would be released for the first time on DVD on November 3, 1998. It was once again released on DVD on July 30, 2002, along with its predecessor. This THX certified DVD release features animated menus that resemble Geiger's computer. Bonus features include a half-hour HBO special called "The Making of Speed 2: Cruise Control" and three trailers. These are a single trailer for Speed and two others for its sequel. There is also a DTS 5.1 audio track on this release. In Australia (Region 4), it was released on DVD in 2001 by 20th Century Fox Home Entertainment South Pacific, while in the United Kingdom (Region 2) it was bundled together with Speed on a January 2004 DVD release. In 1998, the film also received LaserDisc releases in Japan and Hong Kong. On May 6, 2014, Speed 2: Cruise Control was released on Blu-ray as part of the Speed Collector Pack.

On March 20, 2019, Rupert Murdoch sold most of 21st Century Fox's film and television assets to The Walt Disney Company, and Speed 2: Cruise Control was one of the films included in the deal.

== Cancelled video game ==
A video game was being developed as an original IP titled Muzzle Velocity by developer Bits Studios featuring a story in which player character Jack, a member of the LAPD SWAT team during a mission in Los Angeles, is battling an out of control crime wave that the LAPD cannot stop it on its own. After the studio partnered with Fox Interactive, development of the game shifted to an alternate IP under the Speed series titled after and based on the film itself Speed 2: Cruise Control. The game would have been primarily set on a boat, though a bus level was also conceived as a nod to the original film. This game was then planned to release in January 1999 for Nintendo 64 and PC. However, the movie was both a critical and commercial failure upon its release and both companies decided to switch the project once more to the Die Hard franchise thus becoming Die Hard 64. After work for the previous title could not be finished sometime in 2000, it was moved to the GameCube and would later become Die Hard: Vendetta, which was released in 2002.

== Potential sequel ==
In September 2013, Keanu Reeves stated that he believed that an opportunity for his return in a sequel had passed. By September of the following year however, the actor stated that he would be open to reprising his lead role in a sequel. In May 2019, Reeves once again expressed his interest in a potential third movie. By November 2020, Jan de Bont stated that a third film may be developed, while acknowledging that he would want the original cast to return. In December 2021, Reeves expressed his desire to work again with Bullock in the future, and said "never say never" while acknowledging that the realization of a third installment may become a reality. By March 2022, Bullock expressed interest in reprising her role while joking about how much older they both are at this point in time. Later that month she stated that though she was taking a hiatus from acting, she would like to make a third Speed film alongside Reeves. During the interview, she and Daniel Radcliffe brainstormed comedic ideas for the potential project.

In March 2023, Reeves stated that he would reprise his role under the condition that the story justifies the movie with a great script. By April, Graham Yost expressed interest in returning to serve as screenwriter.
