= George Dickerson =

American actor (1933–2015)

- Born: George Graf Dickerson, Jr. July 25, 1933; Topeka, Kansas, US
- Died: January 10, 2015 (aged 81); New York City, New York, US
- Occupations: Actor; poet; writer
- Children: Dome Karukoski

George Graf Dickerson Jr. (July 25, 1933 – January 10, 2015) was an American actor, writer, and poet.

== Biography ==
Dickerson was born July 25, 1933, in Topeka, Kansas, to George Graf Dickerson, a lawyer, and Elizabeth Dickerson (née Naumann); he did not develop a good relationship with his parents. He had one brother, five years his junior. As a child, his family lived in Michigan, the South Side of Chicago, Queens, New York, and Virginia. From 1965 onwards he lived in the same apartment in Manhattan once rented by critic James Agee (with whom Dickerson claimed to have spiritual contact).

Dickerson served in the U.S. Army from December 1953 to the fall of 1954. He graduated from Yale University in 1955, after studying with novelist and poet Robert Penn Warren and Cleanth Brooks, advocates of New Criticism. After working a teaching job in Vermont, Dickerson read his poems at venues with Beatnik poets such as Gregory Corso, Diane di Prima, and Ted Joans. His poetry was praised by novelist Norman Mailer.

He maintained long term friendships with many well-known artists, including songwriter Leonard Cohen, actor Richard Widmark, playwright Arthur Miller, actor Roscoe Lee Browne, opera soprano Leontyne Price, Edna St. Vincent Millay’s sister, Norma Ellis, John Farrar, and ex-Poet Laureate Mark Strand.

In the 1970s, after a decade in the literary world, Dickerson worked as Press Secretary and speech writer for Connecticut Republican Congressman Robert H. Steele, and Head of Press and Publications for UNRWA (the United Nations Relief and Works Agency for Palestine Refugees in the Near East) at its headquarters in Beirut, Lebanon, where he experienced the Lebanese Civil War. In Beirut he had been taken hostage along with two other people who were later executed, with only Dickerson surviving. After his release, Dickerson was evacuated to Amman from where he would return to the United States.

Dickerson married four times and had five children: two daughters by his first wife, a son by his third wife, a daughter by his fourth wife, and a son born out of wedlock with a Finnish journalist. He was romantically involved with 1960s supermodel Veruschka.

Dickerson spoke five languages: English, French, German, Arabic, and Italian. While not religious, he claimed a belief in God. He suffered from Crohn's disease.

Dickerson was a Democrat, and only once voted Republican, for former New York City mayor John V. Lindsay. Of his politics, Dickerson said, 'I wasn’t involved in the Civil Rights movement. That is a failure on my part. I wasn’t really political until I started writing about world affairs for Time. I didn’t see my Black friends as black and they sensed that, so the subject didn’t come up between us, as hard as that may be to believe. We talked about what close friends talk about when there are no issues between them…struggles with their writing, with their wives…."

Dickerson died after a long illness in early 2015, surrounded by the people closest to him. His death was made public by his son Dome via Facebook on January 13, 2015.

== Writing ==
By 1960, Dickerson was working at the Macmillan Publishing Company. He then worked at Time magazine, The New Yorker, and Story magazine. While reviewing literature for Time, Dickerson helped to promote the careers of such young (at that time) writers as John Irving, Cormac McCarthy, Donald Barthelme, Robert Stone, and Don DeLillo.

Dickerson published several short stories and began an uncompleted novel about the fashion industry. His short story Chico appeared in The Best American Short Stories of 1963, and was praised by poet e.e. cummings. His short story A Mussel Named Ecclesiastes appeared in The Best American Short Stories of 1966. He was also published in The New Yorker, Mademoiselle, The Saturday Evening Post, Cosmopolitan, and Penthouse.

After his time in Lebanon, Dickerson suffered from post-traumatic stress disorder (PTSD) and suffered a decades-long bout of writer's block. By the mid-1990s, Dickerson began to write poetry again. A book of his, Selected Poems, was published in 2000, by Rattapallax publishing company and journal, which he helped to found. Dickerson stated that he wrote out of “love and compassion for the human condition. His poetry has been praised by critics such as Nicholas Birns who reviewed it for the Hollins Critic. Dickerson also wrote drama, including a one-man play, A Few Useless Mementos For Sale.

== Acting ==
Dickerson returned from Lebanon to the United States and became an actor, taking roles in the television series Hill Street Blues, as Police Commander Swanson, and Detective Williams in David Lynch's film Blue Velvet (1986). He also featured in the soap opera Search for Tomorrow, as well as local theater and independent films, such as Broken Giant, Ties to Rachel, and Stranger in the Kingdom. He had major roles in films like Psycho II (1983), Space Raiders (1983), The Star Chamber (1983), No Mercy (1986), Death Wish 4: The Crackdown (1987), After Dark, My Sweet (1990), and Death Warrant (1990). Dickerson also guest starred on episodes of shows like Three's Company, Charlie's Angels, Little House On The Prairie, L.A. Law, and Sledge Hammer!.

Dickerson was a member of SAG, AFTRA, Actors' Equity, the Dramatists' Guild, the Author's Guild, the Academy of American Poets, and AMPAS.

== Filmography ==
Year	Title	Role	Notes
1981	Cutter's Way	Mortician	
1982	National Lampoon's Movie Madness	More Lecherous Dairy President - 'Success Wanters'	
1982	Jinxed!	Tahoe Casino Manager	
1983	Psycho II	County Sheriff	
1983	Space Raiders	Tracton	
1983	The Star Chamber	George Tillis	
1986	Blue Velvet	Detective John Williams	
1986	No Mercy	Reblue	
1987	Death Wish 4: The Crackdown	Detective Sid Reiner	
1990	After Dark, My Sweet	Doc Goldman	
1990	Death Warrant	Tom Vogler	
1996	Vertical City		
1997	Ties to Rachel	Bucyrus	
1997	The Broken Giant	Thomas Smith	
1999	A Stranger in the Kingdom	Sheriff Mason White	(final film role)
