= Expired (2007 film) =

- Theatrical release poster
- Directed by: Cecilia Miniucchi
- Written by: Cecilia Miniucchi
- Produced by: Jeffrey Coulter; Fred Roos
- Starring: Samantha Morton; Jason Patric; Teri Garr; Illeana Douglas
- Cinematography: Zoran Popović
- Edited by: Fritz Feick; Anne Goursaud
- Music by: Jeffrey Coulter
- Distributed by: NonStop Entertainment (Sweden) (Theat.)
- Release dates: January 19, 2007 (Sundance Film Festival); June 20, 2008 (United States)
- Running time: 104 minutes
- Country: United States
- Language: English

Expired is a 2007 comedy-drama film and the directorial debut of writer-director Cecilia Miniucchi, whose previous credits include the documentary on the work of artist Hermann Nitsch, entitled Nitsch 1998. It stars Samantha Morton, Jason Patric, Illeana Douglas and Teri Garr.

The film was shown at several festivals over 2007 and 2008 but did not get a wide theatrical release in the US or Europe.

== Plot ==
Claire, a mild-mannered parking enforcement officer, lives in a small flat with her mother who is recovering from a recent stroke. In the opening sequence she patrols the Los Angeles streets and stumbles into an old flame, who introduces Claire to his wife and ill-behaved daughter. Reeling from the chance encounter, she steps out onto the street and is hit by a passing vehicle.

Returning to work three weeks later, Claire attracts the attention of another parking officer, an extremely blunt and aggressive man named Jay whose home life consists mainly of entertaining himself using the services of a webcam porn site and phone service. Claire witnesses him fighting with her best friend Wilma, a neighbor working for a delivery service who parks on the curb to unload her consignment, but does not bring it up with either party.

She develops a crush on Jay, but in each conversation Jay takes issue with some entirely innocuous comment Claire has made and storms off in disgust. Nonetheless, he keeps coming back for more. One night as Claire prepares to join him at the annual office Christmas party, she finds her mother slumped over—dead—in a bowl of mashed potato.

In shock, she simply picks up her coat and leaves for the party. She sits alone, watching Jay dance with another woman, until finally Jay asks in brutal terms what the matter is. She takes him home to show him the problem.

Claire decides that rather than call an ambulance she prefers to have the situation dealt with by family. She calls her mother's vain and self-obsessed sister, who lives in a different part of the city. Her aunt says it is too far to come at that hour of the night, but if she wants to, Claire can come pick up a necklace belonging to her mother.

After calling an undertaker who takes the body of Claire's mother away, Jay insists on staying the night to "take care" of Claire, promising to sleep on the couch. But he goes to Claire's narrow bed and starts to remove her clothes. After a few seconds of brutal thrusting, during which he talks to her as if she were the phone sex service he uses so frequently, he rolls over and falls asleep.

From that point on, Jay and Claire maintain a tenuous sort of relationship, hung mainly on Claire's optimism and Jay's desire for sex and attention. At work, Jay is suspended for his aggressive behavior with parking offenders, which has earned him an impressive complaints record. He watches a crafts documentary on carpentry and decides to make a love seat.

Jay offers to drive Claire to her aunt's house in Pasadena to pick up her mother's necklace, lying to her over his disciplining at work. He drives her to the other side of the city, with her seated on the makeshift love seat in his parking officer's vehicle. Her aunt insists that they all go out drinking; Jay and Claire end up in a hotel room. Jay gives Claire a tiny, pink PVC bikini and tells her she should lose weight, which Claire takes in stride, as she has previously with his other insinuations and outright insults.

During her next shift, Claire is informed that she is being promoted for her exemplary behavior. To celebrate she goes to Jay's apartment but swiftly realizes that he was visited by a prostitute immediately before her arrival. She leaves in disgust.

Jay goes to her apartment to apologize. Dressed in a more fashionable and confident style, she is outspokenly skeptical about his behavior, but submits when he pulls her to the floor for another round of uncomfortable sex. When it is over, Jay expresses that he has burgeoning feelings of commitment to Claire, but she asks him to leave, saying their relationship is over.

In the final scene, Claire once again walks her beat alone. Another vehicle nearly catches her at the site of her prior accident, but this time she escapes unscathed, and smiles in relief.

== Cast ==
- Samantha Morton as Claire Barney
- Teri Garr as twins mother Barney / aunt Tilde
- Jason Patric as Jay Caswell
- Illeana Douglas as Wilma

== Development ==
In an interview with Bijan Tehrani of Cinema Without Borders, Cecilia Miniucchi describes the event in Santa Monica that inspired the story for Expired:

I was walking by and witnessed a rather disturbing incident between a rough and impolite man and a gentle parking officer, a woman that was more scared than anything else. Then later, I was victim myself of one of those unwanted and unnecessary tickets, given to me by an angry parking officer, a man that was totally abusing his small authority. I thought to myself: I wonder what would happen if two of these parking officers, diametrically opposite in temperament, would meet and fall in love... I thought of this as a metaphor for life: the price any of us can, could and would pay for love.

== Critical reception ==
The film received mixed reviews from critics. As of December 11, 2022, the review aggregator Rotten Tomatoes reported that 59% of critics gave the film positive reviews, based on 12 reviews. Metacritic reported the film had an average score of 65 out of 100, based on 6 reviews.
