= Jason Patric =

American actor (born 1966)

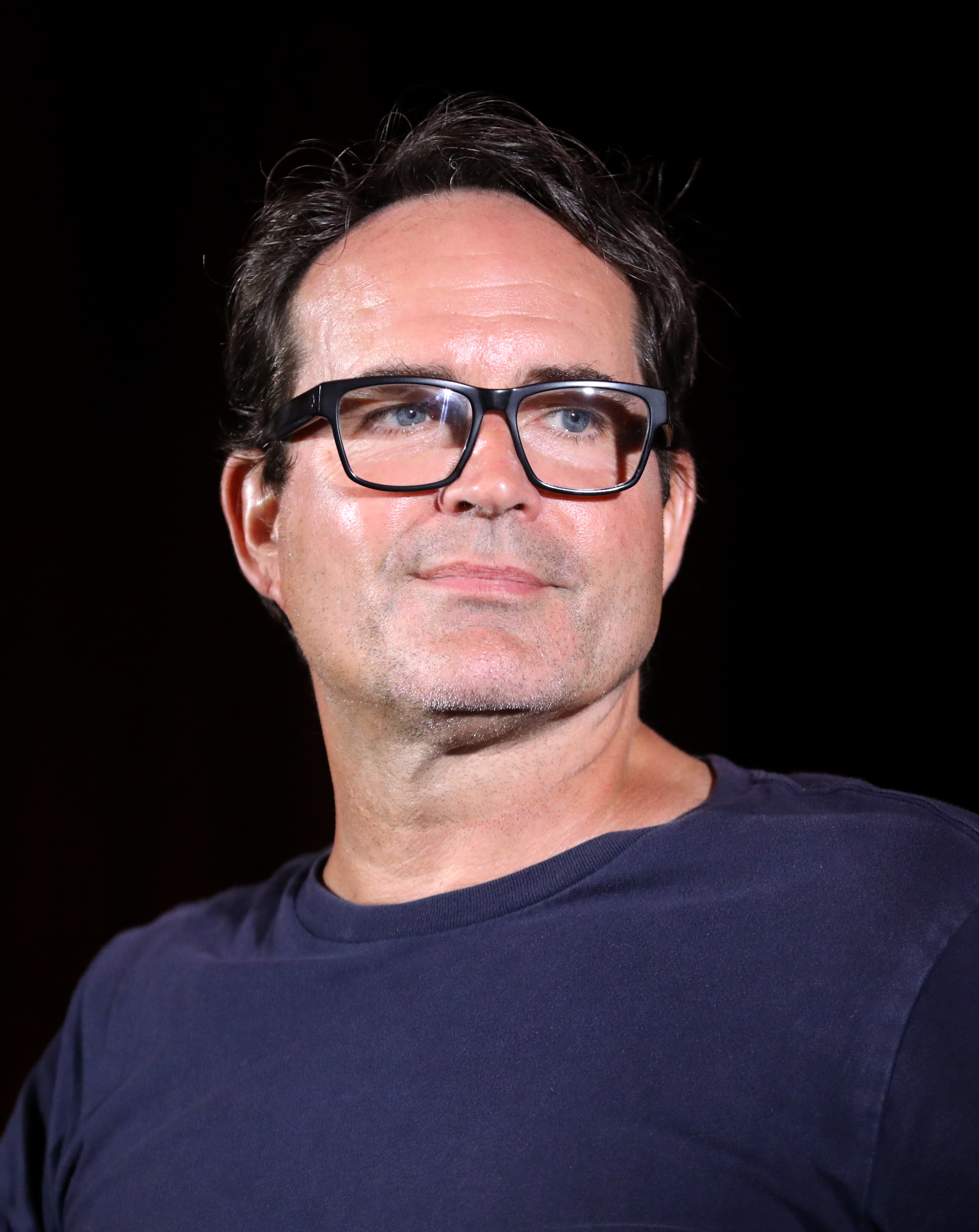
- Patric in 2024
- Born: John Anthony Miller III; June 17, 1966 (age 60); New York City, U.S.
- Occupation: Actor
- Years active: 1985–present
- Partner: Danielle Schreiber (2002–2006, 2011–2012)
- Children: 1
- Parents: Jason Miller (father); Linda Gleason (mother)
- Relatives: Jackie Gleason (grandfather); Joshua John Miller (half-brother)

John Anthony Miller III (born June 17, 1966), better known by his stage name Jason Patric, is an American film, television and stage actor. He is known for his roles in films such as The Lost Boys (1987), Rush (1991), Geronimo: An American Legend (1993), Sleepers (1996), Speed 2: Cruise Control (1997), Your Friends & Neighbors (1998), Narc (2002), The Alamo (2004), My Sister's Keeper (2009), and The Losers (2010). His father was actor and playwright Jason Miller, and his maternal grandfather was actor Jackie Gleason.

== Early life ==
Born in New York City in the borough of Queens, Patric is the eldest son and middle child of Academy Award–nominated actor and Pulitzer Prize–winning playwright Jason Miller (born John Anthony Miller Jr.) and actress Linda Miller (born Linda Mae Gleason). His maternal grandfather was actor and comedian Jackie Gleason. He has an older sister, Jennifer, and had a younger brother, Jordan, who died January 10, 2024; his half-brother is actor Joshua John Miller. His ancestry is mostly Irish, with some German.

Growing up in Upper Saddle River, New Jersey, he attended schools such as Cavallini Middle School and the all-boys Catholic school Salesian Roman Catholic Don Bosco Preparatory High School (Ramsey, New Jersey). In California, he attended Saint Monica Catholic High School (Santa Monica, California).

== Career ==
After graduation, he was cast in the television drama Toughlove with Bruce Dern. The following year, Patric was cast in Solarbabies alongside Peter DeLuise, Jami Gertz, Lukas Haas, James LeGros and Adrian Pasdar. Within a couple years, Patric would reunite with Gertz in The Lost Boys and After Dark, My Sweet with Dern. He co-starred with George Dzundza and Stephen Baldwin in The Beast.

In 1987, Patric had his breakout role as teenage vampire Michael Emerson in Joel Schumacher's The Lost Boys. The film was a critical and commercial success and Patric's look in the film drew comparisons to The Doors' lead vocalist Jim Morrison, and he was considered to portray the singer in the 1991 biographical film The Doors, directed by Oliver Stone, which later went to Val Kilmer.

In 1993, he starred alongside Gene Hackman and Robert Duvall as 1st Lt. Charles B. Gatewood in the movie Geronimo: An American Legend. His scenes in The Thin Red Line were cut before the film's release. He turned down the lead role in The Firm (1993), which went to Tom Cruise. He garnered excellent reviews for his performances as undercover narcotics officers in Rush (1991) and Narc (2002).

In 2004, he portrayed Jim Bowie, who died when the Alamo was captured in 1836 by the Mexican general, Santa Ana in the movie, The Alamo.

In 2005, Patric appeared on Broadway as "Brick" in a revival of Tennessee Williams' Cat on a Hot Tin Roof, opposite Ashley Judd, Ned Beatty and esteemed character actress Margo Martindale. He next appeared on Broadway opposite Brian Cox, Chris Noth, Kiefer Sutherland and Jim Gaffigan in a revival of his father Jason Miller's play, That Championship Season, which began previews on February 9, 2011, and closed on May 29, 2011. The play (written by Jason Miller) debuted in 1972, and won, among other awards, the Pulitzer Prize and the Tony Award.

In 2012, he began filming the Civil War film, Copperhead, but several weeks into the shoot, he was removed from the project by the director, Ronald F. Maxwell for "refusing to take instructions". His replacement was Billy Campbell.

== Personal life ==
Patric began dating actress Julia Roberts days after she canceled her wedding to his The Lost Boys co-star and best friend, Kiefer Sutherland, in June 1991. Patric had been invited to the wedding but was later uninvited by Sutherland as the date grew closer. According to Roberts, the wedding had been canceled long before the press claimed "days before the wedding", and that it was a mutual decision. On June 14, 1991, the day of what was supposed to be Roberts and Sutherland's wedding, Sutherland moved out of Roberts' Hollywood Hills house and Roberts traveled to Ireland with Patric.

In July 1991, Patric turned down a role that was originally set to be played by Sutherland in the western film Renegades, in which he would co-star with Roberts, but the project fell apart following the cancellation of Roberts and Sutherland's wedding. Patric and Roberts broke up in 1992. After over a decade without speaking to each other, Patric and Sutherland reconciled in the mid-2000s, and then co-starred on Broadway in a revival of Jason Miller's play That Championship Season in 2011, and they have been close friends ever since.

Patric then dated Danielle Schreiber off-and-on for approximately ten years. During the relationship, they conceived a son through in vitro fertilization. They separated in May 2012. Schreiber's attorneys argued that Patric was merely a sperm donor, as Schreiber and Patric had not married and the conception of the child was by artificial means; therefore, they argued that Patric had no custody rights. Patric sued for parental rights to the child, but lost the case at the trial court level. Following his loss in trial court, Patric lobbied the California legislature to give parental rights to sperm donors.

The Court of Appeal of California, however, ruled that the California Family Code did not preclude Patric from establishing that he was presumed a parent based on his post-birth conduct. In late 2014, he was legally recognized as the father of his son. This decision was upheld on appeal.

== Filmography ==
=== Film ===
Year	Film	Role	Notes
1986	Solarbabies	Jason	
1987	The Lost Boys	Michael Emerson	
1988	The Beast	Konstantin Koverchenko	
1990	Denial	Michael	
1990	After Dark, My Sweet	Kevin "Kid" Collins	
1990	Frankenstein Unbound	Lord Byron	
1990	Teach 109	Teach 109	Short film
1991	Rush	Detective Jim Raynor	
1993	Geronimo: An American Legend	1st Lieutenant Charles B. Gatewood	
1995	The Journey of August King	August King	
1996	Sleepers	Lorenzo "Shakes" Carcaterra	
1997	Speed 2: Cruise Control	LAPD Officer Alex Shaw	
1997	Incognito	Harry Donovan	
1998	Your Friends & Neighbors	Cary	Also producer
2002	Narc	Detective Nick Tellis	
2002	Three Days of Rain	Extra	Uncredited
2004	The Alamo	Colonel Jim Bowie	
2006	Walker Payne	Walker Payne	
2007	Expired	Jay Caswell	
2007	Shortcut to Happiness	Ray	Uncredited
2007	In the Valley of Elah	Lieutenant Kirklander	
2008	Downloading Nancy	Louis Farley	
2009	My Sister's Keeper	Brian Fitzgerald	
2010	The Losers	Max	
2010	Quality Time	Father	Short film
2011	Keyhole	Ulysses Pick	
2013	The Outsider	Detective Klein	
2013	Cavemen	Jack Bartlett	
2014	Rise of the Lonestar Ranger	Kip Duane	
2014	The Prince	Paul	
2016	The Abandoned	Dennis Cooper/Mr. Streak	
2016	Home Invasion	Mike	
2016	Lost & Found	Trent Walton	
2017	The Yellow Birds	Captain Anderson	
2017	Gangster Land	Detective Reed	
2018	Big Kill	The Preacher	
2020	The Vanished	Sheriff Baker	
2020	Runt	Coach Wilkes	
2020	Becoming	Kevin Lee	
2021	Burning at Both Ends	Andre Eerikäinen	
2022	Nightshade	Randy Bell	
2022	MK Ultra	Galvin Morgan	
2023	Shrapnel	Sean Beckwith	
2023	City of Dreams	Stevens	
2023	Til Death Do Us Part	Husband	
2024	Terrifier 3	Michael Shaw	
2024	Murder at Hollow Creek	Detective Harris	
2024	A Circus Tale & a Love Song	Ralph	
2024	Armor	James Brody	
2025	A Line of Fire	Josef	
2026	Man of War	Charlie	

=== Television ===
Year	Title	Role	Notes
1985	Toughlove	Gary Charters	Television film
1994	Saturday Night Live	Host	Episode: "Jason Patric/Blind Melon"
2005	Night Live: The Best of David Spade	Kevin	Television special
2008	Entourage	Himself	Episode: "Pie"
2011	Tilda	Andrew Brown	Unaired pilot
2016	Wayward Pines	Dr. Theo Yedlin	Main role
2018	The Girl in the Bathtub	A. Charles Peruto Jr.	Television film
2025	Law & Order: Organized Crime	Detective Tim McKenna	3 episodes

== Awards and nominations ==
Year	Award / Festival	Category	Work	Result	Ref.
1994	Western Heritage Awards	Wrangler Award for Best Theatrical Motion Picture	Geronimo: An American Legend (shared with cast and crew)	Won	
1998	Golden Raspberry Award	Worst Screen Couple	Speed 2: Cruise Control (shared with Sandra Bullock)	Nominated	
1998	Las Vegas Film Critics Society Awards	Best Supporting Actor	Your Friends & Neighbors	Won	
1999	Online Film Critics Society Awards	Best Supporting Actor	Your Friends & Neighbors	Nominated	
1999	Satellite Award	Best Performance by an Actor in a Supporting Role in a Dramatic Motion Picture	Your Friends & Neighbors	Nominated	
2003	Prism Awards	Best Performance in a Theatrical Feature Film	Narc	Nominated	
2007	Stockholm International Film Festival	Best Actor	Expired	Won	
