= After Dark, My Sweet =

1990 American film noir by James Foley

- Theatrical release poster
- Directed by: James Foley
- Screenplay by: James Foley; Robert Redlin
- Based on: After Dark, My Sweet by Jim Thompson
- Produced by: Ric Kidney; Robert Redlin
- Starring: Jason Patric; Rachel Ward; Bruce Dern; George Dickerson
- Cinematography: Mark Plummer
- Edited by: Howard E. Smith
- Music by: Maurice Jarre
- Production company: Avenue Pictures
- Distributed by: Avenue Pictures
- Release dates: May 17, 1990 (Cannes Film Market); August 24, 1990 (United States)
- Running time: 114 minutes
- Country: United States
- Language: English
- Budget: $6 million
- Box office: $2.7 million

After Dark, My Sweet is a 1990 American neo-noir crime thriller film directed by James Foley, written by Foley and Robert Redlin, and starring Jason Patric, Rachel Ward and Bruce Dern. It is based on the 1955 Jim Thompson novel of the same name.

== Plot ==
Ex-boxer Kevin "Kid" Collins is a drifter and an escapee from a mental hospital. In a desert town near Palm Springs he meets widow Fay Anderson who convinces him to help fix up the neglected estate her husband left and lets him sleep in a trailer out back, near her dying date palms. Collins stays on Fay’s neglected property, fixing what he can and sleeping among the fading trees. He drifts between moments of calm and flashes of memory from his boxing days and his time in the mental hospital, where overcrowding and neglect made it easy for him to escape. Fay drinks heavily, swings between warmth and cruelty, and seems to need Collins as much as she resents him. Her acquaintance Garrett “Uncle Bud” Stoker, who claims to be an ex-cop, slowly draws Collins into a kidnapping plan involving Charlie Vanderventer, the sickly son of a wealthy family. Collins hesitates and even tries to leave, but his need to be useful and wanted keeps pulling him back.

Collins meets Doc Goldman, a physician who quickly recognizes Collins’s fragile mental state and urges him to return to institutional care. Doc offers protection and stability, but his interest in Collins feels controlling and intrusive, and it threatens Collins’s bond with Fay. Caught between Doc’s paternal concern and Uncle Bud’s promises of money and purpose, Collins agrees to help with the kidnapping. The plan is carefully rehearsed, but from the start it goes wrong. Collins deliberately takes the wrong child first, then finally abducts Charlie, who is diabetic and becomes dangerously ill without insulin. Collins insists the boy must be kept alive, while Uncle Bud begins to see Charlie as a problem rather than a human being.

As pressure mounts, Uncle Bud reveals himself as manipulative and ruthless, willing to sacrifice Collins to protect himself and collect reward money by playing the hero. He also seems to owe money to a shady bartender named Bert, who may know about the kidnapping plot. Fay goes back and forth between guilt, fear, and self-interest, at times seeming to side with Uncle Bud. Collins, increasingly isolated and aware that he is being used, takes control of the situation. He steals insulin to save Charlie, confronts Uncle Bud, and stops him from killing either the boy or himself. When Doc Goldman finds out about the kidnapping plot, Collins accidentally kills him with a punch to the chest, which gives him a fatal heart attack.

Hiding Charlie in the back of their car, Collins and Fay follow Uncle Bud to the airport for the ransom money drop-off, but the police are lying in wait. Uncle Bud is ambushed and killed by Bert as the police swarm in. In the aftermath, their car is waved through the police dragnet by an unsuspecting cop who recognizes Collins from his boxing days. Collins hears on the car radio that he is being sought for the murder of Doc Goldman and for the kidnappings of both Charlie and Fay. By now, he understands that every path forward will end badly for him.

In the final moments, Collins drives toward the inevitable, pursued by police and cut off from any future with Fay. His last actions are deliberate and calm. To exonerate Fay, and put all the blame on himself, he goads her into shooting him by threatening to kill Charlie. He accepts his end as the only way to give meaning to his life, by saving both Fay and the child, even if Fay never fully understands what he did for her.

== Cast ==
- Jason Patric as Kevin "Kid" Collins
- Rachel Ward as Fay Anderson
- Bruce Dern as Garrett "Uncle Bud" Stoker
- George Dickerson as Doc Goldman
- Mike Hagerty as Truck Driver
- Rocky Giordani as Bert
- Corey Carrier as Jack
- James Cotton as Charlie Vanderventer

== Production ==
=== Filming locations ===
Filming took place in Mecca, California, part of the Coachella Valley.

== Release and reception ==
=== Box office ===
After Dark, My Sweet was given a limited release on August 24, 1990, and grossed $244,919 on its opening weekend. It grossed a total of $2.7 million.

=== Critical response ===
Film critic Roger Ebert included the film as part of his Great Movies list, saying, "After Dark, My Sweet is the movie that eluded audiences; it grossed less than $3 million, has been almost forgotten, and remains one of the purest and most uncompromising of modern film noir. It captures above all the lonely, exhausted lives of its characters."

Variety also received the film favorably: "Director/co-writer James Foley has given this near-perfect adaptation of a Jim Thompson novel a contempo setting and emotional realism that make it as potent as a snakebite...Lensed in the arid and existential sun-blasted landscape of Indio, Calif, the pungently seedy film creates a kind of genre unto itself, a film soleil, perhaps."

Writer David M. Meyers praised the script: "The screenplay, which hews closely to Jim Thompson's heartless novel, is unusually tight, spare, and well constructed."

Peter Travers of Rolling Stone wrote: "Patric is sensational as Collie; the pretty-boy actor ... is unrecognizable behind Collie's coarse stubble, slack jaw and haunted stare. Patric occupies a complex character with mesmerizing conviction. Like Thompson's prose, his performance is both repellent and fascinating."

When the video was released in 1991, Entertainment Weekly film critic Melissa Pierson wrote: "Fittingly, director James Foley (At Close Range) puts style over story, capturing the gritty, long-shadowed tone of his source material. After Dark, My Sweet looks simultaneously crisp and drenched in the yellow light of a strange dream, an effect that becomes especially haunting on video. In this alluring tour through unsettled emotional territory, Jason Patric (The Lost Boys) gives an exceptionally sharp performance as an ex-boxer with one screw loose and another turned down tight. He's drawn into a kidnapping scheme concocted by a former cop (Bruce Dern) and a sultry widow (Rachel Ward). Together, they visit a place where desire and pain are indistinguishable, and everything goes twistingly awry."

In an interview with Robert K. Elder for his book The Best Film You've Never Seen, director Austin Chick praises the movie for its cinematography, stating: "It's beautifully shot ... every frame and every camera move is clearly thought out and brilliantly, beautifully executed."

On the review aggregator website Rotten Tomatoes, 80% of 20 critics' reviews are positive. Metacritic, which uses a weighted average, assigned the film a score of 78 out of 100, based on 23 critics, indicating "generally favorable" reviews.
