= Your Friends & Neighbors (film) =

1998 film by Neil LaBute

- Theatrical release poster
- Directed by: Neil LaBute
- Written by: Neil LaBute
- Produced by: Steve Golin; Jason Patric
- Starring: Amy Brenneman; Aaron Eckhart; Catherine Keener; Nastassja Kinski; Jason Patric; Ben Stiller
- Cinematography: Nancy Schreiber
- Edited by: Joel Plotch
- Music by: Stewart Copeland
- Production companies: PolyGram Filmed Entertainment; Propaganda Films; Fleece
- Distributed by: Gramercy Pictures
- Release date: August 21, 1998
- Running time: 100 minutes
- Country: United States
- Language: English
- Budget: $5 million
- Box office: $4.7 million

Your Friends & Neighbors is a 1998 American black comedy film written and directed by Neil LaBute and starring Amy Brenneman, Aaron Eckhart, Catherine Keener, Nastassja Kinski, Jason Patric, and Ben Stiller in an ensemble cast. It was the first film to be reviewed on the website Rotten Tomatoes.

== Plot ==
In an unnamed American city, two middle-class couples deal with their unhappy relationships by experimenting with adultery. Jerry is a neurotic, self-obsessed college drama professor whose live-in girlfriend Terri, a copywriter for tampon boxes, is unsatisfied by their relationship due to his penchant for talking during sex. Mary, a freelance writer friend of Terri's, is married to Jerry's best friend Barry, a business executive who feels that no one can satisfy him sexually more than himself and is oblivious to Mary's sexual frustration.

When Jerry and Terri have dinner with Barry and Mary, Jerry secretly propositions Mary, confessing that he cannot stop thinking about her since they last saw each other. Mary admits that she has thought about him as well and accepts his offer. The next day, Terri meets and begins a secret romance with Cheri, a lesbian assistant at a local art gallery. Terri feels sexually satisfied with Cheri and enjoys their quiet moments, as opposed to Jerry's talkativeness.

Meanwhile, Cary, a doctor friend of Barry's, is a callous, manipulative womanizer who preys on naïve and emotionally vulnerable young women, using them for sex before remorselessly discarding them.

During Jerry and Mary's rendezvous at a local hotel, he is unable to perform sexually, prompting Mary to abruptly end their brief affair. A few days later, her frustration grows when Barry unwittingly takes her to the same hotel room to rekindle their romance.

In a sauna, Barry asks Jerry and Cary to reveal their best sexual experiences. In response, Cary recounts an incident in high school when he and three of his friends gang-raped a male classmate. Barry and Jerry are stunned yet intrigued by Cary's story. When Barry tries to persuade Jerry to reveal his best sexual experience, Jerry refuses. After being goaded in the locker room, Jerry angrily responds that his best sexual experience was with Barry's wife and leaves. Barry is speechless, while Cary, also caught off-guard, says, "That beats my story."

Terri is heartbroken after finding Mary's phone number in one of Jerry's playbooks. At a bookstore, Cary recognizes Terri and asks her out on a date, but after she rejects him, he verbally abuses her and accuses her of mistreating Jerry. During a chance encounter with Mary, Jerry seeks closure and proposes that they talk, but she berates him for suggesting the same hotel room to Barry and leaves him. That night, Barry confronts Mary about her affair with Jerry. The next day, Barry visits Jerry during a dress rehearsal, and Jerry apologizes for his indiscretion.

Jerry confronts Cheri at the art gallery over her affair with Terri, trying to understand why Terri would be interested in Cheri, but Cheri dismisses him for saying "stupid fucking things" to people. Over lunch, Jerry attempts to reconcile with Terri, acknowledging that they both made mistakes, but she nonchalantly breaks up with him.

Jerry continues his philandering lifestyle with his female drama students, though is still dissatisfied. Terri moves in with Cheri, although she quickly finds her emotional neediness irritating. After divorcing Mary, Barry can no longer achieve an erection even while masturbating. Mary moves in with Cary, who pressures her into sex and treats her coldly while she is pregnant with his child.

== Cast ==
- Amy Brenneman as Mary
- Aaron Eckhart as Barry
- Catherine Keener as Terri
- Nastassja Kinski as Cheri
- Jason Patric as Cary
- Ben Stiller as Jerry
- Lola Glaudini as Jerry's student (uncredited)

== Production ==
The film was financed in part with Jason Patric's $4.5–$8 million salary from starring in Speed 2: Cruise Control.

== Reception ==
=== Box office ===
Your Friends & Neighbors was released in the United States on August 21, 1998, in a limited release in 32 theaters, grossing $340,288 with an average of $10,634 per theater. The film's widest release was 246 theaters and it ended up grossing $4,714,658, against a $5 million production budget.

=== Critical response ===
On the review aggregator website Rotten Tomatoes, where it was the first ever film reviewed, Your Friends & Neighbors holds an approval rating of 77% based on 60 reviews, with an average rating of 7/10. The website's critics consensus reads, "Though it may strike some viewers as cold and unpleasant, Neil LaBute's Your Friends & Neighbors is an incisive critique of sexual politics wrapped up in a scathing black comedy." On Metacritic, which assigns a weighted average score out of 100 to reviews from mainstream critics, the film received an average score of 70, based on 27 critics, indicating "generally favorable" reviews.

Roger Ebert gave the film four out of four stars. While reviewing the film on At the Movies, while Ebert enjoyed the film (even praising it as one of the year's best films), Gene Siskel reviewed the film negatively, saying it was too much like LaBute's first film and calling the characters unbearable to be around.

=== Accolades ===
Jason Patric earned a Sierra Award for Best Supporting Actor from the Las Vegas Film Critics Society Awards. Patric also received a nomination for Best Supporting Actor in a Drama at the 3rd Golden Satellite Awards.
