= After Dark, My Sweet (novel) =

1955 novel by Jim Thompson

- First edition
- Author: Jim Thompson
- Language: English
- Genre: Crime fiction
- Publisher: Lion Books
- Publication date: 1955
- Publication place: United States

After Dark, My Sweet is a 1955 American crime novel by Jim Thompson.

== Plot ==
William Collins is a former boxer with a deadly accident in his past. Collins has broken out of his fourth mental hospital and met a con man and a beautiful woman, whose plans for him include murder and kidnapping.

== Film adaptation ==
The novel was adapted into a film of the same name in 1990.
