= The Chamber (1996 film) =

- Theatrical release poster
- Directed by: James Foley
- Screenplay by: William Goldman; Phil Alden Robinson (as "Chris Reese")
- Based on: The Chamber by John Grisham
- Produced by: John Davis; Brian Grazer; Ron Howard
- Starring: Chris O'Donnell; Gene Hackman; Faye Dunaway; Lela Rochon; Robert Prosky; Raymond J. Barry; David Marshall Grant
- Cinematography: Ian Baker
- Edited by: Mark Warner
- Music by: Carter Burwell
- Production companies: Imagine Entertainment; Davis Entertainment
- Distributed by: Universal Pictures
- Release date: October 11, 1996
- Running time: 112 minutes
- Country: United States
- Language: English
- Budget: $40 million
- Box office: $22.5 million

The Chamber is a 1996 American legal thriller film directed by James Foley. It is based on John Grisham's 1994 novel of the same name. The film stars Chris O'Donnell, Gene Hackman (who had previously appeared in another Grisham adaptation, The Firm), Faye Dunaway, Lela Rochon, Robert Prosky, Raymond J. Barry and David Marshall Grant.

The Chamber was released by Universal Pictures on October 11, 1996. The film received negative reviews from critics and was a box office bomb, grossing $22.5 million against a $40 million budget.

== Plot ==
In April 1967, the office of Marvin Kramer, a Jewish civil rights lawyer in Indianola, Mississippi, is bombed by the Ku Klux Klan, killing Kramer's young twin sons Josh and John and leading to the amputation of Kramer's legs and his later suicide. Klansman Sam Cayhall is convicted of murder and sentenced to die in the gas chamber at the Mississippi State Penitentiary.

Twenty-nine years later, Adam Hall, a young attorney in Chicago and Cayhall's grandson, goes to Jackson, Mississippi to take over the case in the last weeks before his scheduled execution. He reconnects with his aunt Lee Bowen, an alcoholic socialite who has managed to avoid public association with her infamous father, and who warns Adam about dredging up the past. On death row, Sam brags about his participation in the Klan bombing campaign of which the Kramer bombing was a part, though he denies that any of the bombings were intended to kill. He taunts Adam for his youth, legal inexperience, opposition to racism, and his father Eddie's suicide, but he agrees to allow Adam to represent him, though he forbids Adam from seeking clemency from Mississippi Governor David McAllister. As Adam begins to argue the case, he is approached by the Governor through an aide, Nora Stark, who suggests that he might consider clemency if Sam provides information about unidentified co-conspirators to the bombing.

Adam's investigation unearths inconsistencies in the facts of the original case. Stark and Wyn Lettner, the original FBI agent who investigated the case, indicate that the bombing may have been the result of a conspiracy involving the Mississippi State Sovereignty Commission and White Citizens' Councils, which were active at the time of the bombing in opposition to civil rights.

Sam refuses to authorize Adam to seek access to the Sovereignty Commission's files, sealed by order of the state legislature, fearing it would expose Sam's former associates in the Klan, as well as allowing the Governor to obtain useful information on political enemies, which he indicates is the Governor's real reason to unseal the files.

Adam continues to work through the courts, filing and arguing motions for a stay of execution, including on the grounds that Sam was legally insane and unable to tell right from wrong, due to his indoctrination into the KKK. At the same time, Lee, having lapsed back into alcoholism, reveals to Adam that in the early 1950s, as children, she and Eddie witnessed their father murder the family's African-American neighbor Joe Lincoln during a fight that started because Eddie had wrongly accused Lincoln's son Quince of stealing a toy. Eddie blamed himself for the murder and Lee for failing to stop Sam; the guilt contributed to Eddie's suicide and Lee's alcoholism. Lee also reveals that their father was indoctrinated into the Klan as a child.

Adam and Nora secretly gain access to the Sovereignty Commission's sealed files, which prove a wider conspiracy to the bombing, and also indicate the participation of an accomplice. Lettner resurfaces, and reveals to Adam that the FBI had identified the accomplice, Rollie Wedge, whom the FBI had never been able to prove responsible, but who has reunited with other Klan members to commemorate the bombing on the eve of the pending execution.

Adam goes to a Klan reunion but is beaten by several members and threatened by Wedge. Adam's persistence, the revelation of how much Sam's hatred had destroyed his family, and his impending execution begin to affect Sam, and he softens, reconciling with Lee and expressing remorse for his actions and their effects on his family. Sam rejects the Klan when Wedge visits him in prison to encourage him to remain silent, and it is revealed that Wedge built and detonated the bomb.

Adam's motions for a stay are denied by the courts, including the United States Supreme Court. Despite Sam authorizing the release of relevant Sovereignty Commission files, the Governor refuses to grant clemency, betraying him and Adam, while using the files as political leverage as Sam had predicted. Wedge, identified in the files, is arrested while Sam is executed in the gas chamber, though Adam remains a confidant and advocate for Sam up until his execution. Adam and Lee reconcile.

== Cast ==
- Chris O'Donnell as Adam Hall
- Gene Hackman as Sam Cayhall
- Faye Dunaway as Lee Bowen
- Robert Prosky as E. Garner Goodman
- Raymond J. Barry as Rollie Wedge
- Bo Jackson as Sgt. Packer
- Lela Rochon as Nora Stark
- David Marshall Grant as Governor McAllister
- Nicholas Pryor as Judge Slattery
- Harve Presnell as Attorney General Roxburgh
- Richard Bradford as Wyn Lettner
- Greg Goossen as J.B. Gullitt
- Seth Isler as Marvin Kramer
- Millie Perkins as Ruth Kramer
- Josef Sommer as Phelps Bowen
- Jane Kaczmarek as Dr. Anne Biddows

== Production history ==
The first four films based on John Grisham novels had all been big hits, and producer Brian Grazer persuaded Universal to buy the film rights to The Chamber for $3.75 million before the book had even been written, based on a one-page outline. Ron Howard was originally set to direct the film for Universal. Grazer said "I bought it before I saw any words. I just knew it was Grisham, and I wanted to snatch it. I bought it based on what [Grisham’s late agent, Jay Garon] said. Which didn’t totally correspond with the synopsis paragraph I read. And that didn’t exactly correspond with the book."

Grisham's novel was different from his earlier works. He said before he finished he "got some unsolicited vibes on how to write. Some of the studio people had some ideas about what should be in the book, and it was infuriating."

In May 1994, it was reported that William Goldman was paid $1 million to write the script. Howard left the project in May 1995 because of what he described as "a hunch", although he stayed on as a producer, saying "It's a strong story, and William Goldman is doing great work on the screenplay." Brad Pitt was committed to playing Adam Hall, but left the project when Howard left to direct Ransom.

James Foley came on board to direct the film, with Chris O'Donnell and Gene Hackman agreeing to star. Some work on the script was done by Phil Alden Robinson; then Foley began rewriting the script. But Grisham was unhappy with the changes. William Goldman described the project as a "total wipeout disaster... a terrible experience", and claims he never saw the finished movie. Foley declared, "after eight movies for some reason I'm getting to do exactly what I want. I mean, The Chamber is as great an opportunity for me as it can possibly be thematically and I've got Gene Hackman so it's like there is no limit. If it isn't great it's only because of me."

== Filming locations ==
Scenes were filmed in a photo realistic recreation of the gas chamber on studio sets in Los Angeles. Other locations were filmed in Chicago, Jackson, Mississippi, Indianola, Mississippi, Greenwood, Mississippi, Parchman, Mississippi, and Cleveland, Mississippi.

== Reception ==
Critical reaction to The Chamber has been negative. On Rotten Tomatoes the film has an approval rating of 12% based on reviews from 25 critics. On Metacritic the film has a score of 45 out of 100 based on reviews from 18 critics. Audiences surveyed by CinemaScore gave the film a grade "B+" on scale of A to F.

Roger Ebert gave the film two stars out of four, remarking: "In the early days of X-rated movies, they were always careful to include something of 'redeeming social significance' to justify their erotic content. Watching The Chamber, I was reminded of that time. The attitudes about African Americans and Jews here represent the pornography of hate, and although the movie ends by punishing evil, I got the sinking feeling that, just as with the old sex films, by the time the ending came around, some members of the audience had already gotten what they bought their tickets for." James Berardinelli also gave the film two stars out of four, saying: "Plot-wise, The Chamber is full of seeming irrelevancies. The movie should have been streamlined better; there's no need to try to include virtually every character from the book. [...] The Chamber [...] is mechanical and artificial, and tells you what to think."

Grisham called the film a "disaster" and a "train wreck from the beginning". He added, "It could not have been handled worse by those involved, including me. I made a fundamental error when I sold the film rights before I finished writing the book. It was a dreadful movie. Gene Hackman was the only good thing in it." Faye Dunaway earned a nomination for the Golden Raspberry Award for Worst Supporting Actress for her performances in this film and Dunston Checks In, but she did not win the award at the 17th Golden Raspberry Awards.

== See also ==
- Civil rights movement in popular culture
- Civil Rights Movement
