= Defending the Devil =

Defending the Devil: My Story as Ted Bundy's Last Lawyer
- Author: Polly Nelson
- Language: English
- Subject: Ted Bundy trial; capital punishment
- Publisher: William Morrow & Company
- Publication date: 1994
- Publication place: United States
- Media type: Print (Hardcover, Paperback)
- Pages: 336
- ISBN: 0688108237
- OCLC: 28722570
- LC Class: KF224.B86 N45

Defending the Devil: My Story as Ted Bundy's Last Lawyer is a 1994 nonfiction book written by American lawyer Polly Nelson, who was a member of serial killer Ted Bundy's legal defense team from 1986 to his execution in 1989. It was published by William Morrow & Company.

== Description ==
Nelson was Bundy's final lawyer before his execution in 1989. The book describes her attempts to spare Bundy the death penalty, and gives her impressions of him as a person, calling him, "the very definition of heartless evil".

== Court case ==
Nelson sued novelist John Grisham in 1995, alleging his book The Chamber had striking similarities to her work. After Grisham prevailed in a lower court ruling in 1996, the case was dismissed on appeal in 1997.
