= Polly Nelson =

American attorney and author (born 1952)

- Born: Polly Jean Nelson; 1952 (age 73–74); Minnesota, United States
- Education: University of Minnesota (BA, JD)
- Occupations: Lawyer, author

Polly Jean Nelson (born 1952) is an American attorney and author. She is best known as a member of serial killer Ted Bundy's last defense team from 1986 until his execution in January 1989.

== Education and early career ==
Nelson grew up in central Minnesota, the eldest of five children. After receiving her undergraduate degree from the University of Minnesota in 1975, she spent two years as a social worker in Warren, Minnesota, followed by three years licensing day care facilities at the Minnesota Department of Public Welfare in St. Paul. In 1981, she enrolled at the University of Minnesota Law School, where she became president of the Minnesota Law Review and received her Juris Doctor degree in 1984. In 1985, she worked as a law clerk in the United States Court of Appeals for the Second Circuit.

== Bundy litigation ==
In 1986, Nelson joined the Washington, D.C. law firm of Wilmer Cutler and Pickering as a junior associate. A few months later, she accepted a pro bono assignment from the Florida Office of the Capital Collateral Representative (CCR) to assist in efforts to stay Ted Bundy's imminent execution on multiple murder convictions. Although she had no previous first-hand experience in criminal law or the appeals process, she and co-counsel James Earl Coleman Jr. were able to secure three stays before Bundy was finally executed on January 24, 1989.

== Aftermath ==
Nelson was fired by Wilmer Cutler a few months after Bundy's execution. Bundy's defense had cost the firm, it claimed, in excess of $1.5 million, the estimated amount Nelson and Coleman would have earned for the firm had they been representing paying clients. In 1989, she was appointed to the District of Columbia Board of Parole, and later served as general counsel at Adcom Worldwide and legal counsel/privacy officer at Computer Network Technology.

== Book and plagiarism litigation against John Grisham ==
In 1994, Nelson's book Defending the Devil: My Story as Ted Bundy's Last Lawyer was published by William Morrow & Company. In addition to a detailed description of the appeals, motions, and other legal maneuvers that were employed in the attempt to save her client from the electric chair, Nelson describes her own intellectual and emotional development during that three-year period. There is also a summary of the efforts made by Bundy and various psychiatrists to explain why he did what he did. Nelson's account later received harsh criticism from Michael Mello, the CCR attorney who originally sought outside help in filing Bundy's appeals, who wrote that "sending Bundy's case from CCR was one of the worst decisions I've made as a deathworker".

In 1995, Nelson filed suit in the U.S. District Court for the District of Columbia against novelist John Grisham and his publisher Doubleday for copyright infringement. She alleged that Grisham's book The Chamber "blatantly appropriated central themes, plot twists, characters and descriptive details" from Defending the Devil. In 1996, Judge Royce Lamberth dismissed the suit, calling the charges "meritless". A year later, the U.S. Court of Appeals for the District of Columbia Circuit unanimously dismissed Nelson's appeal, noting that it "does not warrant an opinion". Nelson was ordered to pay attorneys' fees for both parties.
