= The Chamber (novel) =

Novel by John Grisham

- First edition cover
- Author: John Grisham
- Original title: The Chamber
- Language: English
- Genre: Legal thriller novel
- Publisher: Doubleday
- Publication date: 1994
- Publication place: United States
- Media type: Print (Hardcover, Paperback)
- Pages: 496
- ISBN: 0-385-42472-8
- OCLC: 30075172
- Dewey Decimal: 813/.54 20
- LC Class: PS3557.R5355 C47 1994

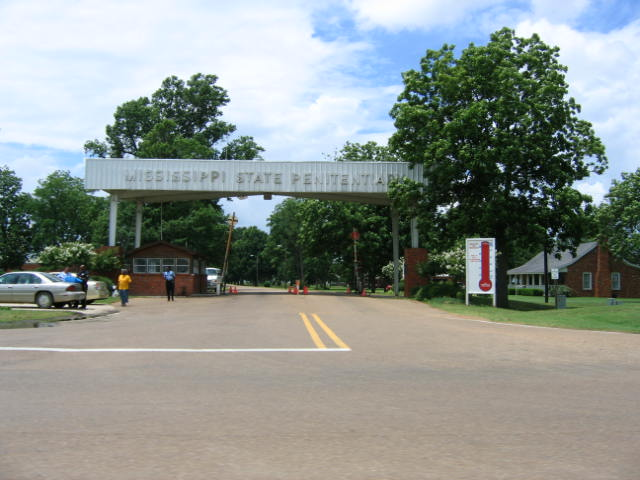
Mississippi State Penitentiary, the primary setting of the book

The Chamber (1994) is a legal thriller written by American author John Grisham. It is Grisham's fifth novel.

== Plot ==
In 1967, in Greenville, Mississippi, the office of Jewish lawyer Marvin Kramer is bombed, injuring Kramer and killing his two young sons. Sam Cayhall, a member of the Ku Klux Klan, is identified, arrested and tried for their murders, committed in retaliation for Kramer's involvement in the Civil Rights Movement. Sam's first two trials, engineered by his Klan-connected lawyer, each end in a mistrial. Thirteen years later, the FBI pressures a suspected associate to testify against Sam at a third trial. Sam is convicted and sentenced to death by lethal gas. He is sent to the Mississippi State Penitentiary and placed on death row.

Now without a lawyer, Sam becomes a pro bono case for a team of anti-death penalty lawyers from the large—and Jewish—Chicago law firm of Kravitz and Bane. Representing Sam is his own grandson, Adam Hall, who travels to the firm's Memphis office to aid Sam in the final month before his scheduled execution. Although lacking experience in death penalty cases, Adam is determined to argue a stay for his grandfather. Sam, despite his violent past, is one of the few living links to Adam's family history. Sam's alcoholic daughter, Lee Cayhall Booth, slowly reveals the family's tragic past to her nephew, Adam.

Initially uncooperative, Sam eventually opens up to Adam and reveals a remarkable depth of hard-won legal knowledge, regularly preparing his own briefs and court motions. Despite his Klan past, he readily helps Black fellow prisoners as well as White ones. Adam interviews the FBI agent in charge of the original case and realizes that Sam almost certainly did not commit the actual crime for which he had been found guilty, although he was present. Nevertheless, Sam has a long and largely-secret history of Klan-related crimes, including several murders. Dogan, the associate who testified against Sam at his third trial, has apparently been murdered by the Klan. Sam himself will not reveal if another associate exists, thus not violating the Klan's loyalty oath.

Adam desperately files motion after motion and argues some of them before judges. He seeks to persuade Mississippi's governor to grant a reprieve, knowing full well that such a move is politically impossible; Sam forbids such a move, suspecting that the governor is using him for political gain. All appeals are finally exhausted. Sam is now repentant, but does not want Adam as a witness to the execution. He faces the last moment with courage and fortitude, publicly repudiating his past with the Klan, and dies proud of his grandson and happy to have forged a strong link with him during this last month. The sentence is carried out, Sam having ordered Adam to walk away and not watch him die.

With Sam and Dogan dead, no one knows that Roland, the third man who prepared and set off the bomb, is still free and living nearby under a false identity and observing the progress of the case—having graduated from Klan member to a full-fledged "proud fascist" and neo-Nazi. The reader knows—but Adam never does—that Roland stalked the young lawyer and considered killing him, but concluded it was not necessary and that Sam would take the secret to his grave. Meanwhile, Adam, sickened but fascinated by the experience—and disliking the idea of having a career as a corporate lawyer—quits Kravitz and Bane. Instead he accepts a poorly-paid position with a group of anti-death penalty lawyers.

== Lawsuit and dismissal ==
Lawyer and author Polly Nelson sued Grisham in 1995, alleging The Chamber had striking similarities to Defending the Devil, her nonfiction book about her experiences as lawyer for serial killer Ted Bundy. After Grisham prevailed in a lower court ruling in 1996, the case was dismissed on appeal in 1997.

== Film adaptation ==
In 1996, The Chamber was made into a feature film starring Gene Hackman and Chris O'Donnell. The movie received mostly negative reviews. The film rights were sold before Grisham had written the novel. While writing it, he had input from studio executives, which Grisham thought "was infuriating". The finished novel was different from the original idea sold to producer Brian Grazer, which led to several conflicts during production. Grisham called the film a "disaster" and a "train wreck from the beginning". He added, "It could not have been handled worse by those involved, including me. I made a fundamental error when I sold the film rights before I finished writing the book. It was a dreadful movie. Gene Hackman was the only good thing in it."
