= List of ended Netflix original programming (2021–2025) =

These shows are worldwide or regional Netflix Originals and have either completed their runs or Netflix stopped producing episodes. A show is also assumed to have ended if there has been no confirmed news of renewal at least one year after the show's last episode was released.

== Drama ==
Title	Genre	Premiere	Finale	Seasons	Runtime	Notes
Fate: The Winx Saga	Teen drama fantasy	January 22, 2021	September 16, 2022	2 seasons, 13 episodes	47–55 min	
Firefly Lane	Drama	February 3, 2021	April 27, 2023	2 seasons, 26 episodes	43–70 min	
Behind Her Eyes	Psychological thriller	February 17, 2021		6 episodes	46–53 min	(Note: Miniseries)
The One	Science fiction	March 12, 2021		1 season, 8 episodes	38–44 min	
The Irregulars	Mystery drama	March 26, 2021		1 season, 8 episodes	49–58 min	
Shadow and Bone	Fantasy drama	April 23, 2021	March 16, 2023	2 seasons, 16 episodes	45–63 min	
Jupiter's Legacy	Superhero epic	May 7, 2021		1 season, 8 episodes	35–56 min	
Halston	Drama	May 14, 2021		5 episodes	44–53 min	
Sweet Tooth	Fantasy drama	June 4, 2021	June 6, 2024	3 seasons, 24 episodes	37–57 min	
Jiva!	Drama	June 24, 2021		1 season, 5 episodes	26–50 min	
Sex/Life	Drama	June 25, 2021	March 2, 2023	2 seasons, 14 episodes	43–56 min	
Hit & Run	Thriller	August 6, 2021		1 season, 9 episodes	39–58 min	
Brand New Cherry Flavor	Horror-thriller	August 13, 2021		8 episodes	36–51 min	
Clickbait	Thriller	August 25, 2021		8 episodes	42–52 min	
King of Boys: The Return of the King	Crime drama	August 27, 2021		7 episodes	60–79 min	
Midnight Mass	Horror	September 24, 2021		7 episodes	59–70 min	
Maid	Comedy drama	October 1, 2021		10 episodes	47–60 min	
Colin in Black & White	Biopic	October 29, 2021		6 episodes	27–35 min	
Cowboy Bebop	Science fiction	November 19, 2021		1 season, 10 episodes	37–60 min	
True Story	Drama	November 24, 2021		7 episodes	27–58 min	
Stay Close	Thriller	December 31, 2021		8 episodes	39–53 min	
Archive 81	Found footage horror	January 14, 2022		1 season, 8 episodes	45–58 min	
In From the Cold	Thriller	January 28, 2022		1 season, 8 episodes	41–53 min	
Inventing Anna	Drama	February 11, 2022		9 episodes	59–82 min	
Vikings: Valhalla	Historical drama	February 25, 2022	July 11, 2024	3 seasons, 24 episodes	43–59 min	
Pieces of Her	Thriller	March 4, 2022		1 season, 8 episodes	42–62 min	
Anatomy of a Scandal	Drama	April 15, 2022		6 episodes	43–48 min	
Blood Sisters	Thriller	May 5, 2022		4 episodes	52–59 min	
Savage Beauty	Drama	May 12, 2022	June 28, 2024	2 seasons, 12 episodes	42–54 min	
First Kill	Horror drama	June 10, 2022		1 season, 8 episodes	42–59 min	
Resident Evil	Science fiction horror	July 14, 2022		1 season, 8 episodes	44–61 min	
Country Queen	Drama	July 15, 2022		1 season, 6 episodes	58–62 min	
Keep Breathing	Survival drama	July 28, 2022		6 episodes	31–40 min	
Justice Served	Drama	July 29, 2022		1 season, 6 episodes	38–44 min	
The Sandman	Fantasy	August 5, 2022	July 31, 2025	2 seasons, 23 episodes	37–70 min	
Echoes	Mystery thriller	August 19, 2022		7 episodes	40–54 min	
Lost Ollie	Drama	August 24, 2022		4 episodes	41–51 min	
Partner Track	Legal drama	August 26, 2022		1 season, 10 episodes	40–45 min	
Devil in Ohio	Thriller	September 2, 2022		8 episodes	40–49 min	
The Imperfects	Science fiction	September 8, 2022		1 season, 10 episodes	39–45 min	
Heartbreak High	Teen drama	September 14, 2022	March 25, 2026	3 seasons, 24 episodes	44–52 min	
Monster: The Jeffrey Dahmer Story	Crime drama	September 21, 2022		10 episodes	45–63 min	
The Midnight Club	Teen horror drama	October 7, 2022		1 season, 10 episodes	48–58 min	
From Scratch	Drama	October 21, 2022		8 episodes	49–58 min	
Guillermo del Toro's Cabinet of Curiosities	Horror anthology	October 25, 2022	October 28, 2022	1 season, 8 episodes	38–64 min	
Half Bad: The Bastard Son & the Devil Himself	Fantasy drama	October 28, 2022		1 season, 8 episodes	41–53 min	
1899	Epic period mystery horror	November 17, 2022		1 season, 8 episodes	50–62 min	
Far from Home	Coming-of-age drama	December 16, 2022		1 season, 5 episodes	32–54 min	
The Recruit	Spy adventure	December 16, 2022	January 30, 2025	2 seasons, 14 episodes	50–62 min	
The Witcher: Blood Origin	Fantasy drama	December 25, 2022		4 episodes	42–63 min	
Treason	Spy drama	December 26, 2022		5 episodes	37–44 min	
Kaleidoscope	Heist drama	January 1, 2023		8 episodes	34–56 min	
Shanty Town	Crime drama	January 20, 2023		1 season, 6 episodes	35–46 min	
Lockwood & Co.	Supernatural detective thriller	January 27, 2023		1 season, 8 episodes	37–49 min	
Unseen	Crime thriller	March 29, 2023	May 2, 2025	2 seasons, 12 episodes	40–52 min	
Transatlantic	Historical drama	April 7, 2023		7 episodes	46–56 min	
Florida Man	Crime drama	April 13, 2023		7 episodes	41–56 min	
Obsession	Erotic thriller	April 13, 2023		4 episodes	33–43 min	
Queen Charlotte: A Bridgerton Story	Historical drama	May 4, 2023		6 episodes	54–86 min	
Glamorous	Drama	June 22, 2023		1 season, 10 episodes	39–46 min	
Painkiller	Crime drama	August 10, 2023		6 episodes	41–59 min	
Who Is Erin Carter?	Action-adventure	August 24, 2023		7 episodes	44–54 min	
Miseducation	Coming-of-age drama	September 15, 2023		1 season, 6 episodes	33–42 min	
The Fall of the House of Usher	Horror drama	October 12, 2023		8 episodes	56–76 min	
Bodies	Crime thriller	October 19, 2023		8 episodes	55–61 min	
All the Light We Cannot See	Historical drama	November 2, 2023		4 episodes	51–62 min	
Fool Me Once	Thriller drama	January 1, 2024		8 episodes	35–55 min	
The Brothers Sun	Action drama	January 4, 2024		1 season, 8 episodes	47–69 min	
Boy Swallows Universe	Coming-of-age drama	January 11, 2024		7 episodes	49–77 min	
Griselda	Biopic crime drama	January 25, 2024		6 episodes	48–59 min	
One Day	Romantic drama	February 8, 2024		14 episodes	19–38 min	
Ripley	Psychological thriller	April 4, 2024		8 episodes	44–76 min	
Baby Reindeer	Drama	April 11, 2024		7 episodes	27–45 min	
Dead Boy Detectives	Supernatural drama	April 25, 2024		1 season, 8 episodes	52–57 min	
A Man in Full	Drama	May 2, 2024		6 episodes	38–48 min	
Postcards	Drama	May 3, 2024		1 season, 6 episodes	26–37 min	
Eric	Crime drama	May 30, 2024		6 episodes	52–55 min	
The Decameron	Period drama	July 25, 2024		8 episodes	48–60 min	
The Perfect Couple	Crime drama	September 5, 2024		6 episodes	42–63 min	
Monsters: The Lyle and Erik Menendez Story	Crime drama	September 19, 2024		9 episodes	36–65 min	
Territory	Drama	October 24, 2024		1 season, 6 episodes	54–62 min	
The Madness	Conspiracy thriller	November 28, 2024		8 episodes	43–58 min	
Missing You	Thriller drama	January 1, 2025		5 episodes	41–46 min	
American Primeval	Western	January 9, 2025		6 episodes	36–63 min	
Apple Cider Vinegar	Crime drama	February 6, 2025		6 episodes	61–65 min	
Zero Day	Political thriller	February 20, 2025		6 episodes	43–58 min	
Toxic Town	Drama	February 27, 2025		4 episodes	47–65 min	
Adolescence	Drama	March 13, 2025		4 episodes	51–65 min	
Pulse	Medical drama	April 3, 2025		1 season, 10 episodes	43–53 min	
Ransom Canyon	Romance Western	April 17, 2025	July 23, 2026	2 seasons, 18 episodes	40–57 min	
The Survivors	Mystery drama	June 6, 2025		6 episodes	46–53 min	
The Waterfront	Drama	June 19, 2025		1 season, 8 episodes	42–55 min	
Hostage	Political thriller	August 21, 2025		5 episodes	38–46 min	
Black Rabbit	Drama	September 18, 2025		8 episodes	44–68 min	
Wayward	Thriller	September 25, 2025		8 episodes	40–50 min	
Monster: The Ed Gein Story	Crime drama	October 3, 2025		8 episodes	45–65 min	
Bad Influencer	Crime drama	October 31, 2025		1 season, 7 episodes	43–51 min	
Death by Lightning	Period drama	November 6, 2025		4 episodes	47–66 min	
The Abandons	Western	December 4, 2025		1 season, 7 episodes	35–52 min	

== Comedy ==
Title	Genre	Premiere	Finale	Seasons	Runtime	Notes
The Crew	Workplace comedy	February 15, 2021		1 season, 10 episodes	20–30 min	
The Upshaws	Sitcom	May 12, 2021	January 15, 2026	7 parts, 60 episodes	22–30 min	
The Chair	Comedy drama	August 20, 2021		1 season, 6 episodes	27–32 min	
Pretty Smart	Sitcom	October 8, 2021		1 season, 10 episodes	22–26 min	
Decoupled	Comedy	December 17, 2021		1 season, 8 episodes	25–36 min	
The Woman in the House Across the Street from the Girl in the Window	Dark comedy thriller	January 28, 2022		8 episodes	22–29 min	
Murderville	Crime comedy/Improvisational	February 3, 2022		1 season, 6 episodes	29–35 min	
Eternally Confused and Eager for Love	Comedy drama	March 18, 2022		8 episodes	20–24 min	
Hard Cell	Mockumentary	April 12, 2022		1 season, 6 episodes	24–27 min	
The Pentaverate	Comedy	May 5, 2022		1 season, 6 episodes	21–31 min	
God's Favorite Idiot	Workplace comedy	June 15, 2022		1 season, 8 episodes	22–30 min	
Boo, Bitch	Comedy	July 8, 2022		8 episodes	21–27 min	
Uncoupled	Comedy	July 29, 2022		1 season, 8 episodes	27–31 min	(Note: These shows were available at a time as Netflix originals, but have been since removed from the service.)
Chad and JT Go Deep	Comedy	August 23, 2022		1 season, 6 episodes	19–22 min	
Mo	Comedy	August 24, 2022	January 30, 2025	2 seasons, 16 episodes	21–39 min	
Blockbuster	Workplace comedy	November 3, 2022		1 season, 10 episodes	25–28 min	
That '90s Show	Teen sitcom	January 19, 2023	August 22, 2024	2 seasons, 26 episodes	21–30 min	
Freeridge	Comedy	February 2, 2023		1 season, 8 episodes	25–31 min	
Wellmania	Comedy drama	March 29, 2023		1 season, 8 episodes	26–35 min	
Unstable	Workplace comedy	March 30, 2023	August 1, 2024	2 seasons, 16 episodes	20–30 min	
FUBAR	Spy action comedy	May 25, 2023	June 12, 2025	2 seasons, 16 episodes	42–59 min	
Survival of the Thickest	Comedy drama	July 13, 2023	July 2, 2026	3 seasons, 24 episodes	22–28 min	
Everything Now	Comedy drama	October 5, 2023		1 season, 8 episodes	44–50 min	
Neon	Comedy	October 19, 2023		1 season, 8 episodes	26–30 min	
Obliterated	Action comedy	November 30, 2023		1 season, 8 episodes	44–57 min	
The Vince Staples Show	Comedy	February 15, 2024	November 6, 2025	2 seasons, 11 episodes	19–28 min	
Bodkin	Thriller comedy drama	May 9, 2024		1 season, 7 episodes	44–56 min	
Kaos	Dark comedy	August 29, 2024		1 season, 8 episodes	45–56 min	
No Good Deed	Dark comedy	December 12, 2024		1 season, 8 episodes	30–39 min	
The Residence	Comedy drama	March 20, 2025		1 season, 8 episodes	47–87 min	
Miss Governor	Political sitcom	May 22, 2025	August 14, 2025	1 season, 16 episodes	24–34 min	
Sirens	Black comedy	May 22, 2025		5 episodes	52–63 min	
Too Much	Romantic comedy	July 10, 2025		1 season, 10 episodes	31–56 min	
Boots	Military comedy drama	October 9, 2025		1 season, 8 episodes	40–50 min	
Son of a Donkey	Comedy	October 30, 2025		1 season, 6 episodes	21–28 min	

== Kids & family ==
Title	Genre	Premiere	Finale	Seasons	Runtime	Notes
Zero Chill	Sport/Teen drama	March 15, 2021		1 season, 10 episodes	26–34 min	
Waffles + Mochi	Cooking/Educational	March 16, 2021		1 season, 10 episodes	25–31 min	
Country Comfort	Sitcom	March 19, 2021		1 season, 10 episodes	20–27 min	
Dad Stop Embarrassing Me!	Sitcom	April 14, 2021		1 season, 8 episodes	25–27 min	
Scaredy Cats	Fantasy comedy	October 1, 2021		1 season, 9 episodes	24–46 min	
Super PupZ	Children's comedy	March 31, 2022		1 season, 9 episodes	25–47 min	
The Last Bus	Science fiction	April 1, 2022		1 season, 10 episodes	30–40 min	
Heartstopper	Teen drama	April 22, 2022	October 3, 2024	3 seasons, 24 episodes	26–40 min	
Man vs. Bee	Comedy	June 24, 2022		1 season, 9 episodes	10–19 min	
Gymnastics Academy: A Second Chance!	Family drama	September 16, 2022		1 season, 10 episodes	24–27 min	
Phantom Pups	Children's comedy	September 30, 2022		1 season, 10 episodes	21–28 min	
Waffles + Mochi's Restaurant	Cooking/Educational	October 17, 2022		1 season, 6 episodes	20 min	
Blippi's Job Show	Educational	April 7, 2025	September 22, 2025	2 seasons, 20 episodes	17–21 min	

== Animation ==
=== Adult animation ===
Title	Genre	Premiere	Finale	Seasons	Runtime	Language	Notes
Masameer County	Comedy	July 1, 2021	March 2, 2023	2 seasons, 14 episodes	11–38 min	Arabic	
Masters of the Universe: Revelation	Science fantasy	July 23, 2021	November 23, 2021	2 parts, 10 episodes	22–32 min	English	
Q-Force	Comedy	September 2, 2021		1 season, 10 episodes	26 min	English	
Chicago Party Aunt	Comedy	September 17, 2021	December 30, 2022	2 parts, 16 episodes	22–28 min	English	
Adventure Beast	Educational/comedy	October 22, 2021		1 season, 12 episodes	16–20 min	English	
Inside Job	Workplace comedy/Science fiction	October 22, 2021	November 18, 2022	2 parts, 18 episodes	26–31 min	English	
Tear Along the Dotted Line	Comedy	November 17, 2021		6 episodes	16–22 min	Italian	
Saturday Morning All Star Hits!	Comedy	December 10, 2021		1 season, 8 episodes	19–28 min	English	
The Guardians of Justice	Superhero live-action animation	March 1, 2022		1 season, 7 episodes	21–36 min	English	
Human Resources	Comedy	March 18, 2022	June 9, 2023	2 seasons, 20 episodes	25–28 min	English	
Farzar	Science fiction comedy	July 15, 2022		1 season, 10 episodes	25–29 min	English	
Agent Elvis	Spy comedy	March 17, 2023		1 season, 10 episodes	23–26 min	English	
Mulligan	Science fiction comedy	May 12, 2023	May 24, 2024	2 parts, 20 episodes	25–27 min	English	
This World Can't Tear Me Down	Comedy	June 9, 2023		6 episodes	24–34 min	Italian	
Skull Island	Adventure	June 22, 2023		1 season, 8 episodes	19–25 min	English	
Captain Fall	Comedy	July 28, 2023		1 season, 10 episodes	26–27 min	English	
Carol & the End of the World	Comedy drama	December 15, 2023		10 episodes	25–33 min	English	
Masters of the Universe: Revolution	Action-adventure	January 25, 2024		1 season, 5 episodes	24–27 min	English	
Good Times	Sitcom	April 12, 2024		1 season, 10 episodes	24–27 min	English	
Exploding Kittens	Comedy	July 12, 2024		1 season, 9 episodes	24–27 min	English	
Twilight of the Gods	Fantasy	September 19, 2024		1 season, 8 episodes	27–42 min	English	
Tomb Raider: The Legend of Lara Croft	Action-adventure	October 10, 2024	December 11, 2025	2 seasons, 16 episodes	22–35 min	English	
Kurukshetra: The Great War of Mahabharata	Epic mythology action adventure	October 10, 2025	October 24, 2025	1 season, 18 episodes	27–31 min	Hindi	

=== Anime ===
Title	Genre	Premiere	Finale	Seasons	Runtime	Language	Notes
High-Rise Invasion	Action horror	February 25, 2021		1 season, 12 episodes	25–27 min	Japanese	
Pacific Rim: The Black	Mecha/Kaiju	March 4, 2021	April 19, 2022	2 seasons, 14 episodes	20–29 min	English	
Dota: Dragon's Blood	Dark fantasy action	March 25, 2021	August 11, 2022	3 books, 24 episodes	24–28 min	English	
The Way of the Househusband	Comedy	April 8, 2021	January 1, 2023	2 seasons, 15 episodes	16–19 min	Japanese	
Yasuke	Historical fantasy/Action	April 29, 2021		1 season, 6 episodes	28–30 min	English	
Eden	Science fiction	May 27, 2021		1 season, 4 episodes	25 min	Japanese	
Trese	Dark fantasy/Crime	June 10, 2021		1 season, 6 episodes	25–33 min	English	
Resident Evil: Infinite Darkness	Horror	July 8, 2021		1 season, 4 episodes	25–28 min	English	
Transformers: War for Cybertron Trilogy: Kingdom	Science fiction	July 29, 2021		1 season, 6 episodes	24–26 min	English	
Baki Hanma	Martial arts	September 30, 2021	August 24, 2023	2 seasons, 39 episodes	24–25 min	Japanese	
Super Crooks	Crime	November 25, 2021		1 season, 13 episodes	20–29 min	Japanese	
The Orbital Children	Science fiction adventure	January 28, 2022		1 season, 6 episodes	30–38 min	Japanese	
Kotaro Lives Alone	Comedy	March 10, 2022		1 season, 10 episodes	26–27 min	Japanese	
Thermae Romae Novae	Comedy	March 28, 2022		1 season, 11 episodes	25–36 min	Japanese	
Vampire in the Garden	Action drama	May 16, 2022		1 season, 5 episodes	24–30 min	Japanese	
Spriggan	Science fiction	June 18, 2022		1 season, 6 episodes	43–46 min	Japanese	
Bastard!! -Heavy Metal, Dark Fantasy-	Dark fantasy	June 30, 2022	July 31, 2023	2 seasons, 39 episodes	23–25 min	Japanese	
Kakegurui Twin	Drama	August 4, 2022		1 season, 6 episodes	25–28 min	Japanese	
Tekken: Bloodline	Martial arts	August 18, 2022		1 season, 6 episodes	22–29 min	English	
Rilakkuma's Theme Park Adventure	Slice of life	August 25, 2022		1 season, 8 episodes	12–20 min	Japanese	
Bee and PuppyCat	Fantasy comedy drama	September 6, 2022		1 season, 16 episodes	25–28 min	English	
Exception	Horror	October 13, 2022		1 season, 8 episodes	24–45 min	English	
Romantic Killer	Romantic comedy	October 27, 2022		1 season, 12 episodes	23–30 min	Japanese	
Lookism	Coming-of-age fantasy drama	December 8, 2022		1 season, 8 episodes	22–30 min	Korean	
Dragon Age: Absolution	Fantasy	December 9, 2022		1 season, 6 episodes	25–27 min	English	
Gudetama: An Eggcellent Adventure	Fantasy hybrid animation	December 13, 2022		1 season, 10 episodes	9–16 min	Japanese	
Junji Ito Maniac: Japanese Tales of the Macabre	Horror anthology	January 19, 2023		1 season, 12 episodes	24–25 min	Japanese	
Make My Day	Science fiction	February 2, 2023		1 season, 8 episodes	23–29 min	Japanese	
Yakitori: Soldiers of Misfortune	Science fiction	May 18, 2023		1 season, 6 episodes	27–45 min	Japanese	
Ōoku: The Inner Chambers	Historical drama	June 29, 2023		1 season, 10 episodes	25–79 min	Japanese	
Gamera Rebirth	Kaiju science fiction	September 7, 2023		1 season, 6 episodes	43–47 min	Japanese	
Castlevania: Nocturne	Dark fantasy	September 28, 2023	January 16, 2025	2 seasons, 16 episodes	24–33 min	English	
Good Night World	Fantasy	October 12, 2023		1 season, 12 episodes	24–30 min	Japanese	
Captain Laserhawk: A Blood Dragon Remix	Science fiction	October 19, 2023		1 season, 6 episodes	20–25 min	English	
Pluto	Science fiction	October 26, 2023		1 season, 8 episodes	56–71 min	Japanese	
Onimusha	Action-adventure	November 2, 2023		1 season, 8 episodes	22–36 min	Japanese	
Akuma-kun	Fantasy	November 9, 2023		1 season, 12 episodes	21–28 min	Japanese	
Scott Pilgrim Takes Off	Fantasy romantic comedy	November 17, 2023		1 season, 8 episodes	26–29 min	English	
My Daemon	Fantasy adventure	November 23, 2023		1 season, 13 episodes	23–31 min	Japanese	
Onmyōji	Historical fantasy	November 28, 2023		1 season, 13 episodes	25–27 min	Japanese	
Pokémon Concierge	Stop-motion fantasy	December 28, 2023	September 4, 2025	1 season, 8 episodes	14–22 min	Japanese	
The Grimm Variations	Dark fantasy anthology	April 17, 2024		1 season, 6 episodes	32–46 min	Japanese	
T・P BON	Science fiction	May 2, 2024	July 17, 2024	2 seasons, 24 episodes	26–33 min	Japanese	
Garouden: The Way of the Lone Wolf	Martial arts	May 23, 2024		1 season, 8 episodes	23–28 min	Japanese	
Rising Impact	Sports	June 22, 2024	August 6, 2024	2 seasons, 26 episodes	22–28 min	Japanese	
Terminator Zero	Science fiction	August 29, 2024		1 season, 8 episodes	25–29 min	Japanese	
Gundam: Requiem for Vengeance	Mecha/Military science fiction	October 17, 2024		1 season, 6 episodes	23–24 min	English	
Tokyo Override	Science fiction	November 21, 2024		1 season, 6 episodes	24–28 min	Japanese	
Moonrise	Science fiction	April 10, 2025		1 season, 18 episodes	21–31 min	Japanese	
Leviathan	Alternate history	July 10, 2025		1 season, 12 episodes	22–29 min	Japanese	
My Melody & Kuromi	Comedy	July 24, 2025		1 season, 12 episodes	11–17 min	Japanese	

=== Kids & family ===
Title	Premiere	Finale	Seasons	Runtime	Language	Notes
Go, Dog. Go!	January 26, 2021	November 27, 2023	4 seasons, 40 episodes	24 min	English	
Kid Cosmic	February 2, 2021	February 3, 2022	3 seasons, 24 episodes	17–28 min	English	
Kayko and Kokosh	February 28, 2021	November 17, 2021	2 seasons, 14 episodes	14–16 min	Polish	
City of Ghosts	March 5, 2021		1 season, 6 episodes	18–20 min	English	
We the People	July 4, 2021		10 episodes	4–5 min	English	
Ridley Jones	July 13, 2021	March 6, 2023	5 seasons, 35 episodes	10–50 min	English	
Johnny Test	July 16, 2021	January 7, 2022	2 seasons, 40 episodes	13–14 min	English	
Centaurworld	July 30, 2021	December 7, 2021	2 seasons, 18 episodes	25–73 min	English	
Oggy Oggy	August 24, 2021	October 16, 2023	3 seasons, 52 episodes	22 min	No dialogue	
I Heart Arlo	August 27, 2021		1 season, 19 episodes	14–25 min	English	
Sharkdog	September 3, 2021	April 27, 2023	3 seasons, 21 episodes	14–24 min	English	
Octonauts: Above & Beyond	September 7, 2021	May 2, 2022	2 seasons, 26 episodes	25 min	English	
He-Man and the Masters of the Universe	September 16, 2021	August 18, 2022	3 seasons, 26 episodes	25–28 min	English	
Ada Twist, Scientist	September 28, 2021	April 22, 2023	4 seasons, 41 episodes	15–29 min	English	
A Tale Dark & Grimm	October 8, 2021		10 episodes	27–30 min	English	
Karma's World	October 15, 2021	September 22, 2022	4 seasons, 40 episodes	12–13 min	English	
Maya and the Three	October 22, 2021		9 episodes	26–44 min	English	
StoryBots: Laugh, Learn, Sing	November 16, 2021	July 18, 2022	2 collections, 4 episodes	10–59 min	English	
Dogs in Space	November 18, 2021	September 15, 2022	2 seasons, 20 episodes	20–26 min	English	
Word Party Presents: Math!	December 28, 2021		1 season, 10 episodes	26 min	English	
Action Pack	January 4, 2022	June 6, 2022	2 seasons, 16 episodes	27–29 min	English	
Angry Birds: Summer Madness	January 28, 2022	August 25, 2022	3 seasons, 36 episodes	13–24 min	English	
The Cuphead Show!	February 18, 2022	November 18, 2022	3 seasons, 36 episodes	11–30 min	English	
Team Zenko Go	March 15, 2022	August 8, 2022	2 seasons, 22 episodes	23–24 min	English	
Trivia Quest	April 1, 2022	April 30, 2022	1 season, 30 episodes	9 min	English	
Battle Kitty	April 19, 2022		1 season, 9 episodes	22–54 min	English	
Samurai Rabbit: The Usagi Chronicles	April 28, 2022	September 1, 2022	2 seasons, 20 episodes	21–26 min	English	
The Boss Baby: Back in the Crib	May 19, 2022	April 13, 2023	2 seasons, 28 episodes	24 min	English	
Sea of Love	May 23, 2022		1 season, 15 episodes	10–11 min	English	
My Little Pony: Make Your Mark	May 26, 2022	November 23, 2023	6 chapters, 27 episodes	23–45 min	English	
Dead End: Paranormal Park	June 16, 2022	October 13, 2022	2 seasons, 20 episodes	25–31 min	English	
Kung Fu Panda: The Dragon Knight	July 14, 2022	September 7, 2023	3 seasons, 42 episodes	23–45 min	English	
Big Tree City	August 1, 2022		1 season, 15 episodes	20–24 min	English	
Super Giant Robot Brothers	August 4, 2022		1 season, 10 episodes	21–26 min	English	
Deepa & Anoop	August 15, 2022	November 7, 2022	2 seasons, 18 episodes	20–25 min	English	
Oddballs	October 7, 2022	February 24, 2023	2 seasons, 20 episodes	17–20 min	English	
Spirit Rangers	October 10, 2022	April 8, 2024	3 seasons, 39 episodes	16–29 min	English	
Oni: Thunder God's Tale	October 21, 2022		4 episodes	38–44 min	English	
Daniel Spellbound	October 27, 2022	January 26, 2023	2 seasons, 20 episodes	22–26 min	English	
StoryBots: Answer Time	November 21, 2022	July 10, 2023	2 seasons, 22 episodes	18–23 min	English	
Sonic Prime	December 15, 2022	January 11, 2024	3 seasons, 23 episodes	21–43 min	English	
Brown and Friends	December 29, 2022		1 season, 18 episodes	12–15 min	No dialogue	
Princess Power	January 30, 2023	May 20, 2024	3 seasons, 45 episodes	14–34 min	English	
My Dad the Bounty Hunter	February 9, 2023	August 17, 2023	2 seasons, 19 episodes	19–44 min	English	
Larva Family	May 4, 2023		1 season, 9 episodes	14–20 min	English	
Kitti Katz	May 18, 2023		1 season, 10 episodes	23–28 min	English	
Not Quite Narwhal	June 19, 2023	January 22, 2024	2 seasons, 39 episodes	13–24 min	English	
Supa Team 4	July 20, 2023	December 21, 2023	2 seasons, 16 episodes	26–30 min	English	
Dew Drop Diaries	July 24, 2023	December 4, 2023	2 seasons, 40 episodes	13–30 min	English	
Mech Cadets	August 10, 2023		1 season, 10 episodes	20–30 min	English	
Little Baby Bum: Music Time	September 25, 2023	June 3, 2024	2 seasons, 18 episodes	23–42 min	English	
Unicorn Academy	November 2, 2023	November 13, 2025	4 chapters, 21 episodes	24–75 min	English	
Mighty Bheem's Playtime	January 29, 2024		1 season, 10 episodes	14–15 min	No dialogue	
Dee & Friends in Oz	February 5, 2024		2 parts, 17 episodes	25–47 min	English	
Hot Wheels Let's Race	March 4, 2024	March 3, 2025	3 seasons, 20 episodes	23–24 min	English	
Jurassic World: Chaos Theory	May 24, 2024	November 20, 2025	4 seasons, 39 episodes	21–25 min	English	
Wonderoos	July 15, 2024	November 18, 2024	2 seasons, 39 episodes	14–26 min	English	
Mighty MonsterWheelies	October 14, 2024	May 5, 2025	2 seasons, 52 episodes	12–13 min	English	
Barbie Mysteries	November 1, 2024	August 28, 2025	2 seasons, 16 episodes	21–26 min	English	
Jentry Chau vs. the Underworld	December 5, 2024		1 season, 13 episodes	26–32 min	English	
Dog Days Out	February 13, 2025		1 season, 8 episodes	15–16 min	No dialogue	
Wolf King	March 20, 2025	September 11, 2025	2 seasons, 16 episodes	22–32 min	English	
Asterix and Obelix: The Big Fight	April 30, 2025		5 episodes	32–43 min	French	
7 Bears	July 10, 2025		10 episodes	26–28 min	English	

== Non-English language scripted ==
=== Arabic ===
Title	Genre	Premiere	Finale	Seasons	Runtime	Notes
Abla Fahita: Drama Queen	Puppetry/live-action comedy	March 15, 2021		1 season, 6 episodes	17–24 min	
AlRawabi School for Girls	Drama	August 12, 2021	February 15, 2024	2 seasons, 12 episodes	44–71 min	
Finding Ola	Comedy drama	February 3, 2022	September 26, 2024	2 seasons, 12 episodes	39–66 min	
Love, Life & Everything in Between	Romantic comedy	March 10, 2022		1 season, 8 episodes	19–36 min	
The Cage	Comedy drama	October 11, 2022		1 season, 8 episodes	33–40 min	
The Exchange	Drama	February 8, 2023	February 13, 2025	2 seasons, 12 episodes	46–57 min	
Devil's Advocate	Drama	July 13, 2023		7 episodes	32–42 min	
Tahir's House	Comedy drama	September 6, 2023		1 season, 6 episodes	27–35 min	
Hard Broken	Drama	September 20, 2023		6 episodes	39–55 min	
Crashing Eid	Comedy drama	November 15, 2023		1 season, 4 episodes	46–48 min	
Echoes of the Past	Crime drama	December 6, 2024		1 season, 8 episodes	34–42 min	
Franklin	Crime drama	May 15, 2025		1 season, 6 episodes	40–50 min	
Catalog	Comedy drama	July 17, 2025		1 season, 8 episodes	50–64 min	

=== Danish ===
Title	Genre	Premiere	Finale	Seasons	Runtime	Notes
Elves	Fantasy horror	November 28, 2021		1 season, 6 episodes	20–26 min	
Chosen	Coming-of-age science fiction	January 27, 2022		1 season, 6 episodes	41–49 min	
Baby Fever	Romantic comedy drama	June 8, 2022	August 22, 2024	2 seasons, 12 episodes	27–35 min	
Copenhagen Cowboy	Drama	January 5, 2023		1 season, 6 episodes	46–56 min	
The Nurse	Thriller	April 27, 2023		4 episodes	43–54 min	
Secrets We Keep	Crime drama	May 15, 2025		6 episodes	33–42 min	

=== Dutch ===
Title	Genre	Premiere	Finale	Seasons	Runtime	Notes
Misfit: The Series	Teen musical comedy-drama	October 16, 2021		1 season, 8 episodes	22–28 min	
Dirty Lines	Drama	April 8, 2022		1 season, 6 episodes	43–51 min	
Ferry: The Series	Crime drama	November 3, 2023		1 season, 8 episodes	36–51 min	
Amsterdam Empire	Crime drama	October 30, 2025		1 season, 7 episodes	40–52 min	

=== French ===
Title	Genre	Premiere	Finale	Seasons	Runtime	Notes
Dealer	Drama	March 10, 2021		1 season, 10 episodes	8–15 min	
Gone for Good	Thriller	August 13, 2021		5 episodes	44–53 min	
Ganglands	Thriller	September 24, 2021	February 17, 2023	2 seasons, 12 episodes	40–51 min	
Christmas Flow	Romantic comedy/Musical	November 17, 2021		1 season, 3 episodes	47–54 min	
Standing Up	Comedy drama	March 18, 2022		1 season, 6 episodes	40–49 min	
The 7 Lives of Lea	Supernatural drama	April 28, 2022		7 episodes	41–52 min	
Off the Hook	Comedy	September 1, 2022		1 season, 6 episodes	31–35 min	
Notre-Dame	Drama	October 19, 2022		6 episodes	42–54 min	
Represent	Comedy	January 20, 2023	August 29, 2024	2 seasons, 12 episodes	26–34 min	
Thicker Than Water	Drama	April 7, 2023		1 season, 8 episodes	30–38 min	
Class Act	Biopic	September 13, 2023		7 episodes	43–64 min	
Anthracite	Crime drama	April 10, 2024		6 episodes	45–52 min	
Fiasco	Comedy	April 30, 2024		7 episodes	32–40 min	
Shafted	Comedy	January 24, 2025		1 season, 6 episodes	31–40 min	
Under a Dark Sun	Thriller	July 9, 2025		1 season, 6 episodes	41–57 min	
Young Millionaires	Comedy	August 13, 2025		1 season, 8 episodes	30–35 min	
Néro the Assassin	Historical drama	October 8, 2025		1 season, 8 episodes	46–57 min	

=== German ===
Title	Genre	Premiere	Finale	Seasons	Runtime	Notes
Tribes of Europa	Science fiction	February 19, 2021		1 season, 6 episodes	44–49 min	
The Billion Dollar Code	Legal thriller	October 7, 2021		4 episodes	58–77 min	
Life's a Glitch	Science fiction comedy drama	October 21, 2021		1 season, 4 episodes	32–36 min	
Kitz	Young adult mystery drama	December 30, 2021		1 season, 6 episodes	41–45 min	
King of Stonks	Comedy drama	July 6, 2022		1 season, 6 episodes	45–49 min	
Kleo	Thriller	August 19, 2022	July 25, 2024	2 seasons, 14 episodes	41–56 min	
The Empress	Historical drama	September 29, 2022	November 12, 2026	3 seasons, 18 episodes	47–68 min	
Sleeping Dog	Crime drama	June 22, 2023		6 episodes	47–54 min	
Dear Child	Psychological thriller	September 7, 2023		6 episodes	45–50 min	
The Signal	Science fiction thriller	March 7, 2024		4 episodes	55–69 min	
Cassandra	Science fiction thriller	February 6, 2025		6 episodes	45–52 min	

=== Hindi ===
Title	Genre	Premiere	Finale	Seasons	Runtime	Notes
Bombay Begums	Drama	March 8, 2021		1 season, 6 episodes	38–60 min	
Ray	Drama anthology	June 25, 2021		4 episodes	52–64 min	
Feels Like Ishq	Romantic comedy anthology	July 23, 2021		6 episodes	25–31 min	
Call My Agent: Bollywood	Workplace dramedy	October 29, 2021		1 season, 6 episodes	39–49 min	
Aranyak	Crime thriller	December 10, 2021		1 season, 8 episodes	37–48 min	
The Fame Game	Suspense family drama	February 25, 2022		1 season, 8 episodes	43–54 min	
Mai: A Mother's Rage	Crime thriller	April 15, 2022		1 season, 6 episodes	42–54 min	
Khakee: The Bihar Chapter	Crime thriller	November 25, 2022		1 season, 7 episodes	41–68 min	
Trial by Fire	Crime drama	January 13, 2023		7 episodes	44–47 min	
Class	Teen crime thriller	February 3, 2023		1 season, 8 episodes	47–58 min	
Rana Naidu	Crime drama	March 10, 2023	June 13, 2025	2 seasons, 18 episodes	31–53 min	
Tooth Pari: When Love Bites	Romantic horror comedy	April 20, 2023		8 episodes	30–47 min	
Scoop	True crime drama	June 2, 2023		1 season, 6 episodes	52–71 min	
Choona	Dark crime comedy	September 29, 2023		8 episodes	34–52 min	
Kaala Paani	Thriller drama	October 18, 2023		1 season, 7 episodes	57–70 min	
The Railway Men – The Untold Story of Bhopal 1984	Thriller	November 18, 2023		4 episodes	51–65 min	
Killer Soup	Dark comedy/Crime thriller	January 11, 2024		1 season, 8 episodes	43–59 min	
Tribhuvan Mishra CA Topper	Dark comedy	July 18, 2024		1 season, 9 episodes	44–67 min	
IC 814: The Kandahar Hijack	Thriller	August 29, 2024		6 episodes	28–46 min	
Dabba Cartel	Crime thriller	February 28, 2025		1 season, 7 episodes	42–63 min	
Khakee: The Bengal Chapter	Crime thriller	March 20, 2025		1 season, 7 episodes	37–62 min	
Mandala Murders	Crime drama	July 25, 2025		1 season, 8 episodes	32–49 min	
Saare Jahan Se Accha: The Silent Guardians	Crime drama	August 13, 2025		1 season, 6 episodes	31–46 min	
The Ba***ds of Bollywood	Comedy drama	September 18, 2025		1 season, 7 episodes	39–56 min	

=== Indonesian ===
Title	Genre	Premiere	Finale	Seasons	Runtime	Notes
Ex-Addicts Club	Slice of life sitcom	April 20, 2023		1 season, 10 episodes	21–24 min	
Cigarette Girl	Historical drama	November 2, 2023		1 season, 5 episodes	58–74 min	
Comedy Chaos	Sitcom	February 16, 2024		1 season, 10 episodes	27–34 min	
Joko Anwar's Nightmares and Daydreams	Science fiction horror anthology	June 14, 2024		1 season, 7 episodes	46–62 min	
Losmen Bu Broto: The Series	Family drama	May 29, 2025		1 season, 8 episodes	33–44 min	
Ratu Ratu Queens: The Series	Comedy drama	September 12, 2025		1 season, 6 episodes	37–51 min	

=== Italian ===
Title	Genre	Premiere	Finale	Seasons	Runtime	Notes
Zero	Superhero	April 21, 2021		1 season, 8 episodes	21–27 min	
Generation 56K	Romantic comedy	July 1, 2021		1 season, 8 episodes	26–33 min	
Luna Park	Drama	September 30, 2021		1 season, 6 episodes	44–54 min	
An Astrological Guide for Broken Hearts	Romantic comedy	October 27, 2021	March 8, 2022	2 seasons, 12 episodes	30–38 min	
Framed! A Sicilian Murder Mystery	Comedy	January 1, 2022	March 2, 2023	2 seasons, 12 episodes	26–40 min	
Devotion, a Story of Love and Desire	Romantic drama	February 14, 2022		1 season, 6 episodes	38–45 min	
Di4ries	Coming-of-age	May 18, 2022	December 6, 2023	2 seasons, 29 episodes	24–52 min	
Everything Calls for Salvation	Drama	October 14, 2022	September 26, 2024	2 seasons, 12 episodes	42–51 min	
I Hate Christmas	Comedy	December 7, 2022	December 7, 2023	2 seasons, 12 episodes	28–39 min	
The Lying Life of Adults	Drama	January 4, 2023		6 episodes	40–60 min	
The Law According to Lidia Poët	Period legal drama	February 15, 2023	April 15, 2026	3 seasons, 18 episodes	44–57 min	
Suburræterna	Crime drama	November 14, 2023		1 season, 8 episodes	40–49 min	
Supersex	Biopic	March 6, 2024		7 episodes	42–55 min	
Brigands: The Quest for Gold	Historical drama	April 23, 2024		1 season, 6 episodes	39–58 min	
The Life You Wanted	Drama	May 29, 2024		6 episodes	47–50 min	
Deceitful Love	Romantic drama	October 9, 2024		6 episodes	46–52 min	
Adoration	Coming of age drama	November 20, 2024		6 episodes	41–51 min	
Public Disorder	Crime drama	January 15, 2025		1 season, 6 episodes	42–61 min	
The Leopard	Period drama	March 5, 2025		6 episodes	51–60 min	
Sara: Woman in the Shadows	Crime drama	June 3, 2025		1 season, 6 episodes	49–58 min	
Riv4lries	Teen drama	October 1, 2025		1 season, 14 episodes	35 min	
Mrs Playmen	Biopic	November 12, 2025		7 episodes	45–59 min	
Sicily Express	Comedy	December 5, 2025		5 episodes	27–42 min	

=== Japanese ===
Title	Genre	Premiere	Finale	Seasons	Runtime	Notes
Creator's File: Gold	Mockumentary	June 3, 2021		1 season, 8 episodes	15–31 min	
The Journalist	Drama	January 13, 2022		1 season, 6 episodes	45–58 min	
Fishbowl Wives	Romantic drama	February 14, 2022		1 season, 8 episodes	38–51 min	
First Love	Romantic drama	November 24, 2022		9 episodes	49–65 min	
The Makanai: Cooking for the Maiko House	Drama	January 12, 2023		1 season, 9 episodes	38–46 min	
Sanctuary	Sports drama	May 4, 2023		1 season, 8 episodes	31–64 min	
The Days	Drama	June 1, 2023		8 episodes	46–66 min	
Burn the House Down	Mystery thriller	July 13, 2023		1 season, 8 episodes	41–54 min	
House of Ninjas	Action thriller	February 15, 2024		1 season, 8 episodes	51–55 min	
Chastity High	Teen drama	August 29, 2024		1 season, 8 episodes	44–54 min	
The Queen of Villains	Sports drama	September 19, 2024		1 season, 5 episodes	60–82 min	
Beyond Goodbye	Romantic drama	November 14, 2024		8 episodes	38–53 min	
Asura	Family drama	January 9, 2025		1 season, 7 episodes	55–66 min	
Glass Heart	Music drama	July 31, 2025		1 season, 10 episodes	33–54 min	
Romantics Anonymous	Romantic comedy	October 16, 2025		1 season, 8 episodes	39–57 min	

=== Korean ===
Title	Genre	Premiere	Finale	Seasons	Runtime	Notes
Move to Heaven	Melodrama	May 14, 2021		1 season, 10 episodes	43–61 min	
So Not Worth It	Sitcom	June 18, 2021		1 season, 12 episodes	30–34 min	
D.P.	Military drama	August 27, 2021	July 28, 2023	2 seasons, 12 episodes	41–64 min	
Squid Game	Survival thriller	September 17, 2021	June 27, 2025	3 seasons, 22 episodes	32–76 min	
My Name	Crime thriller	October 15, 2021		1 season, 8 episodes	45–58 min	
Hellbound	Supernatural thriller	November 19, 2021	October 25, 2024	2 seasons, 12 episodes	41–60 min	
The Silent Sea	Science fiction thriller	December 24, 2021		1 season, 8 episodes	39–51 min	
Juvenile Justice	Legal drama	February 25, 2022		1 season, 10 episodes	54–69 min	
The Sound of Magic	Musical/Romantic fantasy	May 6, 2022		6 episodes	62–77 min	
Money Heist: Korea – Joint Economic Area	Heist crime drama	June 24, 2022	December 9, 2022	1 season, 12 episodes	63–78 min	
Remarriage & Desires	Melodrama	July 15, 2022		1 season, 8 episodes	55–71 min	
A Model Family	Crime thriller	August 12, 2022		1 season, 10 episodes	41–50 min	
Narco-Saints	Crime drama	September 9, 2022		1 season, 6 episodes	51–68 min	
Glitch	Comedy thriller	October 7, 2022		10 episodes	42–66 min	
Somebody	Suspense thriller	November 18, 2022		1 season, 8 episodes	49–71 min	
The Fabulous	Romantic comedy	December 23, 2022		1 season, 8 episodes	44–66 min	
The Glory	Revenge drama	December 30, 2022	March 10, 2023	1 season, 16 episodes	47–71 min	
Love to Hate You	Romantic comedy	February 10, 2023		1 season, 10 episodes	44–63 min	
Queenmaker	Political drama	April 14, 2023		1 season, 11 episodes	62–74 min	
Black Knight	Dystopian action thriller	May 12, 2023		1 season, 6 episodes	44–51 min	
Celebrity	Social thriller	June 30, 2023		12 episodes	37–53 min	
Mask Girl	Dark comedy thriller	August 18, 2023		7 episodes	50–64 min	
A Time Called You	Romantic fantasy	September 8, 2023		12 episodes	46–75 min	
Song of the Bandits	Period action drama	September 22, 2023		1 season, 9 episodes	48–69 min	
Doona!	Coming-of-age romantic drama	October 20, 2023		1 season, 9 episodes	42–49 min	
Daily Dose of Sunshine	Medical comedy drama	November 3, 2023		1 season, 12 episodes	52–72 min	
Gyeongseong Creature	Historical thriller	December 22, 2023	September 27, 2024	2 seasons, 17 episodes	43–78 min	
The Bequeathed	Occult thriller suspense	January 19, 2024		6 episodes	39–56 min	
A Killer Paradox	Crime thriller dark comedy	February 9, 2024		1 season, 8 episodes	45–63 min	
Chicken Nugget	Comedic mystery	March 15, 2024		10 episodes	28–36 min	
Parasyte: The Grey	Science fiction horror	April 5, 2024		6 episodes	42–61 min	
Goodbye Earth	Science fiction	April 26, 2024		12 episodes	48–65 min	
The 8 Show	Dark comedy thriller	May 17, 2024		8 episodes	46–68 min	
Hierarchy	Teen drama	June 7, 2024		7 episodes	58–75 min	
The Whirlwind	Political drama	June 28, 2024		12 episodes	38–55 min	
The Frog	Mystery crime thriller	August 23, 2024		8 episodes	49–68 min	
Mr. Plankton	Romantic comedy	November 8, 2024		10 episodes	57–77 min	
The Trunk	Mystery melodrama	November 29, 2024		8 episodes	59–72 min	
Melo Movie	Romantic comedy	February 14, 2025		10 episodes	57–74 min	
When Life Gives You Tangerines	Slice of life romantic drama	March 7, 2025	March 28, 2025	16 episodes	49–85 min	
Karma	Crime thriller	April 4, 2025		6 episodes	47–61 min	
Dear Hongrang	Period drama	May 16, 2025		1 season, 11 episodes	50–67 min	
Mercy for None	Action noir	June 6, 2025		7 episodes	37–49 min	
Trigger	Action thriller	July 25, 2025		10 episodes	37–61 min	
Aema	Historical comedy drama	August 22, 2025		6 episodes	47–68 min	
You and Everything Else	Drama	September 12, 2025		15 episodes	45–69 min	
Genie, Make a Wish	Romantic fantasy comedy	October 3, 2025		1 season, 13 episodes	54–62 min	
As You Stood By	Crime drama	November 7, 2025		8 episodes	56–71 min	
Cashero	Superhero	December 26, 2025		8 episodes	47–61 min	

=== Mandarin ===
Title	Genre	Premiere	Finale	Seasons	Runtime	Notes
More Than Blue: The Series	Romantic drama	October 22, 2021		1 season, 10 episodes	42–50 min	
Light the Night	Suspense thriller/Melodrama	November 26, 2021	March 18, 2022	3 parts, 24 episodes	44–55 min	
Mom, Don't Do That!	Romantic dramedy	July 15, 2022		1 season, 11 episodes	43–67 min	
Shards of Her	Suspense thriller	October 28, 2022		1 season, 9 episodes	45–51 min	
Copycat Killer	Crime drama	March 31, 2023		1 season, 10 episodes	51–70 min	
At the Moment	Romantic drama/anthology	November 10, 2023		1 season, 10 episodes	46–58 min	
Let's Talk About Chu	Romantic comedy	February 2, 2024		1 season, 8 episodes	43–58 min	
GG Precinct	Crime comedy	August 22, 2024		1 season, 6 episodes	38–50 min	
Born for the Spotlight	Drama	November 7, 2024		1 season, 12 episodes	42–59 min	
I Am Married...But!	Romantic comedy	February 14, 2025		1 season, 12 episodes	29–49 min	
Forget You Not	Slice-of-life comedy drama	May 23, 2025		1 season, 8 episodes	41–60 min	
The Resurrected	Revenge crime thriller	October 9, 2025		1 season, 9 episodes	46–69 min	

=== Norwegian ===
Title	Genre	Premiere	Finale	Seasons	Runtime	Notes
Post Mortem: No One Dies in Skarnes	Supernatural drama	August 25, 2021		1 season, 6 episodes	43–47 min	
The Lørenskog Disappearance	Crime drama	September 14, 2022		5 episodes	50–52 min	
A Storm for Christmas	Comedy drama	December 16, 2022		6 episodes	28–38 min	
Midsummer Night	Drama	April 11, 2024		5 episodes	27–33 min	
Billionaire Island	Drama	September 12, 2024		1 season, 6 episodes	44–47 min	
La Palma	Drama	December 12, 2024		4 episodes	39–50 min	

=== Polish ===
Title	Genre	Premiere	Finale	Seasons	Runtime	Notes
Sexify	Comedy drama	April 28, 2021	January 11, 2023	2 seasons, 16 episodes	32–51 min	
Open Your Eyes	Thriller	August 25, 2021		1 season, 6 episodes	42–54 min	
Cracow Monsters	Fantasy drama	March 18, 2022		1 season, 8 episodes	49–55 min	
Hold Tight	Thriller	April 22, 2022		6 episodes	41–53 min	
Queen	Drama	June 23, 2022		1 season, 4 episodes	46–54 min	
Family Secrets	Comedy	August 31, 2022		1 season, 8 episodes	41–52 min	
High Water	Drama	October 5, 2022		1 season, 6 episodes	42–46 min	
The Green Glove Gang	Dark comedy	October 19, 2022	July 17, 2024	2 seasons, 16 episodes	28–38 min	
Dead End	Dark comedy	December 1, 2022		1 season, 6 episodes	25–30 min	
Glitter	Drama	December 14, 2022		1 season, 10 episodes	28–35 min	
A Girl and an Astronaut	Drama	February 17, 2023		1 season, 6 episodes	44–51 min	
Infamy	Drama	September 6, 2023		1 season, 8 episodes	44–52 min	
Absolute Beginners	Romantic drama	October 25, 2023		1 season, 6 episodes	45–47 min	
Feedback	Drama	November 15, 2023		1 season, 5 episodes	43–55 min	
Detective Forst	Crime drama	January 11, 2024		1 season, 6 episodes	41–45 min	
Hound's Hill	Thriller	January 8, 2025		5 episodes	60–65 min	
The Hooligan	Drama	January 29, 2025		1 season, 5 episodes	44–46 min	
Just One Look	Mystery	March 5, 2025		6 episodes	41–52 min	
Project UFO	Drama	April 16, 2025		4 episodes	48–55 min	
Aniela	Comedy	June 11, 2025		1 season, 8 episodes	40–51 min	
Heweliusz	Drama	November 5, 2025		5 episodes	49–81 min	

=== Portuguese ===
Title	Genre	Premiere	Finale	Seasons	Runtime	Notes
Invisible City	Fantasy thriller	February 5, 2021	March 22, 2023	2 seasons, 12 episodes	31–51 min	
Glória	Thriller	November 5, 2021		1 season, 10 episodes	40–47 min	
Summer Heat	Drama	January 21, 2022		1 season, 8 episodes	42–52 min	
Back to 15	Comedy	February 25, 2022	August 21, 2024	3 seasons, 18 episodes	34–44 min	
Smother-in-Law	Sitcom	April 13, 2022	April 12, 2023	2 seasons, 20 episodes	23–26 min	
Maldivas	Comedy drama	June 15, 2022		1 season, 7 episodes	29–43 min	
Unsuspicious	Comedy	August 17, 2022		1 season, 9 episodes	26–34 min	
Only for Love	Musical drama	September 21, 2022		1 season, 6 episodes	56–70 min	
Time Hustler	Comedy	December 25, 2022		1 season, 7 episodes	31–42 min	
Lady Voyeur	Psychological thriller	January 1, 2023		10 episodes	35–49 min	
The Endless Night	Drama	January 25, 2023		5 episodes	41–45 min	
#NoFilter	Comedy	February 15, 2023		1 season, 10 episodes	30–37 min	
Turn of the Tide	Thriller	May 26, 2023	April 10, 2026	3 seasons, 19 episodes	41–65 min	
Reporting for Duty	Comedy	September 6, 2023		1 season, 8 episodes	26–31 min	
End of the Line	Comedy	January 17, 2024		1 season, 7 episodes	21–24 min	
Luz: The Light of the Heart	Coming of age	February 7, 2024		1 season, 20 episodes	30–42 min	
Desperate Lies	Telenovela	July 5, 2024		17 episodes	36–59 min	
Children of the Church Steps	Drama	October 30, 2024		4 episodes	48–51 min	
Senna	Sports biopic	November 29, 2024		6 episodes	53–71 min	
Rivers of Fate	Drama miniseries	August 20, 2025		4 episodes	49–57 min	

=== Spanish ===
Title	Genre	Premiere	Finale	Seasons	Runtime	Notes
Daughter from Another Mother	Comedy	January 20, 2021	December 25, 2022	3 seasons, 27 episodes	34–44 min	
Sky Rojo	Action drama	March 19, 2021	January 13, 2023	3 seasons, 24 episodes	22–40 min	
Who Killed Sara?	Crime drama	March 24, 2021	May 18, 2022	3 seasons, 25 episodes	36–47 min	
The Innocent	Mystery thriller	April 30, 2021		8 episodes	49–71 min	
Somos.	Drama	June 30, 2021		1 season, 6 episodes	42–73 min	
The War Next-door	Comedy	July 7, 2021	June 17, 2022	2 seasons, 16 episodes	29–35 min	
The Kingdom	Crime drama	August 13, 2021	March 22, 2023	2 seasons, 14 episodes	36–59 min	
Everything Will Be Fine	Dramedy	August 20, 2021		1 season, 8 episodes	25–34 min	
Jaguar	Historical drama	September 22, 2021		1 season, 6 episodes	37–51 min	
The Five Juanas	Telenovela	October 6, 2021		1 season, 18 episodes	33–48 min	
The Time It Takes	Drama	October 29, 2021		1 season, 10 episodes	12–13 min	
Rebelde	Teen drama	January 5, 2022	July 27, 2022	2 seasons, 16 episodes	32–48 min	
Feria: The Darkest Light	Fantasy	January 28, 2022		1 season, 8 episodes	41–60 min	
Secrets of Summer	Teen drama	February 16, 2022	December 30, 2022	2 seasons, 19 episodes	23–40 min	
Savage Rhythm	Drama	March 2, 2022		1 season, 8 episodes	27–49 min	
Once Upon a Time... Happily Never After	Musical comedy	March 11, 2022		1 season, 6 episodes	26–34 min	
Heirs to the Land	Period drama	April 15, 2022		1 season, 8 episodes	48–57 min	
The Marked Heart	Thriller drama	April 20, 2022	April 19, 2023	2 seasons, 24 episodes	38–51 min	
Welcome to Eden	Science fiction	May 6, 2022	April 21, 2023	2 seasons, 16 episodes	36–52 min	
42 Days of Darkness	Crime thriller	May 11, 2022		1 season, 6 episodes	40–59 min	
Intimacy	Drama	June 10, 2022		1 season, 8 episodes	44–51 min	
The Longest Night	Crime drama	July 8, 2022		1 season, 6 episodes	42–48 min	
Fanático	Drama	July 29, 2022		1 season, 5 episodes	14–21 min	
High Heat	Telenovela	August 17, 2022		1 season, 39 episodes	30–45 min	
The Girl in the Mirror	Supernatural drama	August 19, 2022		1 season, 9 episodes	40–59 min	
You're Nothing Special	Comedy	September 2, 2022		1 season, 6 episodes	33–38 min	
Santo	Thriller	September 16, 2022		1 season, 6 episodes	42–49 min	
The Girls at the Back	Comedy drama	September 23, 2022		1 season, 6 episodes	38–45 min	
The Fight for Justice: Paolo Guerrero	Biopic	October 5, 2022		1 season, 6 episodes	38–50 min	
Belascoarán, PI	Detective drama	October 12, 2022		1 season, 3 episodes	71–81 min	
Holy Family	Drama	October 14, 2022	November 17, 2023	2 seasons, 16 episodes	33–44 min	
If Only	Drama	October 28, 2022		1 season, 8 episodes	31–37 min	
Smiley	Comedy	December 7, 2022		1 season, 8 episodes	33–37 min	
The Most Beautiful Flower	Teen comedy	December 7, 2022		1 season, 10 episodes	28–39 min	
Against the Ropes	Comedy drama	January 25, 2023		1 season, 10 episodes	36–54 min	
The Snow Girl	Thriller	January 27, 2023	January 31, 2025	2 seasons, 12 episodes	42–51 min	
In Love All Over Again	Romantic drama	February 14, 2023		1 season, 8 episodes	40–54 min	
Eva Lasting	Romantic drama	February 15, 2023	March 18, 2026	4 seasons, 45 episodes	36–51 min	
Community Squad	Comedy	February 17, 2023	July 17, 2025	2 seasons, 14 episodes	22–29 min	
Triptych	Thriller	February 22, 2023		1 season, 8 episodes	38–48 min	
Sky High: The Series	Crime drama	March 17, 2023		1 season, 7 episodes	39–49 min	
Love After Music	Biopic	April 26, 2023		1 season, 8 episodes	36–46 min	
Muted	Thriller	May 19, 2023		6 episodes	44–47 min	
Fake Profile	Drama	May 31, 2023	April 15, 2026	3 seasons, 30 episodes	34–49 min	
The Surrogacy	Drama	June 14, 2023		1 season, 24 episodes	33–44 min	
A Perfect Story	Romantic comedy	July 28, 2023		5 episodes	35–53 min	
The Chosen One	Supernatural drama	August 16, 2023		1 season, 6 episodes	35–47 min	
Burning Body	Drama	September 8, 2023		8 episodes	45–52 min	
Thursday's Widows	Drama	September 14, 2023		6 episodes	41–47 min	
Pact of Silence	Telenovela	October 11, 2023		1 season, 18 episodes	35–43 min	
Nothing to See Here	Comedy drama	November 17, 2023	November 20, 2024	2 seasons, 16 episodes	22–34 min	
Cindy la Regia: The High School Years	Coming-of-age	December 20, 2023		1 season, 7 episodes	24–32 min	
Berlin and the Jewels of Paris	Heist crime drama	December 29, 2023		8 episodes	42–60 min	
Baby Bandito	Heist drama	January 31, 2024	October 22, 2025	2 seasons, 16 episodes	34–43 min	
Bandidos	Heist drama	March 13, 2024	January 3, 2025	2 seasons, 14 episodes	39–52 min	
Iron Reign	Thriller	March 15, 2024		1 season, 8 episodes	47–72 min	
The Hijacking of Flight 601	Drama	April 10, 2024		1 season, 6 episodes	44–59 min	
The Asunta Case	Crime drama	April 26, 2024		6 episodes	47–68 min	
Raising Voices	Teen drama	May 31, 2024		8 episodes	41–48 min	
Envious	Comedy	September 18, 2024	April 29, 2026	4 seasons, 43 episodes	21–40 min	
We Were Kings	Drama	September 25, 2024		1 season, 6 episodes	35–41 min	
The Secret of the River	Drama	October 9, 2024		1 season, 8 episodes	33–47 min	
The Last Night at Tremore Beach	Thriller	October 25, 2024		8 episodes	57–82 min	
Bank Under Siege	Heist	November 8, 2024		5 episodes	36–54 min	
Sisters' Feud	Drama	November 13, 2024		1 season, 20 episodes	33–43 min	
One Hundred Years of Solitude	Magical realist drama	December 11, 2024	August 26, 2026	2 parts, 16 episodes	57–103 min	
1992	Thriller	December 13, 2024		1 season, 6 episodes	38–49 min	
Prison Cell 211	Crime drama	February 5, 2025		1 season, 6 episodes	33–41 min	
Medusa	Drama	March 5, 2025	September 30, 2026	2 seasons, 24 episodes	31–46 min	
Welcome to the Family	Drama	March 12, 2025		1 season, 8 episodes	24–36 min	
Caught	Thriller	March 26, 2025		1 season, 6 episodes	44–62 min	
The Lady's Companion	Period drama	March 28, 2025		1 season, 8 episodes	37–48 min	
The Gardener	Thriller	April 11, 2025		6 episodes	44–48 min	
Snakes and Ladders	Comedy	May 14, 2025		1 season, 8 episodes	33–45 min	
Rotten Legacy	Drama	May 16, 2025		1 season, 8 episodes	42–53 min	
Olympo	Teen drama	June 20, 2025		1 season, 8 episodes	42–53 min	
The Gringo Hunters	Crime thriller	July 9, 2025		1 season, 12 episodes	44–53 min	
Delirium	Thriller	July 18, 2025		8 episodes	38–46 min	
Superstar	Music biopic	July 18, 2025		6 episodes	46–63 min	
Unspeakable Sins	Drama	July 30, 2025		1 season, 18 episodes	34–45 min	
Two Graves	Thriller	August 29, 2025		3 episodes	42–54 min	
The Dead Girls	Crime drama	September 10, 2025		6 episodes	61–79 min	
Maledictions	Political thriller	September 12, 2025		3 episodes	35–48 min	
Billionaires' Bunker	Post-apocalyptic drama	September 19, 2025		1 season, 8 episodes	45–70 min	
The Guest	Thriller	September 24, 2025		1 season, 20 episodes	35–53 min	
No One Saw Us Leave	Drama	October 15, 2025		1 season, 5 episodes	46–52 min	
Just Alice	Comedy drama	November 5, 2025		1 season, 19 episodes	34–45 min	
How to Win the Lottery	Drama	November 14, 2025		1 season, 6 episodes	36–49 min	
The Crystal Cuckoo	Drama thriller	November 14, 2025		6 episodes	43–57 min	

=== Swedish ===
Title	Genre	Premiere	Finale	Seasons	Runtime	Notes
Snabba Cash	Thriller	April 7, 2021	September 22, 2022	2 seasons, 12 episodes	38–51 min	
Young Royals	Coming-of-age drama	July 1, 2021	March 18, 2024	3 seasons, 18 episodes	40–57 min	
The Unlikely Murderer	Crime drama miniseries	November 5, 2021		5 episodes	43–52 min	
Anxious People	Comedy drama	December 29, 2021		6 episodes	23–34 min	
Clark	Drama	May 5, 2022		6 episodes	54–69 min	
Barracuda Queens	Heist crime drama	June 5, 2023	June 5, 2025	2 seasons, 12 episodes	26–34 min	
The Playlist	Docu-drama miniseries	October 13, 2022		6 episodes	45–56 min	
Tore	Coming-of-age comedy drama	October 27, 2023		1 season, 6 episodes	29–34 min	
A Nearly Normal Family	Crime thriller	November 24, 2023		6 episodes	36–50 min	
Deliver Me	Crime drama	April 24, 2024		5 episodes	38–48 min	
The Helicopter Heist	Heist drama	November 22, 2024		8 episodes	38–49 min	
The Breakthrough	Crime drama	January 7, 2025		4 episodes	35–42 min	
The Glass Dome	Crime drama	April 15, 2025		6 episodes	42–50 min	
Diary of a Ditched Girl	Drama	September 11, 2025		1 season, 7 episodes	26–35 min	
The New Force	Period drama	October 3, 2025		1 season, 6 episodes	37–43 min	

=== Thai ===
Title	Genre	Premiere	Finale	Seasons	Runtime	Notes
Bangkok Breaking	Thriller	September 23, 2021		1 season, 6 episodes	54–64 min	
Hurts Like Hell	Sports drama	July 13, 2022		4 episodes	40–56 min	
School Tales the Series	Horror anthology	August 10, 2022		1 season, 8 episodes	45–50 min	
Thai Cave Rescue	Drama	September 22, 2022		6 episodes	53–76 min	
Delete	Science fiction thriller	June 28, 2023		1 season, 8 episodes	40–54 min	
6ixtynin9 the Series	Dark comedy thriller	September 6, 2023		6 episodes	40–66 min	
Analog Squad	Family drama	December 7, 2023		1 season, 8 episodes	55–70 min	
Don't Come Home	Mystery thriller	October 31, 2024		6 episodes	40–49 min	
Ready, Set, Love	Romantic mystery comedy	February 15, 2024		1 season, 6 episodes	63–79 min	
The Believers	Crime drama	March 27, 2024	December 4, 2025	2 seasons, 17 episodes	37–61 min	
Doctor Climax	Comedy drama	June 13, 2024		1 season, 8 episodes	48–65 min	
Master of the House	Drama	July 18, 2024		7 episodes	44–62 min	
Terror Tuesday: Extreme	Horror anthology	August 20, 2024		1 season, 8 episodes	38–46 min	
Tomorrow and I	Science fiction anthology	December 4, 2024		1 season, 4 episodes	66–81 min	
Dalah: Death and the Flowers	Crime drama	February 27, 2025		1 season, 6 episodes	44–61 min	
Mad Unicorn	Drama	May 29, 2025		7 episodes	55–71 min	

=== Turkish ===
Title	Genre	Premiere	Finale	Seasons	Runtime	Notes
50M2	Dark comedy	January 27, 2021		1 season, 8 episodes	44–64 min	
Fatma	Crime drama	April 27, 2021		1 season, 6 episodes	39–47 min	
The Club	Period drama	November 5, 2021	September 15, 2023	2 seasons, 20 episodes	29–69 min	
Midnight at the Pera Palace	Drama	March 3, 2022	September 12, 2024	2 seasons, 16 episodes	36–52 min	
Wild Abandon	Drama	March 30, 2022		8 episodes	44–62 min	
Yakamoz S-245	Drama	April 20, 2022		1 season, 7 episodes	40–53 min	
The Life and Movies of Erşan Kuneri	Sitcom	May 13, 2022	October 10, 2024	2 seasons, 16 episodes	38–56 min	
As the Crow Flies	Drama	June 3, 2022	April 11, 2024	3 seasons, 24 episodes	41–55 min	
Man on Pause	Comedy	October 7, 2022		6 episodes	42–46 min	
Hot Skull	Science fiction	December 2, 2022		1 season, 8 episodes	58–70 min	
Shahmaran	Fantasy	January 20, 2023	August 8, 2024	2 seasons, 14 episodes	43–59 min	
Who Were We Running From?	Thriller	March 24, 2023		7 episodes	35–46 min	
The Tailor	Mystery	May 2, 2023	November 3, 2023	3 seasons, 23 episodes	28–48 min	
Creature	Science fiction	October 20, 2023		8 episodes	38–55 min	
Kübra	Thriller	January 18, 2024	June 6, 2024	2 seasons, 16 episodes	37–49 min	
A Round of Applause	Drama	February 29, 2024		6 episodes	26–37 min	
Asaf	Drama	November 28, 2024		6 episodes	40–53 min	
Lovers Anonymous	Comedy drama	January 16, 2025		1 season, 8 episodes	48–57 min	
Bet Your Life	Supernatural drama	March 20, 2025		1 season, 8 episodes	33–45 min	
Istanbul Encyclopedia	Drama	April 17, 2025		8 episodes	34–52 min	
Letters from the Past	Drama	July 23, 2025		8 episodes	32–44 min	
Platonic	Comedy	September 18, 2025		1 season, 8 episodes	41–57 min	
The Town	Crime drama	December 11, 2025		8 episodes	30–42 min	

=== Zulu ===
Title	Genre	Premiere	Finale	Seasons	Runtime	Notes
The Brave Ones	Fantasy drama	September 16, 2022		1 season, 6 episodes	32–45 min	
Yoh! Christmas	Comedy	December 15, 2023		1 season, 6 episodes	31–37 min	
Go!	Thriller	March 21, 2025		1 season, 6 episodes	24–31 min	

=== Other ===
Title	Genre	Premiere	Finale	Seasons	Runtime	Language	Notes
Pitta Kathalu	Drama anthology series	February 19, 2021		4 episodes	35–39 min	Telugu	
Katla	Supernatural drama	June 17, 2021		1 season, 8 episodes	41–51 min	Icelandic	
Navarasa	Drama anthology series	August 6, 2021		9 episodes	28–48 min	Tamil	
Ludik	Drama	August 26, 2022		1 season, 6 episodes	46–62 min	Afrikaans	
CAT	Crime thriller	December 9, 2022		1 season, 8 episodes	40–48 min	Punjabi	
Olóládé	Comedy	November 24, 2023		1 season, 6 episodes	36–50 min	Yoruba	
Replacing Chef Chico	Drama	November 24, 2023		1 season, 8 episodes	32–36 min	Filipino	
Aníkúlápó: Rise of the Spectre	Drama	March 1, 2024		1 season, 6 episodes	54–74 min	Yoruba	
Òlòtūré: The Journey	Drama	June 28, 2024		3 episodes	33–39 min	Nigerian Pidgin	
Subteran	Crime drama	January 8, 2025		1 season, 6 episodes	40–53 min	Romanian	
The Game: You Never Play Alone	Techno-thriller	October 2, 2025		1 season, 7 episodes	29–38 min	Tamil	

== Unscripted ==
=== Docuseries ===
Title	Subject	Premiere	Finale	Seasons	Runtime	Language	Notes
Headspace Guide to Meditation	Lifestyle	January 1, 2021		1 season, 8 episodes	18–24 min	English	
History of Swear Words	Cultural history	January 5, 2021		1 season, 6 episodes	20 min	English	
Surviving Death	Parapsychology	January 6, 2021		6 episodes	48–57 min	English	
Pretend It's a City	Biography	January 8, 2021		7 episodes	26–31 min	English	
Night Stalker: The Hunt for a Serial Killer	True crime	January 13, 2021		4 episodes	46–48 min	English	
Spycraft	Technology	January 20, 2021		1 season, 8 episodes	29–38 min	English	
We Are: The Brooklyn Saints	Sports	January 29, 2021		1 season, 4 episodes	43–50 min	English	
Crime Scene: The Vanishing at the Cecil Hotel	True crime	February 10, 2021		4 episodes	51–58 min	English	
Amend: The Fight for America	Politics	February 17, 2021		6 episodes	56–62 min	English	
Murder Among the Mormons	True crime	March 3, 2021		3 episodes	45–58 min	English	
Nevenka: Breaking the Silence	True crime	March 5, 2021		3 episodes	34–41 min	Spanish	
The Houseboat	Lifestyle	March 9, 2021		4 episodes	29–44 min	German	
Last Chance U: Basketball	Sports	March 10, 2021	December 13, 2022	2 seasons, 16 episodes	50–68 min	English	
The Lost Pirate Kingdom	History	March 15, 2021		6 episodes	41–44 min	English	
Worn Stories	Fashion industry	April 1, 2021		8 episodes	28–31 min	English	
This Is a Robbery: The World's Biggest Art Heist	True crime	April 7, 2021		4 episodes	50–57 min	English	
My Love: Six Stories of True Love	Relationships	April 13, 2021		6 episodes	64–73 min	English	
Headspace Guide to Sleep	Lifestyle	April 28, 2021		1 season, 7 episodes	15–20 min	English	
The Sons of Sam: A Descent Into Darkness	True crime	May 5, 2021		4 episodes	58–62 min	English	
Money, Explained	Finance	May 11, 2021		5 episodes	22–23 min	English	
High on the Hog: How African American Cuisine Transformed America	Food/history	May 26, 2021	November 22, 2023	2 seasons, 8 episodes	45–58 min	English	
Penguin Town	Nature	June 16, 2021		8 episodes	25–30 min	English	
Sophie: A Murder in West Cork	True crime	June 30, 2021		3 episodes	49–64 min	English	
Cat People	Pets/Subcultures	July 7, 2021		6 episodes	28–35 min	English	
Elize Matsunaga: Once Upon a Crime	True crime	July 8, 2021		4 episodes	47–52 min	Portuguese	
How to Become a Tyrant	Politics	July 9, 2021		6 episodes	25–30 min	English	
Heist	True crime	July 14, 2021		1 season, 6 episodes	41–48 min	English	
Naomi Osaka	Biography/Sports	July 16, 2021		3 episodes	32–42 min	English	
Myth & Mogul: John DeLorean	Biography	July 30, 2021		1 season, 3 episodes	41–48 min	English	
Cocaine Cowboys: The Kings of Miami	True crime	August 4, 2021		6 episodes	40–50 min	English	
John of God: The Crimes of a Spiritual Healer	True crime	August 25, 2021		1 season, 4 episodes	48–56 min	Portuguese	
Turning Point: 9/11 and the War on Terror	History	September 1, 2021		5 episodes	59–66 min	English	
Countdown: Inspiration4 Mission to Space	Technology	September 6, 2021	September 30, 2021	5 episodes	38–67 min	English	
Crime Stories: India Detectives	True crime	September 22, 2021		4 episodes	37–53 min	Kannada	
Monsters Inside: The 24 Faces of Billy Milligan	True crime	September 22, 2021		4 episodes	59–63 min	English	
Vendetta: Truth, Lies and the Mafia	True crime	September 24, 2021		6 episodes	33–44 min	Italian	
A Sinister Sect: Colonia Dignidad	True crime	October 1, 2021		1 season, 6 episodes	41–65 min	Spanish	
Bad Sport	Sports/True crime	October 6, 2021		1 season, 6 episodes	55–85 min	English	
House of Secrets: The Burari Deaths	True crime	October 8, 2021		3 episodes	43–48 min	English	
The Raincoat Killer: Chasing a Predator in Korea	True crime	October 22, 2021		3 episodes	43–53 min	Korean	
The Motive	True crime	October 28, 2021		4 episodes	31–42 min	Hebrew	
Catching Killers	True crime	November 4, 2021	June 23, 2023	3 seasons, 12 episodes	31–46 min	English	
Where Is Marta?	True crime	November 5, 2021		3 episodes	58–70 min	Spanish	
Your Life Is a Joke	Professions	November 9, 2021		1 season, 3 episodes	36–39 min	German	
Animal	Nature	November 10, 2021	March 18, 2022	2 seasons, 8 episodes	43–49 min	English	
Reasonable Doubt: A Tale of Two Kidnappings	True crime	November 23, 2021		4 episodes	44–48 min	Spanish	
Dig Deeper: The Disappearance of Birgit Meier	True crime	November 26, 2021		4 episodes	57–60 min	German	
Voir	Film industry	December 6, 2021		1 season, 6 episodes	17–23 min	English	
Tiger King: The Doc Antle Story	Biography	December 10, 2021		3 episodes	39–47 min	English	
Stories of a Generation – with Pope Francis	Society	December 25, 2021		4 episodes	44–49 min	English	
Crime Scene: The Times Square Killer	True crime	December 29, 2021		3 episodes	47–50 min	English	
The Puppet Master: Hunting the Ultimate Conman	True crime	January 18, 2022		3 episodes	29–50 min	English	
Heavenly Bites: Mexico	Food	January 19, 2022		1 season, 6 episodes	27–32 min	Spanish	
Midnight Asia: Eat. Dance. Dream.	Travel	January 20, 2022		6 episodes	33–39 min	English	
Neymar: The Perfect Chaos	Sports/Biography	January 25, 2022		3 episodes	50–61 min	Portuguese	
Jeen-Yuhs: A Kanye Trilogy	Biography	February 16, 2022	March 2, 2022	3 episodes	89–97 min	English	
Race: Bubba Wallace	Sports/Biography	February 22, 2022		6 episodes	44–50 min	English	
Worst Roommate Ever	True crime	March 1, 2022	June 26, 2024	2 seasons, 9 episodes	39–62 min	English	
The Andy Warhol Diaries	Biography	March 9, 2022		6 episodes	52–77 min	English	
Bad Vegan: Fame. Fraud. Fugitives.	True crime	March 16, 2022		4 episodes	44–61 min	English	
The Great Robbery of Brazil's Central Bank	True crime	March 16, 2022		1 season, 3 episodes	59–61 min	Portuguese	
The Principles of Pleasure	Sex	March 22, 2022		3 episodes	48–55 min	English	
800 Meters	True crime	March 25, 2022		3 episodes	51–53 min	Spanish	
Johnny Hallyday: Beyond Rock	Biography	March 29, 2022		5 episodes	32–37 min	French	
Jimmy Savile: A British Horror Story	True crime	April 6, 2022		2 episodes	79–91 min	English	
Senzo: Murder of a Soccer Star	True crime	April 7, 2022		1 season, 5 episodes	36–42 min	English	
Our Great National Parks	Nature	April 13, 2022		5 episodes	50–54 min	English	
Conversations with a Killer: The John Wayne Gacy Tapes	True crime	April 20, 2022		3 episodes	59–64 min	English	
Meltdown: Three Mile Island	History	May 4, 2022		4 episodes	40–48 min	English	
Wild Babies	Nature	May 5, 2022		8 episodes	27–34 min	English	
The G Word with Adam Conover	Politics	May 19, 2022		6 episodes	25–32 min	English	
Mr. Good: Cop or Crook?	True crime	June 3, 2022		4 episodes	43–56 min	Norwegian	
Keep Sweet: Pray and Obey	True crime	June 8, 2022		4 episodes	45–53 min	English	
Web of Make Believe: Death, Lies and the Internet	True crime	June 15, 2022		1 season, 6 episodes	46–64 min	English	
The Future Of	Technology	June 21, 2022	June 28, 2022	1 season, 12 episodes	17–22 min	English	
The Hidden Lives of Pets	Pets	June 22, 2022		1 season, 4 episodes	30–33 min	English	
How to Change Your Mind	Lifestyle	July 12, 2022		4 episodes	51–55 min	English	
D.B. Cooper: Where Are You?!	True crime	July 13, 2022		4 episodes	38–44 min	English	
Indian Predator: The Butcher of Delhi	True crime	July 20, 2022		3 episodes	40–43 min	Hindi	
Street Food: USA	Food/Culinary art	July 26, 2022		6 episodes	28–35 min	English	
The Most Hated Man on the Internet	True crime	July 27, 2022		3 episodes	43–61 min	English	
Trainwreck: Woodstock '99	Music	August 3, 2022		1 season, 3 episodes	45–51 min	English	
I Just Killed My Dad	True crime	August 9, 2022		3 episodes	36–46 min	English	
Untold: The Girlfriend Who Didn't Exist	Sports	August 16, 2022		2 episodes	60–64 min	English	
A Kidnapping Scandal: The Florence Cassez Affair	True crime	August 25, 2022		1 season, 5 episodes	50–70 min	Spanish	
Club América vs Club América	Sports	August 31, 2022		1 season, 6 episodes	46–53 min	Spanish	
Chef's Table: Pizza	Food/Culinary art	September 7, 2022		6 episodes	42–46 min	English	
Indian Predator: The Diary of a Serial Killer	True crime	September 7, 2022		1 season, 3 episodes	36–44 min	Hindi	
Sins of Our Mother	True crime	September 14, 2022		3 episodes	39–50 min	English	
Terim	Sports/Biography	September 15, 2022		1 season, 4 episodes	52–58 min	Turkish	
Fortune Seller: A TV Scam	True crime	September 21, 2022		1 season, 4 episodes	45–52 min	Italian	
The Real Bling Ring: Hollywood Heist	True crime	September 21, 2022		3 episodes	46–50 min	English	
Eat the Rich: The GameStop Saga	Society	September 28, 2022		3 episodes	29–41 min	English	
Human Playground	Sports	September 30, 2022		1 season, 6 episodes	36–42 min	English	
Aftershock: Everest and the Nepal Earthquake	Natural disasters	October 6, 2022		3 episodes	38–58 min	English	
Conversations with a Killer: The Jeffrey Dahmer Tapes	True crime	October 7, 2022		3 episodes	58–62 min	English	
Island of the Sea Wolves	Nature	October 12, 2022		3 episodes	40–45 min	English	
Sue Perkins: Perfectly Legal	Travel/Food	October 13, 2022		1 season, 3 episodes	38–45 min	English	
Take 1	Music	October 14, 2022		1 season, 7 episodes	49–65 min	Korean	
Vatican Girl: The Disappearance of Emanuela Orlandi	True crime	October 20, 2022		4 episodes	55–63 min	Italian	
Earthstorm	Natural disasters	October 27, 2022		1 season, 4 episodes	42–49 min	English	
Indian Predator: Murder in a Courtroom	True crime	October 28, 2022		3 episodes	53–58 min	Marathi	
My Encounter with Evil	True crime	October 28, 2022		1 season, 4 episodes	37–46 min	Spanish	
Killer Sally	True crime	November 3, 2022		3 episodes	43–54 min	English	
FIFA Uncovered	Sports	November 9, 2022		4 episodes	51–59 min	English	
Ancient Apocalypse	History	November 11, 2022	October 16, 2024	2 seasons, 14 episodes	28–42 min	English	
Pepsi, Where's My Jet?	Society	November 17, 2022		4 episodes	36–43 min	English	
Our Universe	Nature	November 22, 2022		6 episodes	41–45 min	English	
Blood, Sex & Royalty	History	November 23, 2022		1 season, 3 episodes	42–46 min	English	
Crime Scene: The Texas Killing Fields	True crime	November 29, 2022		3 episodes	47–50 min	English	
Harry & Meghan	Biography	December 8, 2022	December 15, 2022	6 episodes	40–60 min	English	
Beast of Bangalore: Indian Predator	True crime	December 16, 2022		3 episodes	42–51 min	Kannada	
Live to Lead	Biography	December 31, 2022		7 episodes	26–30 min	English	
Madoff: The Monster of Wall Street	True crime	January 4, 2023		4 episodes	54–77 min	English	
Break Point	Sports	January 13, 2023	January 10, 2024	2 seasons, 16 episodes	40–58 min	English	
Gunther's Millions	Society/Pets	February 1, 2023		4 episodes	40–46 min	English	
Bill Russell: Legend	Biography/Sports	February 8, 2023		2 episodes	93–106 min	English	
The Romantics	Biography	February 14, 2023		4 episodes	48–62 min	English	
African Queens: Njinga	History	February 15, 2023		4 episodes	44–48 min	English	
Murdaugh Murders: A Southern Scandal	True crime	February 22, 2023	September 20, 2023	2 seasons, 6 episodes	33–50 min	English	
Monique Olivier: Accessory to Evil	True crime	March 2, 2023		5 episodes	38–43 min	French	
In the Name of God: A Holy Betrayal	True crime	March 3, 2023		1 season, 8 episodes	39–70 min	Korean	
MH370: The Plane That Disappeared	Society	March 8, 2023		3 episodes	43–60 min	English	
Waco: American Apocalypse	True crime	March 22, 2023		3 episodes	44–51 min	English	
Emergency: NYC	Emergency medicine	March 29, 2023		1 season, 8 episodes	39–45 min	English	
American Manhunt: The Boston Marathon Bombing	True crime	April 12, 2023		3 episodes	52–62 min	English	
Running for My Truth: Alex Schwazer	Sports	April 13, 2023		1 season, 4 episodes	45–50 min	Italian	
How to Get Rich	Finance	April 18, 2023		1 season, 8 episodes	29–38 min	English	
Chimp Empire	Nature	April 19, 2023		4 episodes	42–51 min	English	
Missing: Dead or Alive?	True crime	May 10, 2023	November 24, 2025	2 seasons, 8 episodes	31–67 min	English	
Queen Cleopatra	History	May 10, 2023		4 episodes	41–48 min	English	
McGregor Forever	Sports/Biography	May 17, 2023		4 episodes	46–54 min	English	
Working: What We Do All Day	Society	May 17, 2023		4 episodes	45–49 min	English	
MerPeople	Subcultures	May 23, 2023		4 episodes	41–48 min	English	
Arnold	Biography	June 7, 2023		3 episodes	62–66 min	English	
The Playing Card Killer	True crime	June 9, 2023		3 episodes	45–58 min	Spanish	
Muscles & Mayhem: An Unauthorized Story of American Gladiators	Television industry	June 28, 2023		5 episodes	36–46 min	English	
The King Who Never Was	True crime	July 4, 2023		1 season, 3 episodes	39–47 min	Italian	
How to Become a Cult Leader	Cults	July 28, 2023		1 season, 6 episodes	29–32 min	English	
The Last Hours of Mario Biondo	True crime	August 3, 2023		3 episodes	41–44 min	Spanish	
The Hunt for Veerappan	True crime	August 4, 2023		4 episodes	46–56 min	English	
Ladies First: A Story of Women in Hip-Hop	Music	August 9, 2023		4 episodes	36–48 min	English	
Untold: Swamp Kings	Sports	August 22, 2023		4 episodes	45–47 min	English	
Heart of Invictus	Sports	August 30, 2023		5 episodes	45–61 min	English	
Live to 100: Secrets of the Blue Zones	Travel	August 30, 2023		4 episodes	32–45 min	English	
Spy Ops	History	September 8, 2023		1 season, 8 episodes	35–51 min	English	
Wrestlers	Sports	September 13, 2023		1 season, 7 episodes	48–58 min	English	
Who Killed Jill Dando?	True crime	September 26, 2023		3 episodes	43–50 min	English	
Encounters	Extraterrestrials	September 27, 2023		1 season, 4 episodes	44–52 min	English	
Vasco Rossi: Living It	Music/biography	September 27, 2023		5 episodes	44–53 min	Italian	
Beckham	Sports	October 4, 2023		4 episodes	66–76 min	English	
Big Vape: The Rise and Fall of Juul	Business	October 11, 2023		4 episodes	43–51 min	English	
Get Gotti	True crime	October 24, 2023		1 season, 3 episodes	46–57 min	English	
Life on Our Planet	Nature	October 25, 2023		1 season, 8 episodes	41–55 min	English	
Mysteries of the Faith	Religion	November 1, 2023		1 season, 4 episodes	38–44 min	English	
Till Murder Do Us Part: Soering vs. Haysom	True crime	November 1, 2023		4 episodes	43–52 min	English	
Escaping Twin Flames	Cults	November 8, 2023		1 season, 3 episodes	57–58 min	English	
Robbie Williams	Music	November 8, 2023		4 episodes	40–55 min	English	
The Billionaire, the Butler and the Boyfriend	Politics	November 8, 2023		3 episodes	48–52 min	French	
How to Become a Mob Boss	Organized crime	November 14, 2023		1 season, 6 episodes	28–33 min	English	
Bad Surgeon: Love Under the Knife	True crime	November 29, 2023		1 season, 3 episodes	48–58 min	English	
World War II: From the Frontlines	History	December 7, 2023		1 season, 6 episodes	42–56 min	English	
Under Pressure: The U.S. Women's World Cup Team	Sports	December 12, 2023		4 episodes	42–45 min	English	
If I Were Luísa Sonza	Music	December 13, 2023		1 season, 3 episodes	33–43 min	Portuguese	
Captains of the World	Sports	December 30, 2023		1 season, 6 episodes	41–55 min	English	
You Are What You Eat: A Twin Experiment	Lifestyle/Food	January 1, 2024		4 episodes	44–60 min	English	
American Nightmare	True crime	January 17, 2024		1 season, 3 episodes	43–46 min	English	
Six Nations: Full Contact	Sports	January 24, 2024	January 29, 2025	2 seasons, 16 episodes	33–49 min	English	
Full Speed	Sports	January 30, 2024	May 7, 2025	2 seasons, 10 episodes	42–50 min	English	(Note: These shows were cancelled by Netflix, but were picked up by another channel or streaming service for additional seasons.)
Alexander: The Making of a God	History	January 31, 2024		1 season, 6 episodes	37–44 min	English	
Raël: The Alien Prophet	True crime	February 7, 2024		4 episodes	43–49 min	French	
Little Nicholas: Life of a Scoundrel	Politics	February 15, 2024		3 episodes	43–60 min	Spanish	
Can I Tell You a Secret?	True crime	February 21, 2024		2 episodes	50–51 min	English	
American Conspiracy: The Octopus Murders	True crime	February 28, 2024		1 season, 4 episodes	48–67 min	English	
The Indrani Mukerjea Story: Buried Truth	True crime	February 29, 2024		1 season, 4 episodes	44–50 min	English	
The Program: Cons, Cults, and Kidnapping	True crime	March 5, 2024		3 episodes	62–66 min	English	
ARA San Juan: The Submarine That Disappeared	History	March 7, 2024		8 episodes	24–31 min	Spanish	
Turning Point: The Bomb and the Cold War	History	March 12, 2024		1 season, 9 episodes	64–79 min	English	
From Dreams to Tragedy: The Fire That Shook Brazilian Football	Sports	March 14, 2024		3 episodes	34–42 min	Portuguese	
The Outreau Case: A French Nightmare	True crime	March 15, 2024		4 episodes	44–48 min	French	
Testament: The Story of Moses	History/Religion	March 27, 2024		1 season, 3 episodes	81–88 min	English	
Crime Scene Berlin: Nightlife Killer	True crime	April 3, 2024		1 season, 3 episodes	34–37 min	German	
Files of the Unexplained	Paranormal	April 3, 2024		1 season, 8 episodes	30–48 min	English	
Our Living World	Nature	April 17, 2024		4 episodes	49–51 min	English	
Cooking Up Murder: Uncovering the Story of César Román	True crime	May 10, 2024		3 episodes	45–51 min	Spanish	
Ashley Madison: Sex, Lies & Scandal	True crime	May 15, 2024		1 season, 3 episodes	49–53 min	English	
Toughest Forces on Earth	Military	May 22, 2024		1 season, 8 episodes	39–42 min	English	
Dancing for the Devil: The 7M TikTok Cult	True crime	May 29, 2024		1 season, 3 episodes	49–58 min	English	
Hitler and the Nazis: Evil on Trial	History	June 5, 2024		1 season, 6 episodes	59–66 min	English	
Sprint	Sports	July 2, 2024	November 13, 2024	2 seasons, 10 episodes	33–57 min	English	
The Man with 1000 Kids	True crime	July 3, 2024		3 episodes	40–43 min	English	
Receiver	Sports	July 10, 2024		1 season, 8 episodes	52–62 min	English	
LALIGA: All Access	Sports	July 15, 2024		1 season, 8 episodes	43–52 min	Spanish	
The Yara Gambirasio Case: Beyond Reasonable Doubt	True crime	July 16, 2024		5 episodes	46–55 min	Italian	
Simone Biles Rising	Sports	July 17, 2024	October 25, 2024	1 season, 4 episodes	45–55 min	English	
Dirty Pop: The Boy Band Scam	Music	July 24, 2024		3 episodes	41–44 min	English	
American Murder: Laci Peterson	True crime	August 14, 2024		1 season, 3 episodes	51–54 min	English	
Pop Star Academy: Katseye	Music	August 21, 2024		1 season, 8 episodes	50–55 min	English	
Wyatt Earp and the Cowboy War	Docudrama/History	August 21, 2024		1 season, 6 episodes	30–49 min	English	
Caught in the Web: The Murders Behind Zona Divas	True crime	September 5, 2024		4 episodes	39–44 min	Spanish	
Jack Whitehall: Fatherhood with My Father	Travel	September 10, 2024		1 season, 4 episodes	40–43 min	English	
Ángel Di María: Breaking Down the Wall	Sports	September 12, 2024		3 episodes	54–57 min	Spanish	
Into the Fire: The Lost Daughter	True crime	September 12, 2024		2 episodes	73–78 min	English	
What's Next? The Future with Bill Gates	Science/Technology	September 18, 2024		1 season, 5 episodes	42–52 min	English	
Mr. McMahon	Sports	September 25, 2024		6 episodes	51–65 min	English	
Chef's Table: Noodles	Food/Culinary art	October 2, 2024		1 season, 4 episodes	46–50 min	English	
Starting 5	Sports	October 9, 2024	October 16, 2025	2 seasons, 18 episodes	39–73 min	English	
The Comeback: The 2004 Red Sox	Sports	October 23, 2024		1 season, 3 episodes	57–67 min	English	
This Is the Zodiac Speaking	True crime	October 23, 2024		1 season, 3 episodes	42–49 min	English	
The Manhattan Alien Abduction	Extraterrestrials	October 30, 2024		3 episodes	37–44 min	English	
Countdown: Paul vs. Tyson	Sports	November 7, 2024	November 12, 2024	1 season, 3 episodes	32–42 min	English	
Investigation Alien	Extraterrestrials	November 8, 2024		1 season, 6 episodes	33–40 min	English	
Our Oceans	Nature	November 20, 2024		1 season, 5 episodes	58–63 min	English	
Saudi Pro League: Kick Off	Sports	November 21, 2024		1 season, 6 episodes	39–50 min	Arabic	
900 Days Without Anabel	True crime	November 22, 2024		3 episodes	45–59 min	Spanish	
Cold Case: Who Killed JonBenét Ramsey	True crime	November 25, 2024		1 season, 3 episodes	58–62 min	English	
Churchill at War	History	December 4, 2024		1 season, 4 episodes	56–61 min	English	
Polo	Sports	December 10, 2024		1 season, 5 episodes	43–52 min	English	
The Kings of Tupelo: A Southern Crime Saga	True crime	December 11, 2024		1 season, 3 episodes	54–75 min	English	
Aaron Rodgers: Enigma	Sports	December 17, 2024		1 season, 3 episodes	64–69 min	English	
Univerxo Dabiz	Food	December 20, 2024		5 episodes	37–46 min	Spanish	
Jerry Springer: Fights, Camera, Action	Television	January 7, 2025		2 episodes	48–49 min	English	
The Roshans	Filmmaking	January 17, 2025		1 season, 4 episodes	39–54 min	Hindi	
American Manhunt: O.J. Simpson	True crime	January 29, 2025		1 season, 4 episodes	66–92 min	English	
The Greatest Rivalry: India vs Pakistan	Sports	February 7, 2025		1 season, 3 episodes	34–40 min	English	
Surviving Black Hawk Down	History	February 10, 2025		3 episodes	47–56 min	English	
American Murder: Gabby Petito	True crime	February 17, 2025		1 season, 3 episodes	39–48 min	English	
Court of Gold	Sports	February 18, 2025		1 season, 6 episodes	37–46 min	English	
Aitana: Metamorphosis	Music	February 28, 2025		6 episodes	35–46 min	Spanish	
From Rock Star to Killer	True crime	March 27, 2025		3 episodes	41–42 min	French	
Gold & Greed: The Hunt for Fenn's Treasure	Treasure hunting	March 27, 2025		1 season, 3 episodes	48–56 min	English	
Gone Girls: The Long Island Serial Killer	True crime	March 31, 2025		1 season, 3 episodes	49–56 min	English	
Garnachas: Glorious Street Food!	Food	April 2, 2025		3 episodes	37–49 min	Spanish	
The Clubhouse: A Year with the Red Sox	Sports	April 8, 2025		1 season, 8 episodes	40–60 min	English	
Bad Influence: The Dark Side of Kidfluencing	Social media/True crime	April 9, 2025		1 season, 3 episodes	45–52 min	English	
The Diamond Heist	True crime	April 16, 2025		3 episodes	41–47 min	English	
Race for the Crown	Sports	April 22, 2025		1 season, 6 episodes	37–46 min	English	
A Tragedy Foretold: Flight 3054	Aviation accidents and incidents	April 23, 2025		1 season, 3 episodes	37–51 min	Portuguese	
Carlos Alcaraz: My Way	Sports	April 23, 2025		1 season, 3 episodes	33–44 min	Spanish	
Chef's Table: Legends	Food/Culinary art	April 28, 2025		1 season, 4 episodes	43–51 min	English	
Turning Point: The Vietnam War	History	April 30, 2025		1 season, 5 episodes	72–84 min	English	
American Manhunt: Osama bin Laden	True crime	May 14, 2025		1 season, 3 episodes	43–81 min	English	
Fred & Rose West: A British Horror Story	True crime	May 14, 2025		3 episodes	47–57 min	English	
Cold Case: The Tylenol Murders	True crime	May 26, 2025		1 season, 3 episodes	36–43 min	English	
F1: The Academy	Sports	May 28, 2025		1 season, 7 episodes	32–41 min	English	
Power Moves with Shaquille O'Neal	Sports	June 4, 2025		1 season, 6 episodes	27–34 min	English	
Cocaine Air: Smugglers at 30,000 Ft.	True crime	June 11, 2025		3 episodes	42–45 min	French	
The Many Deaths of Nora Dalmasso	True crime	June 19, 2025		3 episodes	47–59 min	Spanish	
Attack on London: Hunting the 7/7 Bombers	True crime	July 1, 2025		4 episodes	40–51 min	English	
Off Road	Travel documentary	July 10, 2025		1 season, 6 episodes	30–42 min	Hebrew	
Amy Bradley Is Missing	True crime	July 16, 2025		1 season, 3 episodes	40–49 min	English	
Critical: Between Life and Death	Emergency medical services	July 23, 2025		1 season, 6 episodes	42–48 min	English	
Angi: Fake Life, True Crime	True crime	July 25, 2025		2 episodes	37–38 min	Spanish	
Trainwreck: Storm Area 51	Conspiracy theory	July 29, 2025		2 episodes	48–49 min	English	
Conversations with a Killer: The Son of Sam Tapes	True crime	July 30, 2025		1 season, 3 episodes	54–60 min	English	
SEC Football: Any Given Saturday	Sports	August 5, 2025		1 season, 7 episodes	34–50 min	English	
The Echoes of Survivors: Inside Korea's Tragedies	True crime	August 15, 2025		1 season, 8 episodes	50–61 min	Korean	
Fit for TV: The Reality of The Biggest Loser	Television industry	August 15, 2025		1 season, 3 episodes	39–44 min	English	
America's Team: The Gambler and His Cowboys	Sports	August 19, 2025		1 season, 8 episodes	42–68 min	English	
Katrina: Come Hell and High Water	Natural disaster	August 27, 2025		1 season, 3 episodes	62–88 min	English	
Countdown: Canelo vs. Crawford	Sports	September 4, 2025		1 season, 2 episodes	44–45 min	English	
Love Con Revenge	True crime	September 5, 2025		1 season, 6 episodes	33–49 min	English	
aka Charlie Sheen	Biography	September 10, 2025		2 episodes	88–93 min	English	
Beauty and the Bester	True crime	September 12, 2025		3 episodes	40–49 min	English	
Matchroom: The Greatest Showmen	Sports	September 17, 2025		1 season, 6 episodes	31–54 min	English	
Nightmares of Nature	Nature	September 30, 2025	October 28, 2025	2 seasons, 6 episodes	39–48 min	English	
True Haunting	Supernatural	October 7, 2025		1 season, 5 episodes	34–39 min	English	
Victoria Beckham	Biography/Fashion	October 9, 2025		3 episodes	40–54 min	English	
Mob War: Philadelphia vs. the Mafia	Organized crime/True crime	October 22, 2025		1 season, 3 episodes	42–48 min	English	
Juan Gabriel: I Must, I Can, I Will	Music	October 30, 2025		4 episodes	51–67 min	Spanish	
Start Up, Fall Down: From Billionaire to Convict	True crime	November 5, 2025		3 episodes	39–45 min	Italian	
Marines	Military	November 10, 2025		1 season, 4 episodes	43–52 min	English	
50 Seconds: The Fernando Báez Sosa Case	True crime	November 13, 2025		3 episodes	43–59 min	Spanish	

=== Reality ===
Title	Genre	Premiere	Finale	Seasons	Runtime	Language	Notes
Bling Empire	Docu-soap	January 15, 2021	October 5, 2022	3 seasons, 26 episodes	25–47 min	English	
Buried by the Bernards	Reality	February 12, 2021		1 season, 8 episodes	23–26 min	English	
The Big Day	Reality	February 14, 2021	April 7, 2021	2 collections, 6 episodes	37–45 min	English	
Canine Intervention	Reality	February 24, 2021		1 season, 6 episodes	24–35 min	English	
Marriage or Mortgage	Reality	March 10, 2021		1 season, 10 episodes	32–43 min	English	
Magic for Humans Spain	Reality	March 26, 2021		1 season, 6 episodes	22–25 min	Spanish	
Haunted: Latin America	Docu-reality	March 31, 2021		1 season, 5 episodes	26–47 min	Spanish	
The Wedding Coach	Reality	April 7, 2021		1 season, 6 episodes	31–33 min	English	
Pet Stars	Reality	April 30, 2021		1 season, 5 episodes	26–28 min	English	
Fresh, Fried and Crispy	Reality	June 9, 2021		1 season, 8 episodes	24–26 min	English	
World's Most Amazing Vacation Rentals	Reality	June 18, 2021	September 14, 2021	2 seasons, 16 episodes	31–34 min	English	
My Unorthodox Life	Docu-soap	July 14, 2021	December 2, 2022	2 seasons, 18 episodes	35–47 min	English	
Too Hot to Handle: Brazil	Dating show	July 21, 2021	October 5, 2022	2 seasons, 16 episodes	45–64 min	Portuguese	
Tattoo Redo	Reality	July 28, 2021		1 season, 6 episodes	20–29 min	English	
Bake Squad	Baking competition	August 11, 2021	January 20, 2023	2 seasons, 16 episodes	33–36 min	English	
Motel Makeover	Reality	August 25, 2021		1 season, 6 episodes	28–31 min	English	
Titletown High	Docu-soap	August 27, 2021		1 season, 8 episodes	30–35 min	English	
Sparking Joy	Reality	August 31, 2021		1 season, 3 episodes	39–45 min	Japanese	
How to Be a Cowboy	Reality	September 1, 2021		1 season, 6 episodes	22–26 min	English	
Metal Shop Masters	Reality competition	September 10, 2021		1 season, 6 episodes	31–35 min	English	
Too Hot to Handle: Latino	Dating show	September 15, 2021	September 29, 2021	1 season, 8 episodes	29–39 min	Spanish	
Jailbirds: New Orleans	Docu-reality	September 24, 2021		1 season, 3 episodes	38–42 min	English	
Baking Impossible	Baking competition	October 6, 2021	October 13, 2021	1 season, 8 episodes	47–51 min	English	
Love Is Blind: Brazil	Dating show	October 6, 2021	September 24, 2025	5 seasons, 56 episodes	27–89 min	Portuguese	
Insiders	Reality competition	October 21, 2021	May 26, 2022	2 seasons, 14 episodes	38–60 min	Spanish	
Sex, Love & goop	Docu-reality	October 21, 2021		1 season, 6 episodes	30–40 min	English	
Swap Shop	Reality	November 9, 2021	February 16, 2022	2 seasons, 12 episodes	27–33 min	English	
Love Never Lies	Dating competition	November 11, 2021	November 18, 2021	1 season, 7 episodes	47–50 min	Spanish	
New World	Reality game show	November 20, 2021	December 11, 2021	1 season, 8 episodes	60–77 min	Korean	
The Fastest	Reality competition	November 23, 2021		1 season, 6 episodes	29–42 min	Arabic	
School of Chocolate	Reality competition	November 26, 2021		1 season, 8 episodes	28–49 min	English	
Coming Out Colton	Docu-reality	December 3, 2021		1 season, 6 episodes	29–37 min	English	
The Family That Sings Together: The Camargos	Docu-reality	December 9, 2021		1 season, 5 episodes	34–47 min	Portuguese	
Twentysomethings: Austin	Docu-soap	December 10, 2021	December 17, 2021	1 season, 12 episodes	21–45 min	English	
The Hungry and the Hairy	Travel docu-comedy	December 11, 2021		1 season, 10 episodes	55–77 min	Korean	
The Future Diary	Dating show	December 14, 2021	May 31, 2022	2 seasons, 17 episodes	27–38 min	Japanese	
Selling Tampa	Reality	December 15, 2021		1 season, 8 episodes	24–40 min	English	
Hype House	Docu-soap	January 7, 2022		1 season, 8 episodes	26–36 min	English	
I Am Georgina	Docu-soap	January 27, 2022	September 18, 2024	3 seasons, 18 episodes	38–46 min	Spanish	
Love Is Blind: Japan	Dating show	February 8, 2022		1 season, 11 episodes	46–70 min	Japanese	
The Big Shot: Game Show	Reality competition	February 9, 2022		1 season, 6 episodes	45–52 min	Portuguese	
Making Fun	Reality	March 4, 2022		1 season, 8 episodes	37–43 min	English	
Byron Baes	Docu-soap	March 9, 2022		1 season, 8 episodes	35–45 min	English	
Queer Eye: Germany	Makeover reality	March 9, 2022		1 season, 5 episodes	48–52 min	German	
Life After Death with Tyler Henry	Reality	March 11, 2022		1 season, 9 episodes	37–49 min	English	
Is It Cake?	Reality game show	March 18, 2022	March 29, 2024	3 seasons, 24 episodes	35–47 min	English	
Young, Famous & African	Docu-soap	March 18, 2022	January 17, 2025	3 seasons, 24 episodes	32–55 min	English	
Bullsh*t: The Game Show	Reality game show	April 27, 2022		1 season, 10 episodes	29–39 min	English	
Iron Chef: Quest for an Iron Legend	Cooking competition	June 15, 2022		1 season, 8 episodes	46–50 min	English	
Snowflake Mountain	Survival competition	June 22, 2022		1 season, 8 episodes	31–45 min	English	
First Class	Docu-soap	June 23, 2022		1 season, 6 episodes	39–47 min	Spanish	
Pirate Gold of Adak Island	Reality	June 29, 2022		1 season, 8 episodes	25–34 min	English	
How to Build a Sex Room	Reality	July 8, 2022		1 season, 8 episodes	36–45 min	English	
Lady Tamara	Docu-reality	August 4, 2022		1 season, 6 episodes	33–42 min	Spanish	
Instant Dream Home	Reality	August 10, 2022		1 season, 8 episodes	39–47 min	English	
Iron Chef Brazil	Cooking competition	August 10, 2022		1 season, 8 episodes	45–52 min	Portuguese	
Queer Eye: Brazil	Makeover reality	August 24, 2022		1 season, 6 episodes	45–49 min	Portuguese	
Selling the OC	Docu-soap	August 24, 2022	November 12, 2025	4 seasons, 32 episodes	28–44 min	English	
Drive Hard: The Maloof Way	Reality	August 26, 2022		1 season, 8 episodes	31–34 min	English	
Buy My House	Reality	September 2, 2022		1 season, 6 episodes	29–38 min	English	
Dated & Related	Dating show	September 2, 2022		1 season, 10 episodes	30–50 min	English	
Who Likes My Follower?	Dating show	September 8, 2022		1 season, 6 episodes	45–47 min	Spanish	
Designing Miami	Reality	September 21, 2022		1 season, 8 episodes	34–43 min	English	
Iron Chef Mexico	Cooking competition	September 21, 2022		1 season, 8 episodes	46–56 min	Spanish	
Forever Queens	Docu-soap	October 2, 2022	March 19, 2024	2 seasons, 12 episodes	33–54 min	Spanish	
Easy-Bake Battle: The Home Cooking Competition	Baking competition	October 12, 2022		1 season, 8 episodes	36–40 min	English	
28 Days Haunted	Reality	October 21, 2022		1 season, 6 episodes	29–39 min	English	
Drink Masters	Reality competition	October 28, 2022		1 season, 10 episodes	35–42 min	English	
Buying Beverly Hills	Reality	November 4, 2022	March 22, 2024	2 seasons, 18 episodes	33–51 min	English	
Love Never Lies: Destination Sardinia	Dating competition	November 10, 2022	November 17, 2022	1 season, 8 episodes	45–50 min	Spanish	
Run for the Money	Reality game show	November 15, 2022		1 season, 4 episodes	49–61 min	Japanese	
Mind Your Manners	Reality	November 16, 2022		1 season, 6 episodes	28–35 min	English	
Snack vs. Chef	Reality competition	November 30, 2022		1 season, 8 episodes	28–41 min	English	
Cook at All Costs	Cooking competition	December 16, 2022		1 season, 8 episodes	33–36 min	English	
Dance Monsters	Dance competition	December 16, 2022	December 30, 2022	1 season, 8 episodes	40–49 min	English	
Summer Job	Reality competition	December 16, 2022		1 season, 8 episodes	43–47 min	Italian	
Piñata Masters	Reality competition	December 23, 2022		1 season, 7 episodes	38–48 min	Spanish	
The Ultimatum: France	Dating show	December 30, 2022	January 6, 2023	1 season, 10 episodes	34–41 min	French	
Pressure Cooker	Cooking competition	January 6, 2023		1 season, 8 episodes	40–57 min	English	
Bling Empire: New York	Docu-soap	January 20, 2023		1 season, 8 episodes	34–42 min	English	
Physical: 100	Reality competition	January 24, 2023	April 2, 2024	2 seasons, 18 episodes	51–95 min	Korean	
Love Never Lies: Poland	Dating competition	January 25, 2023	March 9, 2025	3 seasons, 23 episodes	42–75 min	Polish	
Cheat	Reality game show	March 1, 2023	March 15, 2023	1 season, 12 episodes	30–42 min	English	
Outlast	Survival competition	March 10, 2023	September 4, 2024	2 seasons, 16 episodes	28–61 min	English	
The Law of the Jungle	Survival competition	March 15, 2023		1 season, 8 episodes	40–57 min	Spanish	
Dance 100	Dance competition	March 17, 2023		1 season, 6 episodes	35–59 min	English	
The Signing	Music competition	April 4, 2023	April 12, 2023	1 season, 8 episodes	38–53 min	Spanish	
IRL – In Real Love	Dating show	April 6, 2023		1 season, 10 episodes	36–52 min	English	
Jewish Matchmaking	Reality	May 3, 2023		1 season, 8 episodes	25–39 min	English	
The Ultimatum: Queer Love	Dating show	May 24, 2023	July 2, 2025	2 seasons, 20 episodes	35–65 min	English	
Siren: Survive the Island	Survival competition	May 30, 2023	June 6, 2023	10 episodes	33–64 min	Korean	
Tex Mex Motors	Reality	June 9, 2023	November 22, 2024	2 seasons, 16 episodes	27–46 min	English	
Is She the Wolf?	Dating show	June 11, 2023	August 20, 2023	1 season, 12 episodes	34–58 min	Japanese	
Social Currency	Reality competition	June 22, 2023		1 season, 8 episodes	41–55 min	Hindi	
Deep Fake Love	Dating competition	July 6, 2023	July 13, 2023	1 season, 8 episodes	44–66 min	Spanish	
Hack My Home	Reality	July 7, 2023		1 season, 8 episodes	30–36 min	English	
Nineteen to Twenty	Dating show	July 11, 2023	August 1, 2023	1 season, 13 episodes	52–87 min	Korean	
Sugar Rush: The Baking Point	Baking competition	July 12, 2023	July 10, 2024	2 seasons, 12 episodes	49–56 min	Spanish	
The Big Nailed It Baking Challenge	Baking competition	August 4, 2023		1 season, 10 episodes	36–50 min	English	
Zombieverse	Survival game show	August 8, 2023	November 19, 2024	2 seasons, 15 episodes	40–66 min	Korean	
Surviving Paradise	Survival competition	October 20, 2023		1 season, 9 episodes	35–59 min	English	
Fame After Fame	Docu-soap	November 10, 2023	February 1, 2024	1 season, 6 episodes	32–47 min	Spanish	
Comedy Royale	Stand-up comedy competition	November 28, 2023		1 season, 6 episodes	28–39 min	Korean	
Love Like a K-Drama	Dating show	November 28, 2023	December 26, 2023	1 season, 12 episodes	38–60 min	Japanese	
The Trust: A Game of Greed	Reality game show	January 10, 2024	January 24, 2024	1 season, 8 episodes	43–61 min	English	
Love Deadline	Dating show	January 23, 2024	February 13, 2024	1 season, 10 episodes	35–63 min	Japanese	
The Magic Prank Show with Justin Willman	Magic prank show	April 1, 2024		1 season, 6 episodes	25–31 min	English	
Don't Hate the Player	Survival competition	April 17, 2024	May 1, 2024	1 season, 9 episodes	36–57 min	French	
Fight for Paradise: Who Can You Trust?	Survival competition	April 23, 2024	April 30, 2024	1 season, 8 episodes	38–49 min	German	
Super Rich in Korea	Docu-reality	May 7, 2024		1 season, 6 episodes	28–30 min	Korean	
The Ultimatum: South Africa	Dating show	May 10, 2024	May 24, 2024	1 season, 10 episodes	38–52 min	English	
Buying London	Reality	May 22, 2024		1 season, 7 episodes	28–40 min	English	
Resurrected Rides	Reality	July 24, 2024		1 season, 8 episodes	36–41 min	English	
Love Is Blind: Mexico	Dating show	August 1, 2024	August 18, 2024	1 season, 11 episodes	46–75 min	Spanish	
The Influencer	Reality competition	August 6, 2024	August 13, 2024	1 season, 7 episodes	54–81 min	Korean	
Blue Ribbon Baking Championship	Baking competition	August 9, 2024		1 season, 8 episodes	44–50 min	English	
A-List to Playlist	Music docu-reality	August 30, 2024		1 season, 8 episodes	31–81 min	Korean	
Making It in Marbella	Docu-soap	October 1, 2024		1 season, 6 episodes	23–30 min	Swedish	
Comedy Revenge	Stand-up comedy competition	October 15, 2024		1 season, 6 episodes	37–49 min	Korean	
Rhythm + Flow: Brazil	Rap music competition	November 12, 2024	November 19, 2024	1 season, 6 episodes	50–53 min	Portuguese	
Love Never Lies: South Africa	Dating competition	November 29, 2024	December 8, 2024	1 season, 8 episodes	44–81 min	English	
Rugged Rugby: Conquer or Die	Sports reality competition	December 10, 2024	January 7, 2025	1 season, 14 episodes	63–85 min	Korean	
Selling the City	Docu-soap	January 3, 2025		1 season, 8 episodes	29–44 min	English	
I Am Ilary	Docu-soap	January 9, 2025		1 season, 5 episodes	30–38 min	Italian	
W.A.G.s to Riches	Docu-soap	January 22, 2025		1 season, 8 episodes	22–44 min	English	
Celebrity Bear Hunt	Survival competition	February 5, 2025		1 season, 8 episodes	44–56 min	English	
Offline Love	Dating show	February 18, 2025		1 season, 10 episodes	47–68 min	Japanese	
With Love, Meghan	Docu-reality	March 4, 2025	August 26, 2025	2 seasons, 16 episodes	28–41 min	English	
Pop the Balloon Live	Dating show	April 10, 2025	May 29, 2025	1 season, 8 episodes	45–50 min	English	
Battle Camp	Survival competition	April 23, 2025		1 season, 10 episodes	45–59 min	English	
Cheat: Unfinished Business	Dating docu-soap	April 30, 2025		1 season, 9 episodes	38–51 min	English	
Rhythm + Flow: Poland	Rap music competition	May 14, 2025	May 28, 2025	1 season, 8 episodes	48–54 min	Polish	
Sneaky Links: Dating After Dark	Dating show	May 21, 2025		1 season, 10 episodes	48–68 min	English	
Too Hot to Handle: Spain	Dating show	June 13, 2025		1 season, 8 episodes	38–49 min	Spanish	
All the Sharks	Photography competition	July 4, 2025		1 season, 6 episodes	42–46 min	English	
Building the Band	Music competition	July 9, 2025	July 23, 2025	1 season, 10 episodes	50–67 min	English	
Too Hot to Handle: Italy	Dating show	July 18, 2025		1 season, 8 episodes	42–51 min	Italian	
Hitmakers	Music docu-reality	July 24, 2025		1 season, 6 episodes	31–52 min	English	
Final Draft	Sports reality competition	August 12, 2025		1 season, 8 episodes	33–46 min	Japanese	
Love Is Blind: France	Dating show	September 10, 2025	October 5, 2025	1 season, 10 episodes	46–69 min	French	
Next Gen Chef	Cooking competition	September 17, 2025	September 24, 2025	1 season, 8 episodes	40–53 min	English	
Inside: USA	Reality game show	September 21, 2025	September 28, 2025	1 season, 9 episodes	36–49 min	English	

=== Variety ===
Title	Genre	Premiere	Finale	Seasons	Runtime	Language	Notes
Cooking with Paris	Cooking show	August 4, 2021		1 season, 6 episodes	21–25 min	English	
Paik's Spirit	Talk show	October 1, 2021		1 season, 6 episodes	46–69 min	Korean	
Azcárate: No Holds Barred	Talk show	December 28, 2021		1 season, 4 episodes	19–21 min	Spanish	
Getting Curious with Jonathan Van Ness	Talk show	January 28, 2022		1 season, 6 episodes	25–27 min	English	
Alessandro Cattelan: One Simple Question	Talk show	March 18, 2022		1 season, 6 episodes	27–32 min	Italian	
Korea No.1	Variety show	November 25, 2022		1 season, 8 episodes	41–51 min	Korean	
10 Minute Workouts	Fitness	December 30, 2022	March 10, 2023	2 volumes, 35 episodes	8–13 min	English	
20 Minute Workouts	Fitness	December 30, 2022	March 10, 2023	2 volumes, 21 episodes	16–23 min	English	
30 Minute Workouts	Fitness	December 30, 2022	March 10, 2023	2 volumes, 30 episodes	21–31 min	English	
Bodyweight Burn	Fitness	December 30, 2022	March 10, 2023	2 volumes, 20 episodes	6–31 min	English	
Fall in Love with Vinyasa	Fitness	December 30, 2022		1 volume, 6 episodes	11–21 min	English	
Feel-Good Fitness	Fitness	December 30, 2022		1 volume, 6 episodes	7–19 min	English	
High Intensity Training	Fitness	December 30, 2022	March 10, 2023	2 volumes, 18 episodes	10–30 min	English	
Hit & Strength with Tara	Fitness	December 30, 2022		1 volume, 14 episodes	6–31 min	English	
Kickstart Fitness with the Basics	Fitness	December 30, 2022		1 volume, 13 episodes	11–30 min	English	
Two Weeks to a Stronger Core	Fitness	December 30, 2022		1 volume, 7 episodes	6–22 min	English	
Abs & Core	Fitness	March 10, 2023		1 volume, 20 episodes	6–36 min	English	
Fire & Flow	Fitness	March 10, 2023		1 volume, 12 episodes	11–24 min	English	
Fitness for Runners	Fitness	March 10, 2023		1 volume, 12 episodes	6–23 min	English	
Ignite & Inspire with Kirsty Godso	Fitness	March 10, 2023		1 volume, 18 episodes	26–23 min	English	
Kick Off with Betina Gozo	Fitness	March 10, 2023		1 volume, 12 episodes	24–36 min	English	
Lower-Body Workouts	Fitness	March 10, 2023		1 volume, 21 episodes	8–36 min	English	
Upper-Body Workouts	Fitness	March 10, 2023		1 volume, 14 episodes	11–35 min	English	
Yoga	Fitness	March 10, 2023		1 volume, 17 episodes	6–31 min	English	
Yoga with Xochilt	Fitness	March 10, 2023		1 volume, 6 episodes	6–32 min	English	
Ariyoshi Assists	Variety show	March 14, 2023		1 season, 10 episodes	38–51 min	Japanese	
Risqué Business: Japan	Talk show	April 25, 2023		1 season, 6 episodes	30–38 min	Korean	
Soccer-Inspired Workouts for All	Fitness	July 26, 2023		1 volume, 5 episodes	11–15 min	English	(Note: The show is titled Football-Inspired Workouts for All in territories outside of the United States and Canada.)
Lighthouse	Talk show	August 22, 2023		1 season, 6 episodes	30–38 min	Japanese	
Risqué Business: Taiwan	Talk show	August 29, 2023		1 season, 5 episodes	28–46 min	Korean	
Baby Gorilla Cam	Live event	September 7, 2023	September 21, 2023	1 season, 3 episodes	100–121 min	English	
Baby Animal Cam	Live event	October 12, 2023	November 2, 2023	1 season, 4 episodes	115–150 min	English	
Risqué Business: Netherlands & Germany	Talk show	February 20, 2024		1 season, 6 episodes	25–35 min	Korean	
John Mulaney Presents: Everybody's in LA	Live event/Talk show	May 3, 2024	May 10, 2024	1 season, 6 episodes	61–85 min	English	
Live from the Other Side with Tyler Henry	Paranormal activity/Talk show	September 17, 2024	April 1, 2025	1 season, 24 episodes	43–48 min	English	
Kiss or Die	Variety show	September 9, 2025		6 episodes	47–59 min	Japanese	

== Continuations ==
Title	Genre	Previous network(s)	Premiere	Finale	Seasons	Runtime	Language	Notes
Cobra Kai (seasons 3–6)	Martial arts/action comedy drama	YouTube Premium	January 1, 2021	February 13, 2025	4 seasons, 45 episodes	27–49 min	English	
Blown Away (seasons 2–4)	Reality	Makeful	January 22, 2021	March 8, 2024	3 seasons, 30 episodes	25–36 min	English	
Girl from Nowhere (season 2)	Teen mystery thriller anthology	GMM 25	May 7, 2021		1 season, 8 episodes	38–48 min	Thai	
The A List (season 2)	Teen mystery thriller	BBC iPlayer	June 25, 2021		1 season, 8 episodes	26–29 min	English	
The Mire (seasons 2–3)	Thriller	Showmax	July 7, 2021	February 28, 2024	2 seasons, 12 episodes	53–60 min	Polish	
Sexy Beasts (seasons 2–3)	Dating show	BBC Three	July 21, 2021	October 7, 2021	2 seasons, 12 episodes	22–24 min	English	
Kota Factory (seasons 2–3)	Comedy drama	TVFPlay	September 24, 2021	June 20, 2024	2 seasons, 10 episodes	31–61 min	Hindi	
Takki (season 3)	Drama	YouTube	October 28, 2021		1 season, 8 episodes	27–34 min	Arabic	
El Marginal (seasons 4–5)	Crime drama	TV Pública	January 19, 2022	May 4, 2022	2 seasons, 14 episodes	45–82 min	Spanish	
Tiger & Bunny (season 2)	Anime	Tokyo MX	April 8, 2022	October 7, 2022	1 season, 25 episodes	24–25 min	Japanese	
The Mole (seasons 6–7)	Reality competition	ABC	October 7, 2022	July 12, 2024	2 seasons, 20 episodes	34–51 min	English	
Manifest (season 4)	Supernatural drama	NBC	November 4, 2022	June 2, 2023	1 season, 20 episodes	40–50 min	English	
Girls5eva (season 3)	Comedy	Peacock	March 14, 2024		1 season, 6 episodes	24–28 min	English	
From Me to You: Kimi ni Todoke (season 3)	Anime	Nippon TV	August 1, 2024		1 season, 6 episodes	14–72 min	Japanese	
Weak Hero (season 2)	Coming-of-age action thriller	Wavve	April 25, 2025		1 season, 8 episodes	38–54 min	Korean	
Death Inc. (seasons 3–4)	Comedy	Movistar Plus+	August 21, 2025	August 7, 2026	2 seasons, 12 episodes	25–37 min	Spanish	

== Specials ==
=== One-time ===
Title	Genre	Premiere	Runtime	Language	Notes
Cobra Kai – The Afterparty	Aftershow	January 2, 2021	34 min	English	
Creating The Queen's Gambit	Making-of	January 8, 2021	14 min	English	
Bridgerton – The Afterparty	Aftershow	January 23, 2021	38 min	English	
Bling Empire – The Afterparty	Aftershow	January 30, 2021	35 min	English	
Animals on the Loose: A You vs. Wild Interactive Movie	Reality television/Interactive fiction	February 16, 2021	45 min	English	
Fate: The Winx Saga – The Afterparty	Aftershow	February 20, 2021	35 min	English	
Ginny & Georgia – The Afterparty	Aftershow	February 26, 2021	35 min	English	
The Last Kids on Earth: Happy Apocalypse to You	Animation/Interactive fiction	April 6, 2021	27 min	English	
Arlo the Alligator Boy	Animated musical comedy	April 16, 2021	1 h 32 min	English	
Dad Stop Embarrassing Me! – The Afterparty	Aftershow	April 16, 2021	37 min	English	
Shadow and Bone – The Afterparty	Aftershow	April 24, 2021	32 min	English	
The Circle – The Afterparty	Aftershow	May 7, 2021	35 min	English	
The Upshaws – The Afterparty	Aftershow	May 14, 2021	32 min	English	
Super Monsters: Once Upon a Rhyme	Animation	June 1, 2021	25 min	English	
Trese After Dark	Aftershow	June 10, 2021	35 min	English	
Headspace: Unwind Your Mind	Documentary/Interactive fiction	June 15, 2021	15 min	English	
The House of Flowers: The Movie	Comedy	June 23, 2021	1 h 27 min	Spanish	
Trollhunters: Rise of the Titans	Animated fantasy	July 21, 2021	1 h 46 min	English	
Kingdom: Ashin of the North	Period horror thriller	July 23, 2021	1 h 33 min	Korean	
You vs. Wild: Out Cold	Interactive reality	September 14, 2021	25 min	English	
A StoryBots Space Adventure	Animation	September 15, 2021	13 min	English	
Go! Go! Cory Carson: Chrissy Takes the Wheel	Animation	September 21, 2021	1 h 1 min	English	
Making The Billion Dollar Code	Making-of	October 10, 2021	28 min	English	
Sharkdog's Fintastic Halloween	Animation	October 15, 2021	24 min	English	
Johnny Test's Ultimate Meatloaf Quest	Animation/Interactive	November 16, 2021	20 min	English	
Waffles + Mochi's Holiday Feast	Cooking show	November 23, 2021	28 min	English	
StarBeam: Beaming in the New Year	Animation	December 14, 2021	47 min.	English	
Making The Witcher: Season 2	Making-of	December 17, 2021	37 min	English	
The Witcher Bestiary Season 1 Part 1	Clipshow	December 17, 2021	11 min	English	
The Witcher Bestiary Season 1 Part 2	Clipshow	December 17, 2021	10 min	English	
The Witcher: Fireplace	Yule log	December 17, 2021	59 min	English	
The Witcher Season One Recap: From the Beginning	Clipshow	December 17, 2021	15 min	English	
The Witcher: Characters of the Continent	Making-of	December 17, 2021	9 min	English	
Hilda and the Mountain King	Animation/fantasy	December 30, 2021	1 h 24 min	English	
Mighty Express: Train Trouble	Animation	January 18, 2022	25 min	English	
A Farewell to Ozark	Making-of	April 22, 2022	30 min	English	
Larva Pendant	Animation/interactive fiction	May 25, 2022	33 min	No dialogue	
Mighty Little Bheem: I Love Taj Mahal	Animation	May 30, 2022	20 min	No dialogue	
Ranveer vs. Wild with Bear Grylls	Interactive reality	July 8, 2022	1 h 10 min	English	
The Witcher Bestiary Season 2	Clipshow	August 23, 2022	19 min	English	
Jurassic World Camp Cretaceous: Hidden Adventure	Animation/Interactive fiction	November 15, 2022	32 min	English	
Making 1899	Making-of	November 17, 2022	50 min	English	
The Action Pack Saves Christmas	Animation	November 28, 2022	27 min	English	
Mighty Express: Mighty Trains Race	Animation	December 5, 2022	25 min	English	
The Boss Baby: Christmas Bonus	Animation	December 6, 2022	45 min	English	
My Next Guest with David Letterman and Volodymyr Zelenskyy	Talk show	December 12, 2022	44 min	English	
Who Killed Santa? A Murderville Murder Mystery	Crime improv comedy	December 15, 2022	52 min	English	
Making The Witcher: Blood Origin	Making-of	December 25, 2022	15 min	English	
Copenhagen Cowboy: Nightcall with Nicolas Winding Refn	Behind the scenes	January 31, 2023	27 min	English	
Making Transatlantic	Making-of	April 7, 2023	29 min	English	
The Last Kingdom: Seven Kings Must Die	Historical drama	April 14, 2023	1 h 51 min	English	
Making The Witcher: Season 3	Making-of	July 27, 2023	30 min	English	
The Bad Guys: A Very Bad Holiday	CGI animation heist comedy	November 30, 2023	25 min	English	
Making Squid Game: The Challenge	Making-of	December 7, 2023	30 min	English	
Love Is Blind Brazil: After the Altar	Aftershow	December 20, 2023	1 h 25 min	Portuguese	
Young Royals Forever	Making-of	March 18, 2024	54 min	Swedish	
My Next Guest with David Letterman and John Mulaney	Interview	April 30, 2024	46 min	English	
Baki Hanma VS Kengan Ashura	Anime martial arts	June 6, 2024	1 h 2 min	Japanese	
Bangkok Breaking: Heaven and Hell	Action-adventure	September 26, 2024	2 h 27 min	Thai	
The Bad Guys: Haunted Heist	CGI animation heist comedy	October 3, 2024	24 min	English	
Making Senna	Making-of	November 29, 2024	27 min	Portuguese	
Making The Helicopter Heist	Making-of	November 29, 2024	20 min	Swedish	
Bridgerton: Fireplace	Yule log	December 13, 2024	1 h	No dialogue	
Squid Game: Fireplace	Yule log	December 13, 2024	1 h	No dialogue	
Squid Game: Making Season 2	Making-of	January 3, 2025	27 min	Korean	
Making The Leopard	Making-of	March 21, 2025	39 min	Italian	
Behind the Curtain: Stranger Things: The First Shadow	Behind the scenes	April 15, 2025	1 h 25 min	English	
Trainwreck: The Astroworld Tragedy	Documentary	June 10, 2025	1 h 20 min	English	
Masameer Junior	Adult animation/Comedy	June 12, 2025	1 h 11 min	Arabic	
Trainwreck: Mayor of Mayhem	Documentary	June 17, 2025	49 min	English	
Trainwreck: Poop Cruise	Documentary	June 24, 2025	55 min	English	
Squid Game in Conversation	Making-of	June 27, 2025	32 min	Korean	
Trainwreck: The Cult of American Apparel	Documentary	July 1, 2025	54 min	English	
Trainwreck: The Real Project X	Documentary	July 8, 2025	48 min	English	
Trainwreck: Balloon Boy	Documentary	July 15, 2025	52 min	English	
Trainwreck: P.I. Moms	Documentary	July 22, 2025	45 min	English	
Rhythm + Flow France: After the Beat	Music competition	October 3, 2025	1 h 32 min	French	
Turn of the Tide: The Surreal Story of Rabo de Peixe	Tie-in documentary	October 17, 2025	1 h 29 min	Portuguese	
The Rats: A Witcher Tale	Fantasy drama	October 30, 2025	1 h 22 min	English	
My Next Guest with David Letterman and Adam Sandler	Interview	December 1, 2025	48 min	English	
Stranger Things: Fireplace	Yule log	December 1, 2025	1 h	No dialogue	
Wednesday: Fireplace	Yule log	December 1, 2025	1 h	No dialogue	
Unicorn Academy: Fireplace Special	Yule log	December 3, 2025	1 h	English	
With Love, Meghan: Holiday Celebration	Docu-reality	December 3, 2025	56 min	English	

=== Episodic ===
Title	Genre	Premiere	Finale	Seasons	Runtime	Language	Notes
Mighty Little Bheem: Kite Festival	Animation	January 8, 2021		1 collection, 3 episodes	6–7 min	No dialogue	
Lava Ka Dhaava	Game show	May 5, 2021		1 season, 10 episodes	24–37 min	Hindi	
Elite Short Stories: Guzmán Caye Rebe	Crime teen drama	June 14, 2021		1 season, 3 episodes	10–15 min	Spanish	
Elite Short Stories: Nadia Guzmán	Crime teen drama	June 15, 2021		1 season, 3 episodes	10–14 min	Spanish	
Elite Short Stories: Omar Ander Alexis	Crime teen drama	June 16, 2021		1 season, 3 episodes	10–14 min	Spanish	
Elite Short Stories: Carla Samuel	Crime teen drama	June 17, 2021		1 season, 3 episodes	13–16 min	Spanish	
Revelations: The Masters of the Universe Revelation Aftershow	Aftershow	July 23, 2021	November 23, 2021	1 season, 2 episodes	25 min	English	
The Ingenuity of the Househusband	Comedy	August 29, 2021	October 7, 2021	1 season, 10 episodes	3–6 min	Japanese	
Money Heist: From Tokyo to Berlin	Docu-series	September 3, 2021	December 3, 2021	2 volumes, 2 episodes	51–52 min	Spanish	
Blown Away: Christmas	Reality show	November 19, 2021		1 season, 4 episodes	28–29 min	English	
Elite Short Stories: Phillipe Caye Felipe	Crime teen drama	December 15, 2021		1 season, 3 episodes	9–16 min	Spanish	
Elite Short Stories: Samuel Omar	Crime teen drama	December 20, 2021		1 season, 3 episodes	11–12 min	Spanish	
Elite Short Stories: Patrick	Crime teen drama	December 23, 2021		1 season, 3 episodes	11–13 min	Spanish	
Karma's World Music Videos	Animation	February 24, 2022	June 16, 2022	2 volumes, 10 episodes	4–6 min	English	
CoComelon	Preschool animation	September 5, 2022	May 26, 2025	1 season, 4 episodes	63–64 min	English	
Cobra Kai: Inside the Dojo	Behind the scenes	July 18, 2024	February 13, 2025	1 season, 3 episodes	11–12 min	English	
Is It Cake? Holiday	Baking competition	November 28, 2024	November 25, 2025	2 seasons, 7 episodes	39–41 min	English	

== Regional original programming ==
These shows are originals, because Netflix commissioned or acquired them and had their premier on the service, but they are not available worldwide.

=== Animation ===
==== Kids & Family ====
Title	Premiere	Finale	Seasons	Runtime	Language	Netflix exclusive region	Notes
Ask the StoryBots Korea Edition	May 5, 2021		1 season, 8 episodes	24–27 min	Korean	Selected territories	
Transformers: BotBots	March 25, 2022		1 season, 10 episodes	24–25 min	English	Selected territories	
The Nutty Boy	October 12, 2022	April 6, 2023	1 season, 26 episodes	10–13 min	Portuguese	Selected territories	
Wake Up, Carlo!	July 6, 2023		1 season, 13 episodes	16–27 min	Portuguese	Selected territories	

=== Non-English language scripted ===
Title	Genre	Premiere	Finale	Seasons	Runtime	Language	Netflix exclusive region	Notes
Juanpis González: The Series	Comedy	January 19, 2022		1 season, 10 episodes	21–32 min	Spanish	Selected territories	
Pedal to Metal	Action	March 16, 2022		1 season, 10 episodes	34–42 min	Spanish	Selected territories	
The Final Score	Drama	November 2, 2022		1 season, 6 episodes	43–58 min	Spanish	Selected territories	
Ronja the Robber's Daughter	Coming-of-age fantasy	March 28, 2024	October 24, 2024	2 parts, 12 episodes	42–51 min	Swedish	Selected territories	
Seven Doors	Drama	December 13, 2024		1 season, 6 episodes	39–47 min	Yoruba	Selected territories	
Fugue State 1986	Crime drama	December 4, 2025		8 episodes	44–47 min	Spanish	Selected territories	

=== Co-productions ===
These shows may not be available worldwide due to the distributing deal with the co-production partner networks.

Title	Genre	Partner/Country	Premiere	Finale	Seasons	Runtime	Language	Netflix exclusive region	Notes
Under Suspicion: Uncovering the Wesphael Case	True crime	RTL-TVI/Belgium	March 17, 2021		1 season, 5 episodes	34–38 min	French	All other markets	
The Serpent	True crime	BBC One/United Kingdom	April 2, 2021		8 episodes	55–59 min	English	All other markets	
Life in Colour with David Attenborough	Nature docuseries	BBC Two/United Kingdom	April 22, 2021		3 episodes	44–50 min	English	All other markets	
Dive Club	Mystery teen drama	Network 10/Australia	September 3, 2021		1 season, 12 episodes	26–27 min	English	All other markets	
On the Verge	Comedy	Canal+/France	September 7, 2021		1 season, 12 episodes	28–35 min	English	All other markets	
Arcane	Steampunk science fantasy animation	Tencent Video/China	November 6, 2021	November 23, 2024	2 seasons, 18 episodes	39–50 min	English	All other markets	
Soil	Comedy drama	Play4/Belgium	March 17, 2022		1 season, 8 episodes	43–51 min	Dutch	Selected territories	
Borgen – Power & Glory	Political drama	DR/Denmark	April 14, 2022		1 season, 8 episodes	53–59 min	Danish	All other markets	
He's Expecting	Comedy drama	TV Tokyo/Japan	April 21, 2022		1 season, 8 episodes	25 min	Japanese	All other markets	
Surviving Summer	Teen drama	ZDF/Germany	June 3, 2022	September 15, 2023	2 seasons, 18 episodes	26–30 min	English	Selected territories	
The Perfect Mother	Crime drama	TF1/France; RTBF/Belgium; ZDF/Germany	June 3, 2022		4 episodes	46–50 min	French	All other markets	
You Don't Know Me	Crime drama	BBC One/United Kingdom	June 17, 2022		1 season, 4 episodes	54–57 min	English	All other markets	
Fakes	Young adult crime comedy	CBC Gem/Canada	September 2, 2022		1 season, 10 episodes	21–28 min	English	All other markets	
Entrapped	Thriller	RÚV/Iceland; ZDF/Germany	September 8, 2022		1 season, 6 episodes	39–52 min	Icelandic	All other markets	
I Am a Stalker	True crime docuseries	Crime + Investigation/United Kingdom	October 28, 2022		1 season, 8 episodes	43–45 min	English	All other markets	
Inside Man	Crime drama	BBC One/United Kingdom	October 31, 2022		1 season, 4 episodes	59–61 min	English	All other markets	
Reign Supreme	Music biopic	Arte/France	November 18, 2022		6 episodes	47–51 min	French	All other markets	
Irreverent	Comedy drama/Crime	Peacock/United States	December 4, 2022		1 season, 10 episodes	40–50 min	English	Selected territories	
Don't Pick Up the Phone	Docuseries	Paramount+/United Kingdom	December 14, 2022		3 episodes	42–57 min	English	All other markets	
Woman of the Dead	Crime thriller	ORF/Austria	January 5, 2023	March 10, 2025	2 seasons, 12 episodes	45–49 min	German	All other markets	
Cunk on Earth	Mockumentary	BBC Two/United Kingdom	January 31, 2023		1 season, 5 episodes	28–29 min	English	All other markets	
Red Rose	Teen horror drama	BBC Three/United Kingdom	February 15, 2023		8 episodes	37–49 min	English	All other markets	
From Me to You: Kimi ni Todoke	Romantic comedy	TV Tokyo/Japan	March 30, 2023		1 season, 12 episodes	33–35 min	Japanese	All other markets	
Rough Diamonds	Drama	VRT/Belgium	April 21, 2023		1 season, 8 episodes	47–55 min	Dutch	All other markets	
Dance Brothers	Teen drama	Yle/Finland	May 10, 2023		1 season, 10 episodes	19–25 min	Finnish	All other markets	
Tour de France: Unchained	Sports docuseries	France Télévisions/France	June 8, 2023	July 2, 2025	3 seasons, 24 episodes	34–49 min	French	All other markets	
Let's Get Divorced	Romantic comedy drama	TBS/Japan	June 22, 2023		1 season, 9 episodes	57–68 min	Japanese	Selected territories	
Five Star Chef	Cooking competition	Channel 4/United Kingdom	July 14, 2023		1 season, 6 episodes	44–46 min	English	Selected territories	
High Tides	Drama	VRT 1/Belgium	July 19, 2023	April 3, 2026	3 seasons, 26 episodes	25–38 min	Dutch	All other markets	
Predators	Nature docuseries	Sky Nature/United Kingdom	September 6, 2023		1 season, 5 episodes	43–44 min	English	Selected territories	
I Woke Up a Vampire	Family supernatural comedy thriller	Family/Canada	October 17, 2023	April 4, 2024	2 seasons, 16 episodes	23–27 min	English	Selected territories	

=== Continuations ===
Title	Genre	Previous network(s)	Premiere	Finale	Seasons	Runtime	Language	Netflix exclusive region	Notes
Power Rangers (seasons 29–30)	Superhero science fiction	Fox Kids (seasons 1–10A); ABC Kids/Jetix (seasons 10B–17); Nickelodeon (seasons 18–28)	March 3, 2022	September 29, 2023	2 seasons, 32 episodes	22–25 min	English	United States (season 29); Selected territories (season 30)	
Pernille (seasons 4–5)	Comedy drama	Viaplay	August 8, 2024	May 15, 2025	2 seasons, 12 episodes	26–31 min	Norwegian	Selected territories	

=== Specials ===
==== One-time ====
Title	Genre	Premiere	Runtime	Language	Netflix exclusive region	Notes
Bad Exorcist: Christmas Eve	Adult animated horror comedy	December 24, 2023	13 min	Polish	Poland	
Bad Exorcist: Valentine's Day	Adult animated horror comedy	February 12, 2024	12 min	Polish	Poland	
Bad Exorcist: Easter	Adult animated horror comedy	March 27, 2024	12 min	Polish	Poland	
Juanpis González: The People's President	Comedy	June 28, 2024	1 h 31 min	Spanish	Selected territories	
Bad Exorcist: First Day of School	Adult animated horror comedy	October 6, 2024	13 min	Polish	Poland	
Bad Exorcist: Ajronwejder	Adult animated horror comedy	October 23, 2024	31 min	Polish	Poland	
Bad Exorcist: All Saints' Day	Adult animated horror comedy	November 2, 2024	10 min	Polish	Poland	
Bad Exorcist: Merry Christmas	Adult animated horror comedy	December 24, 2024	11 min	Polish	Poland	
Cunk on Life	Mockumentary	January 2, 2025	1 h 11 min	English	All markets except Ireland and United Kingdom	(Note: Co-production.)
Bad Exorcist: Mushroom Picking	Adult animated horror comedy	September 25, 2025	16 min	Polish	Poland	
Bad Exorcist: St. Andrew's Eve	Adult animated horror comedy	November 29, 2025	14 min	Polish	Poland	
Bad Exorcist: New Year's Eve	Adult animated horror comedy	December 31, 2025	11 min	Polish	Poland	
