= The Houseboat =

- Genre: Documentary
- Starring: Fynn Kliemann; Olli Schulz
- Country of origin: Germany
- Original language: German
- No. of seasons: 1
- No. of episodes: 4

Production
- Running time: 29–44 minutes

Original release
- Network: Netflix
- Release: 9 March 2021

The Houseboat is a 2021 German docuseries released on Netflix on March 9, 2021, starring Fynn Kliemann and Olli Schulz.

== Cast ==
- Fynn Kliemann
- Olli Schulz

== Episodes ==
No.	Title	Original release date
1	TBA	March 9, 2021
2	TBA	March 9, 2021
3	TBA	March 9, 2021
4	TBA	March 9, 2021
