= Reasonable Doubt: A Tale of Two Kidnappings =

- Genre: True crime Documentary
- Country of origin: Mexico
- Original language: Spanish
- No. of seasons: 1
- No. of episodes: 4

Production
- Running time: 44–48 minutes

Original release
- Release: November 23, 2021

Reasonable Doubt: A Tale of Two Kidnappings is a 2021 Mexican true crime documentary miniseries, about four men who were arrested for being involved in a kidnapping following a car accident.

== Episodes ==
No.	Title	Directed by	Original release date
1	TBA	Unknown	November 23, 2021
2	TBA	Unknown	November 23, 2021
3	TBA	Unknown	November 23, 2021
4	TBA	Unknown	November 23, 2021
