= Juanpis González: The Series =

- Juanpis González: La Serie
- Genre: Sitcom
- Created by: Alejandro Riaño
- Country of origin: Colombia
- Original language: Spanish
- No. of seasons: 1
- No. of episodes: 10

Production
- Running time: 22-26 minutes
- Production company: Netflix

Juanpis González: The Series is a Colombian television sitcom starring comedian Alejandro Riaño. It is based on the fictional character created by Riaño on various social media platforms, Juanpis González. The first season consists of 10 episodes, which were released on 19 January 2022. The series stars Alejandro Riaño, Carolina Gaitán, Jairo Camargo, Julian Caicedo, and Santiago Moure.

== Cast ==
- Alejandro Riaño as Juanpis González or Juan Pablo
- Carolina Gaitán as Camila Benavides
- Jairo Camargo as Luis Carlos Pombo
- Julian Caicedo as Iván
- Marcela Agudelo as María Cristina Pombo
- Santiago Moure as Pepe Robayo

== Episodes ==
#	Title	Director	Writers	Original Air Date
1	"Total Fake News"	Rodrigo Triana and Carlos Mario Urrea	Juan Carlos Aparicio and Daniel Cúparo	January 1, 2019
2	"Not For Profit"	Rodrigo Triana	Aparicio, Cúparo, and Alejandro Riaño	January 1, 2019
3	"GeriApptric"	Rodrigo Triana	Aparicio, Cúparo, and Alejandro Riaño	January 1, 2019
4	"Auction This"	Carlos Mario Urrea	Aparicio, Cúparo, and Alejandro Riaño	January 1, 2019
5	"Daddy Issues"	Carlos Mario Urrea	Aparicio, Cúparo, and Alejandro Riaño	January 1, 2019
6	"What Happens in Anapoima..."	Carlos Mario Urrea	Aparicio, Cúparo, and Alejandro Riaño	January 1, 2019
7	"Bogota Free of Peasants"	Carlos Mario Urrea	Aparicio, Cúparo, and Alejandro Riaño	January 1, 2019
8	"The Worst Lovesick Blues in the World"	Rodrigo Triana	Aparicio, Cúparo, and Alejandro Riaño	January 1, 2019
9	"Dark Mode"			January 1, 2019
10	"Vote Finished"			January 1, 2019
