= Vendetta: Truth, Lies and the Mafia =

2021 Italian crime docuseries

- Genre: Documentary
- Starring: Silvana Saguto; Pino Maniaci; Mauro Terranova
- Country of origin: Italy
- Original languages: English; Italian
- No. of seasons: 1
- No. of episodes: 6

Production
- Running time: 33–44 minutes
- Production companies: Mon Amour Film; Nutopia

Original release
- Network: Netflix
- Release: September 24, 2021

Vendetta: Truth, Lies and The Mafia is a 2021 docuseries starring Silvana Saguto, Pino Maniaci and Mauro Terranova.

== Cast ==
- Silvana Saguto
- Pino Maniaci
- Mauro Terranova
- Bartolomeo Parrino
- Letizia Maniaci
- Patrizia Marchione
- Lorenzo Caramma
- Antonio Ingroia
- Amelia Luise
- Giovanni Maniaci
- Gioacchino De Luca
- Guy Richardson
- Pietro Cavallotti
- Giuseppe Panettino
- Matteo Renzi
- Vittorio Saguto
- Elias Argentiere
- Vincenzo Cavallotti
- Elias
- Maria Teresa Saguto

== Release ==
Vendetta: Truth, Lies and The Mafia was released on September 24, 2021, on Netflix.
