= Missing: Dead or Alive? =

2023 television series

Missing: Dead or Alive? is a television series on Netflix.

== Episodes ==
Season	Episodes	Originally released
1	4	May 10, 2023
2	4	November 24, 2025

=== Season 1 (2023) ===
No. overall	No. in season	Title	Original release date	Prod. code
1	1	"Episode 1"	May 10, 2023	1MDA01
When police search the home of missing person Lorraine Garcia, they find concerning details that prompt them to question her son, an Iraq War veteran.
2	2	"Episode 2"	May 10, 2023	1MDA02
When 10-year-old Amirah Watson disappears with her mother after a weekend visit, a family history of custody battles has police unsure of whom to trust.
3	3	"Episode 3"	May 10, 2023	1MDA03
David Taylor's truck is found abandoned on the side of the interstate — but David, his phone and a $10,000 winning lottery ticket are nowhere to be seen.
4	4	"Episode 4"	May 10, 2023	1MDA04
When 17-year-old Sierra Stevens doesn't return home after going to the movies, police fear she might have fallen prey to sex trafficking — or worse.

=== Season 2 (2025) ===
No. overall	No. in season	Title	Original release date	Prod. code
5	1	"Episode 1"	November 24, 2025	2MDA01
A worried mom's phone call sets off a search for a man who lives at an apartment complex that's been taken over by criminals.
6	2	"Episode 2"	November 24, 2025	2MDA01
Morgan's neighbors point investigators toward a man with a lengthy rap sheet. He grudgingly provides a clue that confirms Vicki's earlier suspicions.
7	3	"Episode 3"	November 24, 2025	2MDA01
A young woman vanishes from a motel at 2:30 a.m., her phone goes straight to voicemail — and security video catches a man getting into a car with her.
8	4	"Episode 4"	November 24, 2025	2MDA01
Days after her disappearance, surveillance footage from a gas station shows the vehicle Shandon was seen driving and a woman trying to use her bank card.
