= Under Suspicion: Uncovering the Wesphael Case =

- Genre: Crime Drama
- Created by: Georges Huercano; Pascal Vrebos
- Directed by: Alain Brunard
- Starring: Nadine Pirotton; Bernard Sohet; Bernard Wesphael
- Country of origin: Belgium
- Original languages: English; French
- No. of series: 1
- No. of episodes: 5

Original release
- Network: RTL-TVI/Belgium
- Release: 17 March 2021

Under Suspicion: Uncovering the Wesphael Case is a Belgian crime drama television serial directed by Alain Brunard, created by Georges Huercano and Pascal Vrebos and starring Nadine Pirotton, Bernard Sohet and Bernard Wesphael. The five-part limited series is a co-production between RTL-TVI, Belgium and Netflix.

== Cast ==
- Nadine Pirotton
- Bernard Sohet
- Bernard Wesphael
- Luc Gochel
- Jean-Philippe Mayence
- Vincent Demonty
- Marc Metdepenningen
- Jean Thiel
- Patrice 'Topy' Dullens
- Diego Smessaert
- Ignacio de la Serna
- Jan Cordonnier
- Tom Bauwens
- Romuald Servranckx
- Oswald De Cock
