= I Am a Stalker =

2022 true crime docuseries

- Promotional poster
- Genre: Docuseries
- Country of origin: United Kingdom
- No. of seasons: 1
- No. of episodes: 8

Production
- Producers: Zoe Hines; Ned Parker; Danny Tipping
- Running time: 43-45 minutes
- Production company: Transistor Films

Original release
- Network: Netflix
- Release: 28 October 2022

I Am a Stalker is a British true crime television docuseries. It features a series of interviews with convicted stalkers and their survivors who share their first-hand accounts of what happened. The series was released on October 28, 2022 on Netflix.

== Episodes ==
No.	Title	Original release date
1	"Pattern of Behavior"	October 28, 2022
Daniel Thompson stalked three women he was in romantic relationships with, including his ex-wife; James Vail, his fourth victim, was dating the third woman he stalked. Vail was murdered in the bed of Thompson’s ex-partner. Vail’s mother, Bonnie, and his ex-wife, Angelyn, bonded over the violence he introduced into their lives.
2	"One Last Chance"	October 28, 2022
After his stepson Gauge died in an accident, John Anderson began abusing methamphetamine before he began cheating on, then abusing his partner Rachel. When she escaped with their infant son to live with family, John began trying to find her and, when he was unsuccessful, he sent increasingly more disturbing texts to Rachel, including videos where he purportedly flushed the cremains of Gauge down a toilet. These texts helped Rachel receive an order of protection against him. John had a history of violent and controlling behavior for over a decade prior to his relationship with Rachel, including being charged with aggravated stalking in 2010.
3	"A Family Stalked"	October 28, 2022
4	"Close to Death"	October 28, 2022
5	"Imminent Fear"	October 28, 2022
6	"Extreme Best Friends"	October 28, 2022
7	"Red Flags"	October 28, 2022
8	"Obsessive Tendencies"	October 28, 2022
includes commentary from Will Worsham
