= Human Playground =

Netflix original docuseries

- Genre: Docuseries
- Created by: Hannelore Vandenbussche
- Written by: Hannelore Vandenbussche
- Directed by: Tomas Kaan
- Narrated by: Idris Elba
- Composer: Alexander Reumers
- Original language: English
- No. of seasons: 1
- No. of episodes: 6

Production
- Producer: Lea Fels
- Running time: 36-43 minutes
- Production companies: Scenery; Totem Media

Human Playground is a Netflix original docuseries created by Hannelore Vandenbussche and narrated by Idris Elba. It explores several different unique and extreme sports "played" by different cultures around the world. It was released on September 30, 2022.
