= Marriage or Mortgage =

- Genre: Reality show
- Country of origin: United States
- Original language: English
- No. of seasons: 1
- No. of episodes: 10

Production
- Running time: 32–43 minutes

Original release
- Network: Netflix
- Release: March 10, 2021

Marriage or Mortgage is a reality television series that aired on Netflix on March 10, 2021.

== Cast ==
- Elliot Schiff
- Brittany Williams
- Precious Styles Bullard
- Scott Williams
- Alex Bullard
- Dorothy Bullard
- Nichole Holmes
- Sarah Miller
