= Stories of a Generation – with Pope Francis =

- Genre: Documentary
- Country of origin: Italy
- Original language: English
- No. of seasons: 1
- No. of episodes: 4

Production
- Running time: 44–49 minutes

Original release
- Release: December 25, 2021

Stories of a Generation – with Pope Francis is a 4-part 2021 documentary miniseries.

== Episodes ==
Episode 1 includes conversations with Pope Francis, Martin Scorsese, Jane Goodall and others, as they explore on the power of love in their life stories.

No.	Title	Directed by	Original release date
1	"Love"	Unknown	December 25, 2021
2	"Dream"	Unknown	December 25, 2021
3	"Struggle"	Unknown	December 25, 2021
4	"Work"	Unknown	December 25, 2021

== Release ==
Stories of a Generation – with Pope Francis was released on December 25, 2021, on Netflix.
