= The Book of Queer =

2022 television series

- Genre: Documentary
- Country of origin: United States
- Original language: English
- No. of episodes: 5

Production
- Executive producers: Eric Cervini; Colin Hargraves; Annie Price
- Producer: Ivan Kraljevic
- Production company: B17 Entertainment

Original release
- Network: Discovery+
- Release: June 2, 2022

The Book of Queer is a Discovery+ five-part series created by Eric Cervini about LGBTQ historical figures, which premiered in June 2022.

Guest narrators for the series include comedian Margaret Cho; actress Dominique Jackson; actors Alex Newell and Leslie Jordan; and television personality Ross Mathews. Actress Juliana Joel portrayed Sylvia Rivera.

== Accolades ==
Year	Award	Category	Nominee(s)	Result	Ref.
2023	Daytime Creative Arts & Lifestyle Emmy Awards	Outstanding Educational and Informational Program	Rhett Bachner, Eric Cervini, Wendy L. Douglas, Colin Hargraves, Howard Lee, Brien Meagher, Alon Orstein, Annie Price, Jason Sarlanis, Lindsay Raby	Nominated	
2023	Daytime Creative Arts & Lifestyle Emmy Awards	Outstanding Casting	Lesley Wolff, Michael Tartaglia, Nate McLeod, Eric Cervini, Colin Hargraves, Annie Price	Nominated	
2023	Daytime Creative Arts & Lifestyle Emmy Awards	Outstanding Costume Design/Styling	Karis Wilde	Nominated	
2023	Daytime Creative Arts & Lifestyle Emmy Awards	Outstanding Multiple Camera Editing	Jen Woodhouse, Esteban Argüello, Colin Hargraves, Tiffany Risucci, Aaron Paul Rogers, Jennifer Roth, Lori Szybist, Simon Tondeur, Bryn Vytlacil	Won	
2023	Daytime Creative Arts & Lifestyle Emmy Awards	Outstanding Main Title and Graphic Design	Neil Garguilo, Jess Furman, Colin Hargraves, Gregory James Jenkins, DL Guerra, Ben Stoddard, Federico Laboureau, Felipe Lazaro	Nominated	
2023	Daytime Creative Arts & Lifestyle Emmy Awards	Outstanding Writing Team for a Daytime Non-Fiction Program	Eric Cervini, Rebecca Donohue, Kathryn Doyle, Lyndon Henley Hanrahan, Colin Hargraves, Annie Price, Claudia Restrepo, Michael Shayan, Tien Tran, Robin Tran, Lauren Walker	Nominated	
