= 50th Daytime Creative Arts & Lifestyle Emmy Awards =

- Date: December 16, 2023
- Location: Westin Bonaventure Hotel; Los Angeles, California, U.S.
- Presented by: National Academy of Television Arts and Sciences (NATAS)
- Most awards: The Kelly Clarkson Show and Island of the Sea Wolves (4)
- Most nominations: The Kelly Clarkson Show (9)

Television/radio coverage
- Network: Watch.TheEmmys.TV

The 50th Annual Daytime Creative Arts Emmy Awards, presented by the National Academy of Television Arts and Sciences (NATAS), honored the best in US daytime television programming in 2022. The award ceremony was originally planned to be held on June 17, 2023, at the Westin Bonaventure Hotel in Los Angeles, but was postponed to December 16 due to the 2023 Hollywood labor disputes.

The nominations were announced on April 26, 2023, alongside the nominees for the main ceremony categories. Syndicated talk show The Kelly Clarkson Show received the most creative arts nominations with nine, followed by Island of the Sea Wolves with seven, and The Bold and the Beautiful and Book of Queer with six each.

The ceremony was streamed on the NATAS OTT channel at Watch.TheEmmys.TV.

== Winners and nominees ==
The nominations for both the 50th Daytime Emmy Awards and the 50th Daytime Creative Arts & Lifestyle Emmy Awards were announced on April 26, 2023.

=== Programming ===
Programming
Outstanding Culinary Series: José Andrés and Family in Spain (Discovery+); Family Dinner (Magnolia Network); Martha Cooks (Roku); Roadfood: Discovering America One Dish at a Time (GBH); Selena + Chef (HBO Max)	Outstanding Lifestyle Program: Eat This with Yara (AJ+); For the Love of Kitchens (Magnolia Network); George to the Rescue (NBC); Life After Death with Tyler Henry (Netflix); Mind Your Manners (Netflix); The Established Home (Magnolia Network)
Outstanding Travel, Adventure and Nature Program: Wild Babies (Netflix); Down to Earth with Zac Efron (Netflix); Guy's All-American Road Trip (Food Network); The Hidden Lives of Pets (Netflix); Island of the Sea Wolves (Netflix); Reel Destinations (Focus Features)	Outstanding Instructional and How-To Program: Instant Dream Home (Netflix); Amanda Gorman Teaches Writing and Performing Poetry (MasterClass); Fixer Upper: The Castle (Magnolia Network); Idea House: Mountain Modern (Roku); Martha Gardens (Roku)
Outstanding Arts and Popular Culture Program: Variety Power of Women: Changemakers (Lifetime); American Anthems (PBS); Kings of Leon @ O2 (Veeps); My Bluegrass Story (RFD-TV); Variety Studio: Actors on Actors (PBS); Working in the Theatre (AmericanTheatreWing.org)	Outstanding Daytime Special: Recipe for Change: Standing up to Anti-Semitism (YouTube Originals); 96th Annual Macy's Thanksgiving Day (NBC); All Boys Aren't Blue (Amazon Prime Video); Behind The Table: A View Reunion (Hulu); Disney Parks Magical Christmas Day (ABC); Extra: Cheslie Kryst 1991–2022 (Syndicated); The House that Norm Built (PBS / Roku)
Outstanding Short Form Daytime Program: My Mark featuring Marcus Samuelsson (Condé Nast / Bon Appétit); Asian American Stories of Resilience and Beyond (WORLD Channel); Dressed (Focus Features); Finding Pause (Healthline); Handmade (YouTube); Ready Jet Cook (Food Network)	Outstanding Educational and Informational Program: Italy Made with Love (PBS); Book of Queer (Discovery+); The Earth Unlocked (The Weather Channel); The Future Of (Netflix); Harlem Globetrotters Play It Forward (NBC); Historian's Take (PBS); Vikings: The Rise and Fall (National Geographic)
Outstanding Promotional Announcement: The Drew Barrymore Show: "Drew's Got the Beat" (Syndicated); Access Hollywood: "Tow Yard" (Syndicated); The Jennifer Hudson Show: "EGOT, Hope, and Joy, and Magic" (Syndicated); Sherri!: "Sherri: Fun. Joy. Laughter." (Syndicated); Tamron Hall: "Women Reclaiming Their Power: Michelle Branch & Angela Simmons" (Syndicated)

=== Crafts ===
Crafts
Outstanding Art Direction/Set Decoration/Scenic Design: The View – Mark Erbaugh (ABC); General Hospital – Jennifer Elliott, Andrew Evashchen (ABC); The Kelly Clarkson Show – James Pearse Connelly, David Eckert, Kevin Grace (Syndicated); The Talk – Matt Tognacci, Stephen Paul Fackrell (CBS); The Young and the Restless – David Hoffmann, Jennifer Savala, Maria Dirolf, Jennifer Haybach, Monica Lowe, Justine Mercado (CBS)	Outstanding Casting: General Hospital – Mark Teschner, Lisa Booth (ABC); Book of Queer – Lesley Wolff, Michael Tartaglia, Nate McLeod, Eric Cervini, Colin Hargraves, Annie Price (Discovery+); Days of Our Lives – Marnie Saitta, Bob Lambert (NBC / Peacock); Start Up – Jenny Feterovich (PBS); The Young and the Restless – Nancy Nayor, Greg Salmon (CBS)
Outstanding Cinematography: Island of the Sea Wolves – Russell Clark, Samuel Ellis, James Frystak, Maxwel Hohn, Matthew Hood, Kieran O'Donovan, Dave Pearson, Adam Ravetech, Robin Smith and Darren West (Netflix); The Hidden Lives of Pets – Brian McGinty, Jeffrey Alexander, Simon Fanthorpe, Simon Fox, Andrew Goldie, Richard Hughes, Yan Ionov, Andreas Knausenberger, Trevor Smith, Peter Thorn, Zheng Yi (Netflix); Home – Charlie Balch, Michael Bozzo, Denny Chrisna, Josh Flavell, Chris Gill, Patrick Lavaud, Jeremy Leach, Jurgen Lisse, Pierre DeVilliers (Apple TV+); Italy Made with Love – Thomas Jacobi, Filippo Chiesa, Luca Dal Lago, Patrick Greene (PBS); Wild Babies – Nick Ball, Ralph Bower, Samantha Davies, Russell MacLaughlin (Netflix)	Outstanding Costume Design/Styling: The Bold and the Beautiful – Jeresa Featherstone, Renee V. Brunson, Anabel Shuckhart, Shirin Enayati, Tayo Fajemisin, Lucy Flores, Ross Fuentes, Jennifer Johns, Patrice Johnson, Gail Mosley, Angelo Santos (CBS); Book of Queer – Karis Wilde (Discovery+); General Hospital – Shawn Reeves, William H. Hoffman Jr, Julianna Bolles Morrison, Maki Chaudhuri, Elizabeth Jerome, Margaret Lousen, Christine Shahverdian, Maria Uribe, Alice Volonino, Asante Wa Young (ABC); Sherri! – Willie Sinclair III, Chanel Smith (Syndicated); The Jennifer Hudson Show – Verneccia Étienne, Jacey Stamler, Tiffany McPherson, Layla Witmer (Syndicated)
Outstanding Daytime Program Host: Mike Corey – Uncharted Adventure (The Weather Channel); Danielle Brooks – Instant Dream Home (Netflix); Zac Efron – Down to Earth with Zac Efron (Netflix); Kevin O'Connor – This Old House (PBS / Roku); Martha Stewart – Martha Gardens (Roku)	Outstanding Hairstyling and Makeup: Red Table Talk – Neeko Abriol, Steven Aturo, Leann Hirsh (Facebook Watch); The Bold and the Beautiful – Stephanie Paugh, Karlye Buff, Danielle Dubinsky, Alexis Reyes, Christine Lai Johnson, Hajja Barnes, James Elle, Dan Crawley (CBS); The Jennifer Hudson Show – Albert Morrison, Robear Landeros, Adam Burrell, Marie-Flore Beaubien (Syndicated); The Kelly Clarkson Show – Tara Copeland, Robert Ramos, Chanty Lagrana, Valente Frazier, Gloria Elias-Foeillet (Syndicated); Sherri! – Theo Barrett, Jaime Jose Alcivar Jr., Lateasha Boone, Irving Ramirez, Sydney Smith, Rodney Jon, Yanira Garcia, Jamie Harper, Latrice Johnson, Diana Mota, Jai Williams, Raquel Vivve (Syndicated); Tamron Hall – Jessica Smalls, Jonathon Wright, Akeesha Edwards, Daniel Koye, Raul Otero, Natasha Denis, Aeriel Payne, Billie Gene (Syndicated)
Outstanding Directing Team for a Single Camera Daytime Non-Fiction Program: Home – Katy Chevigny, Lebogang Rasethaba (Apple TV+); Ask This Old House – Katie Buckley, Sarah Chasse, Stephen Hussar, Nick Kolinsky, Jay Maurer, Tom Robertson (PBS / Roku); Big Sky Kitchen with Eduardo Garcia – Anne Fox (Magnolia Network); Island of the Sea Wolves – Jeff Turner, Chelsea Turner (Netflix); Wild Babies – Gemma Brandt, Sally Cryer (Netflix)	Outstanding Directing Team for a Multiple Camera Daytime Non-Fiction Program: The Kelly Clarkson Show – Joe Terry, Diana Horn, Callan Chapman, Chris Hines, Ran Lowe (Syndicated); American Anthems – Wes Edwards (PBS); The Drew Barrymore Show – Adam Heydt, Scot Titelbaum, Sara Tannor, Veda Carey, Liz Keane, Kyle Ramdeen (Syndicated); Entertainment Tonight – Brian Campbell, Brad Magon, John Kornarens (Syndicated); The View – Sarah de la O, Janean Elkins, John Keegan, Craig Viechec, Christopher Wayne, Rob Bruce Baron, Paul Tarascio, Steven Van Patten (ABC)
Outstanding Single Camera Editing: Island of the Sea Wolves – Erin Cumming, Jacob Parish, Steve Phillips, Jeanne Slater (Netflix); Big Sky Kitchen with Eduardo Garcia – John Silva, Kristine Gaffney, Nicholas Stich (Magnolia Network); The Hidden Lives of Pets – Niels Bellinger, Richard Lace (Netflix); Home – Tim Clancy, Amanda Estremera, Mari Keiko Golzalez, Derek Kicker, Mohamed El Manasterly, Aaron Naar, Erin Nordstrom, Shelly Stocking, Aaron Vandenbroucke (Apple TV+); Wild Babies – Steve Barnes, Darren Flaxstone, Catherine Hunter, Robin Lewis, Khara Stibbons, Andy Sutton (Netflix)	Outstanding Multiple Camera Editing: Book of Queer – Jen Woodhouse, Esteban Argüello, Colin Hargraves, Tiffany Risucci, Aaron Paul Rogers, Jennifer Roth, Lori Szybist, Simon Tondeur, Bryn Vytlacil (Discovery+); Articulate with Jim Cotter – Tom Contarino, Ryan Savage, Christine Walden, Mark Miller (PBS); Behind The Table: A View Reunion – Jamie Pilarski, Rich Provost (Hulu); Emeril Cooks – Austin Andries, William Doyle, Ronnie Polidoro, Allie Straim, Drew Stubbs (Roku); The Kelly Clarkson Show – Sam Goldfien, Casey O'Brien, Justin Curran, Stas Lipovetskiy, Klifford Svatos (Syndicated); Rachael Ray – Anna George, John Andrisano, Ernie Generalli, Richard Kronenberg, Elizabeth Murray, Michael Orso, Jason Williams (Syndicated)
Outstanding Music Direction and Composition: Home – Christopher Bear, BJ Burton, Garron Chang, Demián Gálvez, Amanda Jones, Camilo Lara, Aska Matsumiya, Ali Shaheed Muhammad, Cali Wang, Adrian Younge (Apple TV+); The Bold and the Beautiful – John Nordstrom, Jack Allocco, Bradley P. Bell, David Kurtz, Lothar Struff (CBS); The Hidden Lives of Pets – Ben Parsons (Netflix); Island of the Sea Wolves – Laurentia Editha, Denise Santos (Netflix); The Kelly Clarkson Show – Jason Halbert (Syndicated)	Outstanding Original Song: American Anthems: "Life is Sweet" – Jennifer Nettles, Bill Sherman (PBS); General Hospital: "Darling Darling" – William Lipton (ABC); The Bold and the Beautiful: "Everyone Dances" – Bradley P. Bell, Matt Pavolaitis, Anthony Ferrari, Casey Kaspryzyk (CBS); American Anthems: "Pocket Change" – Lee Brice, Billy Montana, Adam Wood (PBS); Joni Table Talk: "Only There" – Rachel Lamb Brown, Joni Lamb, Rebecca Lamb Weiss, Joshua Brown (Daystar)
Outstanding Lighting Direction: The Kelly Clarkson Show – Darren Langer (Syndicated); The Bold and the Beautiful – Brent Conner (CBS); The Drew Barrymore Show – Bob Barnhart, Dave Grill, Shawn Kaufman (Syndicated); General Hospital – Robert Bessoir, Melanie Mohr, George Webster (ABC); The View – James Gallagher (ABC)	Outstanding Technical Direction, Camera Work, Video: The Kelly Clarkson Show – Tom Henson, Dean Andersen, Ralph Bolton, Drew Jansen, Dick Mort, Richard Pitpit, Eric Taylor, Wade Bobbitt (Syndicated); The Bold and the Beautiful – Gary Chamberlin, Laurence Chun, Keven Scotti, Michael Hardiman, Jack Kidd Jr., John H. Carlson, Kai Kim, Nick Krotov, Joseph Stephenson, Nicholas Svoboda, George Forbes (CBS); Disney Parks Magical Christmas Day – Ken Ash, Bil Avzaradel, Brad Boneville, Rick Siegel, James Coker, Chris Sullivan, Scott Acosta, Ryan Balton, Manny Bonilla, Deb Brozina, Austin Castelo, Chris Ferguson, Jorge Ferris, Ricky Fonatnez, Daniel Hagouel, Travis Hays, Tom Hildreth, Ronnen Horovitz, Randy Huggins, Helena Jackson, Josh Kappers, Jeff Kearney, Dee Nichols, Jill Sager, Joe Victoria, Rob Vuona, Fred Wetherbee (ABC); The Jennifer Hudson Show – JD Orozco, Jay Alarcon, Forrest "Chip" Fraser, Jeremy Freeman, Nate Payton, Paul Wileman, Chuck Reilly, Charles Silas (Syndicated); The Talk – Vic Caruso, George Aponte, Ron Barnes, Zeke Hernandez, Ed Horton, Jeff Johnson, Art Taylor, Brad Zerbst, Tim Gamble (CBS); The View – Rene Butler, Eric Gruszecki, John Kokinis, Andrew Capuano, David Dainoff, Michael Danisi, Nick Davis, Danato De Pasquale, Nick Fayo, Rob Feder, Manny Gutierrez, Anthony Ioannou, Gary Jelaso, Hardy Kluender, Douglas Schneider (ABC); The Young and the Restless – Michael Hoorn, Andrew Clark, Luis Godinez Jr., Josh Llorico, William Looper, Roberto Bosio, Thomas Luth (CBS)
Outstanding Live Sound Mixing and Sound Editing: The Kelly Clarkson Show – Jim Slanger, Bob Lewis, Eddie Marquez, Robert Venable, Danny Cruz, Jeff Hickman, Eddie Marquez, Kevin Shannon, Jennifer Vannoy-Rounsaville (Syndicated); Days of Our Lives – Nick Kleissas, Kevin Church, Jon Amirkhan, Michael Flamingo, Marko Fox, Joseph Lumer, Holly Metts, Jenée Muyeau, Erwin Castillo, Lugh Powers, Victoria Luckey, Stu Rudolph, Harry Young (NBC / Peacock); The Ellen DeGeneres Show – Mike Stock, Dirk Sciarrotta, Liza Tan, Ron Thompson, Liz Cabral, Tig Moore, Philip A. Gebhardt (Syndicated); The Jennifer Hudson Show – Mike Stock, Liz Cabral, Tig Moore, Josue Pena, Philip A. Gebhardt, Marilyn Loud, Ron Thompson (Syndicated); The Young and the Restless – Andrzej Warzocha, Dean Johnson, Malcolm Arnold, Kathryn Hammond, Joseph Lawrence, Thomas Luth (CBS)	Outstanding Sound Mixing and Sound Editing: Island of the Sea Wolves – Jonny Crew, Kate Hopkins, Ben Peace, Hannah Gregory, Tyson Lozensky, Nicholas Allan, Tom Mercer, Luke O’Connell, Owen Peter, Harsha Thangirala, Paul Ackerman, Rory Joseph and Ellie Bowle (Netflix); Car Masters: Rust to Riches – Joe Beachy, John Reese (Netflix); Down to Earth with Zac Efron – Joe Hernandez, Stacey Hempel, Lee Walker (Netflix); The Hidden Lives of Pets – Greg Gettens, Kim Tae Hak (Netflix); Home – Eric Arajol Burgues, Francis Byrne, Benjamin Le Calvé, Gijs Domen, David Fournier, Orion Gordon, Arni Gylfa, Roy Marasigan, David Montero, Sri Wahyuni Retnowati, David Seapose, Nico Tripaldi, Freek Vrijhof, Ikabl Wahyukin, Colin Moran (Apple TV+); Wild Babies – Harry Hills, Shola Phil-Ebosié, Ben Wood, Matt Coster (Netflix)
Outstanding Main Title and Graphic Design: Down to Earth with Zac Efron – Jeremy Samples (Netflix); Book of Queer – Neil Garguilo, Jess Furman, Colin Hargraves, Gregory James Jenkins, DL Guerra, Ben Stoddard, Federico Laboureau, Felipe Lazaro (Discovery+); Car Masters: Rust to Riches – Brandon Thomas Irwin, Kimberly Hager (Netflix); The Drew Barrymore Show – Jeremy Samples (Syndicated); Instant Dream Home – Ryan Valdez (Netflix)	Outstanding Writing Team for a Daytime Non-Fiction Program: Island of the Sea Wolves – David Fowler, James Honeyborne and Jeff Turner (Netflix); Book of Queer – Eric Cervini, Rebecca Donohue, Kathryn Doyle, Lyndon Henley Hanrahan, Colin Hargraves, Annie Price, Claudia Restrepo, Michael Shayan, Tien Tran, Robin Tran, Lauren Walker (Discovery+); The Drew Barrymore Show – Cristina Kinon, Chelsea White (Syndicated); The Ellen DeGeneres Show – Alison Balian, Gil Rief, Grace Anaclerio, Jamie Brunton, Ellen DeGeneres, Brian Kiley, Rick Mitchell, Troy Andrew Thomas, Michael Tiberi (Syndicated); The Kelly Clarkson Show – Jordan Watland, Nik Robinson, Kevin Hurley, Gina Sprehe (Syndicated)

=== Hosting ===
Hosting
Outstanding Culinary Show Host
- Justin Sutherland – Taste the Culture (tbs / TNT / truTV)
  - Kardea Brown – Delicious Miss Brown (Food Network)
  - Ina Garten – Be My Guest with Ina Garten: Seasons 1-2 (Food Network)
  - Guy Fieri – Guy's Ranch Kitchen (Food Network)
  - Emeril Lagasse – Emeril Cooks (Roku)
  - Andrew Zimmern – Family Dinner (Magnolia Network)

=== Nominations and wins by program ===
Shows with multiple Creative Arts nominations
Nominations	Show	Network
9	The Kelly Clarkson Show	Syndicated
7	Island of the Sea Wolves	Netflix
6	The Bold and the Beautiful	CBS
6	Book of Queer	Discovery+
5	The Drew Barrymore Show	Syndicated
5	The Jennifer Hudson Show	Syndicated
5	Home	Apple TV+
5	General Hospital	ABC
5	Wild Babies	Netflix
5	The Hidden Lives of Pets	Netflix
4	The Young and the Restless	CBS
4	Down to Earth with Zac Efron	Netflix
4	The View	ABC
4	American Anthems	PBS
3	Sherri!	Syndicated
3	Instant Dream Home	Netflix
2	Tamron Hall	Syndicated
2	The Talk	CBS
2	Car Masters: Rust to Riches	Netflix
2	The Ellen DeGeneres Show	Syndicated
2	Days of Our Lives	NBC / Peacock
2	Big Sky Kitchen with Eduardo Garcia	Magnolia Network
2	Disney Parks Magical Christmas Day	ABC
2	Behind The Table: A View Reunion	Hulu
2	Martha Gardens	Roku
2	Italy Made with Love	PBS
