= George Verschoor =

American television producer

- Born: 1960 (age 65–66); United States
- Occupations: Television director; writer; producer

George Verschoor is an Emmy-winning American television showrunner, director, producer, and creator widely regarded as one of the pioneering architects of modern unscripted television. Over a career spanning more than four decades, Verschoor has played a foundational role in shaping the reality television genre, creating and developing influential formats, launching major talent, and introducing storytelling techniques that have become industry standards.

== Career ==
Verschoor first gained prominence as developer, showrunner and director of the first four seasons of MTV's groundbreaking series The Real World, which launched the modern non-fiction genre and is one of the longest-running reality programs in history. While directing the early seasons, Verschoor created many of the storytelling devices that now define the genre, including the "confessional" interview camera technique, a direct-to-camera storytelling device that remains a staple of unscripted television.

Following The Real World, Verschoor continued to push the boundaries of nonfiction storytelling across multiple genres. He executive produced and directed MTV's Fear, where he created the immersive “Fear Camera” system and co-created and ran Fox’s boundary-pushing hybrid mystery series Murder in Small Town X, which was one of the first to blend serialized scripted narrative with real-world participant experience.

Verschoor co-created and served as showrunner of the music competition series Nashville Star, which ran for six seasons and helped launch the careers of several prominent country music artists, including Miranda Lambert and Kacey Musgraves. He later served as executive producer and showrunner on ABC’s hit Extreme Makeover: Home Edition and Fox’s Home Free.

Through an overall production relationship with National Geographic Channel, Verschoor executive produced the investigative series Border Wars and co-created the adventure docuseries Die Trying, which featured adventurers such as Alex Honnold, and the off-the-grid construction series Building Wild. In the streaming era, he has been a frequent collaborator with Netflix, serving as creator and executive producer of the Emmy-winning Instant Dream Home, one of the platform’s global Top 10 series, as well as creator and showrunner of The World’s Most Amazing Vacation Rentals and Stay Here. He also served as consulting producer on multiple seasons of Paramount+’s The Real World Homecoming.

Verschoor also executive produced and was showrunner of the long-running ABC hit series Extreme Makeover: Home Edition. He also executive produced the David Lynch Foundation's star-studded charity benefit Change Begins Within for PBS, featuring a reunion of the two surviving Beatles, Sir Paul McCartney and Ringo Starr.

Verschoor executive produced and directed other successful television series, including the scripted comedies Austin Stories, Howard Stern's Son of the Beach, and Blowin' Up starring Jamie Kennedy. He also executive produced the award-winning National Geographic documentary film Death on the Mountain: the Women of K2.

Verschoor is the founder and President of Hoosick Falls Productions, based in Santa Monica, CA. He currently serves on the advisory board of the S.I. Newhouse School of Public Communications at Syracuse University, the board of directors for the Woodstock Academy of Music, and is an executive producer with David Lynch Foundation Television.

== Productions ==
Production	Role	Network	Year
Instant Dream Home	Creator, Executive Producer	Netflix	2022
The World's Most Amazing Vacation Rentals	Creator, Executive Producer	Netflix	2021
Stay Here	Creator, Executive Producer	Netflix	2018
Home Free (2015 TV series)	Executive Producer	Fox	2015
Building Wild	Creator, Executive Producer	Nat Geo	2014
Die Trying	Creator, Executive Producer	Nat Geo	2014
Border Wars	Executive Producer	Nat Geo	2012
Change Begins Within	Executive Producer	PBS	2012
Extreme Makeover: Home Edition	Executive Producer	ABC	2011
Extreme Makeover: Home Edition	Executive Producer	ABC	2010
Scrappers	Creator, Executive Producer	Spike	2010
Shafted (pilot)	Creator, Executive Producer	GSN	2009
Buzzin'	Creator, Executive Producer	MTV	2008
The Smart Show	Executive Producer	AOL/HBO	2007
Brother Baldwin (pilot)	Creator, Executive Producer	Vh1	2007
The Rock Life	Creator, Executive Producer	MTV	2007
Tim Stack's Family Vacation (Pilot)	Creator, Executive Producer	Nick at Nite	2006
Jamie Kennedy's Blowin' Up	Creator, Executive Producer	MTV	2004
Home James	Creator, Executive Producer	Vh1	2005
Most Likely To(pilot)	Creator, Executive Producer	Vh1	2004
The Women of K2	Executive Producer	National Geographic Channel	2003
Nashville Star	Creator, Executive Producer	USA Network	2003
Star Dates	Creator, Executive Producer	E!	2002
Murder in Small Town X	Creator, Executive Producer	Fox	2001
MTV's Fear	Director, executive producer	MTV	2000
MTV's Now What?	Episodic Director	MTV	2000
Son of the Beach	Episodic Director	FX	1999
Undressed	Episodic Director	MTV	1999
Austin Stories	Director, Co-Executive Producer	MTV	1997
A Tribute to Pedro Zamora	Creator, Executive Producer	MTV	1995
The Real World: London	Director, producer	MTV	1994
The Real World: San Francisco	Director, producer	MTV	1993
The Real World: Los Angeles	Director, producer	MTV	1992
The Real World: New York	Director, producer	MTV	1991
