= Scrapper =

Scrapper may refer to:

== Film and television ==
- The Scrapper, a 1917 short Western film directed by John Ford
- Scrappers, a 2010 feature documentary film
- Scrappers, a 2010 reality television show on Spike TV
- Scrapper (2011 film), a short film
- Scrapper (2013), an independent film starring Michael Beach, Anna Giles and Aidan Gillen
- Scrapper (2023 film), a British film

== Fictional characters ==
- Scrapper (Transformers), several Transformers characters
- Scrapper Griswell, a character in the comic strip Striker
- Scrapper, a cat in the animated TV series Mr. Bean
- Scrapper Smith, one of Lord Snooty's Pals in the Beano

== Other uses ==
- Someone who collects and sells scrap
- Someone who illegally collects and sells metal as scrap; see Metal theft
- A scrapbooker
- Scrapper Blackwell, 1903–1962, American blues guitarist and singer
- Scrappers, a role-playing game by Privateer Press
- Mahoning Valley Scrappers, a minor league baseball club based in Niles, Ohio, USA
- Nashville Scrappers, the sports team of Nashville High School in Nashville, Arkansas, US
