= Austin Stories =

- Created by: James Jones
- Starring: Laura House; Howard Kremer; Brad "Chip" Pope
- Country of origin: United States
- Original language: English
- No. of seasons: 1
- No. of episodes: 12

Production
- Executive producers: James Jones; Howard Kremer
- Camera setup: Single-camera
- Running time: 30 minutes

Original release
- Network: MTV
- Release: September 10, 1997 – January 7, 1998

Austin Stories is an American sitcom that aired on MTV from September 10, 1997 until January 7, 1998. It aired Wednesday nights at 10:30 pm. The show aired twelve episodes filmed on location in Austin, Texas.

An MTV search brought executives James Jones and Lisa Berger to Austin in 1994. Jones had previously produced The Ben Stiller Show and Berger was vice-president and director of development at the network. MTV scouts were drawn to the city's emerging comedy scene and noticed Laura House, Howard Kremer and Brad "Chip" Pope. They were all discovered at a showcase for MTV at the Laff Stop for professional comics. All three had to pull strings to get on the showcase as none of them had been paid for their comedy. House was a junior high journalism teacher when she was cast on the show. Both she and Brad "Chip" Pope were University of Texas graduates. Originally, the show was only guaranteed 13 episodes on the channel. In March 1997, MTV flew House, Kremer and Pope to Los Angeles to write two scripts in three days. Austin Stories was green-lighted on March 20, 1997, and they often spent 16-hour days working on the show with taping wrapping in November.

Their contract expired on May 8, 1998, and MTV extended it for three more weeks before permanently canceling the show on June 1, 1998.

== Cast ==
- Laura House as herself
- Howard Kremer as Howard
- Brad "Chip" Pope as himself
- Heather Kafka as Chloe
- Matt Bearden as Quinton

== Episodes ==
No.	Title	Directed by	Written by	Original release date
1	"Rambling Prague Vest"	George Verschoor	Unknown	September 10, 1997
2	"I Want Candy"	Danny Leiner	Unknown	September 17, 1997
3	"Suspicion"	Danny Leiner	Unknown	September 24, 1997
4	"Stalker of a Sales Band"	George Verschoor	Unknown	October 1, 1997
5	"Cults"	Danny Leiner	Unknown	October 8, 1997
6	"Party"	George Verschoor	Unknown	October 15, 1997
7	"Roots"	Arthur Borman	Unknown	October 22, 1997
8	"Road Trip"	Gary Auerbach	Unknown	November 5, 1997
9	"Chicks with Discs"	George Verschoor	Unknown	November 12, 1997
10	"Austin Sex Stories"	Danny Leiner	Unknown	November 19, 1997
11	"The Story of Cereal"	Danny Leiner	Unknown	November 26, 1997
12	"My Brother's Creeper"	James Jones	Unknown	January 7, 1998

== Response ==
USA Today gave the show three-and-a-half stars out of four and called it, "one of the season's coolest, funniest and most genuinely offbeat treats." In her review for The New York Times, Caryn James wrote, "With its meandering style, and its sense of wry comic absurdities rather than yuck-it-up one-liners, the series owes almost everything to Richard Linklater's Slacker (including their shared Austin setting). What it hasn't got from that film it owes to Jim Jarmusch's work, especially Stranger Than Paradise. But instead of seeming derivative, Austin Stories comes across as a first-rate sequel, proof that this laid-back sensibility can thrive on television as well as in films."

== See also ==
- Portlandia, a similar series set in Portland, Oregon
