= Darin Olien =

American author and podcast host (born 1970)

- Born: November 4, 1970 (age 55); Minnesota, United States
- Education: University of St. Thomas (BA); University of Santa Monica (MA, unaccredited)
- Television: Down to Earth with Zac Efron
- Spouse: Eliza Coupe (m. 2014; div. 2018)
- Website: darinolien.com

Darin Olien (born November 4, 1970) is an American author, TV and podcast host known for his advocacy of alternative medicine and whole food plant-based nutrition. He co-starred and produced the Netflix docuseries Down to Earth with Zac Efron in 2020. Olien describes himself as a "superfood hunter".

== Biography ==
Olien obtained a B.A. in exercise physiology from University of St. Thomas and an M.A. in psychology from University of Santa Monica in 2002. The University of Santa Monica is a private unaccredited graduate school.

In 2017, he authored SuperLife: The 5 Simple Fixes That Will Make You Healthy, Fit and Eternally Awesome. His 2023 book, Fatal Conveniences: The Toxic Products and Harmful Habits That Are Making You Sick—and the Simple Changes That Will Save Your Health offers advice on how to limit exposure to carcinogens, PFAS, and endocrine disruptors in everyday products. Olien has created many botanical supplements one of which was Shakeology for company BODi (formerly Beachbody) which is a nutrient dense shake sourced from botanicals all over the world. He also founded Barukas featuring a wild nut called Baru sourced from the Brazilian Cerrado. He advertises it as a "super nut".

In December 2014, actress Eliza Coupe and Olien were married in New Zealand. The couple divorced in 2018. He claims to have become interested in alternative medicine after a football injury in college. Olien is an advocate of whole food plant-based nutrition. He is the formulator of the plant-based, “Ultimate Reset” 21-day detoxification program. He is the host of the podcast, The Darin Olien Show. Darin is a 1993 graduate of Augsburg College (now University) in Minneapolis, Minnesota, and a 1989 graduate of Waseca High School, in Waseca, Minnesota, where he was raised.

== Down to Earth with Zac Efron ==
Olien starred in Down to Earth with Zac Efron a documentary television series that premiered on Netflix on July 10, 2020. The series has been criticized for promoting dubious health advice and pseudoscientific claims. Olien promotes the discredited alkaline diet of Robert O. Young.

== Selected publications ==
- SuperLife: The 5 Simple Fixes That Will Make You Healthy, Fit, and Eternally Awesome (2017)
- Fatal Conveniences: The Toxic Products and Harmful Habits That Are Making You Sick—and the Simple Changes That Will Save Your Health (2023)
