= Down to Earth with Zac Efron =

American web documentary series

- Genre: Documentary
- Starring: Zac Efron
- Narrated by: Zac Efron
- Country of origin: United States
- Original language: English
- No. of seasons: 2
- No. of episodes: 16

Production
- Executive producers: Zac Efron; Darin Olien; Jason Barrett; Griffin Gmelich; Cisco Henson; Michael Simpkin; Brian Volk-Weiss
- Producers: Dylan Efron; Laura Coconato; Steve Hoffman; Rachael Wax Taber
- Cinematography: Jeff Santos
- Editor: Rachel Wax Taber
- Production company: The Nacelle Company

Original release
- Network: Netflix
- Release: July 10, 2020 – November 11, 2022

Down to Earth with Zac Efron is an American documentary television series that premiered on Netflix on July 10, 2020. It stars Zac Efron and Darin Olien, who also act as executive producers of the series. The documentary revolves around Efron and his travels around the world to France, Puerto Rico, London, Iceland, Costa Rica, Peru, and Sardinia, and focuses on themes of travel, life experience, nature, green energy and sustainable living practices. Critics describe it as light in tone, but heavy in questionable health advice and pseudoscience.

A second season filmed solely around Australia aired on November 11, 2022. The series had its broadcast television premiere on The CW on July 18, 2023. However, it was pulled from the network's schedule after two episodes.

== Episodes ==
Season	Episodes	Originally released
1	8	July 10, 2020
2	8	November 11, 2022

=== Season 1 (2020) ===
No. overall	No. in season	Title	Original release date
1	1	"Iceland"	July 10, 2020
In between getting an up-close look at Iceland's renewable energy efforts, Zac soaks in a spa with Darin, samples reindeer and views natural wonders.
2	2	"France"	July 10, 2020
Before heading to Paris to learn about its tap water system, Zac joins pal Anna Kendrick for a lesson in H2O, courtesy of a water sommelier in LA.
3	3	"Costa Rica"	July 10, 2020
Zac and Darin try out life at a swanky eco-village committed to a small environmental footprint, visit a wildlife refuge and enjoy a zip lining trip.
4	4	"Sardinia"	July 10, 2020
On an Island that boasts a notable number of centenarians, Zac rethinks his view on nutrition as he ponders how the locals live such long, healthy lives.
5	5	"Lima"	July 10, 2020
Following a crash course in apple growing, Zac and Darin head to Peru to delve into potato cryopreservation, biopiracy and the sport of sandboarding.
6	6	"Puerto Rico"	July 10, 2020
In the devastating wake of Hurricane Maria, Zac explores sustainability in the region, where he meets San Juan mayor Carmen Yulín Cruz and, later, chef José Andrés, milks a goat, and eats ceviche.
7	7	"London"	July 10, 2020
After a beekeeping stop on a New York City rooftop, Zac checks out London's pollution-reduction efforts, from wall gardening to trash collecting by Thames21, as well as the city's ecotourism and Simon Rogan's Aulis restaurant.
8	8	"Iquitos"	July 10, 2020
Zac boosts his immune system in the Amazon rainforest before climbing a tree, exploring ayahuasca tourism and watching his dinner wriggle on a plate.

=== Season 2: Down Under (2022) ===
No. overall	No. in season	Title	Original release date
9	1	"Habitat Conservation"	November 11, 2022
From Sydney to the Greater Blue Mountains, Zac and Darin meet with leading eco-warriors to learn about protected lands and habitat conservation.
10	2	"Regenerative Agriculture"	November 11, 2022
Zac and Darin get down and dirty as they explore a natural approach to farming through regenerative agriculture and organic food production.
11	3	"Great Barrier Reef"	November 11, 2022
Along the coastline, Zac and Darin take a deep dive into the coral reef restoration techniques supporting a vast underwater ecosystem.
12	4	"Torres Strait"	November 11, 2022
Zac and Darin test their cooking skills in Melbourne before heading to the Torres Strait Islands to understand the impact of rising sea levels.
13	5	"Waste"	November 11, 2022
Searching for ways to minimize their carbon footprint, Zac and Darin visit a self-sustaining home and other businesses innovating to reduce waste.
14	6	"Wildfire"	November 11, 2022
In the aftermath of a devastating bushfire season, Zac and Darin learn about efforts to rehabilitate the wildlife and livestock population.
15	7	"Aboriginal Voices"	November 11, 2022
Leaders and representatives of Aboriginal communities show Zac and Darin how Indigenous cultures live to protect and preserve the land.
16	8	"Eco Innovators"	November 11, 2022
Eco-innovators introduce Zac and Darin to unique and cost-effective ways to address complex problems and help heal the environment.

== Reception ==
=== Critical response ===
For season 1, review aggregator Rotten Tomatoes reported an approval rating of 71% based on 14 reviews, with an average rating of 6.30/10 for the series. The website's critical consensus states, "Zac Efron's earnest exploration certainly comes off as Down to Earth, but the show's lack of focus undermines its important environmental message." Metacritic gave the series a weighted average score of 60 out of 100 based on 4 reviews, indicating "mixed or average reviews".

Ed Cumming of The Independent rated the show two stars out of five, saying "There must be a narrow band of people who care enough about Efron to tune in, but not enough about the environment to find this hopelessly simplistic." At Mashable, Alison Foreman was lukewarm, calling it "a fun enough, silly enough, educational enough trip worth taking if you love Zac or believe you have the capacity to love Zac. But you must love Zac to love Down to Earth."

Writing for the McGill Office for Science and Society, Jonathan Jarry argues the show is basically an advertisement for Darin Olien and the pseudoscientific products he espouses, from cancer-preventing superfoods to self-pasteurized raw goat milk. Jarry states that "the show consistently uses genuine ecological concerns to make us accept claims that do not hold water."

Quoting Jarry, as well as Joseph Schwarcz and Timothy Caulfield, Maggie Lange at Vice includes the show in a growing catalogue of Netflix programming promoting questionable health advice and pseudoscience. "What's most frustrating about this show is not its sprinkles of bunk; the most frustrating thing about this show is that it mixes bunk with earnest reporting."

In Insider, Lindsay Dodgson writes that "Olien acts as Efron's sidekick and health guru, but much of the supposed science he parrots throughout the series is unverified or disproven", then goes on to list eight health claims made in the series that are in fact wrong.

Emma Baty at Cosmopolitan and Daniel Fienberg at The Hollywood Reporter both focus on the superficiality of the information presented, with Efron and Olien barely taking the time to express enthusiasm about a topic ("Dude!") before moving on to something else.

Kayla Cobb of Decider was more positive, saying the series shows that "Efron was meant to be a travel host", and that he brings "energetic relatability in spades".

=== Accolades ===
Award	Year	Category	Nominee(s)	Result	Ref.
Daytime Emmy Awards	2021	Outstanding Travel, Adventure and Nature Program	Down to Earth with Zac Efron	Nominated	
Daytime Emmy Awards	2021	Outstanding Daytime Program Host	Zac Efron	Won	
Daytime Emmy Awards	2023	Outstanding Travel, Adventure and Nature Program	Jason Barrett, Zac Efron, Cisco Henson, Darin Olien, Michael Simkin, Brian Volk-Weiss, Steve Hoffmann, Tara Sarazen, Laura Coconato, Dylan Efron	Nominated	
Daytime Emmy Awards	2023	Outstanding Daytime Program Host	Zac Efron	Nominated	
Daytime Emmy Awards	2023	Outstanding Sound Mixing and Sound Editing	Joe Hernandez, Stacey Hempel, Lee Walker	Nominated	
Daytime Emmy Awards	2023	Outstanding Main Title and Graphic Design	Joshua Asen, Magui Garcia Solla, Declan Byrne, Sophie Smolders	Won	

== Lawsuit ==
A food company named Down to Earth Organics filed a lawsuit with the U.S. District Court for the Southern District of New York in July 2022, against Netflix, Darin Olien and Zac Efron. The company, which has no relationship with the television series, alleges its image is damaged by the association viewers might make with its products, given the series spreads misinformation about wellness. The company argues their allegations are supported by the article by the Office for Science and Society, where Jarry characterizes the show as "insidious nonsense". The company chose to act when a second season of the show was announced, stating it wanted to prevent further damage to its brand. As of July 2022, the allegations have not been proven in court.
