= Howard Kremer =

American rapper

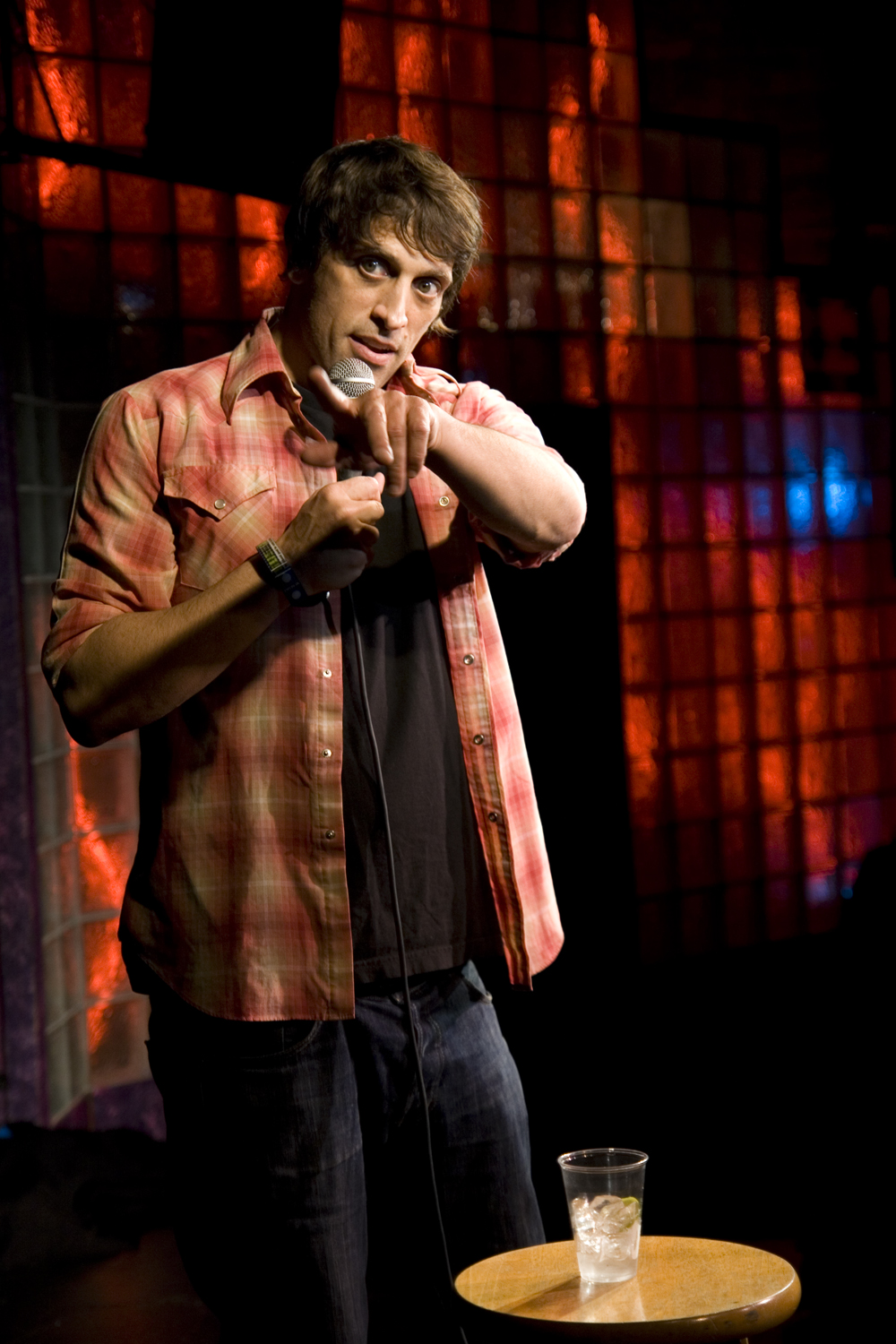
- Kremer at the 2010 South by Southwest festival

Background information
- Also known as: Dragon Boy Suede, Howie Michael Motorcycle, H. Michael Kre
- Born: Howard Michael Kremer; February 3, 1971 (age 55)
- Origin: Matawan, New Jersey, U.S.
- Genres: Comedy, hip hop
- Occupations: Rapper, comedian, actor
- Instrument: Vocals
- Website: http://www.haveasummah.com/

Howard Michael Kremer (born February 3, 1968), also known by his stage name Dragon Boy Suede and his nicknames H. Michael Kre and Howie Michael Motorcycle, is an American comedian and comedic rapper. Howard Kremer is the host of the Who Charted? podcast, available on the Earwolf podcasting empire and formerly co-hosted with Kulap Vilaysack. He also co-hosts the podcast Grifthorse with writer, comedian and actor Megan Koester.

== Personal life ==
Kremer was raised in Matawan, New Jersey. He has a twin sister, Nancy, as well as an older sister and an older brother, Leigh. Kremer often impersonates Leigh (Lee) in his comedy. After attending New York University, and Monmouth University (where he hosted a radio program), Kremer moved to Austin, TX where he pursued a career in stand-up comedy. With his writing partner, Brad "Chip" Pope, Kremer created the MTV single-camera comedy series Austin Stories. After the success of Austin Stories, Kremer moved to Los Angeles, CA to further his writing career.

== Career ==
Apart from a lead role on Austin Stories, and a half-hour special on Comedy Central Presents, Kremer's acting work includes recurring roles on Scare Tactics and the IFC series Comedy Bang! Bang!. Other television guest appearances include Adventure Time, Pretend Time, The Meltdown with Jonah and Kumail, @midnight, Brody Stevens: Enjoy It! and Jimmy Kimmel Live!.

He hosts the podcast Who Charted? on the Earwolf network.

He co-hosts the podcast Grifthorse with Megan Koester.

Kremer is a noted musician who contributes theme songs to the Who Charted? podcast and was featured in the song "Pi" by Hard 'n Phirm. With Dustin Marshall and Brett Morris as producers and contributors, Kremer has released four "Summah"-themed albums. As his alter ego, Dragon Boy Suede, Kremer has released three hip-hop albums.

== Discography ==
=== Stand Up ===
- The Attempt (2018)

=== Music ===
==== As Dragon Boy Suede ====
- Dragon Boy Suede (2006)
- Master of Pheromonies (2009)
- Douche Minutiae (2013)
- Tears on My Shaft (2016)

==== As Howard Kremer ====
- Have a Summah (2012)
- Have Anothah Summah (2013)
- Summah This Summah That (2014)
- Summahtology (2015)
- Oculus Summah (2016)
