= Heather Kafka =

American actress

- Born: July 7, 1972 (age 53); Austin, Texas, U.S.
- Education: The American Academy of Dramatic Arts
- Occupation: Actress
- Spouse: Darren Michael Lenton

Heather Kafka (born July 7, 1972, in Austin, Texas) is an American film, television, and voice actress who is known for playing Chloe in the television sitcom series Austin Stories, Lacy in the independent drama film Joe, and Henrietta Hewitt in the slasher film The Texas Chainsaw Massacre (2003). As a voice actress for ADV Films, her roles have included Hinagiku Tamano/Angel Daisy in the anime Wedding Peach and Jun Hunoo in the anime Mazinkaiser.

== Filmography ==
=== Live action ===
- About Mom and Dad... – Raye
- Ain't Them Bodies Saints – Midwife #1
- Angels Sing – David's Doctor
- Austin Stories – Chloe
- Beyond the Prairie: The True Story of Laura Ingalls Wilder Part 2 – Beth Maguson
- Black Metal (2013 short – Rose
- Blind (2004 short – Anne Campbell
- Bug (2017 film) – Emily
- CSI: Crime Scene Investigation – Mindy DuPont
- CSI: NY – Ophelia Dichara
- Daylight's End – Earnesta
- Drawback (2010 short) – Suze
- Don't Ever Change (2017 short) – Amy
- ER (TV series) – Rhonda
- Friday Night Lights – Doreen Sproles
- From Dusk till Dawn: The Series – Madame Diana
- Going to California (TV series) – Sandy
- House (TV series) – Sarah Kelvey
- Huff (TV series) – Dr. Emily Dawson
- Hysteria (TV series) – Val Young
- Idiocracy – Woman at Carl Jr's
- Jenny And Steph (short film) – Mom
- Joe (2013 film) – Lacy
- Kid-Thing – Mom
- Leftovers (2014 short film)- Her
- Longmire (TV series) – Holly Whitish
- Long Time Gone (2011 short film)- Lauren
- Love and Air Sex – Alamo Employee
- Lovers of Hate – Diana
- Loves Her Gun – Debbie
- Meet Jane – Lauren
- Movie Picture Makers – Girl
- Murder in the Heartland – Carol King
- Natural Selection (1999 film) – Cassandra
- Night Stalker (TV series) – Katrina Ortega
- Pit Stop (2013 film) – Linda
- Sacked (2012 short) – Jane
- Saturday Morning Mystery – Mona Kyser
- Skip Tracer – Attorney Michelle McGann
- Skunk (2014 short) – Leila's mom
- Slacker 2011 – Robber Gang Leader
- Some Beasts – Rene
- Song to Song – Suzie
- Strong Medicine – Callan Howe
- That Day – Mother
- The Last Note – Emily
- The Leftovers (TV series) – Susan
- The Man Who Never Cried – Mary Winston
- The People Next Door (1996 film) – Woman in Park
- The Samaritans – Lou-Anne
- The Secret She Carried – Cheryl
- The Texas Chainsaw Massacre (2003 film) – Henrietta Hewitt
- The Wendell Baker Story – Marianne
- Three Days of Rain – Lisa
- Where the Heart Is – Delphia
- Whiskey Fist – Karen
- Wind Session Tiger Woman – Mrs. Blake
- Wuss (2013 film) – State Board Lady
- Women in Law – Guest Star

=== Anime ===
- Devil Lady – Noriko
- King of Bandit Jing – Rose (ep.2)
- Mazinkaiser – Jun Hono
- Wedding Peach – Hinagiku Tamano/Angel Daisy, Freesia
- Wedding Peach DX – Hinagiku Tamano/Angel Daisy

=== Video games ===
- Deus Ex: Invisible War – Billie Adams
