= Ivan Kraljevic =

Montenegrin film director (born 1975)

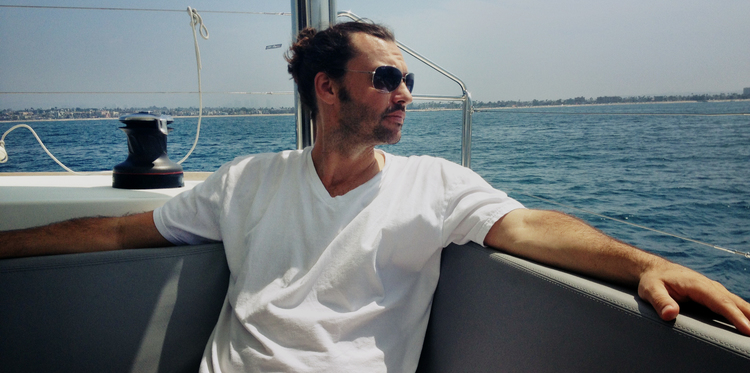
- Born: August 13, 1975 (age 51); Kotor, SR Montenegro, SFR Yugoslavia
- Occupation: Film director, TV & Film Producer

Ivan Kraljevic is a Montenegrin film director.

== Early life ==
Kraljevic was born in Kotor, Montenegro on August 13, 1975. He is the son of a Croatian sea captain and Montenegrin banker. Grandson of Vojin Božović one of the best football players in the history of Montenegro and one of the best forwards in Yugoslav football during the royal period. He was raised by his maternal great-grandmother, Stana, while both his parents worked. Kraljevic learned English and Italian by watching movies. In January 1992, at the age of sixteen, he moved to the United States as a high school exchange student.

== Career ==
Kraljevic joined the Directors Guild of America in 1999. He has worked on over one hundred projects in various capacities and directed his first feature film "The Harvesting" in 2015.

== Filmography ==
- Ivan Kraljevic at IMDb

== Awards ==
- A Thousand Tomorrows 2024 Movieguide Awards: Nominated: Epiphany Prize® for Most Inspiring TV or Streaming Movie or Program. Nominated: Best Television for Families;
- The Book of Queer (2023): Winner: 50th Daytime Creative Arts & Lifestyle Emmy Awards Outstanding Multiple Camera Editing. 50th Daytime Creative Arts & Lifestyle Emmy Awards Nominated

Outstanding Educational and Informational Program, Outstanding Casting, Outstanding Costume Design/Styling, Outstanding Multiple Camera Editing, Outstanding Main Title and Graphic Design, Outstanding Writing Team for a Daytime Non-Fiction Program

- Paper (2013): Won Best Drama - Short, Action on Film International Film Festival; Platinum Award for Independent Short Subject Film - Drama, Worldliest Houston; Juror's Choice Award for Best Social Commentary, Poppy Jasper film Festival; Short Film Award for Best Short Film, Moondance International Film Festival; Grand Jury Award for Best Romance Short, Bare Bones International Film Festival
- Shadows (2014): Nominated for Best Short Film and Best Cinematography, Action on Film International Film Festival
- The Harvesting (2015)
- Soul Harvest (2019)
