= Building Wild =

American television series

Building Wild is a reality construction series. It premiered on National Geographic Channel on January 14, 2014. The network's first-ever "do-it-yourself" series, Building Wild features the work of Paul DiMeo and Pat "Tuffy" Bakatis, collectively known as The Cabin Kings. Each week on the series, The Cabin Kings meet a new client who dreams of a backwoods getaway. In seven days or less, The Cabin Kings build their clients a custom cabin; the landowners must provide some materials and manpower in order to get the job done before the deadline. The cabins featured on the series each included an unexpected design element: a cabin that rotates 360 degrees, a cabin that floats, a cabin with a winch elevator (Tuffy-vator), or a bus converted into living space. Promoted by the network as "The most rugged construction series ever built," all episodes were filmed in the area surrounding Hoosick Falls, NY. The show was created by and is executive produced by George Verschoor and William Spjut.

Its second and final season premiered on February 24, 2015, and ended on April 21, 2015.

== Series format ==
Paul DiMeo (frequently referred to as "Paulie" on the series) spent nine seasons as a designer on ABC's Extreme Makeover: Home Edition. Partner Pat "Tuffy" Bakaitis is a master fabricator from rural New York. Together, they are The Cabin Kings, a construction "Odd Couple" that specializes in dream off-the-grid getaways. In each episode, The Cabin Kings meet a new client with a dream of a backwoods retreat. The Cabin Kings agree to provide a design and the know-how to get the cabin built in seven days or less. The clients must pitch in materials that can be repurposed as part of the build and manpower in the form of friends and relatives willing to lend a hand. Each episode becomes a race against the clock, as The Cabin Kings often must first build a road to access the remote building sites. Toward the end of each build, the landowner is sent away while the Cabin Kings make finishing touches on the cabin, so that each episode can culminate in a dramatic "reveal" with that week's clients seeing his or her newly built cabin for the first time.

=== Repurposing ===
Each client must contribute materials that can be recycled into the new cabin's design; this "repurposing" became a fan-favorite element of the series, and often provided dramatic or humorous reveals. A reclaimed tractor cab became an outhouse. An 800-gallon milk tank helped turn a dairy operation into a new microbrewery. A vintage camper is lifted into the trees to become a treetop guest house.

== Episodes ==
=== Season 1 ===
Episode	Title	Premiere date	Synopsis
101	Dirty Dozen Deer Lodge	Jan 14, 2014	The Cabin Kings have one week to help a hard-working farmer and his eleven best friends (who call themselves “The Dirty Dozen”) convert an old falling-down barn into a hunter's paradise.
102	Movable Beast	Jan 21, 2014	An ex-Navy SEAL and his best friend realize their dream of building a multi-purpose military-inspired camp on their vast 1200-acre property. The Cabin Kings convert a 1963 military cargo truck into a mobile wing of the cabin that can be driven anywhere on the property.
103	Spinning Cabin	Jan 28, 2014	The Cabin Kings plan to build a rustic Italian getaway for the Cangiano family, but when John Cangiano insists the cabin face the sunset, and his wife demands a view of the sunrise, Paul and Tuffy create a revolving cabin design set on an excavator base that can spin 360 degrees.
104	License To Mill	Feb 4, 2014	A retired equine veterinarian realizes his lifelong dream of having an isolated cabin on his vast property, built entirely from materials found on his land.
105	Log Jam	Feb 11, 2014	The Cabin Kings crank up dueling chainsaws and reinvent the term “log cabin” when they build a woodpile-inspired getaway for a father and son logging team using materials from dad's junkyard.
106	Backwoods Bus	Feb 18, 2014	The Cabin Kings help a small-town schoolteacher build the off-the-grid log cabin of his dreams, converting an old school bus into a sleeping porch.
107	Tuff Enuff	Feb 25, 2014	The Cabin Kings transform an everyday shipping container into a wilderness cabin with a lookout tower and a winch elevator.
108	Double Decker Cabin	Mar 4, 2014	The Cabin Kings must conquer a water-logged build site to build a double-decker cabin for a "redneck podiatrist" and his lifelong best friend.
109	Float My Cabin	Mar 11, 2014	A bird-loving biologist gets a cabin in the swamp with its own floating duck blind and a human-sized bird nest on the roof.
110	Top Of The World	Mar 18, 2014	The Cabin Kings build a one-of-a-kind snowboard cabin with its own snowboarding ramp on top of an abandoned ski resort.

=== Season 2 ===
Episode	Title	Premiere date	Synopsis
201	Tailgating Paradise	Feb 24, 2015	The Cabin Kings tackle their biggest-ever cabin build for a football-crazy client: A 1350 sq ft mountaintop tailgating paradise for a lifelong NY Jets fan.
202	Waterfall Cabin	Mar 3, 2015	A two-mile treacherous mountain road separates a young married couple from the cabin site of their dreams: a mountaintop with a million-dollar view of the Hudson River Valley. To conquer this project, the Cabin Kings will have to haul their supplies straight uphill, build a bridge over a waterfall and build an unforgettable cabin for the Meracle family.
203	Floating Getaway	Mar 10, 2015	Father and son fishing fanatics demand a cabin that can sail out onto their family pond and be used as a fisherman's headquarters year-round.
204	Marble Getaway	Mar 17, 2015	It's the Cabin Kings’ heaviest build ever! Tuffy and Paulie must build a cabin deep in an abandoned marble quarry, using the enormous marble slabs that have been resting there for a century.
205	Hilltop Hangar	Mar 24, 2015	A professional pilot wants to achieve his boyhood dream by building an aviation-themed cabin, complete with control tower.
206	Treehouse Cabin	Mar 31, 2015	The Cabin Kings race against the clock to deliver the ultimate treehouse cabin to their recently engaged client in time for his upcoming bachelor party.
207	Maple Syrup Motor Club	Apr 7, 2015	The Hynick family loves making their own maple syrup and hitting the highway on their Harleys. The Cabin Kings are combine those two loves in a cabin that doubles as a biker hangout and a syrup-making "sugar shack."
208	Brewhouse Cabin	Apr 14, 2015	A dairy farmer and his microbrewing son want the Cabin Kings to build them a backwoods brewery using repurposed items like an 800-gallon milk tank, a dilapidated corn crib, a broken-down table saw, and some repurposed skylights.
209	Collector's Cabin	Apr 21, 2015	The Cabin Kings build father/son auctioneers Kyle and Ron Seifert the Collector's Cabin of their dreams, featuring selections from 50 years’ worth of the family's collecting: a 1956 classic car, vintage memorabilia, building materials and even an old gas pump.
210	Demolition Derby Cabin	Apr 21, 2015	A dad with a "need for speed" gets his dream of a car-inspired cabin that comes complete with a convertible second story with a retractible roof so he can sleep under the stars.
