= Island of the Sea Wolves =

- Promotional poster
- Genre: Nature documentary
- Written by: David Fowler; James Honeyborne; Jeff Turner
- Directed by: Chelsea Turner; Jeff Turner; Louise Ferguson; Alex Burr
- Narrated by: Will Arnett
- Composers: Laurentia Editha; Denise Santos
- Country of origin: Canada
- Original language: English
- No. of episodes: 3

Production
- Producer: Armen Evrensel
- Cinematography: Maxwel Hohn
- Production company: Netflix

Original release
- Release: 11 October 2022

Island of the Sea Wolves is a 2022 Canadian documentary series nominated for 7 Emmys, and narrated by Will Arnett. Filmed on Vancouver Island, the series focuses on sea wolves and bald eagles, animal species that must forage for food in the cold waters of the Pacific Ocean. The series premiered on the Netflix streaming platform on October 11, 2022.

== Episodes ==
No.	Title	Narrated by	Original release date
1	"Spring"	Will Arnett	11 October 2022
Cedar, a pregnant sea wolf, must struggle to find her food after being left behind by her pack. Meanwhile, the other creatures of Vancouver Island face the spring trying to secure a food source for the youngest members of the family.
2	"Summer"	Will Arnett	11 October 2022
As summer arrives, the resources obtained become scarce, and a difficult season begins for all the animals on the island. When Cedar meets the alpha female, something extraordinary happens.
3	"Fall"	Will Arnett	11 October 2022
Wolf pup Blaze is accidentally left behind by the pack, and must face the hardships of autumn on his own. The season proves far from easy for all the animals on the island.

== Reception ==
The documentary was well received by critics. Joel Keller of Decider said that the series "does what a lot of nature docuseries should do, which is focus on one geographical area and follow its inhabitants through the different seasons. It makes for a fascinating show".

Greg Wheeler of The Review Geek wrote: "Island of the Sea Wolves is an informative, well-written and enjoyable nature docu-series. Sure, it’s no David Attenborough epic but while Frozen Planet II awes and inspires on BBC, Netflix’s effort isn’t bad either". Jordan Russell Lyon of the site Ready Steady Cut called it a good offering for fans of nature shows.

=== Accolades ===
Year	Award	Category	Nominee(s)	Result	Ref.
2023	Daytime Creative Arts & Lifestyle Emmy Awards	Outstanding Travel, Adventure and Nature Program	James Honeyborne, Tim Martin, Jeff Turner, Lynn Fuhr, Lotta Hellzen	Nominated	
2023	Daytime Creative Arts & Lifestyle Emmy Awards	Outstanding Cinematography	Russell Clark, Samuel Ellis, James Frystak, Maxwel Hohn, Matthew Hood, Kieran O'Donovan, Dave Pearson, Adam Ravetech, Robin Smith and Darren West	Won	
2023	Daytime Creative Arts & Lifestyle Emmy Awards	Outstanding Directing Team for a Single Camera Daytime Non-Fiction Program	Jeff Turner, Chelsea Turner, Alex Burr, Louise Ferguson	Nominated	
2023	Daytime Creative Arts & Lifestyle Emmy Awards	Outstanding Single Camera Editing	Erin Cumming, Jacob Parish, Steve Phillips, Jeanne Slater	Won	
2023	Daytime Creative Arts & Lifestyle Emmy Awards	Outstanding Music Direction and Composition	Laurentia Editha, Denise Santos	Nominated	
2023	Daytime Creative Arts & Lifestyle Emmy Awards	Outstanding Sound Mixing and Sound Editing	Jonny Crew, Kate Hopkins, Ben Peace, Hannah Gregory, Tyson Lozensky, Nicholas Allan, Tom Mercer, Luke O’Connell, Owen Peter, Harsha Thangirala, Paul Ackerman, Rory Joseph and Ellie Bowler	Won	
2023	Daytime Creative Arts & Lifestyle Emmy Awards	Outstanding Writing Team for a Daytime Non-Fiction Program	David Fowler, James Honeyborne and Jeff Turner	Won	
