= Paul DiMeo =

American interior designer (born 1958)

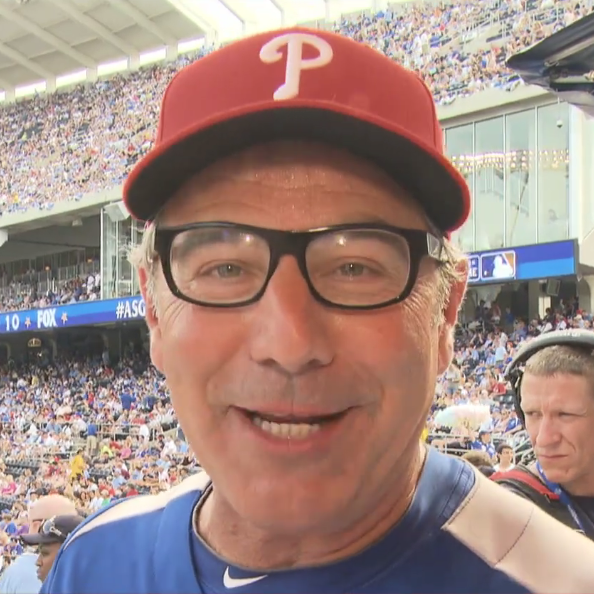
- DiMeo at the All-Star Legends & Celebrity Softball Game in 2012
- Born: February 12, 1958 (age 67); Media, Pennsylvania, U.S.
- Occupation: Actor/producer/Carpenter/Reality-Show star
- Years active: 1977–present
- Notable work: Extreme Makeover: Home Edition
- Spouse: Kelly Lynn Canterbury (m. 1992)

Paul DiMeo (born February 12, 1958) is an American television personality, philanthropist, building designer, and carpenter who was a regular cast member of the reality television series Extreme Makeover: Home Edition.

== Early life and education ==
Paul DiMeo was born and raised in Media, Pennsylvania. He is the youngest of five children, and at 5 years old his house burned down. His father Jack worked to reconstruct it, sparking his love of home renovations.

DiMeo graduated from Penncrest High School, class of 1976, where he was quite active in student activities such as play production and the student council.

== Career ==
DiMeo was the organizer of a renovating project entitled "Loft Living." The organization renovated lofts and brownstones in and around New York City. DiMeo later moved to Los Angeles, California where he continued the "Loft Living" project.

In 2003, DiMeo was cast in Extreme Makeover: Home Edition (138 episodes/2003–2012). According to DiMeo, he landed the job because the casting department was amused by his "grumpy" demeanor on the day of his audition.

In the first season, Extreme Makeover: Home Edition garnered an Emmy nomination for Outstanding Reality Program.

At the show’s peak, it was spoofed on Saturday Night Live on Dec. 14, 2019 on NBC. DiMeo was highlighted due to his propensity to cry frequently during many episodes of Extreme Makeover.

DiMeo worked with master carpenter Rob Hickman on the restoration of the Landmark Brownstone of Aaron Burr.

Has renovated celebrity homes, including those of Madonna, George Hamilton and Glenn Close.

In 2011, he was asked by Major League Baseball to design the MLB Fan Cave, where Mike O'Hara and Ryan Wagner watched every baseball game of the 2011 season. He hosts an infomercial for the WORX Trivac.

DiMeo starred in the reality TV show Building Wild, which was cancelled by the National Geographic Channel after two seasons.

== Personal life ==
DiMeo lives in Los Angeles with his wife, Kelly Lynn.
