= The Estate (2020 film) =

- Film poster
- Directed by: James Kapner
- Written by: Chris Baker
- Starring: Eliza Coupe; Greg Finley; Chris Baker; Heather Matarazzo; Eric Roberts
- Distributed by: Vertical Entertainment
- Release date: October 2020 (Newport Beach)
- Country: United States
- Language: English

The Estate is a 2020 American comedy thriller film directed by James Kapner and starring Eliza Coupe, Greg Finley, Chris Baker, Heather Matarazzo and Eric Roberts. It is Kapner's feature directorial debut.

== Plot ==
When the spoiled son and newest wife of a billionaire patriarch plot to murder him, they form a psycho-sexual bond with their brutally handsome hitman as they kill and kill (and kill) in their quest for wealth and recognition.

== Cast ==
- Chris Baker as George
- Eliza Coupe as Lux
- Greg Finley as Joe
- Eric Roberts as Marcello
- Lala Kent as Caitlin
- Rocío de la Grana as Rose
- Alexandra Paul as Bethenny
- Heather Matarazzo as Mary
- Aubyn Philabaum as Tawny Taubin
- Ezra Buzzington as Mr. Amis
- Kyle Rezzarday as Pool Boy
- Allan Graf as Driver
- Trent Eisfeller as Valet
- Cohen Prescott as Boardroom Lawyer

== Release ==
The film premiered at the Newport Beach Film Festival in October 2020.

== Reception ==
The Estate received mostly negative reviews from critics, holding a 27% rating on Rotten Tomatoes. It holds a 4.7 out of 10 on IMDb, with 364 ratings.

John Serba of Decider describer the film as "shallow, tonally uneven and only infrequently funny". Rating the film a 3/10, Alex McPherson of Cultured Vultures wrote that "The Estate is a cynical exercise in immaturity over substance". More positively, Rob Rector of Film Threat gave the film a 9 out of 10.
