= Megan Koester =

American comedian

Megan Beth Koester is an American comedian, writer, journalist and actress who regularly performs stand-up comedy in Los Angeles, CA. From 2013 to 2018, she was a contributor to Vice Magazine, writing about media, comedy, the entertainment industry, feminism and Los Angeles culture. She writes on similar subjects for Jezebel, Thrillist and The Guardian.

Megan Koester co-authored The Indignities of Being a Woman with Merrill Markoe in 2018, an audio work published by Audible which combines historic research with humor. The album discusses the experience of womanhood throughout time from the perspective of two women working in comedy.

In January 2019, her comedy album Tertium Non Datur, created from a live taping hosted by Andy Kindler in May 2018, was released by Aspecialthing Records.

Koester played the character of Madeline Cross in "The Pain of Being Alive," episode 3 of season 1 of Comedy Central's Corporate, a TV show that makes fun of the employee experience in a large corporation. L.A. Weekly named her comedy act "one to watch" in 2015.

Along with co-hosts Emily Whittemore, and Alison Stevenson (Mary Kobayashi left early on), Koester was also featured on the Adult Swim streaming network's The Perfect Women. On July 23, 2019, Koester began the weekly podcast Grifthorse with comedian Howard Kremer.
