= Pivoting (TV series) =

2022 American sitcom television series

- Genre: Sitcom
- Created by: Liz Astrof
- Starring: Eliza Coupe; Ginnifer Goodwin; Maggie Q; Tommy Dewey; JT Neal; Marcello Reyes
- Music by: Gabriel Mann
- Country of origin: United States
- Original language: English
- No. of seasons: 1
- No. of episodes: 10

Production
- Executive producers: Dana Honor; Tristram Shapeero; Aaron Kaplan; Liz Astrof
- Producers: Meg Schave; Aminta Goyel; Jessica Poter; Desirée J. Cadena
- Cinematography: Amy Vincent; Grant Smith
- Editors: Dean Pollack; Hallie Faben Comfort
- Camera setup: Single-camera
- Running time: 22–23 minutes
- Production companies: Mama Look! Productions; Kapital Entertainment; Fox Entertainment; Warner Bros. Television

Original release
- Network: Fox
- Release: January 9 – March 10, 2022

Pivoting is an American sitcom television series created by Liz Astrof that premiered on Fox on January 9, 2022, and ended on March 10, 2022. In May 2022, the series was canceled after one season.

== Premise ==
After the sudden death of their friend Coleen, three middle-aged friends, Amy, Jodie and Sarah, decide that life is short and they must "pivot" their lives in new directions. As they each make impulsive choices in an attempt to find happiness, it strengthens their friendship.

== Cast and characters ==
=== Main ===
- Eliza Coupe as Amy, a local morning talk show producer and workaholic who commits to spending more time with her children despite her fear of familial responsibility
- Ginnifer Goodwin as Jodie, a mother of three children who develops a crush on her trainer while trying to achieve a lifelong fitness goal
- Maggie Q as Sarah, a surgeon who gives up her stressful career to become a cashier at a grocery store and recently divorced her wife
- Tommy Dewey as Henry, Amy's husband
- JT Neal as Matt, Jodie's trainer
- Marcello Reyes as Luke, Amy's 7-year old son

=== Recurring ===
- Robert Baker as Dan, Jodie’s husband
- Colton Dunn as Brian, Coleen's husband who is now a widower
- Audrey Gerthoffer as Andrea, Jodie’s teenage daughter who runs a social media beauty channel
- Connie Jackson as Gloria, Amy’s nanny

== Episodes ==
No.	Title	Directed by	Written by	Original release date	Prod. code	U.S. viewers (millions)
1	"If She Could See Us Now"	Tristram Shapeero	Liz Astrof	January 9, 2022	T11.10138	2.43
2	"My Friend Died!"	Daniella Eisman	Niki Schwartz-Wright	January 13, 2022	T12.17103	1.02
3	"The Giving Tree"	Tristram Shapeero	Liz Astrof	January 20, 2022	T12.17102	1.13
4	"Hell on Wheels"	Tristram Shapeero	David Booth	January 27, 2022	T12.17104	0.95
5	"D-Day"	Daniella Eisman	Linda Videtti Figueiredo	February 3, 2022	T12.17105	1.21
6	"The Three Bleepin' Bleeps"	Tristram Shapeero	Jessica Poter	February 10, 2022	T12.17106	1.07
7	"Bounce, Baby"	Anna Dokoza	Aminta Goyel	February 17, 2022	T12.17107	1.05
8	"Doompa-Dee Doo"	Anna Dokoza	King Hassan	February 24, 2022	T12.17108	0.81
9	"Fans Only"	Catriona McKenzie	Niki Schwartz-Wright & Linda Videtti Figueiredo	March 3, 2022	T12.17109	0.74
10	"Coleen in a Box"	Tristram Shapeero	Liz Astrof	March 10, 2022	T12.17110	0.96

== Production ==
=== Development ===
On November 15, 2019, it was announced that the series was in development at Fox under the title Pivoting, from creator Liz Astrof. Aaron Kaplan and Dana Honor would serve as executive producers. On February 6, 2020, Pivoting was given a pilot order by Fox. The pilot is written by Liz Astrof and directed by Tristram Shapeero. On May 10, 2021, Pivoting was picked to series by Fox. The series is created by Astrof who is expected to executive produce alongside Shapeero, Aaron Kaplan, and Dana Honor. Production companies involved with the series are Kapital Entertainment, Warner Bros. Television, and Fox Entertainment. The series premiered on January 9, 2022. On May 13, 2022, Fox canceled the series after one season.

=== Casting ===
On April 21, 2020, Eliza Coupe and Tommy Dewey were cast to star. On May 20, 2020, Ginnifer Goodwin joined the main cast. On September 17, 2020, JT Neal was cast as a series regular. On December 8, 2020, Maggie Q joined the cast in a starring role. When Pivoting was picked to series, Marcello Reyes was also listed as a main cast member.

== Reception ==
=== Critical response ===
The review aggregator website Rotten Tomatoes reported a 100% approval rating with an average rating of 7/10, based on 10 critic reviews. Metacritic, which uses a weighted average, assigned a score of 67 out of 100 based on 10 critics, indicating "generally favorable reviews".

=== Ratings ===
Viewership and ratings per episode of Pivoting
No.	Title	Air date	Rating (18–49)	Viewers (millions)	DVR (18–49)	DVR viewers (millions)	Total (18–49)	Total viewers (millions)
1	"If She Could See Us Now"	January 9, 2022	0.6	2.43	TBD	TBD	TBD	TBD
2	"My Friend Died!"	January 13, 2022	0.2	1.02	TBD	TBD	TBD	TBD
3	"The Giving Tree"	January 20, 2022	0.3	1.31	TBD	TBD	TBD	TBD
4	"Hell on Wheels"	January 27, 2022	0.2	0.95	TBD	TBD	TBD	TBD
5	"D-Day"	February 3, 2022	0.2	1.21	TBD	TBD	TBD	TBD
6	"The Three Bleepin' Bleeps"	February 10, 2022	0.2	1.07	TBD	TBD	TBD	TBD
7	"Bounce, Baby"	February 17, 2022	0.2	1.05	TBD	TBD	TBD	TBD
8	"Doompa-Dee Doo"	February 24, 2022	0.2	0.81	TBD	TBD	TBD	TBD
9	"Fans Only"	March 3, 2022	0.2	0.74	TBD	TBD	TBD	TBD
10	"Coleen in a Box"	March 10, 2022	0.2	0.96	TBD	TBD	TBD	TBD
