= Eliza Coupe =

American actress, comedian, and model

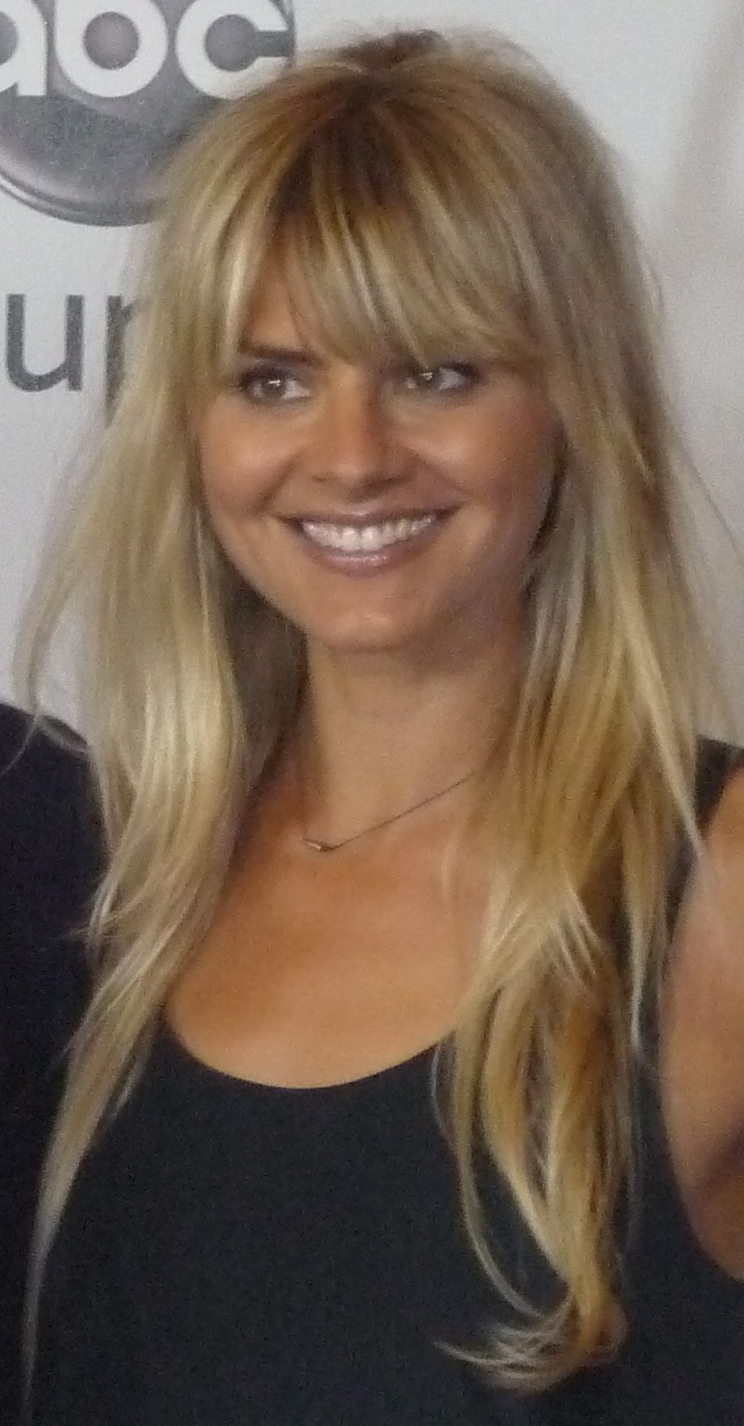
- Coupe at ABC's 2010 Summer Press Tour
- Born: Plymouth, New Hampshire, U.S.
- Education: California Institute of the Arts (BFA)
- Occupations: Actress; comedian; model
- Years active: 2006–present
- Spouses: Randall Whittinghill (m. 2007; div. 2013) Darin Olien (m. 2014; div. 2018) Billy Marks (m. 2023)

Eliza Coupe (/ˈkuːp/) is an American actress, comedian and model, known for playing Jane Kerkovich-Williams in the ABC comedy series Happy Endings, Denise "Jo" Mahoney in the eighth and ninth seasons of the medical comedy-drama Scrubs, her starring role as Tiger on the Hulu comedy series Future Man, and her recurring role as Hannah Wyland in Quantico. She starred in the Fox comedy Pivoting in 2022. Most recently, she had supporting roles in the Netflix series Murderville, the CBS legal drama So Help Me Todd and the Fox medical comedy Best Medicine.

== Early life ==
Coupe was born and raised in Plymouth, New Hampshire, to Ernest and Kathryn Coupe. She has two brothers, Sam and Thom. She attended Plymouth Regional High School in her hometown and graduated in 1999. She is of French, English and Scottish heritage.

Coupe was active in her high school's theatre program. Her roles included Bonnie in Anything Goes and a Mundy sister in Dancing at Lughnasa. She graduated from California Institute of the Arts (CalArts) in 2006.

== Career ==
After college, Coupe took classes in improvisational comedy at The Groundlings and ImprovOlympic. In 2003, she toured France playing a soldier in an all-female version of King Lear. In November 2005, her one-woman sketch show The Patriots premiered at the Upright Citizens Brigade Theatre in New York and won her the Breakout Performer Award at HBO's U.S. Comedy Arts Festival in Aspen, Colorado in March 2006.

In 2007, she appeared in I Think I Love My Wife. She appeared in the short-lived MTV series Short Circuitz. She was in "Girlfriends", episode 8 of the first season of Flight of the Conchords; and in an episode of Unhitched. She was a series regular in HBO's unaired 12 Miles of Bad Road and had a recurring role in Samantha Who?

She had a recurring role as Dr. Denise "Jo" Mahoney in Season 8 of the TV series Scrubs and the companion web series Scrubs: Interns. She was made a regular in Season 9, the final season of the series before it continued nearly sixteen years later.

In March 2009, Coupe was cast as Callie in the ABC pilot No Heroics, an adaptation of the UK series of the same name. In 2012, she played the female lead and love interest to Daniel Henney in the independent film Shanghai Calling, filmed in Shanghai, China. She also appeared in the 2011 movie What's Your Number? with Anna Faris and Chris Evans.

From April 2011 to May 2013, Coupe starred on the ABC ensemble comedy series Happy Endings alongside Elisha Cuthbert, Zachary Knighton, Adam Pally, Damon Wayans, Jr. and Casey Wilson. Despite critical acclaim and a cult following, the show was cancelled by ABC after concluding its third season on May 3, 2013. Since Happy Endings's cancellation, She played a recurring role in the third season of House of Lies and starred alongside Jay Harrington in the USA Network comedy series Benched, which premiered on October 28, 2014. She later starred in the ABC thriller Quantico playing the recurring role of FBI agent Hannah Wyland.

Coupe also starred as Tiger on the Hulu comedy series Future Man, which premiered November 14, 2017. The third and final season aired in 2020.

In April 2020, she was cast as Amy in the Fox comedy series Pivoting. It debuted on January 9, 2022 with positive reviews, but the show was cancelled after one season.

== Personal life ==
Coupe has been vegetarian and a PETA supporter since she was nine years old, and admits to struggling with body image.

Coupe was married to acting teacher Randall Whittinghill from December 2007 to June 2013.

She announced her engagement to Darin Olien, founder of lifestyle brand SuperLife, via Instagram on November 27, 2014. They were married on December 24, 2014 while on vacation in New Zealand. They filed for divorce in 2018.

Coupe married her current husband Billy Marks, a professional skateboarder, in 2023.

== Filmography ==
=== Film ===
Year	Title	Role	Notes
2006	The Day the World Saved Shane Sawyer	Allison	Short film
2007	I Think I Love My Wife	Lisa	
2010	Somewhere	Hotel Room Neighbor	
2011	What's Your Number?	Sheila	
2012	Shanghai Calling	Amanda	
2013	Anchorman 2: The Legend Continues	Sea World Trainer	
2014	The Last Time You Had Fun	Ida	
2015	It's Us	Joe	
2017	The 4th	Stacy	
2017	Naked	Vicky	
2018	Making Babies	Karen Kelley	
2020	The Estate	Lux	

=== Television ===
Year	Title	Role	Notes
2007	Nick Cannon Presents: Short Circuitz	Various	Episode #1.3
2007	Flight of the Conchords	Lisa	Episode: "Girlfriends"
2008	Unhitched	Julia	Episode: "Pilot"
2008	12 Miles of Bad Road	Gaylor Shakespeare	6 episodes
2008	Samantha Who?	Willow	2 episodes
2009	Royal Pains	Katie	Episode: "Crazy Love"
2009–2010	Scrubs	Denise Mahoney	Recurring role (Season 8); Main role (Season 9); 24 episodes
2011	Community	Special Agent Robin Vohlers	Episode: "Intro to Political Science"
2011–2013	Happy Endings	Jane Kerkovich-Williams	Main role; 57 episodes
2012	Happy Endings: Happy Rides	Jane Kerkovich-Williams	Web series
2013	The Millers	Janice	2 episodes
2014	House of Lies	Marisa McClintock	4 episodes
2014	Benched	Nina Whitley	Lead role; 12 episodes
2015	Casual	Emmy	5 episodes
2015	Superstore	Cynthia	1 episode
2015–2016	The Mindy Project	Chelsea	4 episodes
2015–2018	Quantico	Hannah Wyland	Recurring role
2016	Wrecked	Rosa	2 episodes
2017–2020	Future Man	Tiger	Main role
2018	Rob Riggle's Ski Master Academy	Preggers	Main role
2018	Angie Tribeca	Dr. Autumn Portugal	Episode: "The Force Wakes Up"
2019	Veronica Mars	Karsyn	Episode: "Spring Break Forever"
2019	Stumptown	Guest Star	Episode: "November Surprises"
2019	Sherman's Showcase	Guest Star	Episode: "White Music"
2021	DuckTales	Molly Cunningham (voice)	Episode: "The Lost Cargo of Kit Cloudkicker"
2022	Pivoting	Amy	Main role
2022	Reboot	Nora	Guest role
2023	So Help Me Todd	Veronica Caron	Guest role
2025	High Potential	Carina Wilson	Episode: “Chutes and Murders”
2025	The Residence	Margery Bay Bix	Recurring role
2025	The Hunting Party	Jenna Wells	Guest role
2025	Rick and Morty	Cogs (voice)	Episode: "Morty Daddy"
2025	Haunted Hotel	Katherine (voice)	Main role
2025	Solar Opposites	Nomi (voice)	Episode: "The Last Flight of Ariana 1"
2026–present	Best Medicine	Dr. Eden Montgomery	Recurring role
