= All-Star Legends & Celebrity Softball Game =

Annual softball game

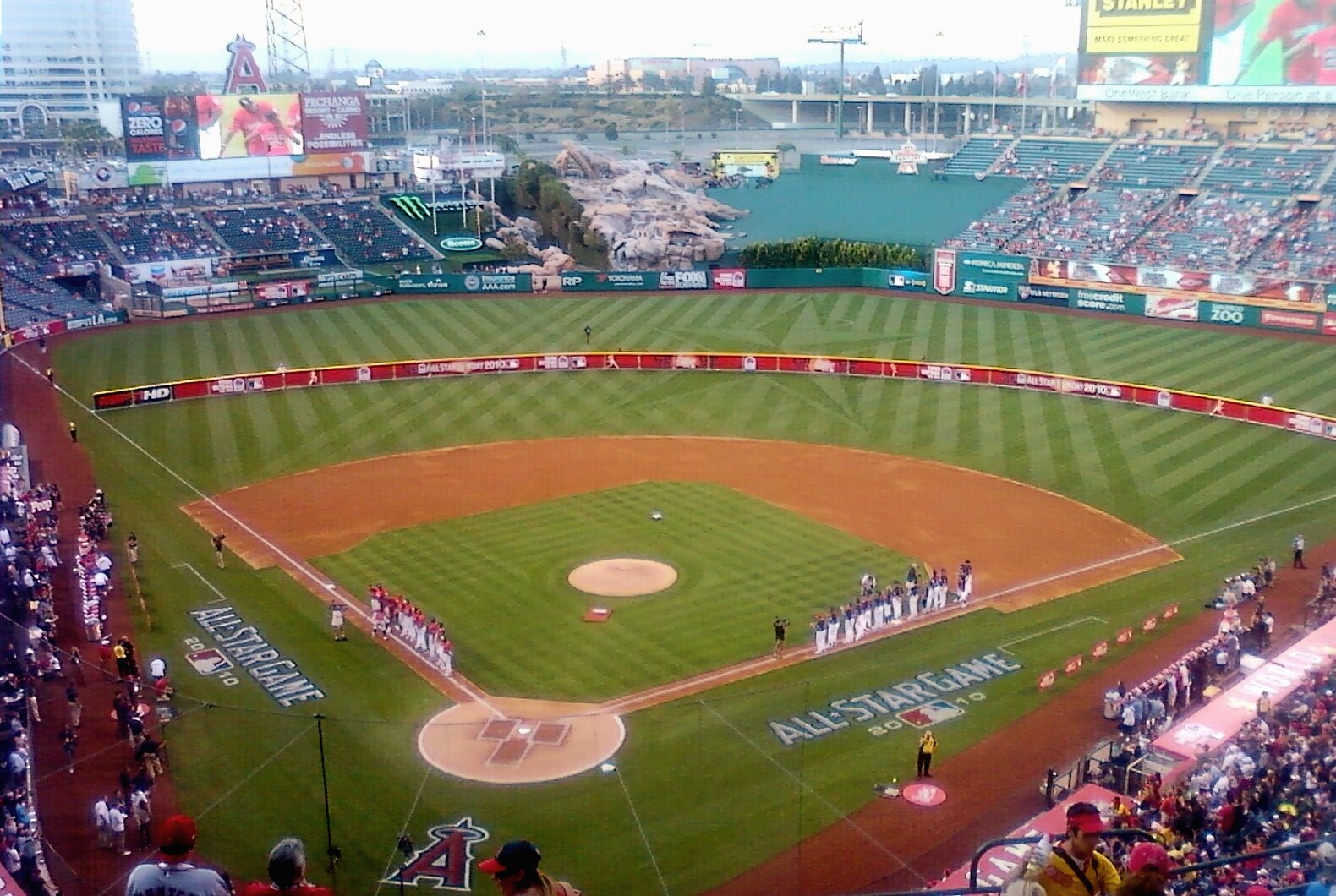
The 2010 Taco Bell All-Star Legends and Celebrity Softball Game at Angel Stadium of Anaheim

The GEICO® All-Star Legends and Celebrity Softball Game was an annual game that brings former Major League Baseball all-stars and celebrities together in a friendly exhibition. The game is played the day before the Home Run Derby. It had been sponsored by MGM Resorts, RadioShack, Taco Bell & Corona; in 2025, GEICO sponsored.

The game started in 2001 in Seattle and was played at the site of that year's All-Star Game and lasted until 2025. It was broadcast on tape delay on MLB Network.

== Rules ==
From 2001 to 2006, the game used standard softball rules with a temporary wall [250 ft (76.2 m) from home plate] on the field. In 2007 & since 2022, the rules were changed. Instead of 7 innings, there are only 5 innings with everyone on the team batting, whether or not they are in the field. From 2008 to 2012, it is unknown how long the game lasted. From 2013 to 2019 & 2021, six innings were played. A 2022 rule change saw a 10-batter limit or three outs, whichever comes first, to conclude innings (which won't apply to final inning of regulation, if trailing team is behind). In place of extra innings, a swing-off was introduced. If the teams were tied at the end of 5 innings, managers from each team would pick three batters, who'll get one swing each. Whoever hits the most home runs in the 3 rounds will win and get credited one run & hit each; otherwise, teams play sudden-death rounds until one team hits a home run.

== Game summaries ==
=== 2001 ===
The 2001 RadioShack Legends and Celebrity Softball Game was played on Sunday, July 8, 2001, at Safeco Field in Seattle, Washington. ESPN broadcast the game after the Home Run Derby. For this game the teams are named after specialty coffee drinks as a nod to the coffee industry in Seattle.

==== Lineups ====
Espressos		Lattes	
Player	Legend/Celebrity	Player	Legend/Celebrity
Kenny Mayne	Celebrity (Manager)	Harold Reynolds	Legend (Manager)
Fred Lynn	Legend	Alvin Davis	Legend
Freddie Prinze, Jr.	Celebrity	Chi McBride	Celebrity
Henry Simmons	Celebrity	Dale Earnhardt Jr.	Celebrity
Howie Long	Celebrity	Frederick Thomas	Celebrity
Jeff Ament	Celebrity	James Van Der Beek	Celebrity
Jessica Biel	Celebrity	Jim Caviezel	Celebrity
Jonathan Lipnicki	Celebrity	Jimmy Perez	Celebrity
Joy Enriquez	Celebrity	Michael Badalucco	Celebrity
Keith Hernandez	Legend	Paul Williams	Celebrity
Lisa Fernandez	Celebrity	Goose Gossage	Legend
Marc Blucas	Celebrity	Robert Wuhl	Celebrity
Matthew Lillard	Celebrity	Scott Patterson	Celebrity
Meat Loaf	Celebrity	Steve Garvey	Legend
Ozzie Smith	Legend	Thomas Jane	Celebrity
Rick Fox	Celebrity	Tina Wesson	Celebrity
Tug McGraw	Legend	Tony Todd	Celebrity
Vanessa L. Williams	Celebrity	Vitamin C	Celebrity
Wilmer Valderrama	Celebrity	Don Mattingly	Legend

=== 2002 ===
The 2002 Radioshack Legends and Celebrity Softball Game was played on Sunday, July 7, 2002, at Miller Park in Milwaukee, Wisconsin. ESPN broadcast the game after the Home Run Derby with commentators Dave O'Brien and Rick Sutcliffe. Managers Kenny Mayne and Harold Reynolds also provided on field reporting. Pitcher Dave Winfield had a no-hitter going until the bottom of the third inning when Dale Earnhardt Jr. broke it up with a lead off single. Harold Reynolds' Brew Crew won the game 7–4.

==== Lineups ====
Wallbangers				Brew Crew			
Order	Player	Legend/Celebrity	Position	Order	Player	Legend/Celebrity	Position
1	Joy Enriquez	Celebrity	RF	1	Ryne Sandberg	Legend	LCF
2	Paul Molitor	Legend	2B	2	Ozzie Smith	Legend	SS
3	Howie Long	Celebrity	RF	3	Kevin James	Celebrity	LF
4	Cecil Fielder	Legend	C	4	Dave Winfield	Legend	P
5	Meat Loaf	Celebrity	P	5	Coolio	Celebrity	RCF
6	Cecil Cooper	Legend	1B	6	George Brett	Legend	RF
7	Dale Earnhardt Jr.	Celebrity	3B	7	Richard Schiff	Celebrity	2B
8	Chi McBride	Celebrity	--	8	Don Mattingly	Legend	3B
9	Rollie Fingers	Legend	LF	9	John Kruk	Legend	--
10	Tony Todd	Celebrity	SS	10	Nadia Dajani	Celebrity	--
11	Gorman Thomas	Legend	LF	11	Picabo Street	Celebrity	C
12	Glenn Lewis	Celebrity	--	12	Bradley Whitford	Celebrity	1B
13	Derek Parra	Celebrity	--	13	Harold Reynolds	Legend (Manager)	--
14	Kenny Mayne	Celebrity (Manager)	--				

=== 2003 ===
The 2003 Radioshack Legends and Celebrity Softball Game was played on Sunday, July 13, 2003, at U.S. Cellular Field in Chicago. ESPN broadcast the game after the Home Run Derby with commentators Dave O'Brien and Rick Sutcliffe. Managers Kenny Mayne and Harold Reynolds also provided on field reporting. In the bottom of the third inning, as The Bachelor star Andrew Firestone came to bat, manager Kenny Mayne brought in Firestone's then fiancé from the show, Jen Schefft, to pitch. Firestone popped out to the shortstop and the original pitcher was brought back in. In the next at bat Jimmy Kimmel singled but first baseman Bo Jackson successfully pulled the hidden ball trick on him to record an out. In the top of the fourth inning Jackson came to bat with a wooden bat that had pine tar on it that he claimed was given to him by George Brett. Manager Harold Reynolds challenged the amount of pine tar on the bat but the home plate umpire allowed it and Jackson then hit a home run. Kenny Mayne's Go-Go Sox won the game 7–4.

==== Lineups ====
Go-Go Sox				Southside Hitmen			
Order	Player	Legend/Celebrity	Position	Order	Player	Legend/Celebrity	Position
1	Wade Boggs	Legend	3B	1	Ozzie Smith	Legend	SS
2	Shannon Elizabeth	Celebrity	RF	2	Trista Rehn	Celebrity	--
3	Chris Chelios	Celebrity	LCF	3	Ryne Sandberg	Legend	2B
4	Bo Jackson	Legend	1B	4	Jim McMahon	Celebrity	1B
5	Harold Baines	Legend	RCF	5	Dave Winfield	Legend	LF
6	Dean Cain	Celebrity	SS	6	Brian McKnight	Celebrity	--
7	Gary Carter	Legend	--	7	Fred Lynn	Legend	RCF
8	Amy Kyler	Celebrity	--	8	Jaime Foutch	Celebrity	LCF
9	Adam Carolla	Celebrity	LF	9	Andrew Firestone	Celebrity	3B
10	Jack McDowell	Legend	P	10	Jimmy Kimmel	Celebrity	C
11	Rollie Fingers	Legend	--	11	Bret Saberhagen	Legend	--
12	Ms. Jade	Celebrity	2B	12	Goose Gossage	Legend	P
13	Ian Ziering	Celebrity	C	13	Sarah Silverman	Celebrity	RF
14	Kenny Mayne	Celebrity (Manager)	--	14	Harold Reynolds	Legend (Manager)	--

=== 2004 ===
The 2004 Taco Bell Legends and Celebrity Softball Game was played on Sunday, July 11, 2004, at Minute Maid Park in Houston, Texas. ESPN broadcast the game after the Home Run Derby with commentators Gary Thorne and Rick Sutcliffe. Managers Kenny Mayne and Harold Reynolds also provided on field reporting. This was the first year in which the teams were designated by the American and National Leagues, as opposed to having a themed names based on the host city. In the bottom of the fourth inning, after three consecutive inside pitches, batter Nick Lachey charged pitcher Goose Gossage resulting in a faux bench clearing. The National League won 15–8.

==== Lineups ====
National				American			
Order	Player	Legend/Celebrity	Position	Order	Player	Legend/Celebrity	Position
1	Ozzie Smith	Legend	SS	1	Fred Lynn	Legend	LCF
2	Nick Lachey	Celebrity	RF	2	Shandi Finnessey	Celebrity	RF
3	Jaime Foutch	Celebrity	2B	3	Will Clark	Legend	1B
4	Tony Todd	Celebrity	3B	4	Cecil Fielder	Legend	--
5	Cesar Cedeno	Legend	RCF	5	Matthew Modine	Celebrity	3B
6	Dave Winfield	Legend	1B	6	Harold Reynolds	Legend (Manager)	SS
7	Adam Rodriguez	Celebrity	--	7	Rollie Fingers	Legend	RCF
8	Kenny Mayne	Celebrity (Manager)	LCF	8	Jimmy Kimmel	Celebrity	C
9	Clyde Drexler	Celebrity	LF	9	Sarah Silverman	Celebrity	--
10	Leeann Tweeden	Celebrity	--	10	Goose Gossage	Legend	P
11	Bill Rancic	Celebrity	C	11	Christa Williams	Celebrity	2B
12	Mike Scott	Legend	--	12	Charlie Maher	Celebrity	LF
13	Larry Dierker	Legend	P	13	Sheryl Swoopes	Celebrity	UMP*
14	Fernando Valenzuela	Legend	--				

- Due to an ankle injury, Swoopes did not play in the game but was brought in as a replacement home plate umpire in the bottom of the fourth inning after a strike call was disputed by celebrity batter Bill Rancic. The original umpire returned for the fifth inning.

=== 2005 ===
The 2005 Taco Bell Legends and Celebrity Softball Game was played on Sunday, July 10, 2005, at Comerica Park in Detroit, Michigan. ESPN broadcast the game after the Home Run Derby with commentators Gary Thorne and Rick Sutcliffe and on field reporter Sam Ryan. The American League won 9–7.

==== Lineups ====
National				American			
Order	Player	Legend/Celebrity	Position	Order	Player	Legend/Celebrity	Position
1	Ozzie Smith	Legend	SS	1	Lovie Jung	Celebrity	2B
2	Jennie Finch	Celebrity	P	2	Fred Lynn	Legend	RCF
3	Dave Winfield	Legend	1B	3	Bo Jackson	Legend	1B
4	Andre Dawson	Legend	RF	4	Lou Whitaker	Legend	SS
5	Chris Chelios	Celebrity	2B	5	Jon Kelley	Celebrity	C
6	James Denton	Celebrity	3B	6	Chris Webber	Celebrity	RF
7	Jon Lovitz	Celebrity	--	7	Billy Bob Thornton	Celebrity	--
8	Rollie Fingers	Legend	LF	8	Jim Abbott	Legend	LF
9	Richard Schiff	Celebrity	--	9	Harold Reynolds	Legend (Manager)	3B
10	Leeann Tweeden	Celebrity	RCF	10	Jon Secada	Celebrity	LCF
11	Tommy John	Legend	--	11	Amanda Beard	Celebrity	--
12	Larry Joe Campbell	Celebrity	C	12	Mark Tremonti	Celebrity	--
13	Jessica White	Celebrity	--	13	Willie Hernández	Legend	--
14	Kenny Mayne	Celebrity (Manager)	LCF	14	Celines Toribio	Celebrity	--
				15	Mark Fidrych	Legend	P

=== 2006 ===
The 2006 Taco Bell Legends and Celebrity Softball Game was played on Sunday, July 9, 2006, at PNC Park in Pittsburgh, Pennsylvania. ESPN broadcast the game after the Home Run Derby with commentators Gary Thorne and Rick Sutcliffe. Managers Harold Reynolds and John Kruk also provided on field reporting. The National League won 7–5.

==== Lineups ====
National				American			
Order	Player	Legend/Celebrity	Position	Order	Player	Legend/Celebrity	Position
1	Bill Madlock	Legend	3B	1	Sarah Silverman	Celebrity	LF
2	Franco Harris	Celebrity	LCF	2	Dean Cain	Celebrity	SS
3	Dave Parker	Legend	DH	3	Fred Lynn	Legend	LCF
4	Dave Winfield	Legend	P	4	Rollie Fingers	Legend	RCF
5	Andre Dawson	Legend	C	5	Goose Gossage	Legend	1B
6	Ozzie Smith	Legend	SS	6	Cowboy Troy	Celebrity	C
7	Carlos Bernard	Celebrity	LF	7	Harold Reynolds	Legend (Manager)	3B
8	Gary Carter	Legend	RCF	8	Marcus Giamatti	Celebrity	RF
9	Rob Reiner	Celebrity	1B	9	Tommy John	Legend	P
10	Jimmy Kimmel	Celebrity	2B	10	Tony Potts	Celebrity	2B
11	Carey Hart	Celebrity	RF	11	Sal Iacono	Celebrity	--
12	Leeann Tweeden	Celebrity	--	12	Danny Masterson	Celebrity	--
13	John Kruk	Legend (Manager)	--	13	Trevor Morgan	Celebrity	--

=== 2007 ===
American				National			
Order	Player	Legend/Celebrity	Position	Order	Player	Legend/Celebrity	Position
1	Rickey Henderson	Legend		1	Ozzie Smith	Legend	SS
2	Rachel Smith	Celebrity		2	Rob Schneider	Celebrity	2B
3	Jerry Rice	Celebrity	2B	3	Gary Carter	Legend	
4	Andre Dawson	Legend	1B	4	Dave Winfield	Legend	LF
5	Fred Lynn	Legend		5	Leeann Tweeden	Celebrity	
6	Dane Cook	Celebrity		6	Kevin Mitchell	Legend	CF
7	Wade Boggs	Legend	3B	7	Matt Williams	Legend	3B
8	Kenny Mayne	Celebrity (Manager)	CF	8	Jimmy Kimmel	Celebrity (Manager)	C
9	Bobby Flay	Celebrity		9	Robby Thompson	Celebrity	
10	James Denton	Celebrity		10	Robb Nen	Legend	P
11	Goose Gossage	Legend		11	Gavin Newsom	Celebrity	1B
12	David Bryson	Celebrity		12	J. T. Snow	Legend	1B
13	Rollie Fingers	Legend	P	13	Jeff Garlin	Celebrity	
14	Paul Giamatti	Celebrity		-	-	-	-
15	Jon Kelley	Celebrity		-	-	-	-
16	Sal Iacano	Celebrity		-	-	-	-

=== 2008 ===
NL Rosters: Chris Rock, Marlee Matlin, Tim Raines, Ozzie Smith, Bobby Flay, George Lopez, Justin Tuck, Gary Carter, James Denton, A.J. Calloway, Kyle Massey, Paul Molitor, Tony Perez, Mike Greenberg (manager), AL Rosters: Maria Menounos, Billy Baldwin, Billy Crystal, Kenny Mayne, Paul O' Neill, Mike Golic (manager), Goose Gossage, Wade Boggs, Rollie Fingers, George Brett, Spike Lee, Whoopi Goldberg, Tino Martinez,

=== 2009 ===
AL Rosters: Ashanti, Shawn Johnson, Andy Richter, Brian Littrell, Kristen Butler, Rollie Fingers, James Denton, Goose Gossage, Fred Lynn, Ginuwine, Mike Golic (Manager), NL Rosters: Jenna Fischer, Nelly, Bob Knight, Billy Bob Thornton, Ozzie Smith, Dave Winfield, Ernie Banks, Annie Wersching, Jon Hamm, Chingy, Treena Peel, Megan Gibson, Mike Greenberg (Manager)

=== 2010 ===
AL Rosters: Tim Salmon, Rich Gossage, Bo Jackson, Maria Menounos, James Denton, Rickey Henderson, MC Hammer, Rollie Fingers, Chuck Finley, Marcus Giamatti, Michael Clark Duncan, Kevin Frazier, Natasha Watley, Quintin Aaron, Fred Lynn
NL Rosters: Ozzie Smith, Jennie Finch, John Kruk, Gary Carter, Mario Lopez, Andy Richter, Mike Piazza, Marisa Miller, Guy Fieri, David Nail, Dave Winfield, Jon Hamm, Steve Garvey, Paul Molitor
AL won 15–11

=== 2011 ===
The 2011 Taco Bell Legends and Celebrity Softball Game was played on Sunday, July 10, 2011, at Chase Field in Phoenix, Arizona. ESPN broadcast the game after the Home Run Derby. There were no commentators for the game but managers James Denton and Erin Andrews provided continuous, on field reporting. For this game an inflatable kiddie pool was placed just beyond the shorter softball fence in right-center field as an imitation of the pool just beyond the MLB regulation fence in right-center field. Andrews explained during the telecast that a ball hit into the pool would be worth 4 runs. The National League won 5–3.

==== Lineups ====
National				American			
Order	Player	Legend/Celebrity	Position	Order	Player	Legend/Celebrity	Position
1	Ozzie Smith	Legend	SS	1	Rickey Henderson	Legend	LF
2	Larry Fitzgerald	Celebrity	RCF	2	Kate Upton	Celebrity	2B
3	Jordin Sparks	Celebrity	RF	3	Nick Jonas	Celebrity	3B
4	Chord Overstreet	Celebrity	LCF	4	Rollie Fingers	Legend	P
5	Luis Gonzalez	Legend	LF	5	Chris Pratt	Celebrity	1B
6	James Denton	Celebrity (Manager)	--	6	Fred Lynn	Legend	RCF
7	Jesse Williams	Celebrity	--	7	Greg Grunberg	Celebrity	--
8	Josh Hopkins	Celebrity	3B	8	Jake T. Austin	Celebrity	C
9	Mike Piazza	Legend	C	9	Tim DeKay	Celebrity	--
10	Jason Aldean	Celebrity	--	10	Amaury Nolasco	Celebrity	SS
11	Paul DiMeo	Celebrity	--	11	Tom Papa	Celebrity	RF
12	Mark Grace	Legend	1B	12	Bernie Williams	Legend	LCF
13	Dave Annable	Celebrity	2B	13	Carlos Bocanegra	Celebrity	--
14	Steve Garvey	Legend	--	14	A.J. Calloway	Celebrity	--
15	Jennie Finch	Celebrity	P	15	Erin Andrews	Celebrity (Manager)	--

=== 2012 ===
The 2012 Taco Bell Legends and Celebrity Softball Game was played on Sunday, July 8, 2012, at Kauffman Stadium in Kansas City, Missouri. ESPN broadcast the game (after the 2012 SiriusXM All-Star Futures Game) with commentators Bill Simmons and John Anderson and on field reporter Tim Kurkjian. In the bottom of the second inning Mike Sweeny, Bill Self, and Chord Overstreet hit back-to-back-to-back home runs, a first in L&S Softball history. This game was the first to feature players from the Wounded Warrior Amputee Softball Team. Saul Bosquez, US Army, Operation Iraqi Freedom, and Matt Kinsey, US Army, Operation Enduring Freedom, are both members of the Washington Nationals WWAST. Bosquez played for the AL and Kinsey played for the NL. Kinsey hit a home run and won the MVP award. The National League won 21–8.

==== Lineups ====
National				American			
Order	Player	Legend/Celebrity	Position	Order	Player	Legend/Celebrity	Position
1	Ozzie Smith	Legend	SS	1	Rickey Henderson	Legend	LCF
2	Jon Hamm	Celebrity	3B	2	Eric Stonestreet	Celebrity	C
3	Dave Winfield	Legend	RF	3	Matt Cassel	Celebrity	--
4	Jennie Finch	Celebrity	P	4	George Brett	Legend	3B
5	Andre Dawson	Legend	--	5	Haley Reinhart	Celebrity	--
6	James Denton	Celebrity	RCF	6	Mike Sweeney	Legend	1B
7	Rick Sutcliffe	Legend (Manager)	C	7	Bill Self	Celebrity	2B
8	Horatio Sanz	Celebrity	LCF	8	Chord Overstreet	Celebrity	RCF
9	Matt Kinsey	Wounded Warrior	1B	9	Saul Bosquez	Wounded Warrior	SS
10	David Nail	Celebrity	LF	10	David Cook	Celebrity	LF
11	Steve Garvey	Legend	--	11	Joe Carter	Legend	RF
12	Paul DiMeo	Celebrity	--	12	Rollie Fingers	Legend	P
13	Carlos Bocanegra	Celebrity	2B	13	Chrissy Teigen	Celebrity	--
				--	Bo Jackson	Legend (Manager)	PH*

- Bo Jackson was not in the starting lineup due to a hip injury but pinch hit for Joe Carter in the bottom of the sixth inning. Carter was Jackson's courtesy runner; however, Jackson popped out to shortstop to end the game.

=== 2013 ===
In 2013, the Legends/Celebrities Softball Game was won by the "home team" National League in six innings with a strong performance by Jennie Finch (Olympian Softball Player) who pitched a complete game for the NL. She was helped offensively from Mike Piazza (New York Mets Legend), Andre Dawson (Legend), and Josh Wege (Wounded Warrior) hitting home runs. Boomer Esiason (NL manager, television personality) and John Franco (NL co-captain, MLB Legend) were the captains of the victorious National League. Felipe Eraso (a top fundraiser for All-Star 5k Fun Run) hit an inside-the-ballpark home run also scoring actor George Lopez, due to a missed diving catch attempt in the outfield and an errant throw to American League catcher Ashanti. Other players for the National League were Alyssa Milano (actress), Kevin James (actor/comedian), and Legends Darryl Strawberry, Ozzie Smith, and Dwight Gooden. Josh Wege, an amputee wounded in Afghanistan was the co-MVP with Kevin James.

The American League softball team was led by Craig Carton (radio personality/manager) and Bernie Williams (MLB Legend). Rollie Fingers (MLB Legend) had several costly errors and Ashanti (singer) didn't fare well defensively or at the plate. Other legends for the AL team included Rickey Henderson, Frank Thomas, and Fred Lynn. Actors Chord Overstreet (Glee), James Denton (Desperate Housewives), AJ Calloway (Extra), Gary Valentine (Actor/Comedian), and 2013 Miss America Mallory Hagan participated in the game. Actor/Comedian Chris Rock was reportedly scheduled to appear in the softball game, but wasn't shown playing.

=== 2014 ===
In 2014, the Legends/Celebrities softball game was held at Target Field in Minneapolis, Minnesota on Sunday, July 13. ESPN broadcast the game following the live broadcast of the 2014 Major League Baseball Home Run Derby. This year's game was won by the "away team" National League in six innings with a strong performance by Nelly (rapper) and David Nail (Country Music singer) who both hit two home runs for the NL.

==== Lineups ====
National				American			
Order	Player	Legend/Celebrity	Position	Order	Player	Legend/Celebrity	Position
1	Ozzie Smith	Legend	SS	1	Rickey Henderson	Legend	LF
2	Nelly	Celebrity	3B	2	Adrian Peterson	Celebrity	LCF
3	Larry Fitzgerald	Celebrity		3	Fat Joe	Celebrity	
4	Mike Piazza	Legend	C	4	Zach Parise	Celebrity	SS
5	Nick Clark	Wounded Warrior		5	Jim Thome	Legend	DH
6	Jennie Finch	Celebrity	P	6	Greg Reynolds	Wounded Warrior	
7	Chris Distefano	Celebrity		7	James Denton	Celebrity	3B
8	John Smoltz	Legend	P	8	Fred Lynn	Legend	
9	David Nail	Celebrity	LF	9	January Jones	Celebrity	C
10	Andre Dawson	Legend		10	Rob Riggle	Celebrity	LF
11	Andy Cohen	Celebrity		11	Jack Morris	Legend	P
12	Charlie McDermott	Celebrity		12	Sway	Celebrity	RF
13	Melanie Iglesias	Celebrity		13	Maya Moore	Celebrity	1B
14	Dwight Gooden	Legend		14	Rollie Fingers	Legend	P
15	Julie Bennett	Celebrity	P	15	Andrew Zimmern	Celebrity	2B

=== 2015 ===
The 2015 Legends/Celebrities Game was held at Great American Ball Park in Cincinnati. Vladimir Guerrero was voted MVP as the American guests won.

==== Lineups ====
American				National			
Order	Player	Celebrity/Legend	Position	Order	Player	Celebrity/Legend	Position
1	Paul O'Neill	Legend		1	Eric Davis	Legend	
2	Macklemore	Celebrity	3B	2	Josh Hutcherson	Celebrity	
3	Vladimir Guerrero	Legend		3	Sean Casey	Legend	
4	Todd Reed	Wounded Warrior		4	Miles Teller	Celebrity	
5	Rob Riggle	Celebrity/Manager		5	Urban Meyer	Celebrity	
6	Jordin Sparks	Celebrity		6	Jennie Finch	Celebrity	P
7	Fred Lynn	Legend		7	Aaron Boone	Legend/Manager	
8	Cole Swindell	Celebrity		8	Snoop Dogg	Celebrity	P
9	Bernie Williams	Legend		9	Andre Dawson	Legend	CF
10	Charissa Thompson	Celebrity		10	Kirk Herbstreit	Celebrity	
11	Rollie Fingers	Legend	P	11	Tim Horton	Wounded Warrior	
12	Justin Moore	Celebrity		12	Andy Dalton	Celebrity	
13	Chad Lowe	Celebrity		13	Olivia Holt	Celebrity	RF
14	-	-	-	14	Ozzie Smith	Legend	SS
15	-	-	-	15	Nick Lachey	Celebrity	

=== 2016 ===
Petco Park in San Diego was where the 16th Legends/Celebrities Softball Game was played.

==== Lineups ====
American			National		
Order	Player	Celebrity/Legend	Order	Player	Celebrity/Legend
1	Rickey Henderson	Legend	1	Ozzie Smith	Legend
2	Nina Agdal	Celebrity	2	Drew Brees	Celebrity
3	J.K. Simmons	Celebrity	3	Trevor Hoffman	Legend
4	Curtis Pride	Legend	4	Mark-Paul Gosselaar	Celebrity
5	Chris Gary	Wounded Warrior	5	Andy Cohen	Celebrity
6	Jamie Foxx	Celebrity	6	Morris Chestnut	Celebrity
7	Rico Rodriguez	Celebrity	7	Sterling K. Brown	Celebrity
8	Peyton Meyer	Celebrity	8	Rollie Fingers	Legend
9	Landon Donovan	Celebrity	9	Mark Consuelos	Celebrity
10	Terry Crews	Celebrity	10	David Wells	Legend
11	Karan Brar	Celebrity	11	Cameron Boyce	Celebrity
12	Tyler Hoechlin	Celebrity	12	Jennie Finch	Celebrity
13	Raini Rodriguez	Celebrity	13	Pete Wentz	Celebrity
14	Fred Lynn	Legend	14	Billy Bean	Legend
15	Kate Powell	Celebrity	15	Damaris Lewis	Celebrity
16	Tim Raines	Legend	16	Martin Diaz	Wounded Warrior
17	Omar Miller	Celebrity	17	Kyle Mooney	Celebrity
18	-	-	18	Andre Dawson	Legend
19	-	-	19	Billy Brown	Celebrity
20	-	-	20	Tim Foreman	Celebrity

=== 2017 ===
The 17th Celebrities/Legends game was played at Marlins Park in Miami. A 13-run 2nd propelled the Nationals to score a record 28 overall in their victory. The 50 total runs scored by both teams also was a game record. Neither Ozzie Smith nor Rollie Fingers were playing for the first time.

=== 2018 ===
The 18th Celebrities/Legends game was played at Nationals Park in Washington, D.C. Quincy Brown, Ashley Greene, Christopher Jackson, Skai Jackson, Taylor Kinney, Tim Kurkjian, Brandon Larracuente, J. R. Martínez, The Miz, Bill Nye, DJ Diesel, Josh Norman, Dascha Polanco, Scott Rogowsky and John Wall joined Foxx among the celebrities participated. Wounded Warriors were Jonathan Herst & Cody Rice.

Jennie Finch & Jessica Mendoza were the starting pitchers. The retired Major Leaguers were André Dawson, Steve Finley, Cliff Floyd, Torii Hunter, Carlos Peña, Tim Raines & Bernie Williams.

Down by 11 to the AL in the bottom of the 6th, the Nationals tried to rally, but came up 4 runs short. And The Miz quickly ended the 5th by retiring the side on one pitch per batter.

=== 2019 ===
The 19th Celebrities/Legends game was played at Progressive Field in Cleveland, OH. Jennie Finch & Jessica Mendoza returned as starting pitchers. The Miz managed Cleveland; celebrity participants included Drew Carey & Kenny Lofton among others.

In that game, the visiting team represents the World team and the host city the home team.

=== 2020 ===
The 20th Celebrities/Legends game was to be played at Dodger Stadium in Los Angeles. That was cancelled and the site deferred to 2022 as the COVID-19 pandemic was to blame.

=== 2021 ===
The 20th Celebrities/Legends game was played at Coors Field in Denver, CO, after the All-Star Game was relocated to Denver from Atlanta. Some of the celebrities who participated in the event were Quavo, Anuel AA, Kane Brown, JoJo Siwa, Jorge Masvidal, Steve Aoki, El Alfa, and Jhay Cortez, among others.

=== 2022 ===
The 21st Celebrities/Legends game was played at Dodger Stadium in Los Angeles, CA, deferred from 2020. The Teams are named the Brooklyn and Los Angeles Dodgers due the Dodgers' History.

Brooklyn won 15–13, and The Miz was voted Most Valuable Player.

==== Lineups ====
Brooklyn Dodgers			Los Angeles Dodgers		
Order	Player	Celebrity/Legend	Order	Player	Celebrity/Legend
1	Hannah Stocking	Celebrity	1	Bad Bunny	Celebrity
2	Quavo	Celebrity	2	Jojo Siwa	Celebrity
3	Desus Nice	Celebrity	3	Chloe Kim	Celebrity
4	Action Bronson	Celebrity	4	Guillermo Rodriguez	Celebrity
5	Anthony Ramos	Celebrity	5	Andre Ethier	Legend
6	Yahya Abdul-Mateen II	Celebrity	6	Bryan Cranston	Celebrity
7	Jennie Finch	Celebrity	7	Shawn Green	Legend
8	Hunter Pence	Legend	8	Lauren Chamberlain	Celebrity
9	Coi Leray	Celebrity	9	Natasha Watley	Celebrity
10	Simu Liu	Celebrity	10	Vladimir Guerrero	Legend
11	The Miz	Celebrity	11	David Ortiz	Legend
12	CC Sabathia	Legend	12	J.K. Simmons	Celebrity
13	Lisa Fernandez	Celebrity	13	Bryan Cranston	Celebrity
14	Adrian Beltre	Legend	14	Jerry Lorenzo	Celebrity

=== 2023 ===
The 22nd Corona® game was played at the same site as the inaugural back in 2001: at T-Mobile Park.

Team Félix held on for a 21–19 victory, with Bret Boone walking off with the MVP.

=== 2024 ===
The 23rd Corona game was played in July at Globe Life Field in Arlington, Texas.

The NL had a 10-run lead in the bottom of the 5th inning but the AL scored 8 in the inning and tried to come back but the NL held on for the 12–10 victory. Bobby Bones of the NL was declared the Most Valuable Player.

=== 2025 ===
The 24th & last GEICO game was played at Truist Park in northern Atlanta.

The Americans were up 17-15 going into the bottom of the fifth, and CC Sabathia finished off the Nationals on a 1-2-3 fifth to get a save to preserve it for the victory, and declaration of being the Most Valuable Player of the game.

==== 2026 ====
The revised 3-on-3 GEICO game site is in Philadelphia, PA at Citizens Bank Park.

== Results ==
NOTE: No game in 2020. 2026 and hereafter will change to co-ed 3×3 play.

Year	Winning Manager	Losing Manager	Score	Site (Host Team)
2001	Kenny Mayne (Espressos)	Harold Reynolds (Lattes)	8–6 Espressos	Safeco Field (Seattle)
2002	Harold Reynolds (Brew Crew)	Kenny Mayne (Wallbangers)	7–4 Brew Crew	American Family Field (Milwaukee)
2003	Kenny Mayne (Go-Go Sox)	Harold Reynolds (Southside Hitmen)	7–4 Go-Go Sox	Rate Field (Chicago White Sox)
2004	Kenny Mayne (N.L.)	Harold Reynolds (A.L.)	15–8 National	Daikin Park (Houston)
2005	Harold Reynolds (A.L)	Kenny Mayne (N.L.)	9–7 American	Comerica Park (Detroit)
2006	John Kruk (N.L.)	Harold Reynolds (A.L.)	7–5 National	PNC Park (Pittsburgh)
2007	Kenny Mayne (A.L.)	Jimmy Kimmel (N.L.)	13–9 American	AT&T Park (San Francisco)
2008	Mike Greenberg (N.L.)	Mike Golic (A.L.)	8–7 National	Yankee Stadium (N.Y. Yankees)
2009	Mike Greenberg (N.L.)	Mike Golic (A.L.)	10–8 National	Busch Stadium (St. Louis)
2010	Goose Gossage (A.L.)	John Kruk (N.L.)	15–11 American	Angel Stadium (L.A. Angels)
2011	James Denton (N.L.)	Erin Andrews (A.L.)	5–3 National	Chase Field (Arizona)
2012	Rick Sutcliffe (N.L.)	Bo Jackson (A.L.)	21–8 National	Kauffman Stadium (Kansas City)
2013	Boomer Esiason (N.L.)	Craig Carton (A.L.)	8–5 National	Citi Field (N.Y. Mets)
2014	TBD (N.L.)	TBD (A.L.)	15–4 National	Target Field (Minnesota)
2015	Rob Riggle (A.L.)	Aaron Boone (N.L.)	25–21 American	Great American Ball Park (Cincinnati)
2016	Jamie Foxx (A.L)	Jennie Finch (N.L.)	8–7 American	Petco Park (San Diego)
2017	Jennie Finch (N.L.)	Jamie Foxx (A.L.)	28–22 National	LoanDepot Park (Miami)
2018	Jamie Foxx (A.L.)	Jennie Finch (N.L.)	14–10 American	Nationals Park (Washington)
2019	Jennie Finch (World)	The Miz (CLE)	21–16 World	Progressive Field (Cleveland)
2021	Vinny Castilla (Team Helton)	LaTroy Hawkins (Team Finch)	20–10 Team Helton	Coors Field (Colorado)
2022	Jennie Finch (Brooklyn)	Bad Bunny (L.A.)	15-13 Brooklyn	Dodger Stadium (L.A. Dodgers)
2023	Félix Hernández (Team Félix)	Jennie Finch (Team Finch)	21-19 Team Félix	T-Mobile Park (Seattle)
2024	Deion Sanders (N.L.)	Jennie Finch (A.L.)	12–10 National	Globe Life Field (Texas)
2025	Jermaine Dupri (AL)	Javy López (NL)	17-15 American	Truist Park (Atlanta)
