= Eduardo Garcia (American chef) =

American chef

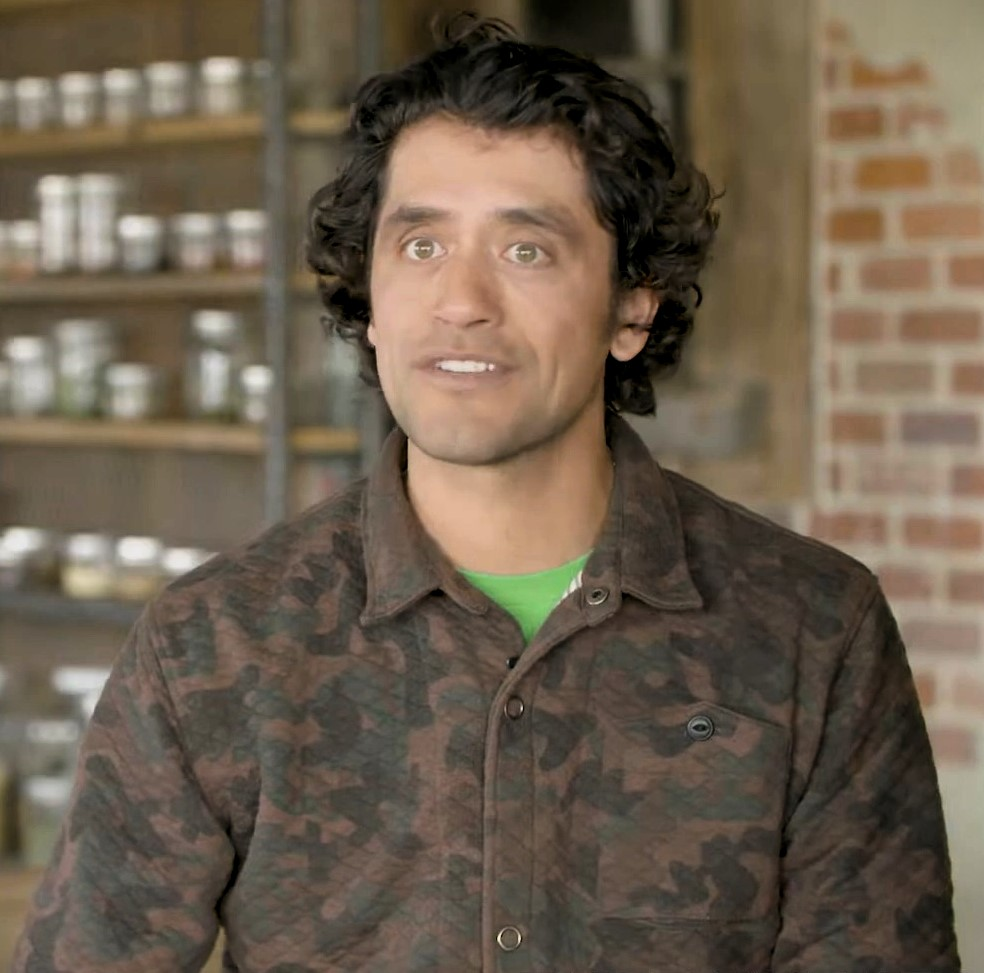
Garcia in 2019

Eduardo Garcia (born 1981) is an American celebrity chef and the co-founder of Montana Mex, a Mexican food company. He is known as the "bionic chef" because he cooks with a prosthetic left arm, the result of an accident while hunting in 2011. His story has received significant coverage from outlets including, The Huffington Post, People magazine, Good Morning America, and others.

== Early life ==
Eduardo Garcia was born in 1981. His father was a fisherman and chef, and his mother was an astrologer, Montessori teacher and author. He grew up in Bozeman, Montana and worked on the Chico Hot Springs ranch as a prep chef. After high school, Garcia attended The Art Institute of Seattle. During college, he worked at a Japanese cafe called Saitos.

== Career ==
=== Early career ===
While in college, Garcia was offered a job as chef of a 107-foot yacht called Dorothea. He accepted and, upon graduation, spent two and half years aboard the ship. From there, he spent the next decade working as a chef on various private yachts. His job allowed him to travel the world, learning about different ethnic cuisines along the way.

Garcia co-founded Montana Mex, a Mexican-inspired line of flavored salts, salsas and hot sauces, upon returning to Montana in 2010. He also began creating a cooking show to be called Active Ingredient. Garcia describes his food as fun, simple, exploratory, and always influenced by the local environment.

=== Hunting accident ===
On October 9, 2011, while bow-hunting elk in the Montana backcountry, Garcia came across the dry remains of a bear. Attempting to remove a claw with his knife, he received a severe electrical shock from a 2400-volt power line hidden underneath its carcass. He was knocked to the ground and severely burned. He remembers telling himself to get up, but after that his memory is incomplete - the next thing he remembers is walking on a road a mile away from the accident spot. By the time he found help, Garcia had walked three miles.

While in hospital, Garcia was also diagnosed with stage two testicular cancer. The cancer required him to put his surgeries on hold to undergo three months of chemotherapy. He recalls, "I had to get through [the cancer] to get back to business, which was surgery and recovery of self."

=== Career since accident ===
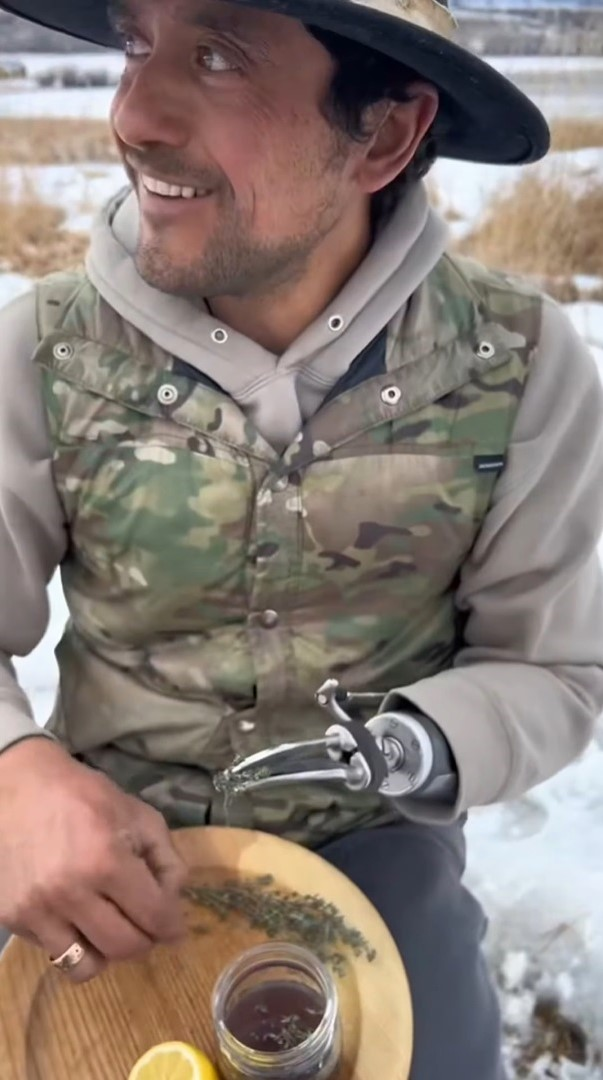
Garcia in 2024

Garcia's left arm was fitted with a simple prosthetic hook. Although he is right-handed, Garcia quickly found that he could not do everything he could before, but continued to work as a chef. He slowly re-learned basic tasks like chopping and dicing.

In September 2013, Garcia was fitted with a bionic hand designed by Touch Bionics and fitted by Advanced Arm Dynamics. The new hand is controlled by Garcia's forearm muscles and is capable of gripping 25 different ways. It allows him to perform tasks requiring a great deal of manual dexterity. The accident made him a more humble person and more willing to rely on other members of his team in the kitchen.

Garcia also resumed work on his Active Ingredient pilot. In the show, he draws on his life experiences and his enjoyment of the outdoors to promote healthy food and an active lifestyle. He also preaches "a can-do attitude" of giving "it all you’ve got ... and [having] fun doing it." As of 2013, Garcia was actively searching for a TV network interested in airing the show.

In 2014, Garcia decided his five-fingered bionic hand was not ideal for cooking – it was not waterproof and got cut on several occasions – and switched to a bionic hook instead. "When you're cooking ... it's a dance almost," he explains. "With the hand I just didn't feel fluid, whereas with the hook ... I just rock and roll again." His Montana Mex spices and seasonings can be ordered on Amazon and bought in stores throughout the United States.

== Media attention ==
In September 2013, Garcia's story was featured on The Huffington Post. In November, he was profiled by People magazine. In December, he appeared on Good Morning America and his story was featured in Fox News Latino. In January 2014, he appeared on The Chew In May, he appeared on Katie.

Garcia has also appeared on Hallmark Channel’s "Home & Family" and his recipes have appeared on HGTV.com, Refinery29, and Latina.com.

In 2015 a Kickstarter campaign was used to fund a documentary feature film about Garcia. The resulting film, Charged: The Eduardo Garcia Story, was released in 2018.

Garcia has appeared on Chopped as a guest judge.

Garcia is the host of Big Sky Kitchen With Eduardo Garcia on the Magnolia Network.

== Personal life ==
Garcia is an avid outdoorsman and hunter. He enjoys hiking, surfing, and skateboarding. He has volunteered with the Challenged Athletes Foundation and has participated in their Triathlon and Surf events and Common Threads, a program that teaches children in under privileged communities how to cook healthy meals.
