= Scrappers =

- Genre: Reality television
- Created by: Andy Weiss; Michael Weiss
- Developed by: George Verschoor; Will Spjut
- Directed by: David Thies
- Starring: Frank Fidilio, Joe Posa, Darren Zerafa, Salvatore Vassallo, Greg Dakouvanos, Mimmo Saladino, Dino Minini
- Country of origin: United States
- Original language: English
- No. of seasons: 1
- No. of episodes: 10

Production
- Executive producers: George Verschoor; Andy Weiss; Michael Weiss
- Producers: Will Spjut; Gordon Cassidy; Russ Ward
- Production locations: Brooklyn, New York and surrounding areas
- Cinematography: Patrick Armitage; David Thies
- Running time: 30 minutes
- Production company: Hoosick Falls Productions

Original release
- Network: Spike TV
- Release: August 3 – September 21, 2010

Scrappers is a reality television series about three competing groups of scrappers from Brooklyn, New York who collect and sell scrap metal. The series premiered 3 August 2010 at 10pm on Spike TV. The show was eventually scrapped itself on September 21 of the same year, after it failed to be renewed for a second season.

== Scrap crews ==
The first scrap crew featured in the show is "Scrappers U.S.A.", made up of Frankie Noots (Frank Fidilio), Joe Posa, and Darren. The second group is "P&F Service and Removal", headed by Sal the Barber and his employee Greg. The third group is Mimmo (pronounced mee-mo) and Dino, who are unaffiliated.

== Shooting locations ==
Scrappers is shot entirely on location in Brooklyn, New York, mostly in the neighborhoods of Gravesend, Bensonhurst, and the other areas immediately surrounding.

== Episodes ==
Episode	Original airdate	Summary
"The Aluminum Job"	3 August 2010	Frankie's crew scores a big aluminum job, but a feud with the site boss almost kills it - especially when they hire bumbling scrappers Dino and Mimmo. Sal blows a fuse when a minor job for a Brooklyn character turns into a major pain.
"The Stadium Job"	3 August 2010	Lengthy railings prove to be troublesome for Frankie's crew, and a brick job has highs and lows for Sal's crew.
"The Bike Job"	10 August 2010	A deli freezer vexes Sal; Darren and Frankie find porn after doing a bike job; Greg gets a truck-driving lesson; Dino and Mimmo enter cyberspace via Craigslist.
"The Slap Fight"	10 August 2010	Sal tows his first car, with disastrous results; a clash with Frankie becomes a slap fight; Darren makes a mess while removing a boiler from a building.
"Darren Turns Management"	17 August 2010	Darren becomes managerial as Frank puts him in charge of a safe to scrap with Dino and Mimmo.
"Sal's Sick Day"	24 August 2010	Sal becomes ill, and Frankie's team covers his jobs; Posa presides over Dino and Mimmo for a pizza shop job. Darren wonders what a "booger" is.
"Holy Scrap!"	31 August 2010	Frankie finds a Picasso print that he brings to a Manhattan art expert; Dino and Mimmo find work via an elderly woman who needs a ride to a Retirement Home.
"Don Scrapperleoni"	7 September 2010	An antique chandelier pits Sal against a slick lamp dealer; Darren gets permission to scrap a car in a bid to make some wedding cash; Mimmo and Dino visit Manhattan.
"The Van"	14 September 2010	Frankie purchases a van from a client, but the deal doesn't go smoothly; Sal tries to expands his turf to Staten Island; Mimmo and Dino try out business cards.
"The Yard"	21 September 2010	Posa tries to collect a debt from Sal, which escalates into all-out war. Darren gets his eyebrows waxed and has too many beers ahead of his nuptials.

== See also ==
- American Pickers, a similar show on the History Channel
