= Instant Dream Home =

American reality television series

- Genre: Home renovation
- Created by: Tom Forman; George Verschoor
- Starring: Danielle Brooks; Nick Cutsumpas; Paige Mobley; Adair Curtis; Erik Curtis
- Country of origin: United States
- Original language: English
- No. of seasons: 1
- No. of episodes: 8

Production
- Executive producers: Tom Forman; George Verschoor; David Metzler; Robert Asher; Jon Beyer; Jenny Daly; Sue Langham; Courtney Sanders
- Editors: Brandon Thieme; Mark Town
- Running time: 39–47 minutes
- Production company: Critical Content Kinetic Content

Original release
- Network: Netflix
- Release: August 10, 2022

Instant Dream Home is a Netflix reality television series that premiered on August 10, 2022. Hosted by actress Danielle Brooks, the show features a team of designers and builders who transform families' homes in just 12 hours. The series combines elements of home renovation, interior design, and lifestyle programming, emphasizing rapid construction and emotional reveals. In 2023, Instant Dream Home won a Daytime Emmy Award for Outstanding Instructional/How-To Program.

== Premise ==
Each episode of Instant Dream Home follows a deserving family whose home is in disrepair. It features Brooks, host, Nick Cutsumpas, exterior decorator and landscape architect, Paige Mobley, "special projects" lead and former Cycle 23 America's Next Top Model contestant, Adair Curtis, interior designer, and Erik Curtis, carpenter. A close friend or family member helps the team as an accomplice; they take photos and occupy the family outside of the home, allowing the team to get to work to surprise them. In just 12 hours, the team completely transforms the home. The show highlights the challenges and logistics of completing a full home makeover under extremely tight time constraints.

== Production ==
The series is produced by Critical Content and Kinetic Content, with Tom Forman, George Verschoor, David Metzler, Jenny Daly, Jon Beyer, Bob Asher, Sue Langham, and Courtney Sanders executive producing the eight episodes. Filming takes place at the homeowners' properties, with additional segments showcasing the planning, design, and construction processes. To scale mock-ups were created for planning purposes for particularly tricky problems. The show employs a combination of confessional interviews, behind-the-scenes footage, and on-camera interactions with the team.

== Reception ==
Instant Dream Home has received mixed reviews for its entertaining approach to home renovation and design. Critics have praised the show for balancing creativity and practicality while providing insight into the home remodeling process. Its 2023 Daytime Emmy Award win for Outstanding Instructional/How-To Program recognized the series' contribution to lifestyle and instructional programming. Yet, critics are skeptical of the actual timeframe and also voice concern over the longevity of the renovations. With such major projects occurring, permits and/or HOA permissions would have to be acquired with multiple construction crews working in the same small space making the 12 hour time limit seem unrealistic. However, with the time limit, small details have to be overlooked and pre-fabricated rooms used, in addition some homes required major structural changes, adding weight to existing support beams or even necessitating the creation of new support beams that had to be designed the day-of. The concerns over durability are all speculation as no homeowners who were on the show have come forward to report issues.

== Episodes ==
No.	Title	Original release date
1	"Baby on Board"	August 10, 2022
A soon-to-be grandmother and her family undergo a massive renovation to make their home more accessible.
2	"Schoolhouse Rock"	August 10, 2022
A family of seven's home is transformed and expanded. A crane drops a schoolhouse into their backyard.
3	"A Room With a View"	August 10, 2022
As the first homeowner in the family, a firefighter EMT, along with his partner and mother, get a window helicoptered in.
4	"9 Is Enough"	August 10, 2022
A couple and their nine kids need more room and storage solutions; rain threatens the team's plans.
5	"Dirty Work"	August 10, 2022
A backyard wonderland and a stylish home are created for this couple.
6	"Flowers in Bloom"	August 10, 2022
A single mom and her kids need more space. Inside and outside are transformed to work more efficiently.
7	"The Art of Grieving"	August 10, 2022
A new art studio and more updates to this family's 1980s home.
8	"Four Years in One Day"	August 10, 2022
A previous contractor skipped out on renovations, but the team transforms the home in less than a day.
