= The World's Most Amazing Vacation Rentals =

American Netflix series

- Starring: Jo Franco; Megan Batoon; Luis D. Ortiz

Production
- Executive producers: George Verschoor; William Spjut

Original release
- Network: Netflix
- Release: June 18 – September 14, 2021

The World's Most Amazing Vacation Rentals is a 2022 American Netflix series following three hosts as they travel the world visiting unique, budget, and luxury vacation properties. Netflix streamed two seasons of the series, the first of which premiered on June 18, 2021.

== Premise ==
Each episode, the show's three hosts, Jo Franco, Megan Batoon, and Luis D. Ortiz, share their top choice for a vacation rental to spend a few nights in. Franco's expertise is "Travel", and her goal is to pick the most unique rentals in the world to visit. Ortiz has a background in New York real estate and chooses the best "Luxury" rentals to stay the night. Batoon loves DIY (Do It Yourself) projects and is tasked with taking the other hosts to the best options for "Budget" vacation rentals.

The three hosts travel across the United States, as well as to spots in Mexico, Japan, Bali, and a number of other countries. Never staying at a hotel, they aim to uncover the best Airbnb and VRBO destinations.

Among other notable rentals, they would feature such spots as the G Bar M Ranch, the 3,200-acre dude ranch in Clyde Park, Montana that opened in 1934 (in Season 1's "American Adventure" episode), the Frank Lloyd Wright-designed Bernard Schwartz House in Two Rivers, Wisconsin as well as Philip Johnson's Glass House in New Canaan, Connecticut (both in Season 2's "Super Modern Stays" episode), the Futuro house in Joshua Tree (in Season 2's "Paranormal Places" episode), the Louise Harpman-built Casa Xixim in Tulum, Quintana Roo (in Season 2's "Eco Friendly" episode), and the remaining mill (which has been turned into a vacation rental) inside the Kingsley Grist Mill Historic District in Clarendon, Vermont (in Season 2's "On the Waterfront" episode).

== Hosts ==
- Joanna "Jo" Franco
- Megan Batoon
- Luis D. Ortiz
