= Eric Cervini =

American historian and writer

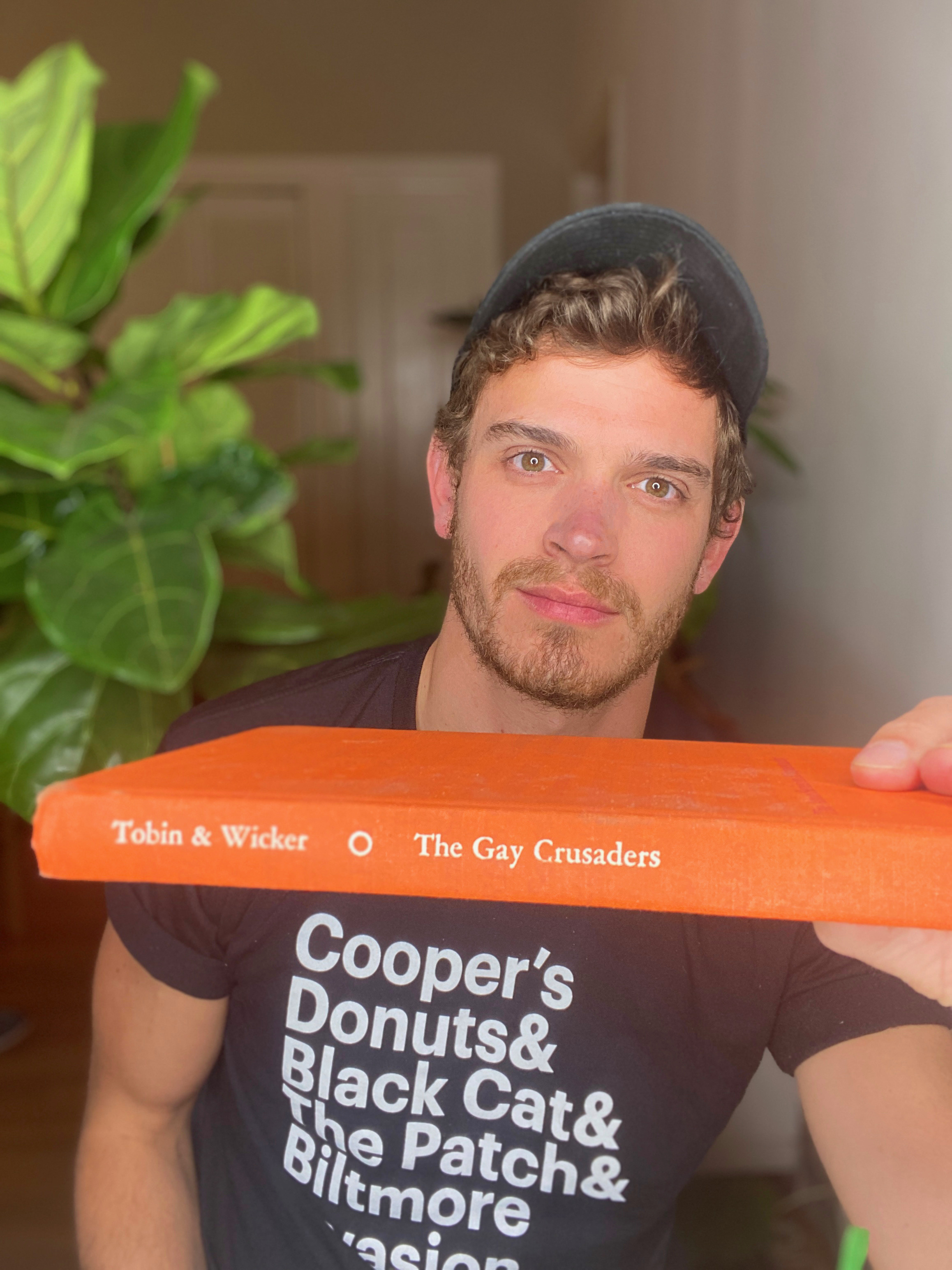
- Cervini in 2020
- Born: 1992 (age 33–34); California, U.S.
- Education: Harvard University (BA); Emmanuel College, Cambridge (MPhil, PhD)
- Occupation: Historian
- Awards: Randy Shilts Award (2021)

Eric Cervini (born 1992) is an American historian and author of LGBTQ politics and culture. His 2020 book, The Deviant's War: The Homosexual vs. The United States of America, was a New York Times Bestseller and a finalist for the Pulitzer Prize. He also runs a queer history newsletter, Queer History 101, which focuses on sharing LGBTQ history.

Cervini is a member of the Harvard Gender and Sexuality Caucus' Board of Directors, as well as an advisor to the Mattachine Society in Washington, D.C.

== Life ==
Cervini was born in California and raised in Round Rock, Texas, by a single mother, Lynn Cervini. He attended Westwood High School, where he graduated with an International Baccalaureate diploma in 2010. As of 2020, he currently lives in Los Angeles.

Cervini came out as gay days before enrolling at Harvard College, where he graduated in 2014 with a B.A. in history. After a year in 2015 earning his Master of Philosophy in historical studies as the Lionel de Jersey Harvard Scholar at the Department of Politics and International Studies at Emmanuel College, Cambridge, he won a Gates Cambridge Scholarship to continue his research there as part of a doctorate program. He received a Ph.D. in history in 2019. During his time studying at Cambridge, Cervini researched gender and sexuality in ancient society.

== Career ==
After seven years researching the pre-Stonewall riots homophile movement, Cervini signed a book deal with Farrar, Straus, & Giroux in 2018. In the months leading up to the book release, Cervini started a podcast The Deviant’s World, and a Youtube and Instagram series, The Magic Closet, to share his research that did not make it into the book.

=== The Deviant's War ===
In June 2020, Cervini’s book, The Deviant's War: The Homosexual vs. The United States of America, was published and became a New York Times Bestseller—the first work of LGBTQ history to make the list in 27 years. The Deviant's War is the first full-length biography of Frank Kameny, a key figure in the gay liberation movement who is widely considered the “grandfather of the gay rights movement”.

Cervini examined the life of Kameny, who was a pioneer in early homophile movement for LGBTQ rights in the decades leading up to the 1969 Stonewall riots, and beyond. Gay Pride, unnamed until the 1970s, was argued in concept by Kameny to the U.S. Supreme Court in 1961. In the 1970s, Kameny scored multiple victories, one being the decision to strike homosexuality from the American Psychiatric Association’s manual of mental disorders. Charles Kaiser wrote of Kameny that he "may be responsible for more fundamental social change in the post-World War II world than any other American of his generation.”

New York magazine's "Approval Matrix" placed The Deviant's War in its quadrant for "brilliant" and "highbrow" and The Washington Post book review also called it "brilliant," as well as a "rich portrait of Kameny." Rich Juzwiak of The Attic called the book “painstakingly detailed” with "exhaustive" research.

The Deviant's War examines the experiences of LGBTQ people in Kameny's lifetime. Cervini’s research used declassified documents and thousands of personal documents, and tells Kameny’s story including the closeted gay subculture, coupled with the government fear that LGBTQ people were communists and security risks. According to Michael Henry Adams of The Guardian, LGBTQ people faced the same social disdain and institutionalized hatred “faced by blacks and Jews, buttressed by centuries of religious bigotry” but were more loathed. He also covers other key figures in early LGBTQ history including Jack Nichols, Barbara Gittings, Jim Fouratt, Randy Wicker, Marsha P. Johnson, and Sylvia Rivera. Cervini examined the intersections of the early LGBTQ rights movement, as well as the Black Freedom Movement, the New Left, lesbian activism, and transgender resistance.

== Awards and honors ==
Cervini was named to Logo30’s 2020 list of influential LGBTQ figures. The Deviant's War was named to the New York Times Editor’s Choice Recommended Books.

Year	Award	Category	Nominated work	Result	Ref.
2021	Queerties	Best Read	The Deviant's War	Won	Winners
2021	Pulitzer Prize for History	—	The Deviant's War	Nominated	
2021	Randy Shilts Award	Gay Nonfiction	The Deviant's War	Won	
