= List of Imagine Entertainment productions =

This is a list of films and television series produced by American independent production company Imagine Entertainment, currently located in Beverly Hills, California. The company was established in November 1985 by producer Brian Grazer and director Ron Howard. The feature-film division has participated in over sixty productions and is associated with Universal Pictures, which has distributed many of Imagine's productions, some with other studios. Its television division, Imagine Television Studios (formerly Imagine Television), has participated in at least twenty productions and has been frequently associated with 20th Century Fox Television.

== Theatrical films ==
=== 1980s ===
Year	Title	Distributor	Notes	References
1987	Like Father Like Son	TriStar Pictures	First film	
1988	Willow	Metro-Goldwyn-Mayer	With Lucasfilm	
1988	Vibes	Columbia Pictures		
1988	Clean and Sober	Warner Bros.		
1989	The 'Burbs	Universal Pictures		
1989	The Dream Team	Universal Pictures		
1989	Parenthood	Universal Pictures		

=== 1990s ===
Year	Title	Distributor	Notes	References
1990	Opportunity Knocks	Universal Pictures	With Brad Grey Productions and The Meledandri-Gordon Company	
1990	Cry-Baby	Universal Pictures		
1990	Kindergarten Cop	Universal Pictures		
1990	Problem Child	Universal Pictures	With Robert Simonds Productions	
1991	The Doors	Tri-Star Pictures	With Carolco Pictures	
1991	Closet Land	Universal Pictures		
1991	Backdraft	Universal Pictures	With Trilogy Entertainment Group	
1991	Problem Child 2	Universal Pictures	With Robert Simonds Productions	
1991	My Girl	Columbia Pictures		
1992	Far and Away	Universal Pictures		
1992	Housesitter	Universal Pictures		
1992	Boomerang	Paramount Pictures	With Eddie Murphy Productions	
1993	CB4	Universal Pictures	Uncredited	
1993	Cop and a Half	Universal Pictures		
1993	For Love or Money	Universal Pictures		
1994	My Girl 2	Columbia Pictures		
1994	Greedy	Universal Pictures		
1994	The Paper	Universal Pictures		
1994	The Cowboy Way	Universal Pictures		
1995	Apollo 13	Universal Pictures	Inducted into the National Film Registry in 2023	
1996	Sgt. Bilko	Universal Pictures		
1996	Fear	Universal Pictures		
1996	The Nutty Professor	Universal Pictures	With Eddie Murphy Productions	
1996	Ransom	Buena Vista Pictures	With Touchstone Pictures; uncredited	
1996	The Chamber	Universal Pictures	With Davis Entertainment	
1997	Liar Liar	Universal Pictures		
1997	Inventing the Abbotts	20th Century Fox		
1998	Mercury Rising	Universal Pictures		
1998	Psycho	Universal Pictures		
1999	EDtv	Universal Pictures		
1999	Life	Universal Pictures		
1999	Bowfinger	Universal Pictures		
1999	Beyond the Mat	Lions Gate Films		

=== 2000s ===
Year	Title	Distributor	Notes	References
2000	Nutty Professor II: The Klumps	Universal Pictures	With Eddie Murphy Productions	
2000	How the Grinch Stole Christmas	Universal Pictures	With Dr. Seuss Enterprises	
2001	A Beautiful Mind	Universal Pictures	With DreamWorks Pictures	
2002	Undercover Brother	Universal Pictures		
2002	Blue Crush	Universal Pictures		
2002	Stealing Harvard	Sony Pictures Releasing	With Columbia Pictures and Revolution Studios	
2002	8 Mile	Universal Pictures	With Mikona Productions GmbH & Co. KG	
2003	Intolerable Cruelty	Universal Pictures	With Mike Zoss Productions	
2003	The Missing	Sony Pictures Releasing	With Columbia Pictures and Revolution Studios	
2003	The Cat in the Hat	Universal Pictures	With DreamWorks Pictures and Dr. Seuss Enterprises	
2004	The Alamo	Buena Vista Pictures	With Touchstone Pictures	
2004	Friday Night Lights	Universal Pictures		
2005	Inside Deep Throat	Universal Pictures	With HBO Documentary Films and World of Wonder	
2005	Cinderella Man	Universal Pictures	With Miramax Films and Parkway Productions	
2005	Flightplan	Buena Vista Pictures	With Touchstone Pictures	
2005	Fun with Dick and Jane	Sony Pictures Releasing	With Columbia Pictures and JC 23 Entertainment	
2006	Curious George	Universal Pictures	With Universal Animation Studios; first animated film	
2006	Inside Man	Universal Pictures	With 40 Acres and a Mule Filmworks	
2006	The Da Vinci Code	Sony Pictures Releasing	With Columbia Pictures and Skylark Productions	
2007	American Gangster	Universal Pictures	With Relativity Media and Scott Free Productions	
2008	Changeling	Universal Pictures	With Relativity Media and Malpaso Productions	
2008	Frost/Nixon	Universal Pictures	With StudioCanal, Relativity Media and Working Title Films	
2009	Angels & Demons	Sony Pictures Releasing	With Columbia Pictures and Skylark Productions	

=== 2010s ===
Year	Title	Distributor	Notes	References
2010	Robin Hood	Universal Pictures	With Relativity Media and Scott Free Productions	
2011	The Dilemma	Universal Pictures	With Spyglass Entertainment and Wild West Picture Show Productions	
2011	Take Me Home Tonight	Relativity Media	With Rogue	
2011	Cowboys & Aliens	Universal Pictures	With DreamWorks Pictures, Reliance Entertainment, K/O Paper Products, Fairview Entertainment and Platinum Studios; international distribution by Paramount Pictures	
2011	Restless	Sony Pictures Classics	With Columbia Pictures	
2011	Tower Heist	Universal Pictures	With Relativity Media and Eddie Murphy Productions	
2011	J. Edgar	Warner Bros. Pictures	With Malpaso Productions and Wintergreen Productions	
2012	Katy Perry: Part of Me	Paramount Pictures	With AEG Live, EMI Music, Perry Productions, Pulse Films, Magical Elves Productions, Splinter Films, MTV Films and Insurge Pictures	
2013	Rush	Universal Pictures	Independently financed; with Exclusive Media, Cross Creek Pictures, Working Title Films and Revolution Films	
2013	Made in America	Phase 4 Films	With Participant Media, RadicalMedia and Jay-Z	
2014	Get On Up	Universal Pictures	With Jagged Films and Wyolah Films	
2014	The Good Lie	Warner Bros. Pictures	With Alcon Entertainment, Reliance Entertainment and Black Label Media	
2015	In the Heart of the Sea	Warner Bros. Pictures	With Village Roadshow Pictures, RatPac-Dune Entertainment, COTT Productions, Enelmar Productions A.I.E., Roth Films, Spring Creek Pictures and Kia Jam	
2015	Prophet's Prey	Showtime	With Artemis Rising Foundation and Disarming Films	
2015	Love the Coopers	CBS Films (via Lionsgate)	With Groundswell Productions	
2016	Pelé: Birth of a Legend	IFC Films	With Seine Pictures	
2016	Inferno	Sony Pictures Releasing	With Columbia Pictures, LStar Capital, LSG Productions and Mid Atlantic Films	
2016	The Beatles: Eight Days a Week – The Touring Years	Hulu	With Apple Corps and White Horse Pictures	
2017	Lowriders	Universal Pictures	With BH Tilt and Telemundo	
2017	The Dark Tower	Sony Pictures Releasing	With Columbia Pictures, Weed Road Pictures and MRC	
2017	American Made	Universal Pictures	With Cross Creek Pictures, Hercules Film Fund, Quadrant Pictures and Vendian Entertainment	
2018	The Spy Who Dumped Me	Lionsgate	With Bron Studios	
2019	Pavarotti	CBS Films	With PolyGram Entertainment, Decca Records and White Horse Pictures	
2019	Once Were Brothers: Robbie Robertson and the Band	Magnolia Pictures	Under Imagine Documentaries; with Bell Media Studios and White Pine Pictures	

=== 2020s ===
Year	Title	Distributor	Notes	References
2020	Rebuilding Paradise	National Geographic Documentary Films	Under Imagine Documentaries	
2020	Breakthrough: Virus Fighters	National Geographic Documentary Films	Under Imagine Documentaries; with National Geographic Studios, Lincoln Square Productions, DDCD & Partners, Inc., Asylum Entertainment and General Electric	
2020	D. Wade: Life Unexpected	ESPN Films	Under Imagine Documentaries	
2021	Julia	Sony Pictures Classics	Under Imagine Documentaries; with CNN Films and Storyville Films	
2021	Paper & Glue	Abromarama and MSNBC Films	Under Imagine Documentaries; with Impact Partners, TIME Studios and Shark Island Productions	
2022	Thirteen Lives	United Artists Releasing and Amazon Studios	With Metro-Goldwyn-Mayer, Bron Creative, Magnolia Mae Films and Storyteller Productions	
2023	Carlos	Sony Pictures Classics	Under Imagine Documentaries; with Sony Music Entertainment	
2025	Eden	Vertical	With AGC Studios, Library Pictures International and Medan Productions	
2025	After the Hunt	Amazon MGM Studios	With Metro-Goldwyn-Mayer, Frenesy Film Company and Potboiler; international theatrical distribution by Sony Pictures Releasing International	
2026	Whalefall	20th Century Studios	With Jurassic Party Productions	
2026	How to Rob a Bank	Amazon MGM Studios	With Metro-Goldwyn-Mayer and 87North Productions; international theatrical distribution by Sony Pictures Releasing International	

=== Future ===
Year	Title	Distributor	Notes	References
2027	Spaceballs: The New One	Amazon MGM Studios	With Metro-Goldwyn-Mayer and Brooksfilms	
2027	Snoop	Universal Pictures	With Death Row Pictures	
2027	Alone at Dawn	Amazon MGM Studios	With Metro-Goldwyn-Mayer, The Hideaway Entertainment and Thruline Entertainment	
TBA	Dangerously Funny	TBA	With Good Walk Entertainment	
TBA	Fear	Universal Pictures		
TBA	The Last Letter	Amazon MGM Studios	With Full Measures	
TBA	Love Advice from the Great Duke of Hell	TBA	With Wattpad Webtoon Studios	
TBA	Muttnik	Paramount Pictures	With Paramount Animation	
TBA	Pyongyang Home Video	TBA	With Desert Bloom Pictures	
TBA	Rager	Lionsgate		
TBA	Rainbow Serpent	Paramount Pictures	With Paramount Animation	
TBA	Scar Tissue	Universal Pictures		
TBA	Untitled 24 film	20th Century Studios		
TBA	Untitled Friday Night Lights film	Universal Pictures		
TBA	Zero	Warner Bros. Pictures	With Warner Bros. Pictures Animation	

== Direct-to-video films ==
=== 2000s ===
Year	Title	Distributor	Notes	References
2009	Curious George 2: Follow That Monkey!	Universal Studios Home Entertainment	With Universal Animation Studios	

=== 2010s ===
Year	Title	Distributor	Notes	References
2015	Curious George 3: Back to the Jungle	Universal Pictures Home Entertainment	With Universal 1440 Entertainment and Universal Animation Studios	
2016	Kindergarten Cop 2	Universal Pictures Home Entertainment	With Universal 1440 Entertainment and Where's Arnold Productions	
2017	Cop and a Half: New Recruit	Universal Pictures Home Entertainment	With Universal 1440 Entertainment, Everywhere Studios and 50 Degrees North Productions	
2019	Backdraft 2	Universal Pictures Home Entertainment	With Universal 1440 Entertainment, Rafaella Productions, Nexus Factory, uMedia and Title Media	
2019	Curious George: Royal Monkey	Universal Pictures Home Entertainment	With Universal 1440 Entertainment and Universal Animation Studios	
2019	Inside Man: Most Wanted	Universal Pictures Home Entertainment	With Universal 1440 Entertainment	
2019	Undercover Brother 2	Universal Pictures Home Entertainment	With Universal 1440 Entertainment and Hal Lieberman Company	

== Direct-to-streaming films ==
=== 2010s ===
Year	Title	Distributor	Notes	References
2019	Peanuts in Space: Secrets of Apollo 10	Apple TV	Under Imagine Documentaries; with DHX Media and Tremolo Productions	

=== 2020s ===
Year	Title	Distributor	Notes	References
2020	Dads	Apple TV+	Under Imagine Documentaries; with Dove Men + Care and Nine Muses Entertainment	
2020	Curious George: Go West Go Wild	Peacock	With Universal 1440 Entertainment and Universal Animation Studios	
2020	Hillbilly Elegy	Netflix		
2020	John Bronco	Hulu	With Gifted Youth	
2021	The Day Sports Stood Still	HBO Max	Under Imagine Documentaries; with HBO Documentary Films, Waffle Iron Entertainment, Hill District Media and Ohh Dip!!! Productions	
2021	Who Are You, Charlie Brown?	Apple TV+	Under Imagine Documentaries; with WildBrain Studios, Peanuts Worldwide and Schulz Studio	
2021	John Bronco Rides Again	The Roku Channel	With Gifted Youth	
2021	Curious George: Cape Ahoy	Peacock	With Universal 1440 Entertainment and Universal Animation Studios	
2021	Tick, Tick... Boom!	Netflix	With 5000 Broadway Productions	
2021	Coded: The Hidden Love of J.C. Leyendecker	Paramount+	Under Imagine Documentaries; with MTV Documentary Films and Delirio Films; short documentary	
2022	Downfall: The Case Against Boeing	Netflix	Under Imagine Documentaries; with Moxie Films	
2022	Lucy and Desi	Amazon Prime Video	Under Imagine Documentaries; with Amazon Studios, White Horse Pictures, Paper Kite Productions and Diamond Docs	
2022	We Feed People	Disney+	Under Imagine Documentaries; with National Geographic Documentary Films	
2022	Leave No Trace	Hulu	Under Imagine Documentaries; with ABC News Studios and Vermilion Films	
2022	Thirteen Lives	Amazon Prime Video	With Metro-Goldwyn-Mayer, Bron and Amazon Studios	
2022	Wedding Season	Netflix	With Jax Media and Samosa Stories	
2022	Louis Armstrong's Black & Blues	Apple TV+	Under Imagine Documentaries; with Polygram Entertainment	
2022	The Volcano: Rescue from Whakaari	Netflix	Under Imagine Documentaries; with Appian Way and Moxie Films	
2023	Bono & The Edge: A Sort of Homecoming, with Dave Letterman	Disney+	Under Imagine Documentaries; with Tremolo Productions and Worldwide Pants Productions	
2023	Judy Blume Forever	Amazon Prime Video	Under Imagine Documentaries; with Amazon Studios	
2023	The Beanie Bubble	Apple TV+	With Apple Studios	
2023	Candy Cane Lane	Amazon Prime Video	With Amazon MGM Studios, Bubble Pictures and Big Indie Pictures	
2024	Frida	Amazon Prime Video	Under Imagine Documentaries; with Amazon MGM Studios, Time Studios and Storyville Films	
2024	Stormy	Peacock	Under Imagine Documentaries; with Apatow Productions and Carr Lot Productions	
2024	Jim Henson Idea Man	Disney+	Under Imagine Documentaries; with The Jim Henson Company, Disney Original Documentary, Diamond Docs and Fifth Season	
2024	Music by John Williams	Disney+	Under Imagine Documentaries; with Lucasfilm Ltd., Amblin Documentaries and Nedland Media	
2024	The Lost Children	Netflix	Under Imagine Documentaries; with Grain Media, Caracol Televisión, Teletigre and One Day's Walk	
2025	Pets	Disney+	Under Imagine Documentaries; with Nine Muses Entertainment	
2025	Stewart 27	ESPN+	Under Imagine Documentaries; with Andscape, Rockstar Energy Drink, PepsiCo Content Studio	
2025	Barbara Walters: Tell Me Everything	Hulu	Under Imagine Documentaries, with ABC News Studios and Latchkey Films	
2026	Marty, Life Is Short	Netflix	Under Imagine Documentaries, with Kasdan Pictures	
2026	Freefall: A Reckoning for Boeing	Netflix	Under Imagine Documentaries, with Moxie Films	
2026	The Mosquito Bowl	Netflix	with Film 44	

=== Future ===
Year	Title	Distributor	Notes	References
2026	The Shrinking of Treehorn	Netflix	With Paramount Pictures and Paramount Animation	

== Television films ==
=== 2020s ===
Year	Title	Distributor	Notes	References
2023	Personality Crisis: One Night Only	Showtime	Under Imagine Documentaries; with Showtime Documentary Films and Sikelia Productions	
2023	The Slumber Party	Disney Channel	Under Imagine Kids+Family; with Jax Media	
2026	Summer of '94	Fox	Under Imagine Documentaries; with Fox Sports, Delirio Films, Cookie Jar & A Dream Studios and Copper Pot Pictures	

== Television series ==
=== 1980s ===
Year(s)	Title	Network/Channel	Notes	References
1986–87	Gung Ho	ABC	First television series; with Four Way Productions and Paramount Television	
1987–88	Ohara	ABC	With M'ass Production and Warner Bros. Television	
1987	Take Five	CBS	With Empire City Presentations and Tri-Star Television	
1989	Knight & Daye	NBC		

=== 1990s ===
Year(s)	Title	Network/Channel	Notes	References
1990–91	Parenthood	NBC	With Universal Television	
1990–91	My Talk Show	Syndication	With Second City Entertainment and MCA TV	
1997–98	Hiller and Diller	ABC	With Touchstone Television	
1998	From the Earth to the Moon	HBO	With Clavius Base Productions	
1998–2000	Sports Night	ABC	With Touchstone Television	
1998–2002	Felicity	The WB	With Touchstone Television	
1999–2001	The PJs	FOX/The WB	With The Murphy Company, Will Vinton Studios, Touchstone Television (seasons 1–2) and Warner Bros. Television (season 3)	

=== 2000s ===
Year(s)	Title	Network/Channel	Notes	References
2000	Wonderland	ABC/The 101 Network	With Touchstone Television	
2000	Rat Bastard	UPN	Pilot; with Epoch Ink	
2001	The Beast	ABC	With Touchstone Television	
2001–10	24	FOX	With Real Time Productions, Teakwood Lane Productions, and 20th Century Fox Television	
2003	Miss Match	NBC	With Darren Star Productions and 20th Century Fox Television	
2003–06; 2013–19	Arrested Development	FOX/Netflix	With The Hurwitz Company and 20th Century Fox Television	
2004	The Big House	ABC	With 20th Century Fox Television	
2004–05	Quintuplets	FOX	With Mark Reisman Productions and 20th Century Fox Television	
2005	The Inside	FOX	With Reamworks and 20th Century Fox Television	
2006	Saved	TNT	With Sarabande Productions and Fox 21	
2006–15; 2021–22	Curious George	PBS Kids/Family Jr./Peacock	Credited as Imagine Entertainment; seasons 1–9, 12 and 14–15; with WGBH Boston (seasons 1–9 and 12), Universal 1440 Entertainment (seasons 12, 14–15) and Universal Animation Studios	
2006	Treasure Hunters	NBC	With Magical Elves, Inc., Madison Road Entertainment and NBCUniversal Television Studio	
2006–08	Shark	CBS	With Deforestation Services and 20th Century Fox Television	
2006–11	Friday Night Lights	NBC	With Film 44 and Universal Television	
2008	24: Redemption	FOX	With Teakwood Lane Productions and 20th Century Fox Television	
2009–11	Lie to Me	FOX	With Pagoda Pictures, Samuel Baum Productions, MiddKid Productions, and 20th Century Fox Television	

=== 2010s ===
Year(s)	Title	Network/Channel	Notes	References
2010–15	Parenthood	NBC	With True Jack Productions, Open 4 Business Productions and Universal Television	
2011	Friends with Benefits	NBC	With Big Kid Pictures, Pickle Films, and 20th Century Fox Television	
2011	The Playboy Club	NBC	With Alta Loma Entertainment, Storyland Entertainment, and 20th Century Fox Television	
2012	The 84th Academy Awards	ABC	With The Academy of Motion Picture Arts and Sciences	
2012	The Great Escape	TNT	With Profiles Television Productions, The Hochberg Ebersol Company, and Fox Television Studios	
2013	How to Live with Your Parents (For the Rest of Your Life)	ABC	With Hot Lava Girl Productions and 20th Century Fox Television	
2014	Those Who Kill	A&E/Lifetime Movie Network	With One Two One Three Pictures, Miso Film, and Fox 21	
2014	24: Live Another Day	FOX	With Teakwood Lane Productions and 20th Century Fox Television	
2014	Gang Related	FOX	With Chris Morgan Productions, Skeeter Rosenbaum Productions, and 20th Century Fox Television	
2015–20	Empire	FOX	With Lee Daniels Entertainment, Danny Strong Productions, Little Chicken Inc., and 20th Century Fox Television	
2015	The Bastard Executioner	FX	With Sutter Ink, FX Productions, and Fox 21 Television Studios	
2015–present	Breakthrough	National Geographic Channel		
2016–18	Mars	National Geographic Channel	With RadicalMedia	
2017	24: Legacy	FOX	With Coto/Katz Productions, Teakwood Lane Productions and 20th Century Fox Television	
2017	Shots Fired	FOX	With Undisputed Cinema and 20th Century Fox Television	
2017–2024	Genius	National Geographic Channel	With Paperboy Productions, OddLot Entertainment, EUE/Sokolow and 20th Television	
2019–21	Why Women Kill	CBS All Access/Paramount+	With Black Lamb, Acme Productions, Cherry Productions and CBS Studios	
2019–23	Wu-Tang: An American Saga	Hulu	With RZA Productions, Minute Drill Productions and 20th Television (seasons 2–3)	

=== 2020s ===
Year(s)	Title	Network/Channel	Notes	References
2020	68 Whiskey	Paramount Network	With yes Studio, Little City and CBS Television Studios	
2020	Filthy Rich	FOX	With Wyolah Films and Fox Entertainment	
2020–21	The Astronauts	Nickelodeon	Under Imagine Kids+Family; with UnMovies and Nickelodeon Productions	
2020	On Pointe	Disney+	Under Imagine Documentaries; with Downtown Community Television Center	
2021	We Are: The Brooklyn Saints	Netflix	Under Imagine Documentaries; with Disarming Films	
2021	Crime Scene: The Vanishing at the Cecil Hotel	Netflix	Under Imagine Documentaries; with RadicalMedia and Third Eye Motion Picture Company	
2021	Supervillain: The Making of Tekashi 6ix9ine	Showtime	Under Imagine Documentaries; with Rolling Stone and Lightbox	
2021	Gossip	Showtime	Under Imagine Documentaries; with Showtime Documentary Films	
2021	The Lost Symbol	Peacock	With Dworkin/Beattie, Universal Television and CBS Studios	
2021	Crime Scene: The Times Square Killer	Netflix	Under Imagine Documentaries; with RadicalMedia and Third Eye Motion Picture Company	
2021–23	Swagger	Apple TV+	With Undisputed Cinema, Thirty Five Ventures and CBS Studios	
2021–present	The Ms. Pat Show	BET+	With Lee Daniels Entertainment, DAE Light Media and BET Original Productions	
2022	Under the Banner of Heaven	FX on Hulu	Credited as Imagine Television; with Hungry Jackal Productions, Aggregate Films and FXP	
2022	Web of Make Believe: Death, Lies and the Internet	Netflix	Under Imagine Documentaries; with Luminant Media	
2022–25	Light & Magic	Disney+	Under Imagine Documentaries; with Lucasfilm and Kasdan Pictures (season 1)	
2022	Crime Scene: The Texas Killing Fields	Netflix	Under Imagine Documentaries; with RadicalMedia and Third Eye Motion Picture Company	
2022–25	The Tiny Chef Show	Nickelodeon	Under Imagine Kids+Family; with Factory (season 1), ShadowMachine (season 2), Dunshire Productions, Tiny Chef Productions and Nickelodeon Animation Studio	
2023	Murf the Surf	MGM+	With This Machine Filmworks	
2023–24	Bossy Bear	Nickelodeon	Under Imagine Kids+Family; with Renegade Animation and Nickelodeon Animation Studio	
2023	The Super Models	Apple TV+	Under Imagine Documentaries; with One Story Up	
2023	Taiwan Crime Stories	Disney+	With CalFilms Asia and Sixty Percent Productions	
2024	Choir	Disney+	Under Imagine Documentaries; with Blumhouse Television and Maniac Productions	
2024	The Truth About Jim	Max	Under Imagine Documentaries; with Investigation Discovery and Freak Magnet	
2024	The Dynasty: New England Patriots	Apple TV+	Under Imagine Documentaries	
2024	I Am Not a Monster: The Lois Riess Murders	HBO	Under Imagine Documentaries; with HBO Documentary Films and Carr Lot Productions	
2024	Churchill at War	Netflix	Under Imagine Documentaries	
2025	Faces the Music	Hulu	Under Imagine Documentaries; with Mazu films, Sephora and Digitas Pictures	
2025	Harlem Ice	Disney+	Under Imagine Documentaries	
2025	David Blaine: Do Not Attempt	National Geographic Channel	Under Imagine Documentaries	
2025	Fight for Glory: 2024 World Series	Apple TV+	Under Imagine Documentaries; with This Machine Filmworks, Cap 2 Productions and MLB	
2025	Earnhardt	Amazon Prime Video	Under Imagine Documentaries; with NASCAR Studios, Everyone Else and Dirty Mo Media	
2025	Gringo Hunters	Netflix	With The Washington Post, Woo Films and Redrum	
2026–present	The 'Burbs	Peacock	Credited as Imagine Entertainment; with Fuzzy Door Productions, Out of the Blue Productions, and Universal Content Productions	

=== Future ===
Year(s)	Title	Network/Channel	Notes	References
2027	Wild Things	Apple TV	With Apple Studios	
TBA	Fear	Peacock	With Universal Television	
TBA	Untitled musical comedy	Amazon Prime Video	With Amazon MGM Studios	
