= Edward Bell =

Edward Bell may refer to:

== Sportspeople ==
- Edward Bell (footballer) (1888–1918), British footballer
- Eddie Bell (halfback) (1931–2009), American football player
- Eddie Bell (wide receiver) (born 1946), former American football wide receiver
- Ed Bell (American football) (1921–1990), American football player
- Ted Bell (footballer) (1883–?), English footballer

== Others ==
- Ed Bell (musician) (1905–1960, 1965 or 1966), American Piedmont blues and country blues singer, guitarist and songwriter
- Edward Bell (singer/songwriter) (born 1987), English singer-songwriter
- Edward Bell (artist), British artist
- Edward William Derrington Bell (1824–1879), recipient of the Victoria Cross
- Ennio Balbo (1922–1989), Italian actor sometimes credited as Edward Bell
- Edward Bell (American actor) (born 1935), husband of Esther Williams (until her death)
- Edward Harold Bell (1939–2019), American sex offender and murderer
- Edward Price Bell (1869–1943), American journalist and Nobel Peace Prize nominee
- Edward Ingress Bell (1837–1914), English architect
- Edward Wells Bell (c. 1789–1870), British Army officer
- Eddie Bell (racing driver) in 2014 V8SuperTourer season

== See also ==
- Robert Edward Bell (1918–1992), Canadian physicist
