= Texas Killing Fields =

Location in Texas, scene of 34 murders

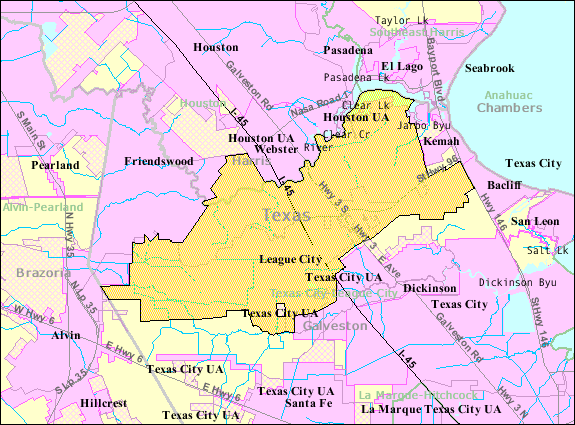
- Location of League City
- Date: 1971–2006
- Location: League City, Galveston County, Texas, US; 29°29′59″N 95°5′13″W
- Motive: Undetermined (multiple cases). Possible sexual assault in several instances.
- Deaths: 34

The Texas Killing Fields is a title used to denote the area surrounding the Interstate 45 (I-45) corridor southeast of Houston, where since the early 1970s, 34 bodies have been found, and specifically to a 25-acre (10 ha) patch of land in League City, Texas, United States, where four women were found between 1983 and 1991. The bodies along the corridor were mainly of girls or young women. Furthermore, many additional young girls have disappeared from this area who are still missing. Most of the victims were aged between 12 and 25 years. Some shared similar physical features, such as similar hairstyles.

Despite efforts by the League City Police Department, along with the assistance of the FBI, very few of these murders have been solved. The area has been described as "a perfect place [for] killing somebody and getting away with it". After visiting some of the sites of recovered bodies in League City, Ami Canaan Mann, director of the film Texas Killing Fields, commented: "You could actually see the refineries that are in the south end of League City. You could see I-45. But if you yelled, no one would necessarily hear you. And if you ran, there wouldn't necessarily be anywhere to go." A task force composed of local law enforcement officials and FBI agents, called Operation HALT (Homicide/Abduction Liaison Team), has been formed to investigate the incidents.

== Victims ==
Confirmed or suspected victims, listed chronologically :

- Colette Anise Wilson, 13, disappeared from the Alvin Bus Stop on County Road 99 and State Highway 6 in Alvin, Texas, after she was dropped off by her band director on June 17, 1971. Her body was found five months later on November 26, 1971, near the Addicks Reservoir, just 35 yards (32 m) from the location where the body of Gloria Gonzales was discovered four months later.
- Brenda Kaye Jones, 14, was last seen alive in Galveston, Texas on July 1, 1971. She was walking to Galveston hospital, close to I-45 on her way to visit her aunt. Her body was found on July 2, 1971, floating in nearby Galveston Bay near Pelican Island, close to the Seawolf Parkway and near I-45.

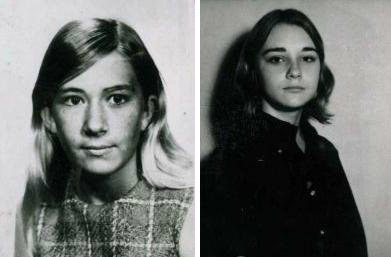
Rhonda Johnson (left) and Sharon Shaw

- Rhonda Renee Johnson, 14, and Sharon Lynn Shaw, 13, disappeared in Harris County, Texas, on the afternoon of August 4, 1971. Both were last seen walking along Seawall Boulevard in Galveston near a local beach. On January 3, 1972, two boys fishing in Clear Lake discovered a human skull floating in the water, which they had initially believed to be a sports ball. Six weeks later, searchers discovered the rest of the body, along with the body of another girl, in a marsh near the lake. According to a coroner's inquest filed on February 17, 1972, the skull found in the lake was determined via dental records to have belonged to Shaw. Additionally, a crucifix found wrapped around the jawbone of the skull was identified by Shaw's mother to have belonged to her daughter. The other body found in the marsh was positively identified as Johnson.
- Gloria Ann Gonzales, 19, was last seen on October 28, 1971, near her apartment on Jacquelyn Street in Houston, Texas. Her skeletal remains were found near Addicks Reservoir in the same area as Colette Wilson on November 23, 1971.
- Allison Anne Craven, 12, was reported missing by her mother on November 9, 1971, when she returned to their apartment in Houston, Texas near I-45 after completing shopping errands for one hour. Three months later police found Craven's partial remains in a nearby field, two hands along with bones from an arm and some teeth. On February 25, 1972, the rest of her skeleton was found in a Pearland, Texas field, also near I-45 and 10 miles (16 km) from where she was last seen.
- Debbie Catherine Ackerman and Maria Talbot Johnson, both 15, were last seen attempting to hitchhike to Houston, Texas near an island ice cream shop in Galveston, Texas on November 15, 1971. Witnesses reported seeing a man in a white van stopping by the curb side and picking up the girls after agreeing to drive them to Houston. Their bodies were found bound and partially nude in Turner's Bayou on November 17, 1971, near Texas City.
- Kimberly Raye Pitchford, 16, was last seen at Dobie High School in Houston, Texas while she was there for a driving test on January 3, 1973. Her body was found by two teenaged boys two days later in a ditch in Angleton, Texas around noon on County Road 65 in Brazoria County on January 5, 1973.
- Brooks Bracewell, 12, and Georgia Caroline Geer, 14, were both last seen at the UtoteM convenience store off I-45 on September 6, 1974. At the time of their disappearance, police insisted that Bracewell and Geer were runaways, only beginning to investigate foul play in 1981. In 1976, partial skeletal remains belonging to Bracewell were found by police in a culvert in Alvin, Texas, nearby the pair's last known location, but were not connected to Bracewell and Geer at the time, and were only identified as Bracewell after a new detective took over the case in 1981. The ditch where they were originally found was reexamined on April 3, 1981, and more remains were found as well as the fragments of a gold sweater and plaid pants.
- Suzanne "Suzie" Bowers, 12, was last seen walking along a route between her grandmother's house at the 4000 block of Avenue S 1/2, about 1 mile to her own home at the 3100 block of Avenue P at around 10:45 a.m. On May 21, 1977, in Galveston, Texas. The seventh grader was going home to get her swimsuit to go to the beach. Her skeletal remains were found two years later in Alta Loma, Texas on March 25, 1979.
- Tina Gail Clouse, 17, and Harold Dean Clouse Jr., 21, were found on January 12, 1981, in northern Harris County in a boggy, wooded area just north of the Houston city limits. A civilian's dog let to wander into the woods returned to its owner with a decomposing human arm. Search parties prompted by the dog's discovery subsequently found the heavily decomposed bodies of the Clouse couple near Wallisville Road. Despite significant decomposition, it was determined that both were victims of homicide. Tina had been strangled, and Harold had been bound and gagged before being beaten to death. In 2021, forensic genealogists positively identified Dean and Tina, and in 2022, their daughter Holly Marie was located alive in Oklahoma.
- Michelle Angela Garvey, 15, went missing from New London, Connecticut, presumably after running away from home, on June 1, 1982, at the age of 14. Garvey's body was found on July 1, 1982, in Baytown, Texas, one month after she went missing. The cause of death of the victim was determined to be strangulation. There was evidence that Garvey had been sexually assaulted. Her body was found wearing brown clothing, including a long-sleeved, button-down shirt with a distinct horse embroidery on the breast pocket. The body was disposed of in a field after she died, possibly hours after her murder. She was buried near two other unidentified murder victims found in 1981 who were identified in 2021 as Dean and Tina Clouse. Garvey was identified in January 2014, through the efforts of the National Center for Missing and Exploited Children and the Harris County Police Department, who had contacted her family and obtained samples of their DNA for testing in August 2013.
- Susan Lee Eads, 20, was a cocktail waitress who left her family home in Harris County at around 4:30 p.m. on August 30, 1983, to her workplace. The following day, a motorist discovered her body a few miles from her home. Found naked, she had bruises on her back and face. Susan had been strangled to death with the bodysuit she was wearing, which had been used as a tourniquet. Her car was found parked adjacent to the vacant lot where she was found. An autopsy determined that she had been sexually assaulted. Eads was last seen at a local club with a white man wearing a cowboy hat. Her mother received phone calls from an unidentified man who claimed to have photos of her daughter. He referred to himself as "Bill", and said that he lived in Houston, Texas. A DNA profile extracted from Eads' body was matched to Arthur Raymond Davis Jr., a Vietnam War veteran and a boat captain. He died on January 16, 1984, after a single-vehicle accident.
- Heide Marie Villarreal-Fye, 25, was a cocktail waitress last seen on October 10, 1983, at a convenience store located off of West Main Street and Hobbs in League City, Texas. On April 4, 1984, Villarreal-Fye's remains were discovered after a dog brought her skull to a nearby house in Calder Field on the 3000 block of Calder Road near League City, Texas.

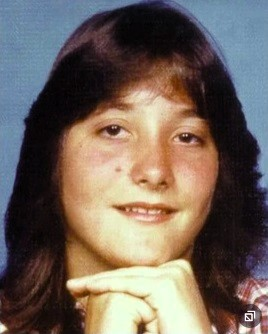
Sondra Ramber

- Sondra Kay Ramber, 14, was last seen at her family's home in Santa Fe, Texas on October 26, 1983. She was determined to be missing due to the fact that the front door was left open, food was in the oven, and her purse and coat were still in the house. She was initially believed to have gone to the store for a moment, but she never returned.
- Laura Lynn Miller, 16, a sophomore at Clear Creek Highschool in League City, Texas. She had just moved to League City, Texas and was musically gifted. She had suffered from debilitating seizures that affected her career in choir. She was last seen on September 10, 1984, at the same convenience store Villarreal-Fye was last seen at a year earlier in League City, Texas, using a payphone to call her boyfriend. It took police 17 months but her remains were found on February 2, 1986, 60 ft away from where police had found Villarreal-Fye the year before. She was found in a remote wooded field off Calder Road in League City, Texas.
- Ellen Rae Simpson Beason, 29, was last seen with friends sometime in July, 1984, at the Texas Moon Club in League City, Texas, where she met local construction worker Clyde Hedrick. Later that evening, she told her friends that she and Hedrick had made plans to go swimming. Her decomposed remains were discovered underneath a sofa in a wooded area beside Old Causeway Road in Galveston County on July 29th, 1985. The medical examiner was unable to determine the cause of death at that time, but upon the exhumation of her remains in 2012, it was ruled that she had suffered several severe skull fractures. Hedrick was convicted of involuntary manslaughter in connection with Beason's death and served eight years in prison. He died in 2026.
- Michelle Doherty Thomas, 17, was last seen leaving her familial residence in Santa Fe, Texas, on October 5, 1985, after having returned from work at a Galveston, Texas gas station. She left to meet with friends at a nearby nightclub located on Galveston Island later that evening. Acquaintances claimed they had stopped at a convenience store on the way to the nightclub, and Michelle had gotten into a vehicle with two men. She has not been seen since. Authorities believe that she may have been abducted and murdered.
- Audrey Lee Cook, 30, was last heard from in late December 1985. Cook's remains were found in a field in the 3000 block of Calder Road, on the same day that the body of Laura Miller was located nearby. The victims' bodies were not buried but rather hidden from view. Both were left in a supine position near a tree. Cook had a small calibre gunshot wound to the back, severing her spine, and she had suffered additional injuries to several ribs. She was identified in April 2019 along with Donna Prudhomme by Family Tree DNA using genetic genealogy.
- Shelley Kathleen Sikes, 19, was last seen leaving her job as a waitress at Gaido's Seafood Restaurant on the beachfront in Galveston, Texas, just prior to 12:00 a.m. on May 24, 1986. Her car was found the next day, stuck in mud, blood-stained, and abandoned on the side of an I-45 access road, south of the Galveston causeway. The driver's side window had been broken, and bloodstains were discovered on the door and on the driver's seat. Sikes' body has never been found, but John Robert King and Gerald Peter Zwarst have been charged and convicted of her murder.
- Suzanne Rene Richerson, 22, was employed as a night clerk at Casa Del Mar Condominiums on Seawall Boulevard in Galveston, Texas. She was last seen at work at 6:00 a.m. on October 7, 1988, by resort security guards, and shortly afterward another employee who was sleeping in the room above Richerson's office heard a loud female scream. The witness claimed to have then heard a car door slam shut accompanied by another scream and the sound of a car speeding away from the parking lot. A guest arrived at Richerson's office to check out at around 6:30 a.m. and discovered the desk abandoned.
- Donna Marie Prudhomme, 34, was last seen in July 1991 in Nassau Bay, Texas. On September 8, 1991, a local resident came across her badly decomposed body in a field beside Calder Road. A medical examination concluded that she had died at least six weeks prior, yet a cause of death could not be determined. She was identified in April 2019 along with Audrey Cook by Family Tree DNA with the use of genetic genealogy.
- Lynette Bibbs, 14, and Tamara Fisher, 15 disappeared on February 1, 1996, after visiting a Houston, Texas club for teenagers. A 22-year-old male later claimed to have dropped the friends off at a motel near the city center on Old Spanish Trail. The bodies of the two girls were found dumped by a rural road two days later on February 3, 1996, in Cleveland, Texas.
- Krystal Jean Baker, 13, was last seen near I-45 on March 5, 1996, in Texas City leaving her grandmother's home for a convenience store to use the phone after an argument. Krystal was last seen using a phone at a local convenience store to ask her friend if she could stay with her. Two hours later, her body was found. She had been raped, strangled, and dumped over the I-10 bridge above the Trinity River. Baker's great aunt was Marilyn Monroe. Kevin Edison Smith was convicted of capital murder in her death in 2012 and sentenced to life in prison. In 2019, Governor Greg Abbott signed into law the Krystal Jean Baker Act, which permits the collection of DNA from individuals arrested for certain felonies, prior to conviction.
- Laura Smither, 12, was last seen in Friendswood, Texas jogging down her home street on April 3, 1997, after telling her mother she was going on a 20-minute run. Seventeen days later, on April 20, 1997, her body was found in a retention pond in Pasadena, Texas. In 1998, her parents established the Laura Recovery Center, a non-profit organization that aids the search for and recovery of kidnapping victims. William Lewis Reece was convicted of the murders of Laura Smither, Kelli Cox and Jessica Cain in June 2022.
- Kelli Ann Cox, 20, was last seen July 15, 1997, at a Connoco gas station and convenience store in Denton, Texas, after locking herself out of her car and making a call to her boyfriend for help using the station's outdoor payphone. Over eighteen years later on March 18, 2016, Kelli's remains were discovered after suspected serial killer William Lewis Reece directed investigators to search an area in Brazoria County, Texas, where her remains were found. Reece confessed to and was convicted of the murders of Laura Smither, Kelli Cox, and Jessica Cain in June 2022.
- Jessica Lee Cain, 17, was last seen at the Bennigan's restaurant near Baybrook Mall in Clear Lake, Texas dining with friends at around 1:30 a.m. She was reported missing on August 17, 1997, when her father found her truck abandoned along I-45. On March 18, 2016, Jessica's remains were finally found in a field off of East Orem Road, next to Hobby Airport. Suspected serial killer, William Lewis Reece, directed investigators to search the area where her remains were found. Reece was convicted of the murders of Smither, Cox and Cain in June 2022.
- Tot Tran Harriman, 57, was visiting relatives in Texas and had mapped out a route between League City and Corpus Christi, Texas and planned to drive along SH 35. She departed at approximately 5:00 a.m. on July 12, 2001, from her son's residence near League City. Tot was last seen driving her 1995 Lincoln Continental along Highway 35.
- Sara Ann Lewis Trusty, 23, was last seen in the evening in Algoa, Texas near her church riding her bicycle at around 11 p.m. on July 12, 2002. Her body was discovered on July 28, 2002, in a dike in Texas City in a nearby reservoir by fishermen.
- Terressa Lynn Vanegas, 16, was last seen in Dickinson, Texas walking near the Green Caye Subdivision on October 31, 2006. Three days later, her body was found strangled, raped, and with her hair cut off in a field across from Dickinson High School.

== Suspects ==
=== Michael Lloyd Self ===
In 1972, a gas station operator and convicted sex offender from Galveston, Michael Lloyd Self, became a suspect in the murders of Rhonda Johnson and Sharon Shaw. After hours of interrogation, Self confessed to the murders. He was taken to the district prison, later aiding with locating the bodies. In the following months he retracted his confession. Self claimed that he had been tortured into confessing, with the interrogators suffocating him with a plastic bag, burning him with cigarette butts and a radiator, and the police chief, Don Morris, assaulting him. Nevertheless, on September 18, 1974, Self was convicted of killing Shaw and received a life imprisonment term, despite the fact that his confessions showed great discrepancies concerning the victims' clothing, the date of the murders, the locations of the bodies, how they were killed, and various other details.

Three years later in 1976, Don Morris and his deputy, Tommy Deal, were arrested and convicted of various crimes, including torture and other misconduct against detainees. Morris was sentenced to 55 years, and Deal to 30. After this, Self regularly applied for an appeal, but was rejected every time. Michael Self died on December 21, 2000, still in custody. It was only after his death that a number of police officials, including the former Harris County District Attorney, stated their belief that Self was wrongly convicted.

=== Edward Harold Bell ===
An investigation by the League City police and the FBI in the 1970s identified another local resident, Edward Harold Bell, a known exhibitionist, as a suspect. He had been arrested at least 12 times on charges of showing his genitals to children, but each time avoided imprisonment. Bell lived on a property near the beach in Galveston, where he was a silent partner of a surf shop. He knew two of the victims, Debbie Ackerman and Maria Johnson, who frequented the store. In the mid-1970s, he acquired a plot of land in Dickinson and lived near the place where two more victims, Brooks Bracewell and Georgia Geer, were last seen alive. In 1978, while masturbating on the street in front of a group of teenage girls, Bell was confronted by 26-year-old former Marine Larry Dickens. As his mother called the police, Dickens removed the keys from Bell's vehicle and refused to return them.

Bell killed Dickens and fled, but was subsequently apprehended by police. He posted bail several weeks later and fled the United States, evading police for over a decade. In 1993, he was arrested in Panama and extradited back to the United States, where he was subsequently convicted of Dickens' murder and received a 70-year sentence. In 1998, Bell wrote several letters to the Harris County Attorney, confessing to the murders of five girls in 1971 and six more between 1974 and 1977. He stated that he did not remember the names of most of his victims, but confidently stated that he had killed Debbie Ackerman, Maria Johnson, Colette Wilson and Kimberly Pitchford, as well as two other girls whom he had abducted from Webster in August 1971, later identified as Rhonda Johnson and Sharon Shaw. Despite this, Bell was never charged with these murders due to lack of evidence. He remained a prime suspect until his death in April 2019.

=== Mark Stallings ===
In 2013, Mark Roland Stallings, a convicted kidnapper serving a life term, confessed to killing a girl in 1991 and dumping her body in the fields. The victim was later identified as Donna Prudhomme. At the time of the murder, Stallings was living and working in League City near the homes of some of the girls who went missing and were subsequently found dead. Despite his knowledge of case details, he has not been charged with any additional murders. He remains a suspect in the murders of Donna Prudhomme and Audrey Cook, as well as two unrelated murders in Fort Bend County.

=== Clyde Edwin Hedrick ===
Clyde Hedrick was named as a suspect in the 2022 documentary series Crime Scene: The Texas Killing Fields. Hedrick was sentenced to 20 years in prison for the 1984 murder of Ellen Beason. Following his release in 2021, Hedrick lived in a halfway house. In July 2022, Tim Miller, father of victim Laura Miller and founder of Texas EquuSearch, filed a 2014 wrongful death lawsuit against Hedrick. Hedrick was a neighbor during the timeframe of Laura's disappearance. Tim Miller won $24 million in liability and damages. Hedrick was found civilly liable for Laura Miller's death but was not criminally charged. Hedrick had a previous criminal record that included charges of trespassing, theft, abuse of a corpse, attempted arson, possession of marijuana, driving while intoxicated and sexual assault. Hedrick allegedly made a jailhouse confession to murdering Miller and Villarreal-Fye. Hedrick committed suicide on March 21, 2026.

== Convictions ==
=== Ellen Beason case ===
Suspected serial killer Clyde Edwin Hedrick was brought in for questioning in 1985 in relation to Beason's suspicious death; he admitted that both of them had gone swimming in a nearby lake upon leaving a local bar, but he further stated that she had accidentally drowned while in the water. He then claimed to have disposed of her body out of fear of being accused of foul play. At the time, since her cause of death could not be ascertained, in 1996, Hedrick was convicted of abusing her corpse and was sentenced to a year in jail. In 2011, Hedrick's ex-wife approached authorities and said that Hedrick had frequently made incriminating remarks regarding Beason's death. This information, along with Beason's second autopsy, resulted in authorities getting an arrest warrant and charging Clyde with murder in 2014. Hedrick was convicted of manslaughter and sentenced to 20 years in prison. He was released from Estelle Supermax Penitentiary in Huntsville, Texas in October 2021.

=== Shelley Sikes case ===
In 1987, 30-year-old John Robert King phoned the El Paso police, claiming that on May 24, 1986, he, together with 33-year-old Gerald Peter Zwarst, attacked Shelley Sikes while she was in her car, after which the girl was raped and strangled. After his arrest, Zwarst told the police that he had hidden the body in one of the fields, where the other bodies were found. Both men were asked to indicate the whereabouts of Sikes' body in exchange for avoiding life sentences, but their directions failed to uncover it. King and Zwarst were convicted of aggravated kidnapping and received life sentences in 1998. They were also probed for other such crimes committed during the mid-1980s, but both vehemently denied any involvement. King died from natural causes behind bars in October 2015, while Zwarst died in prison in November 2020.

=== Krystal Jean Baker case ===
In April 2012, sixteen years after Krystal Jean Baker's beaten, raped, and strangled body was found, Kevin Edison Smith was arrested and convicted of murdering her. In 2009, Smith had been arrested on a drug charge in Louisiana. At about the same time, a detective tested Baker's dress for DNA. A match was confirmed, using advanced technology that was not available at the time of Krystal's disappearance. A jury deliberated for about 30 minutes and found Smith guilty of capital murder. He was sentenced to life in prison with the possibility of parole after 40 years.

=== William Lewis Reece ===
In May 1997, William Lewis Reece was arrested for the kidnapping and attempted murder of 19-year-old Sandra Sapaugh from Webster. The following year, he was found guilty and convicted, receiving a 60-year imprisonment term. In 2015, his DNA was matched to the killer of 19-year-old Tiffany Johnston, who was found murdered in Oklahoma in 1997. After this revelation, Reece confessed to killing Jessica Lee Cain and Kelli Ann Cox, leading the investigators to the bodies' burial sites. He had been suspected of kidnapping and killing Laura Smither and confessed to Friendswood Police, in 2016, that he murdered her. In 2021, Reece was convicted of Johnston's murder and sentenced to death. The following year, he was extradited to Texas and was convicted of the murders of Smither, Cain, and Cox, receiving a life term after pleading guilty to each of the three murders. He is currently awaiting a death penalty sentence in Oklahoma.

=== James Dolphs Elmore Jr. ===
On March 31, 2026, James Elmore was arrested and charged with manslaughter in the death of Laura Miller and two counts of felony tampering with evidence related to the disposal of the bodies of Miller and Audrey Lee Cook, 42 years after Miller's death. Authorities alleged that Elmore contributed to Miller's death by providing Hedrick with cocaine that was given to her. Before his arrest, Elmore met multiple times with Miller's father, Tim Miller, and provided information about the murders that had not been made public. Galveston County District Attorney Kenneth Cusick said Elmore had been friends with Hedrick for many years. Since 1984, Elmore has been arrested on multiple drug charges, including delivery of methamphetamine and possession of marijuana. In 1993, he was charged with three counts of attempted murder and was sentenced to one year in county jail. Other charges include forgery, assault on a family member, and burglary.

Elmore was convicted of manslaughter in September 2026 and was sentenced to 20 years in prison.

== Media adaptations ==
=== Texas Killing Fields (2011) ===
A film adaptation of the deadly events that occurred along I-45 highway was released on September 9, 2011, with the title Texas Killing Fields. It was directed by Ami Canaan Mann and starred Sam Worthington and Jeffrey Dean Morgan. The film is loosely based on the murders while depicting a fictional portrayal of the struggle that local police faced while attempting to solve the murders. The film focuses on the lead police detectives, Captain Brian Goetschius and Mike Land, who dedicated their careers to solving the mysteries of I-45. The filmmakers hired officers Goetschius and Land as consultants while making the movie.

Janet Miller, mother of victim Laura Miller, said in an interview with the Dallas Morning News that she was angry at first about the film, stating "I was upset because no one notified me. The parents should know what's going on." Tim Miller, the father of Laura Miller, said he saw the film for what the filmmakers intended — to raise awareness about the crimes and to generate new tips. In an interview with CBS News for 48 Hours, actor Sam Worthington said, "People — you never know — might just go and see the movie and go, 'Oh, I remember when someone went down in the fields, and I remember a certain car and a certain person seemed a bit dodgy.' Maybe a family can then know what happened to their daughter."

=== Crime Scene: The Texas Killing Fields (2022) ===
Crime Scene: The Texas Killing Fields, a three-part miniseries about the Texas Killing Fields, was released on Netflix in November 2022. The series was directed by Jessica Dimmock. It was rated as the top docuseries on Netflix, with 23,880,000 total hours viewed, and received positive reviews.

== See also ==
- Gwynns Falls/Leakin Park – notorious body dumping ground in Baltimore, Maryland

General:

- List of fugitives from justice who disappeared
- List of serial killers in the United States
