= Ed Bell =

Ed Bell may refer to:

- Ed Bell (American football)
- Ed Bell (musician)

== See also ==
- Edward Bell (disambiguation)
