= Crime Scene Berlin: Nightlife Killer =

2024 documentary television series

- Genre: Documentary
- Written by: Caroline Schaper
- Directed by: Joe Berlinger
- Starring: Miroslaw Wawak; Tristan Bumm; Niklas Kohrt; Rick Hübner; Katrin Faust; Debbie Pollack; Andreas Voges
- Composers: Uwe Bossenz; Anton Feist
- Country of origin: United States
- Original languages: English; German
- No. of episodes: 3

Production
- Executive producers: Joe Berlinger; Georg Tschurtschenthaler; Florian Fettweis
- Producer: Christian Beetz
- Cinematography: Jan Zabeil
- Running time: 34–37 minutes
- Production company: Beetz Brothers Film Production

Original release
- Network: Netflix
- Release: April 3, 2024

Crime Scene Berlin: Nightlife Killer is a 2024 Netflix limited docuseries directed by Joe Berlinger and written by Caroline Schaper. It is the fourth installment in the Crime Scene documentary series, following Crime Scene: The Texas Killing Fields. The three-part true crime docuseries charts the true story surrounding a series of murders that took place in Berlin, Germany in 2012, and how the police worked to track down the killer. It was released on April 3, 2024, on Netflix.

== Episodes ==
No.	Title	Original release date
1	"A Mysterious Death"	April 3, 2024
2	"A Serial Killer in Berlin"	April 3, 2024
3	"The Lust to Kill"	April 3, 2024
