= Crime Scene: The Times Square Killer =

2021 documentary television series

- Promotional poster
- Genre: Docu-series
- Directed by: Joe Berlinger
- Starring: Charlie Meany
- Country of origin: United States
- Original language: English
- No. of seasons: 1
- No. of episodes: 3

Production
- Executive producers: Jon Doran; Luke Colson; Brian Grazer; Ron Howard; Joe Berlinger; Justin Wilkes; Kate Berry; Samantha Grogin; Jon Karmen; Jen Isaacson; Leslie Mattingly
- Producers: Ashley B Carley; Sydney Carlock; Ken Daly
- Cinematography: Jeff Hutchens
- Production companies: Imagine Documentaries; RadicalMedia; Third Eye Moving Picture Company

Original release
- Network: Netflix
- Release: December 29, 2021

Crime Scene: The Times Square Killer is a 2021 American limited docuseries made for Netflix and directed by Joe Berlinger. It is the second installment in the Crime Scene documentary series, following Crime Scene: The Vanishing at the Cecil Hotel. Its story focuses on the series of 1970s-1980s murders that were carried out by American serial killer Richard Cottingham, also known as the Times Square Killer and the Torso Killer. The series was released on December 29, 2021.

== Episodes ==
| No. | Title | Original release date |
|---|---|---|
| 1 | "Murder on 42nd St." | December 29, 2021 |
| 2 | "The Perfect Hunting Ground" | December 29, 2021 |
| 3 | "End of an Era" | December 29, 2021 |
