= Crime Scene: The Texas Killing Fields =

2022 true crime docuseries

- Promotional poster
- Genre: Docuseries
- Directed by: Jessica Dimmock
- Country of origin: United States
- Original language: English
- No. of episodes: 3

Production
- Executive producers: Brian Grazer; Ron Howard; Jon Kamen; Sar Bernstein; Joe Berlinger; Jen Isaccson; Jon Doran; Justin Wilkes; Leslie Mattingly
- Producer: Sydney Carlock
- Running time: 47-51 minutes
- Production companies: Imagine Documentaries; RadicalMedia; Third Eye Moving Picture Company

Original release
- Network: Netflix
- Release: November 29, 2022

Crime Scene: The Texas Killing Fields is a 2022 Netflix limited docuseries directed by Jessica Dimmock. It is the third installment in the Crime Scene documentary series, following Crime Scene: The Times Square Killer. The true crime series is centered around the unsolved murders of four women in Texas in the 80s and 90s in an area known as the Texas Killing Fields, located in League City, Texas. It was released on November 29, 2022.

As of December 4, 2022, it was rated as the top docuseries on Netflix, with 23,880,000 total hours viewed.

== Reception ==
On Rotten Tomatoes, all 3 critics' reviews were positive.
