= Murder of Danielle van Dam =

Murder of 7-year-old American girl

Danielle Van Dam
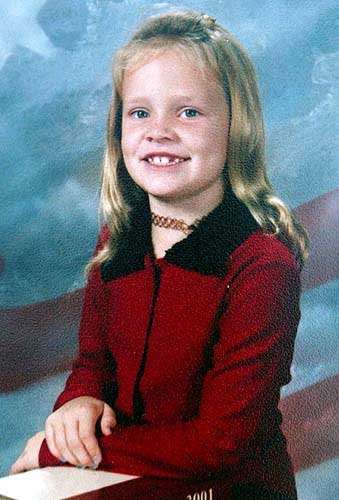
- Van Dam in 2001
- Born: Danielle Nicole Van Dam; September 22, 1994; Plano, Texas, U.S.
- Disappeared: February 1, 2002 (aged 7); Sabre Springs, California, U.S.
- Cause of death: Homicide of undetermined cause
- Body discovered: February 27, 2002, Dehesa, California, U.S.
- Known for: Murder victim
- Parents: Damon Van Dam (father); Brenda Van Dam (mother)

Danielle Van Dam (September 22, 1994 – February 2002) was an American girl from the Sabre Springs neighborhood of San Diego, California, who disappeared from her bedroom during the night of February 1–2, 2002. Her body was found by searchers on February 27 in a remote area. Police suspected a neighbor, David Alan Westerfield, of the killing. He was arrested, tried, and convicted of kidnapping and first-degree murder. Westerfield was sentenced to death and is currently incarcerated at High Desert State Prison.

== The crime ==
On the evening of Friday, February 1, 2002, Danielle van Dam's mother Brenda and two friends went out to a bar, called Dad's, in Poway. Danielle's father, Damon, stayed at home with Danielle and her two brothers. Damon put Danielle to bed around 10:30 p.m., and she fell asleep. Damon also slept until his wife returned home at around 2:00 a.m. with four of her friends. Brenda noticed a light on the home's security alarm system was flashing, and discovered that the side door to the garage was open. The six chatted for approximately half an hour, then Brenda's friends went home. Damon and Brenda went to sleep believing that their daughter was sleeping in her room. About an hour later, Damon awoke and noticed that an alarm light was flashing. He found the sliding glass door leading to the back yard open, so he closed it. The next morning, Danielle was discovered missing, and her parents called the police at 9:39 a.m.

Danielle became the subject of search efforts, with hundreds of volunteers searching deserts, highways and remote areas for weeks. The Laura Recovery Center assisted in organizing the search, and a Danielle Recovery Center was set up in a real estate office in Poway to coordinate the searching. Finally, on February 27, two searchers found her nude, partially decomposed body near a trail in Dehesa, California, an unincorporated town east of San Diego. Some searchers had decided to search the Dehesa Road area, near the trail, after detectives discovered traces of Danielle's blood in David Westerfield's motor home, because Dehesa Road was a possible route Westerfield could have taken to get to the desert. Because of the condition of the body, the coroner was unable to determine the cause of death or whether she was sexually assaulted, and had to use dental records to confirm her identity.

== David Westerfield ==
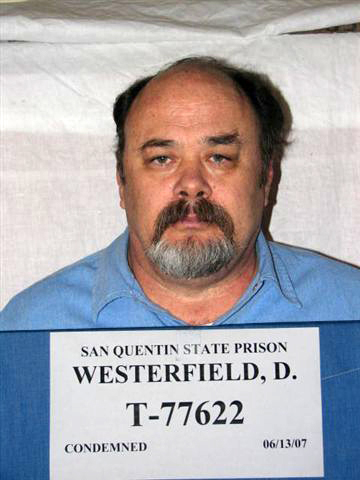
Westerfield in 2007

Law enforcement officials interviewed the van Dams' neighbors the Saturday morning of Danielle's disappearance, and discovered that one neighbor, David Westerfield, was not at home.

Westerfield (born February 25, 1952), was a 49-year-old self-employed engineer at the time and held several patents for medical devices.

Westerfield graduated from James Madison High School. He had no criminal record at the time, and was a divorced father of two college students. Westerfield lived two doors down from the van Dams and owned a luxury motorhome.

A few days before Danielle's disappearance, Danielle and Brenda sold Girl Scout Cookies to Westerfield, who invited them into his home. Brenda asked to see his kitchen because she noticed it was being remodeled when they sold cookies to him the previous year.

On Saturday morning, Westerfield fetched his motor home from another part of town, stocked it with supplies, and left home at 9:50, minutes after Brenda called 911 to report Danielle missing. Westerfield later told police that he had driven around the desert and the beach in his motor home, and had stayed at a beach campground: this was later confirmed by witnesses, cell phone records, gas receipts, and credit card records. Westerfield said that he had intended to go to the desert, but realized he had forgotten his wallet, so Westerfield drove to the campground at Silver Strand State Beach instead. He paid in advance for a two-night stay, but Westerfield decided the weather was too cold, so he returned home to look for his wallet, after which he went to the desert. A witness at Silver Strand later testified that he saw Westerfield pull out his wallet while at the campground. Westerfield drove to the desert, where he got stuck in the sand on Sunday morning about a quarter mile off the road and needed help from a tow truck to get free.

On his way home on Monday morning, a sleepy-looking and bare-footed Westerfield stopped at his regular dry cleaners and dropped off two comforters, two pillow covers, and a jacket that would later yield traces of Danielle's blood. When law enforcement first interviewed Westerfield, he did not mention going to the dry cleaners, although Westerfield detailed almost every other stop on his outing.

Law enforcement placed Westerfield under 24-hour surveillance on February 4, noting that he had given his RV a cleaning when he returned from his trip, although Westerfield maintained it was normal for him to do so. His motorhome, SUV, and other property was impounded for testing on February 5.

Westerfield stated that he did not know where Danielle was, but he said that he had been at the same bar Brenda had been to that Friday night, which Brenda confirmed.

== Arrest and trial ==
On February 22, police arrested Westerfield for Danielle's kidnapping after two small stains of her blood were found on his clothing and in his motor home. Danielle's partially decomposed body was found five days later. Westerfield pleaded not guilty, and went on trial on June 4, 2002. In pre-trial motions, Westerfield's lawyers moved to have his statements to police excluded, charging that he was unfairly interrogated for more than nine hours by detectives who ignored his repeated requests to call a lawyer, take a shower, eat, and sleep. In the end, the two officers against whom the defense directed their complaint did not testify.

The forensic evidence presented by the prosecution included Danielle's blood stains on Westerfield's jacket and on the floor of his motor home, Danielle's fingerprints in the motor home, hairs from the van Dam family dog on Westerfield's motor home bed comforter, hairs consistent with Danielle's on the sheet of his bed, and matching acrylic fibers found on Danielle's body and in Westerfield's home, among other evidence. One witness testified that she had left a side door in the garage unlocked, and prosecutor Jeff Dusek theorized that Westerfield might have entered this way. However, he emphasized that the prosecution did not have the burden to demonstrate how the kidnapping was done, only that it was done.

During the trial, Westerfield's lawyers suggested that the police were in a rush to solve the case and declined to consider other suspects. They suggested that the child pornography found on Westerfield's computer was downloaded by Westerfield's son, Neal, who was 18 at the time of the murder. In testimony, Neal denied this. Part of Westerfield's defense focused on the lifestyle of Danielle van Dam's parents, who they argued had an open marriage, were swingers, and smoked marijuana in their garage regularly. The defense suggested that because of this lifestyle, there might have been other people in the home that night.

To establish an alibi for Westerfield, the defense called three entomologists who testified that insects first colonized Danielle's body sometime in mid-February, long after Westerfield had been under police surveillance. The prosecution's entomologist testified that Danielle's body could have been colonized as early as February 2.

In closing arguments, defense attorney Steven Feldman argued that no evidence of Westerfield was found in the van Dam residence, or at the body dump site, and that a foreign hair found under Danielle's body was not his. In rebuttal, Dusek argued that it is plausible for an intruder to enter a home without leaving trace evidence, especially if he is taking appropriate precautions. Conversely, Dusek argued, the nature and volume of Danielle's trace evidence in Westerfield's home and motor home, and on his jacket, allows no reasonable explanation other than guilt.

The trial lasted two months and concluded on August 8. A few weeks later, on August 21, the jury found Westerfield guilty of first degree murder, kidnapping, and possession of child pornography.

During the penalty phase of the trial, Westerfield's 19-year-old niece testified that, when she was seven years old, her uncle entered his daughter's bedroom, where the niece was spending the night with her parents while attending a party, and woke up to find Westerfield rubbing her teeth. She said she bit his finger as hard as she could, then went downstairs to tell her mother. Westerfield was questioned about the incident at the time by his sister-in-law, where he explained that he had entered the bedroom to check on the children, and was trying to comfort her. The incident was then forgotten.

The penalty phase ended on September 16 when the jury rendered a verdict of death against Westerfield. In January 2003, Judge William Mudd sentenced Westerfield to death.

== Aftermath ==
Westerfield is currently incarcerated at High Desert State Prison due to the continuing 2006 moratorium on executions in California, and the July 2014 ruling on the unconstitutionality of the death penalty in California. It is not known when or if Westerfield will face execution.

The van Dams sued Westerfield, but the case was settled out of court. The van Dams were awarded $416,000 from several insurance companies who insured Westerfield's home, SUV, and motor home. The settlement also prevents Westerfield from ever profiting from his crime.

When the trial was over, the media, quoting unnamed police sources, reported that Westerfield's lawyers were just minutes away from negotiating a plea bargain when a group of private citizen searchers organized by the Laura Recovery Center found Danielle's body. According to these reports, under the deal Westerfield would have taken police to the site where her body was located, in exchange for a sentence of life without parole. Both the prosecution and the defense declined to comment on these reports. Many people, including Fox News commentator Bill O'Reilly, expressed outrage at the revelation, claiming that Westerfield's attorneys misled the jury by proposing an "unknown kidnapper scenario" even though their client said he knew the location of the body; however, legal specialists pointed out that defense attorneys are obligated to mount a vigorous defense regardless of their own opinion of the client's guilt or innocence.

In the months following the end of the trial, audio tapes of Westerfield being interviewed were released to the media. During his first interview, he is heard to ask an officer to "leave your gun here for a few minutes" in a seeming suggestion that he would like to commit suicide. In one police interview he tells investigators that he does not feel emotionally stable. In one interview he is told that he failed a polygraph test; Westerfield says he wants a retest and that he was not involved in Danielle's disappearance.

In late 2003, San Diego police received a letter from an outside party confessing to Danielle's murder. The author claimed to be James Selby, a man accused of various sex-related crimes in five states, including in the San Diego area. Both police and Dusek read the letter, and deemed it not credible; however, Dusek forwarded the letter to the office of Westerfield's attorney, Steven Feldman, who declined to comment. Selby, who also claimed responsibility for the slaying of JonBenét Ramsey, committed suicide while awaiting sentencing in Arizona on November 22, 2004.

An episode of Animal Witness, an animal-based forensic series on the American TV network Animal Planet, was based on the belief that hairs consistent with Danielle's dog, which were found in Westerfield's laundry, in his RV, and on his comforter at the dry-cleaners, first got onto her pajamas when she cuddled with the dog, and then were carried on the pajamas to his house and RV in accordance with Locard's exchange principle.

== Legacy ==
An overpass on Interstate 8 at N 2nd Street in El Cajon has been named the Danielle van Dam Memorial Overpass. It is near the place where her body was found.

The years after the murder have led to increased levels of crime awareness in San Diego's neighborhoods as well as the institution of funds and benefits made in her honor. Her family still lives in Southern California. They have formed a Danielle Legacy Foundation which works to "promote volunteerism that will initiate positive changes that will put our children's safety first."

== See also ==
- List of kidnappings
- List of solved missing person cases (2000s)
- Child abduction scare of 2002
