= William Lewis Reece =

American serial killer (born 1959)

- Born: July 1, 1959 (age 67); Oklahoma, U.S.
- Convictions: Oklahoma: First degree murder (1 count); Texas: Murder (3 counts); Aggravated kidnapping Theft
- Penalty: Oklahoma: Death; Texas: Life imprisonment (murder charges); 60 years imprisonment (kidnapping charges)

Details
- Victims: 4+
- Span of crimes: April 3 – August 17, 1997
- Country: United States
- States: Texas, Oklahoma
- Date apprehended: 1997
- Imprisoned at: Oklahoma State Penitentiary

William Lewis Reece (born July 1, 1959) is an American serial killer, rapist, and trucker formerly active in the U.S. States of Oklahoma and Texas. He is currently incarcerated in Texas and awaiting a death penalty sentence in Oklahoma.

In 2015, Reece was linked via DNA to the 1997 cold case murder of a woman in Oklahoma, for which he was subsequently convicted and sentenced to death in 2021. Not long after, he pled guilty to three different murders associated with the Texas Killing Fields in Galveston and Brazoria counties, and was sentenced to three life sentences in 2022.

== Early life, career and marriages ==
William Lewis Reece was born on July 1, 1959, in Oklahoma, one of 13 siblings. He was raised on a farm near Yukon, but also spent time in foster care. Due to his parents' financial issues, he was forced to quit school after the ninth grade and take on a job horseshoeing. In 1979, he married Judy Flaming after she became pregnant.

After their marriage, Reece enlisted in the Oklahoma National Guard, but left after some time. His wife divorced him a year into their marriage. Reece convinced her to remarry him, and the couple had a second child shortly afterward. Flaming said Reece became physically abusive during their second marriage. Flaming went to the police after a beating and said that her husband had threatened to kill her with a knife and shotgun. She divorced him again shortly afterward in 1982.

Reece remarried, but his second wife divorced him as well. Later in life, he would find work as a trucker.

== 1980s rapes, convictions, and imprisonment ==
In April 1986, Reece kidnapped the 19-year-old daughter of a sheriff's deputy. The woman was driving to a local gym when her car stalled. Reece, who worked as a truck driver at the time, lured her into his truck with the promise of taking her to the nearest payphone. Instead, he tied the woman up and raped her in several parking lots. He allowed her to use the bathroom, giving her an opportunity to escape and call the police. Reece was arrested and charged with kidnapping and oral sodomy, but was released from custody after paying his bail.

While awaiting trial, he sexually assaulted another woman. He was put on trial for both rapes, found guilty, and sentenced to 25 years imprisonment. His attorneys appealed the conviction to a criminal court, which granted a review of his case. The results indicated that there were procedural errors in Reece's criminal case, causing his sentence to be reduced and leading to his parole in October 1996. He served 10 years.

== 1997 release and killings ==
After his release, Reece moved into his mother's home in Anadarko, Oklahoma. In early 1997, he regained his driver's license and moved to Houston, Texas. In 2016, Reece confessed to several killings during the summer of 1997.

=== Laura Smither ===
Reece claimed he committed his first murder on April 3, 1997, when he killed 12-year-old Laura Smither in Friendswood. According to Reece, he accidentally hit Smither with his car on a rainy day. He admitted to hiding Smither's body in a lake. Later, Reece admitted to strangling the girl to death, but denied sexually assaulting her.

=== Kelli Cox ===
Reece also confessed that on July 15, 1997, he was driving from Oklahoma to Houston when he stopped to buy some whiskey at a gas station in Denton. He claimed that he got into a physical confrontation with 20-year-old Kelli Cox, a student at the University of North Texas and strangled her in the ensuing fight. Cox was found buried in the woods in Brazoria County. Like with the Smither case, he insisted that Cox had not been sexually assaulted.

=== Tiffany Johnston ===
On July 26, 1997, Tiffany Johnston's Dodge Neon was found abandoned at the Sunshine Car Wash in Bethany, Oklahoma. The owner of the Sunshine Car Wash told police that Reece frequently used the car wash. Johnston's body was later found on the side of a dirt road near the I-40. Johnston, 19, had been sexually assaulted, beaten and strangled. Reece was later charged with her murder in 2015 and sentenced to death for her murder in 2021.

According to Reece's account, on July 26, 1997, he stopped at the Sunshine Car Wash in Bethany to clean his truck and accidentally sprayed Johnston. Without witnesses, he grabbed the teenager and dragged her inside the trailer, where he raped her at gunpoint. Reece struck her over the head with a horseshoe and attacked her. He admitted strangling her and putting her body in the woods by the side of a road, where it was discovered the following day. Reece stated that he knew Johnston's mother, Kathy Dobry, who lived in Anadarko. Dobry had once taken him to renew his driver's license after it expired while he was incarcerated and was an acquaintance of his mother and other members of his family.

=== Jessica Cain ===
17-year-old Jessica Cain was reported missing on August 17, 1997. She was last seen alive after leaving a Bennigan's in the Clear Lake City suburb of Houston, and her car was abandoned on an interstate highway later that day. Reece claimed he had approached her outside the restaurant, but she rebuffed him. Angered, he tailed her vehicle until she was forced to stop and confront him. He admitted that he beat and strangled her.

== 1997 kidnapping, conviction and second imprisonment ==
In the fall of 1997, Reece became a suspect in the kidnapping and attempted rape of 19-year-old Sandra Sapaugh. According to her testimony, in May 1997, Sapaugh stopped her car at a gas station in Webster to use a pay phone, where she was spotted by Reece. She got into her car and began to drive, but after a few minutes she realized that one of her tires was flat and was forced to stop. Reece, trailing behind her in his white truck, stopped and offered to help her.

After luring her inside his truck, Reece overpowered Sapaugh and bound her wrists before continuing driving along I-45. Sapaugh managed to break free from the restraints and jumped out of the truck, sustaining severe injuries to her body in the process. She survived and was taken to a nearby hospital, where she contacted the police. She described her attacker, but as she could not recall important details, she was put under hypnosis. In her hypnotized state, Sapaugh was able to recall Reece's license plate number. Sapaugh singled Reece out as the assailant in a police photo array, which led to his arrest.

Reece was convicted of the kidnapping charge in 1998 and sentenced to 60 years imprisonment.

Police became suspicious that Reece was involved in the disappearance of three teenage girls from Houston and the surrounding suburbs, one of whom was last seen alive and later found murdered near his workplace.

=== Identification ===
After his conviction for kidnapping and rape, Reece was transferred to the Ellis Unit to serve his sentence. In the early 2000s, he was compelled by law to submit DNA samples to be entered into CODIS.

In 2007, he was convicted of theft in Texas.

In 2015, his DNA was matched to the murder of 19-year-old Tiffany Johnston. Johnston had been sexually assaulted, beaten and strangled. On September 21, 2015, Reece was formally charged with her murder.

In early 2016, Reece began cooperating with Texas Ranger James Holland, admitted responsibility for Johnston's murder, and further confessed to three murders in Houston during the summer of 1997. During interrogations, Holland promised Reece helicopter rides to McDonald's, cigarettes and dip in exchange for confessing details of the murders and providing burial locations for missing victims. Holland provided Reece with written promises from the district attorneys of Denton and Galveston counties promising not to seek the death penalty.

With the help of his attorneys, he contacted the prosecutor's offices in Brazoria and Harris Counties, and provided a map of the burial sites. He then offered to admit fully to the crimes in court to avoid the death penalty and guarantee he would serve his sentence in Oklahoma. Authorities refused the deal, excavated the burial sites indicated on the map, and discovered the skeletal remains of Kelli Ann Cox and Jessica Cain. Reece confessed to the murders of Laura Smither, Kelli Cox, Tiffany Johnston, and Jessica Cain but refused to admit a sexual motive for many of the crimes.

== Murder trials ==
=== Oklahoma trial ===
In July 2016, Reece was extradited from Texas to Oklahoma to stand trial for the murder of Johnston. A few days later, he appeared before the Oklahoma County District Court, where a hearing was scheduled for October 10, 2016, after he waived his right to a speedy trial.

The trial began on April 21, 2017. Reece's defense team filed a motion for a change of venue, claiming that the county courthouse offices contained asbestos dust that could negatively affect the health of the trial's participants. An independent examination concluded that the building's condition was hazardous. The trial adjourned until June 2019. In the meantime, prosecutors from Texas announced that they would extradite him to their state to stand trial for the murders of Smither, Cox, and Cain after the end of his Oklahoma trial.

The trial was indefinitely postponed due to the COVID-19 pandemic and resumed in May 2021. Among the people present at the trial were Tiffany Johnston's relatives, law enforcement officers involved in the murder investigation, Sandra Sapaugh, and two other girls who claimed that Reece had kidnapped and raped them in the Houston area on July 3, 1997. On May 28, he was found guilty on all counts by jury verdict. His defense attorney had advocated for an acquittal based on the supposedly broken plea agreement between his client and law enforcement officials.

On August 19, 2021, Reece was officially sentenced to death by the Oklahoma County District Court. After the trial, prosecutors stated that Reece had given partially false information in his confession and failed to disclose both his true motives for the crime and the accurate details. Two days before his conviction, he was charged with possessing prohibited items after a search of his cell at the county jail revealed that he had purchased a cell phone from fellow inmates.

=== Texas trial ===
Following his conviction for Johnston's murder in Oklahoma, Reece was extradited to stand trial in Texas in early March 2022. He pleaded guilty to the murders of Laura Smither, Jessica Cain, and Kelli Ann Cox, and was sentenced to life imprisonment in June 2022. He pleaded guilty to Cain and Smith's murders in Galveston County and to Cox's murder in Brazoria County.

== Incarceration and current status ==
Ever since his conviction, Reece remains incarcerated at the Polunsky unit in Texas. He filed an appeal against his conviction in Oklahoma, arguing that his confession was coerced, but the Oklahoma Court of Criminal Appeals denied the appeal on July 10, 2025.

In January 2026, Oklahoma Attorney General Gentner Drummond announced that Reece was extradited back to the state's death row from Texas, where he had been incarcerated for the crimes committed there.

== See also ==
- Capital punishment in Oklahoma
- 1995 Okinawa rape incident
- List of death row inmates in the United States § Oklahoma
- List of serial killers in the United States
