= Crime Scene (docuseries) =

Crime Scene is a docuseries directed by Joe Berlinger and aired on Netflix. There are currently four seasons.

- Crime Scene: The Vanishing at the Cecil Hotel
- Crime Scene: The Times Square Killer
- Crime Scene: The Texas Killing Fields
- Crime Scene Berlin: Nightlife Killer
