= Thoughts & Prayers (2025 film) =

2025 American documentary film

- Official poster
- Directed by: Zackary Canepari; Jessica Dimmock
- Produced by: Claire Read; Gary Kout
- Cinematography: Jarred Alterman
- Edited by: Carter Gunn; Myles Kane
- Music by: Matthew Joynt
- Production companies: HBO Documentary Films; Tony Tina
- Distributed by: HBO
- Release dates: November 12, 2025 (DOC NYC); November 18, 2025 (United States)
- Running time: 85 minutes
- Country: United States
- Language: English

Thoughts & Prayers: Or How to Survive an Active Shooter in America is a 2025 American documentary film directed by Zackary Canepari and Jessica Dimmock. It explores active shooter training and the industry surrounding it.

It had its world premiere at DOC NYC on November 12, 2025, and was released on November 18, 2025, by HBO.

== Premise ==
Explores the $3 billion active shooter training industry and its effect on students and educators.

== Production ==
Zachary Canepari and Jessica Dimmock decided to make the film as their daughter was going through school and discussing safety. Dimmock was curious about the effect it would have on their daughter and all kids going through drills. Canepari and Dimmock opted to not include politics or lawmakers and only included statistics in order to make the film accessible to all. The film participated in the 2022 Gotham Project Market.

== Release ==
It had its world premiere at DOC NYC on November 12, 2025. It was released on November 18, 2025, by HBO.

== Reception ==
On the review aggregator website Rotten Tomatoes, 90% of 10 critics' reviews are positive.

Jacob Oller of The A.V. Club praised the film writing: "It’s objectively ridiculous and vulgar, and the filmmakers mostly allow the interview subjects to stew in their own damning words." David Ehrlich of IndieWire gave the film a B writing: "Canepari and Dimmock’s film may present itself as a po-faced look at “how to survive an active shooter in America”, but make no mistake: This is a straight-faced comedy about the power of mass psychosis." For The Playlist, Rodrigo Perez wrote, "The film's anger is muted but unmistakable. 'Thoughts & Prayers' is about a nation that would rather teach children how to hide, how to bleed, how to die — than pass even the most modest gun reforms." In an interview with the directors, gun violence researcher Dr. David Riedman described the film as "postmodern 90-minute examination of the insanity of modern America. It shows the worst parts of fear and gore culture combined with capitalism".
