= The Gamekillers =

- Directed by: Luke McCoubrey; Peter McCoubrey; Dave Hamilton
- Country of origin: United States
- Original language: English

Production
- Executive producers: Justin Wilkes; Robert Friedman; Jon Kamen; David Rubin; Frank Scherma; Bruce Wellington
- Production company: RadicalMedia

Original release
- Network: MTV
- Release: 2007

The Gamekillers is a one-hour television special that aired on MTV in the United States on February 6, 2006, and re-aired on The Comedy Network in Canada. It was a cross-promotional event with Axe Dry, who had previously used the "Gamekiller" premise in an ad campaign. Therefore, the television series is known as "branded content".

The "Gamekillers" are a collection of stereotyped characters who represent certain personalities who, according to Axe and the show's producers, teens and 20-somethings often encounter throughout the course of their social life. In particular, each Gamekiller is said to be particularly skilled at inadvertently—or sometimes purposely—ruining a date and breaking up a couple.

== Characters ==
Name	Synopsis
British Accent Guy	Impresses women with his phony accent and general foreignness
The Mother Hen	A domineering girl who micromanages the lives of her girlfriends
Carl	An average single friend who considers dating to be a low priority, compared to other hobbies, like sports
The Mess	A guy who is not only a slob, but tries to provoke immaturity from his friends
Early Man	A generally macho, strong bully
The Balladeer	Uses musical skills to woo women
The Pace Car	A girl who is distractingly attractive, though "out of your league".
Sensitivo	An overly sensitive and protective, possibly gay, male friend of a girl
Man Candy	A distractingly attractive man who can easily steal dates
Drama Queen	A girl who makes a big production out of everything
The Baller	A basketball athlete who uses his skills to impress
IQ	A smart guy who "claims" you won't get the girl
The One Upper	A guy who claims to be doing something better and more interesting than what others have done
Man With Dog	A guy who uses his dog to impress a girl
Kash Munni	A wealthy, snobbish guy who flaunts his cash everywhere he goes

In the show, each Gamekiller was profiled, and actors playing certain ones were introduced to unsuspecting real-life couples to ruin their dates.

== TV series ==
MTV ordered five half-hour episodes of The Gamekillers, evolving the original 2006 special into a full television series. The first episode premiered on September 21, 2007. In each episode, a male contestant who thinks he is on a simple reality dating show goes on a series of dates with an actress who he believes to be a fellow contestant. Every situation he finds himself in is completely staged, and in every date the contestant is confronted with a Gamekiller, whose purpose is to throw the date off course and ruin the contestant's chances of success. If the contestant overcomes the challenges, his name is etched onto the "ancient Axe Gamekillers Chalice", alongside other such historical ladies' men as Hugh Hefner, Casanova, John Hancock and Sasquatch.

This series reprises some of the Gamekiller roles featured in the original special and introduces several new characters:

New characters
Name	Synopsis
The Swarm	A group of the girl's best friends, who relentlessly interrogate and embarrass you
Natural Disaster	The politically correct, new age, earthy guy who uses his green ways to impress girls while criticizing your lifestyle
The Flirt	A provocative girl who will flirt and tease you, distracting you from the girl you're with
The Wand	The street magician who uses his magic tricks to impress the girl and annoy you
The Conquistador	The sultry, world-traveling Casanova-type whose mastery of romance languages and knowledge of foreign lands impresses and charms girls
The Jokester	The guy who is "always on", using his quick wit to get laughs, often at your expense
