= Without (film) =

- Promotional poster
- Directed by: Mark Jackson
- Written by: Mark Jackson
- Produced by: Mark Jackson; Jessica Dimmock; Michael Requa; Jaime Keeling
- Starring: Joslyn Jensen; Ron Carrier
- Cinematography: Jessica Dimmock; Diego Garcia
- Edited by: Mark Jackson
- Music by: Dave Eggar; Nancy Magarill
- Release date: January 2011 (Slamdance)
- Running time: 87 minutes
- Country: United States
- Language: English

Without is a 2011 American drama film written and directed by Mark Jackson and starring Joslyn Jensen and Ron Carrier.

== Cast ==
- Joslyn Jensen as Joslyn
- Ron Carrier as Frank
- Darren Lenz as Darren
- Bob Sentinella
- Piper Weiss
- Brooke Bundy
- Jodi Long
- Kristine Haruna Lee
- Kate Matter
- Joe Matter

== Release ==
The film premiered at the Slamdance Film Festival in January 2011.

== Reception ==
The film has a 90% rating on Rotten Tomatoes based on 10 reviews.

Rob Nelson of Variety gave the film a positive review and wrote, “Smallish fests won’t want to be without Without.”

Ben Umstead of ScreenAnarchy also gave the film a positive review and wrote, “There comes a point in Mark Jackson's debut feature where the tempo of tension is so great that even the sound of a door closing promises to shatter the entire frame into a million little pieces.”

The Hollywood Reporter also gave the film a positive review: “Impressive American indie explores an immature young woman's mental instability with gripping intensity.”
