= We Are: The Brooklyn Saints =

- Promotional poster
- Genre: Docuseries; sports film
- Directed by: Rudy Valdez
- Music by: Jongnic Bontemps
- Country of origin: United States
- Original language: English
- No. of seasons: 1
- No. of episodes: 4

Production
- Cinematography: Daniel Carter; Julia Liu; Rudy Valdez
- Editors: Kim Hall; Viridiana Lieberman; Carlos Rojas; Hana Wuerker
- Running time: 44-50 minutes
- Production companies: Disarming Films; Imagine Documentaries

Original release
- Release: January 29, 2021

We Are: The Brooklyn Saints is a 2021 American docuseries created for Netflix and directed by Rudy Valdez. Its story follows the players, coaches and parents of the Brooklyn Saints, a youth football program in the east New York neighborhood of Brooklyn, throughout their 2019 season. The series was released on January 29, 2021.

== Reception ==
The series received a 91% approval rating on the review aggregator site Rotten Tomatoes.
