= Murders of Rhonda Johnson and Sharon Shaw =

Murder victims from Texas, United States

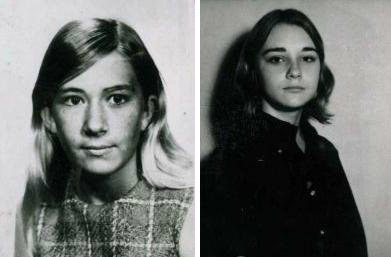
- Rhonda Johnson and Sharon Shaw
- Date: August 4, 1971
- Location: Galveston, Texas, U.S.
- Deaths: Rhonda Renee Johnson; Sharon Lynn Shaw
- Convicted: Michael Lloyd Self
- Charges: Murder
- Sentence: Life imprisonment

Rhonda Renee Johnson (December 16, 1956 – August 4, 1971) and Sharon Lynn Shaw (August 11, 1957 – August 4, 1971) were two American teenage girls who disappeared in Harris County, Texas, on the afternoon of August 4, 1971. In early 1972, the skeletal remains of both girls were discovered in and around Clear Lake near Galveston Bay.

A local man, Michael Lloyd Self, was charged with the murders in 1972 and convicted of Shaw's murder in 1975. Controversy arose in 1998 when convicted killer Edward Harold Bell confessed to both murders. Bell's confession – and corroborating statements from both law enforcement and prosecutors that Self had been coerced into a false confession – led many to believe that Self had been wrongfully convicted. Self died in prison in 2000.

The case has often been associated with the Texas Killing Fields, a 25-acre section of land off of Interstate 45 in League City where the bodies of dozens of young women have been discovered since the 1970s. A fictionalized film about the area, titled Texas Killing Fields, was released in 2011.

== Disappearance ==
On August 4, 1971, Rhonda Johnson (born December 16, 1956, in Houston, Texas) and Sharon Shaw (born August 11, 1957, in Mobile, Alabama), both of Webster, Texas, spent the day on a Galveston beach, approximately one week before Shaw's fourteenth birthday. The girls were seen leaving the beach, but did not return home. Eyewitnesses reported last seeing the girls walking on Seawall Boulevard in Galveston.

== Discovery of bodies ==
On January 3, 1972, two boys fishing in Clear Lake discovered a human skull floating in the water, which they had initially believed to be a sports ball. Six weeks later, searchers discovered the rest of the body, along with that of another girl, in a marsh near the lake. According to a coroner's inquest filed on February 17, 1972, the skull found in the lake was determined via dental records to have belonged to Shaw. Additionally, a crucifix found wrapped around the jawbone of the skull was identified by Shaw's mother to have belonged to her daughter. The other body found in the marsh was positively identified as Johnson.

== Investigation ==
=== Michael Lloyd Self ===
In May 1972, a tip was received from Glenn Price, a Galveston city councilman, to look into Michael Lloyd Self, a local gas station attendant. Police visited Self at his workplace and he voluntarily went to the station the following day for questioning.

According to Self, Police Chief Donald Morris held him in confinement for hours, remarking that Self would not leave until he had made a confession. Self also stated that he was held against a wall, hit with a nightstick, and taunted by Morris with his pistol, who threatened to kill Self if he did not confess. Self eventually agreed, and was forced by Morris to handwrite a confession to the murders of Shaw and Johnson. Morris allegedly forced Self to rewrite the confession several times. Dave Coburn, a local investigator, corroborated Self's story by claiming to have witnessed Morris treat a prisoner exactly the same way a year prior.

The final signed confession by Self contained several discrepancies. Self stated he had dumped Shaw's and Johnson's bodies in El Lago, which was over twenty miles from the marsh where police discovered the remains. Self also wrote that he had strangled both girls to death, though reports from the medical examiner showed no evidence of strangulation.

Three days after his confession, on June 23, 1972, he provided further details to the police in an oral confession that conflicted with his initial written confession. In an interview with Deputy Sheriff W.A. Turner and Deputy Sheriff Frank Beamer, Self claimed that he had picked up Shaw and Johnson from a Sizzler steakhouse and that they had driven around El Lago and gotten food from a local Jack in the Box restaurant. According to Beamer, Self said he then pulled over into a secluded area, struck the girls over the head with a Coca-Cola bottle, stripped their clothes off, and threw the clothes onto the highway. (This last claim conflicted with the fact that the girls' clothing was discovered with their remains.) Self then claimed to have thrown the girls' bodies in a culvert on Choate Road.

=== Conviction and aftermath ===
Self's trial began on May 15, 1973, and concluded on September 18, 1974. He was convicted of the first-degree murder of Shaw and sentenced to life imprisonment. He was not convicted of Johnson's murder. An October 9, 1974, appeal of the case was denied.

Three years later, in 1976, Morris and Deputy Tommy Deal, both of whom had worked on Self's case, were arrested and charged with multiple bank robberies dating back to 1972. Morris was sentenced to 55 years in prison, and Deal was sentenced to 30 years.

Self was denied parole numerous times, and he unsuccessfully appealed his conviction over the course of his sentence. In a September 22, 1992, written petition for appeal, reference to coercion in his confession was made, reading:

The district court acknowledged that the state court had twice found that no force or threats were used against Self to obtain his June 9 confession. Nevertheless, it found that the confession was so obtained and not freely given, despite Miranda warnings having been given. This finding is influenced by its earlier, unwarranted, sua sponte illegal arrest ruling, as well as by credibility choices contrary to those made by the state trial judge, who had an opportunity to observe the witnesses' demeanor, and whose province included weighing conflicting testimony.

Self was refused a new trial by the United States Supreme Court in 1993, thus exhausting his appeals. He died in prison of cancer in 2000. In 2011, the Houston Chronicle published an article in which Self's attorneys stated their belief that he was wrongly accused and coerced into making a false confession. The article also noted that two investigators, a Galveston police officer and a former Harris County prosecutor, also believed Self had been wrongly convicted.

== Other confessions ==
On April 2, 1980, a man in Taylor Lake Village walked into the local police department and claimed to have been responsible for the murders. In his confession, the man allegedly mentioned having tied the girls down with electrical cord, a detail that had not been released to the public, nor ever mentioned by Michael Self. The man, apparently suffering from psychosis, was eventually dismissed by police despite his mention of the electrical cord, as well as the fact that he lived in close proximity to one of the victims.

=== Edward Harold Bell ===
In 1998, Edward Harold Bell wrote multiple letters to prosecutors in Galveston and Harris counties, confessing to the murders of numerous young women. At the time, Bell was serving a seventy-year sentence for the 1978 murder of a 26-year-old Pasadena resident who had attempted to stop him from publicly masturbating in front of a group of teenage girls.

In August 2015, Bell admitted to murdering a total of eleven girls, whom he referred to as the "eleven that went to Heaven", and claimed to have been brainwashed and forced to kill by a secret organization. He named Shaw and Johnson among the girls he admitted to murdering; however, Bell was never charged in the murders of either Shaw or Johnson. On April 20, 2019, Bell died in prison at the age of 82.

== See also ==
- List of murdered American children
- List of solved missing person cases: 1950–1999
- List of unsolved murders (1900–1979)
- List of wrongful convictions in the United States
