= Ted Bell (footballer) =

English footballer

Personal information
- Full name: Edward Bell
- Date of birth: 23 December 1883
- Place of birth: Burnopfield, England
- Height: 5 ft 10 in (1.78 m)
- Position: Full-back

Senior career*
Years	Team	Apps	(Gls)
1902–1903	West Stanley		
1903–1904	Bishop Auckland		
1904–1905	Seaham White Star		
1905–1908	Sunderland	19	(0)
1908–19??	Spennymoor United		
- * Club domestic league appearances and goals

Edward Bell (born 23 December 1883) was an English professional footballer who played as a full-back for Sunderland.
