= Edward Bell (singer/songwriter) =

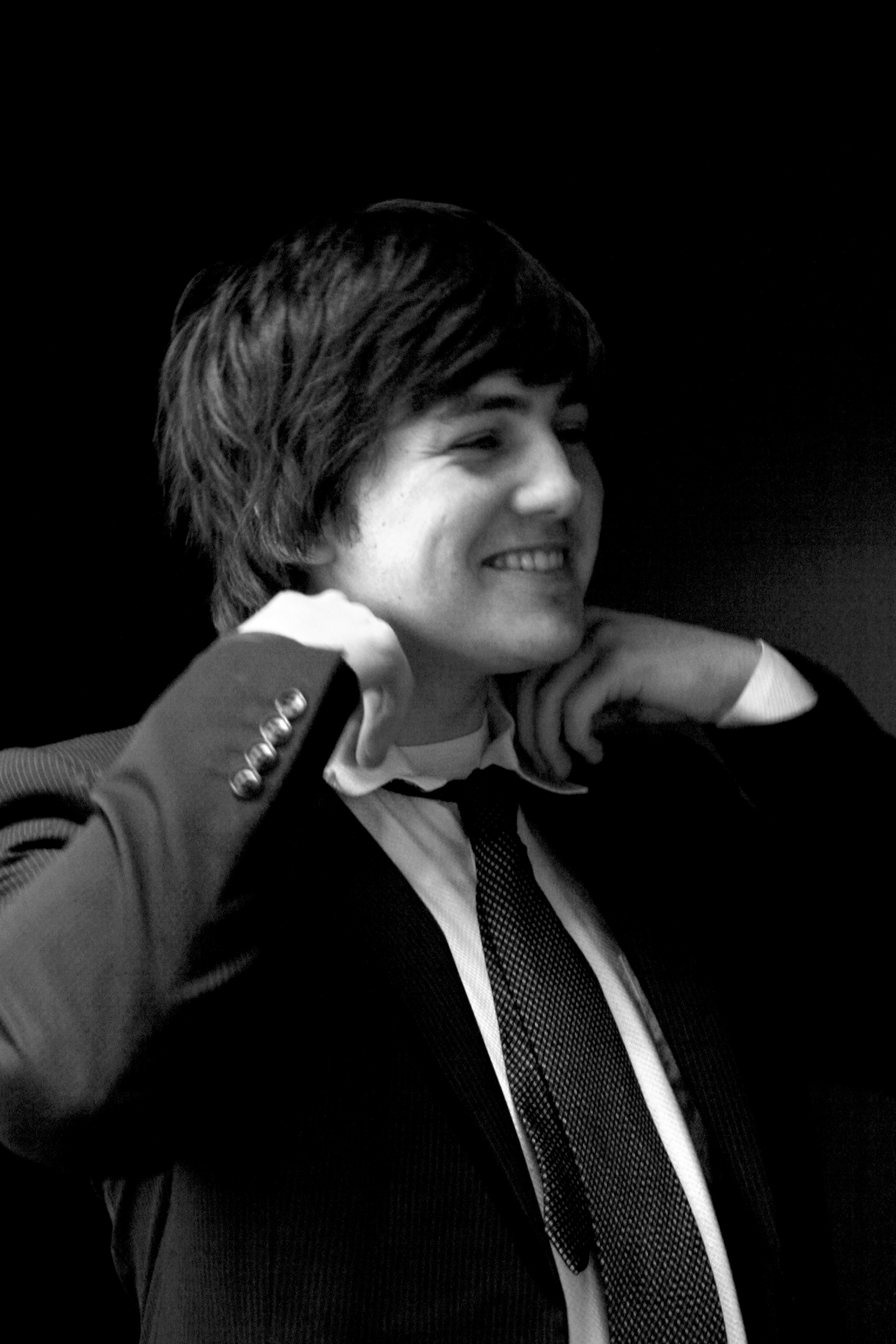

Background information
- Born: 7 September 1987 (age 39); Windsor, Berkshire, England
- Genres: Pop, soft rock, acoustic music
- Occupation: Singer-songwriter
- Instruments: Vocals, piano, violin

Edward Bell (born 7 September 1987, Windsor, Berkshire, England) is an English singer-songwriter, who has been active since 2003.

== Life and career ==
Bell became a probationer at St George's Chapel, Windsor Castle in 1995, and was surpliced in 1996. A regular soloist from 1999 onwards, his first solo was "Domine Deus" from Vivaldi's Gloria, performed in front of Princess Alexandra for the Rose Trust. Highlights at Windsor included singing with José Carreras, Mark Dobell and Joanne Lunn.

On leaving St George's School in 2001, he was offered a Major Music Scholarship to Abingdon School, but decided instead to take up an academic scholarship, and a music scholarship at St Edward's School, Oxford. While in Oxford, he was offered the opportunity to sing with The Sixteen, Henry Herford, and as a part-time tenor for the Keble College Choir, Oxford under Simon Whalley. In 2005, Bell starred opposite the actor, Pippa Bennett-Warner, in a five show production of Les Misérables as Jean Valjean.

On leaving Oxford in 2006, Bell joined a band, signed to Universal Records. He left the band after a year to pursue a degree in music, resulting in studying in London, taking instruction at Guildhall School of Music and Drama for some of his course.

As a songwriter, Bell has enjoyed success with his music played on BBC Radio Berkshire, Time 106.6, and most recently used his song "Two Continents" in the American-produced independent film, Descansos.

On 16 May 2009, he was awarded £15,000 to record his debut album through financing website Slicethepie.com, the youngest person to do so. He followed a group of musicians including; The Alps, Lights Action, and Walk.Dontwalk. He was working on the album with Richard Causon who has worked with the Kings of Leon and Ryan Adams.

In 2012, he was invited to play keyboards and backing vocals for Mike Marlin on the Stranglers UK and Europe tour. Following this he was asked to play at the 2012 Summer Olympics in London for Emerging Icons, featuring the best of unsigned British talent.
