= Laura Recovery Center =

American non-profit organization

The Laura Recovery Center (LRC) is a non-profit organization that worked to prevent kidnappings and abductions and to recover victims of such events. The center was located in Friendswood, Texas, and was named for Laura Kate Smither (April 23, 1984 – April 3, 1997), a 12-year-old girl who was abducted near her Friendswood home and murdered.

== History ==
The center was established by Smither's parents, Bob and Gay Smither, in April 1998 in response to their daughter's murder. On April 3, 1997, Laura Smither was abducted near her home while she was jogging. After her disappearance, more than 6,000 volunteers searched over 800 square miles (2,000 km^{2}). Her body was discovered seventeen days later, on April 20, in a regional water retention pond ten miles from her home. In 2016, William Lewis Reece was indicted on charges of murdering Smither, and other missing Texas girls, and in 2022 he was sentenced to life in prison. He had previously been sentenced to death for the murder of Tiffany Johnston in Oklahoma.

In 2010, the center announced a need for more funding in order to keep operating. The center originally focused on education, training law enforcement and organized community searches related to child abduction and child safety.

As of 2013, the LRC was no longer active in recovering missing children. The change coincided with the retirement of Bob Walcutt, the center's executive director. During its time working on missing children's case, center participated over 100 active searches, and helped with more than 1,700 cases. As of 2021, they were continuing with training law enforcement on organizing community resources.

== Searches ==
The Laura Recovery Center organized numerous community led searches for abducted children, including those for Danielle van Dam and Morgan Harrington. The search for van Dam in 2002 was the group's first out-of-state effort and was one of the largest volunteer search efforts in Californian history, with hundreds of volunteers searching deserts, highways and remote areas for weeks. A volunteer party organized by the Center found her body.
