= Crime Scene: The Vanishing at the Cecil Hotel =

2021 documentary television series

- Promotional poster
- Genre: Documentary
- Directed by: Joe Berlinger
- Starring: Viveca Chow; Judy Ho; Artemis Snow
- Composer: Wendy Blackstone
- Country of origin: United States
- Original languages: English; Spanish
- No. of seasons: 1
- No. of episodes: 4

Production
- Executive producers: Joe Berlinger; Ron Howard; Brian Grazer; Sara Bernstein; Justin Wilkes; Jon Doran; Jon Kamen; Ryan Miller
- Producer: Graham Riske
- Cinematography: Jeff Hutchens
- Running time: 51–58 minutes
- Production companies: Imagine Documentaries; RadicalMedia; Third Eye Motion Picture Company

Original release
- Network: Netflix
- Release: February 10, 2021

Crime Scene: The Vanishing at the Cecil Hotel is the first season of the Crime Scene docuseries. Released in 2021 and directed by Joe Berlinger, it chronicles the death of Elisa Lam at the Cecil Hotel. It features Viveca Chow, Judy Ho and Artemis Snow and premiered on February 10, 2021 on Netflix.

== Interviewees ==
- Viveca Chow
- Kim Cooper
- Josh Dean
- Judy Ho
- Greg Kading
- Santiago Lopez
- John Lordan
- John Sobhani
- Tim Marcia
- Doug Mungin
- Amy Price
- Artemis Snow
- Jason Tovar
- Morbid Blackstar (Pablo Vergara)
- Jim McSorley

== Episodes ==
No.	Title	Original release date
1	"Lost in Los Angeles"	February 10, 2021
2	"Secrets of the Cecil"	February 10, 2021
3	"Down the Rabbit Hole"	February 10, 2021
4	"The Hard Truth"	February 10, 2021

== Release ==
Crime Scene: The Vanishing at the Cecil Hotel was released on February 10, 2021, on Netflix.

== Reception ==
On review aggregator Rotten Tomatoes, the series holds an approval rating of 54% based on 26 critic reviews, with an average rating of 5.30/10. The website's critics' consensus reads, "A sad story poorly told, Vanishing at the Cecil Hotel buries the heart of its tragic case under unsavory conspiracy theories and tasteless reenactments." On Metacritic, it has a weighted average score of 53 out of 100, based on nine critics, indicating "mixed or average" reviews.

== Questions ==
Writing for Insider, Libby Torres pointed out seven questions that the documentary left after claiming that the mystery was solved. Among them, the fact that it was not identified who edited the video of Elisa in the elevator (which has signs of tampering); the police went with sniffer dogs to the place where Elisa's body was, but they didn't find it; the hotel did nothing after receiving the information that Elisa was exhibiting strange behavior: "In the show, the hotel's former manager, Amy Price, explains that bizarre behavior was par for the course at the hotel, which has housed drug addicts, mentally ill people, and sex workers throughout the years. Price essentially tells producers that while Lam's behavior was odd, it didn't merit any special attention. As a viewer, though, it's hard not to wonder why the hotel didn't do more to help and whether or not assisting Lam could have prevented her death."
