= Edward Harold Bell =

American murderer, sex offender, and self-confessed serial killer

- 1978 mug shot of Bell
- Born: May 26, 1939; Texas, U.S.
- Died: April 20, 2019 (aged 79); Wallace Pack Unit, Navasota, Texas, U.S.
- Other names: Cecil Boyd "Wally" "Butch"
- Convictions: Murder x1 Numerous sex offences
- Penalty: 70 years imprisonment

Details
- Victims: 1–16
- Span of crimes: 1978; 1971 – 1992 (suspected)
- Country: United States; Panama (possibly)
- States: Texas (confirmed); Chiriquí, Panamá (suspected)
- Date apprehended: February 14, 1993

Edward Harold Bell (May 26, 1939 – April 20, 2019) was an American sex offender, murderer and the first fugitive to be featured in the Texan rendition of America's Most Wanted. Following his capture in Panama City, Panama, in 1993, he was extradited, convicted and sentenced to a 70-year term for the murder of a Marine in 1978, and later confessed to killing eleven girls during the 1970s. His claims were never conclusively verified, and he died behind bars in 2019, having recanted his previous claims.

== Early life and crimes ==
Edward Harold Bell was born on May 26, 1939, in southern Texas. According to his claims, his father, an oil field worker, frequently moved the family to various towns surrounding the Houston area. Bell allegedly suffered physical abuse both from him, his scoutmasters at the Boy Scouts and one of his cousins. Bell would also claim in later interviews that his father encouraged him to do violent crime, ranging from robbing banks and raping girls, in addition to encouraging him to kill himself.

In spite of these claims, Bell's life was considered enviable by family and friends alike, as he graduated from the Columbus High School in Columbus and later earned a physical education degree at the Texas A&M University in College Station, where he also played in the university's Aggie Band. After graduation, he found work as a licensed diver and married his first wife in San Marcos, with the newlyweds then moving to western Texas, where they had three children. After living on a ranch in Terlingua for some time, Bell, who worked as an itinerant pharmaceutical salesman, sold the ranch for an office in downtown Houston.

In 1966, Bell was arrested for exposing himself to a pair of little girls in Sudan, for which he was interned at the Big Spring State Psychiatric Hospital. After spending some time in treatment, he was released, only to be rearrested for a similar charge in 1969 after he exposed himself to the 13-year-old daughter of a Lubbock policeman.

In order to avoid prosecution, he was interned at the University of Texas Medical Branch for further treatment, where he continued to make inappropriate sexual advances toward underage patients. By the time of his release, now divorced and forbidden contact with his children, Bell married a 17-year-old female patient and the pair moved to a beach house in Galveston. There, he became acquainted with Doug Pruns, a surfer who made custom boards out of his shop based in the area, who allowed him to become a silent partner in the business, despite his reservations about his friend's behavior. Through the mid-to-late 1970s, Bell was repeatedly arrested for exposing himself and masturbating in front of young girls in Lubbock, Pasadena, Plainview, Bacliff, Houston and Gretna, Louisiana, but was either never charged or the cases were dropped altogether.

== Murder of Larry Dickens and escape ==
On August 24, 1978, while driving his red and white GMC truck around Pasadena, Bell stopped in front of a group of young girls, pulled down his pants and began masturbating in front of them. His actions caught the attention of 26-year-old Larry Dean Dickens, a Marine with a young daughter, who rushed in and got hold of the man's keys in an attempt to prevent him from fleeing. Suddenly, Bell pulled out a pistol and shot Dickens, who staggered into his mother's garage and collapsed onto the floor in front of his horrified mother, who had watched the whole ordeal from inside the house. While she was trying to calm Dickens down, Bell grabbed a rifle from his truck, went up to the wounded man and shot him in the forehead before fleeing. He was caught by police shortly afterwards and released to await trial on a $125,000 bail bond; however, when the trial date came about, Bell did not appear and was designated as wanted fugitive.

For the next fourteen years, Bell travelled around various locations in Mexico and Central America using a sailboat, posing as a dead cousin named Cecil Boyd. Throughout this time, he made a living through giving dive trips to American tourists and gold panning. In 1985 he was named as Texas' most wanted fugitive, bringing further attention to his case and reinvigorating the search for him. After spending time in Costa Rica in 1988 and 1989, Bell moved for a few months in Boquete, Panama, before finally settling in Panama City, where he married for the third time to a young girl from Chepo. At this time, it was reported that he worked at a dock in the port town of Cristóbal.

== Arrest, trial and imprisonment ==
On December 2, 1992, the television show Unsolved Mysteries aired an episode about the murder of Dickens played by a then unknown Matthew McConaughey. After the airing of the episode a man recognized Bell as someone he had recently conducted business with in Panama City. On February 14, 1993, a joint operation conducted by the FBI and the Panamanian National Police led to Bell's arrest at a yacht club in Panama City. At his June trial, Bell's attorneys attempted to argue that the killing was done in self-defense, claiming that Dickens was an "unstable" man who had threatened to kill him in the name of Jesus. This argument was disproven, and Bell was subsequently convicted and sentenced to 70 years imprisonment. After his sentencing, Bell claimed he had quit being a "flasher" while in Panama, but expressed regret that he had not done so earlier so that Dickens’ life could be spared.

== Confessions and suspicions ==
Bell is considered a suspect in the murders of several young women near Galveston in the 1970s. He is also a suspect in the 1971 murders of Rhonda Johnson and Sharon Shaw. In 1998, Bell wrote several letters to prosecutors in both Galveston and Harris counties, claiming that he had killed seven teenage girls in their jurisdictions between 1971 and 1977. Despite these gruesome claims, the letters were "kept secret" until 2011, when they were finally revealed by retired Galveston homicide detective Fred Paige to the public in an attempt to uncover any potential leads that could verify Bell's accounts.

In interviews with the Houston Chronicle, Bell claimed to have been "brainwashed" into committing a total of eleven Texas murders in two waves, killing five in 1971 and six more between 1974 and 1977. In these "program" killings as he called them, Bell claimed to have committed three separate double-murders, naming Debbie Ackerman and Maria Johnson who disappeared on Nov. 15, 1971, approximately three months after the murders of Johnson and Shaw. While Bell did not name Johnson and Shaw by name, he stated that he had killed a pair of Webster girls. Johnson and Shaw, who attended the same dive school near Bell's apartment as Ackerman and Johnson, were both from Webster. Bell claimed that his final double murder occurred during his second wave of murders in Dickinson, where he owned a small pasture. Middle-schoolers Georgia Geer and Brooks Bracewell disappeared from Dickinson on Sept. 6, 1974, their bodies being discovered in a bayou in 1976. Bell additionally claimed responsibility for the 1971 murder of Colette Anise Wilson who disappeared on June 17. Her bones were found in a reservoir in Houston on November 26, intermingled with those of Gloria Ann Gonzales, who disappeared on October 28. Bell named one more victim, Kimberly Rae Pitchford, although she was murdered in January 1973 and not 1974 as claimed by Bell. The three additional unnamed victims claimed by Bell as part of his latter series included two additional teens from Houston and a hitchiker on FM 2004 near Santa Fe.

His revelations were met with mixed feelings by some of the victims' family members, who were left unsure whether the killer was being genuine or was just using a ploy, due to his requirement that he be given legal immunity in exchange for a full confession. On the other hand, other family members and some investigators considered the claims to be credible, as Bell's criminal past, proximity to the crime scenes at the right dates and mentioning details not known to the public made him a viable suspect in their eyes. In addition to this, Panamanian authorities announced that they considered him a suspect in four rape-murders committed in their country: two while he was residing in Boquete, and another two in Panama City.

== Death ==
Despite several investigations into his claims, Bell was only charged with the murder of Larry Dickens. On April 20, 2019, he died from heart failure at the Wallace Pack Unit, aged 79. His death was met with relief from both Dickens' and the other victims' family members, who believed that he was responsible for the deaths of their loved ones.

== See also ==
- Texas Killing Fields
