= Jessica Dimmock =

American photographer

Jessica Dimmock (born June 23, 1978) is a documentary photojournalist and filmmaker based in Brooklyn, New York City. Her body of work, The Ninth Floor, documented the lives of a group of young heroin users over the course of several years.

== Education and career ==
Dimmock is a 2005 graduate of the program in documentary photography and photojournalism at the International Center of Photography. She shoots regularly for the New York Times Magazine, Fortune, Newsweek and other U.S. magazines. She has been profiled in New York magazine, Aperture, Photo District News, and the British Journal of Photography. She is a member of VII Photo Agency.

She began her "Ninth Floor" project in late 2004 in Manhattan. A drug dealer noticed her camera, approached her on the street, and invited her to take photographs of him. He led Dimmock to a building in the Flatiron District, where Dimmock spent eight months photographing the approximately 30 heroin addicts who shared an apartment. In June 2005, the owners of the apartment evicted the addicts, but Dimmock continued to photograph two of the couples for more than two years after the eviction. The project was published as a video and as a book in 2007.

== Publications ==
=== Publications by Dimmock ===
- The Ninth Floor. Rome: Contrasto, 2007.

=== Publications with contributions by Dimmock ===
- American Photography 22. AI-AP, 2006.
- Flash Forward. Toronto: Magenta Foundation, 2006.
- This Day of Change. Tokyo: Kodansha, 2009.
- A New American Photographic Dream. Milan: Silvana, 2010.

== Films ==
- Jessica Dimmock: The Ninth Floor (2007) – video
- Paparazzi (2010) – short film
- Wait for Me (2011) – music video
- Without (2011) – documentary feature film, producer, cinematographer
- The Pearl - documentary feature; co-director, cinematographer
- The Convention – documentary short film; producer, director, cinematographer
- Crime Scene: The Texas Killing Fields - Netflix limited docuseries; director
- Captive Audience (2022) – docuseries; director
- Thoughts & Prayers (2025) - documentary feature film, director, producer
- Maternal Instinct (2026) – Netflix documentary; director

== Exhibitions ==
- 2008: The Ninth Floor, Foley Gallery, New York City
- 2008: The Ninth Floor, Randall Scott Gallery, Washington, DC
- 2008: Under Influence - Intoxication and Drugs in Contemporary Art (group show), Kunsthaus Dresden, Germany
- 2008: Dispatches From the Frontlines (group show), Fovea Exhibitions, Beacon, New York
- 2008: The Ninth Floor, Foam Fotografiemuseum Amsterdam
- 2009: The Ninth Floor, Locuslux Gallery, Belgium
- 2009: The Ninth Floor, International Documentary Film Festival Amsterdam
- 2009: Viewing Restricted: [Re]presenting Poverty (group show), London School of Economics, London
- 2010: The Brothel Without Walls (group show), University of Toronto Art Centre for the Scotiabank Contact Photography Festival, Toronto

== Awards ==
- 2006: Magnum Photos' Inge Morath Award for Photojournalism
- 2006: F Award, Fabrica Forma Fotografia
- 2008: New York Photo Award in "multimedia photo/audio" category
- 2010: Finalist, Best Photography Book Award, Sixty-Seventh Annual Pictures of the Year International Competition
- 2016: Grand Jury Prize for Best Documentary Feature, Dallas International Film Festival, with Christopher LaMarca for The Pearl
- 2017: Third prize, Long Form category, World Press Photo, for The Convention
