= Ed Bell (American football) =

American football player (1921–1990)

Edward Bell
- Bell in 1946

No. 46, 82
- Positions: Guard, tackle

Personal information
- Born: September 20, 1921; Chicago, Illinois, U.S.
- Died: December 6, 1990 (aged 69); South Bend, Indiana, U.S.
- Listed height: 6 ft 1 in (1.85 m)
- Listed weight: 227 lb (103 kg)

Career information
- High school: Austin (Chicago, Illinois)
- College: Indiana University

Career history
- Miami Seahawks (1946); Green Bay Packers (1947–1949)

Career AAFC + NFL statistics
- Games played: 42
- Starts: 1
- Stats at Pro Football Reference

Edward Bell (September 20, 1921 – December 6, 1990) was an American guard and tackle in the National Football League.

== Biography ==
Bell was born in Chicago, Illinois.

== Career ==
Bell's first professional experience was with the Miami Seahawks of the All-America Football Conference. Following his time there, he played with the Green Bay Packers for three seasons.

He played at the collegiate level at Indiana University.
