= RadicalMedia =

American media and production company

RadicalMedia, LLC
- Industry: Media production
- Founded: 1993; 33 years ago
- Founder: Jon Kamen; Frank Scherma
- Headquarters: New York City, with offices in Los Angeles, London, Berlin, and Shanghai,
- Area served: Worldwide
- Website: radicalmedia.com

RadicalMedia, LLC is an American independent media and creative production company. Founded by Jon Kamen and Frank Scherma, the company had developed film, television, and branded content.

In 2010, Fremantle purchased a 60 percent stake in the company. In 2015, RadicalMedia bought back the company's shares, retaining its majority ownership.

== Entertainment ==
Company's projects include the Emmy-winning David Byrne's American Utopia and Spring Awakening: Those You've Known; the Tony Award-winning musical Come From Away; the series Crime Scene, Jeffrey Epstein: Filthy Rich, and Conversations with a Killer; and Doris Kearns Goodwin's Abraham Lincoln and Theodore Roosevelt on History Channel.

RadicalMedia produced Concert for George; Metallica: Some Kind of Monster on Metallica, the pilot episode of Mad Men; and the A&E documentary Under African Skies on Paul Simon's Graceland journey directed by Joe Berlinger. The company also produced Ron Howard's documentary Made in America; the docu-series Abstract: The Art of Design, Oh, Hello on Broadway, Bobby Kennedy for President, and My Next Guest Needs No Introduction with David Letterman; and Hamilton's America, a documentary about Lin-Manuel Miranda's Broadway musical, Hamilton.

The company had shot three performances of shows with the original principal cast at the Richard Rodgers Theatre in New York City during a week in the summer of 2016. That footage was edited together into a full-length film recording of the musical, which was then offered for bidding to major film studios. Eventually, the distribution rights were purchased by Walt Disney Studios on February 3, 2020, for a total of $75 million.

In July 2012, RadicalMedia launched THNKR, the company's YouTube channel.

== Branded entertainment ==
RadicalMedia also produces brand-driven entertainment for its partners and advertisers. Productions include Nike Battlegrounds, a 3-season street basketball competition series. Iconoclasts, a series featuring unscripted encounters with cultural figures, was produced by RadicalMedia for the Sundance Channel in partnership with Grey Goose Entertainment. In 2007, the company also worked with BBH to develop and produce the MTV-scripted reality dating series The Gamekillers, which was sponsored by Axe deodorant. In 2011, RadicalMedia and Ogilvy & Mather produced a short documentary series for IBM, "Watson". In 2012, RadicalMedia won three Cannes Lions for "GT Academy" for Speed.

== Music videos ==
In 2010, the company produced "The Johnny Cash Project", a crowd-sourced music video of Johnny Cash's Ain't No Grave, directed by Chris Milk. The music video received multiple awards.

Other productions include the Major Lazer document "Chasing the Sound" following the trio's tour through West Africa; the visuals for every track on Orville Peck's album Bronco and previous single "Queen of the Rodeo"; Tom Misch's video for "What Kinda Music"; Lil Xan and Charli XCX's video for "Moonlight"; Sia's video for "Rainbow"; and Katy Perry and Nicki Minaj's music video for "Swish".

== Controversy ==
In April 2011, the company took legal action to prevent a collective of radical media organizations from using the trademarked phrase "radical media" to promote their upcoming Radical Media Conference in London, which was consequently renamed to the Rebellious Media Conference. On May 3, 2011, a group held a demonstration outside RadicalMedia's London offices. Protester Ewa Jasiewicz said the company had "locked off the term 'radical media' away from anybody else using it, including activists who really do make radical media".
