= Imagine Entertainment =

American film and television production company

- Logo used since 2020
- Type: Private
- Industry: Film; Television
- Predecessor: Imagine Films Entertainment; Major H Productions; Brian Grazer Productions
- Founded: November 1985; 41 years ago
- Founder: Brian Grazer; Ron Howard
- Headquarters: 150 South El Camino Drive, Beverly Hills, California, United States
- Area served: Worldwide
- Key people: Brian Grazer (chairman); Ron Howard (chairman); Justin Wilkes (president)
- Products: Feature films; Television series; Documentaries; Branded content; Podcasts
- Owners: Brian Grazer; Ron Howard
- Divisions: Imagine Features; Imagine Television Studios; Imagine Documentaries; Imagine Branded Entertainment; Imagine Kids+Family; Imagine Audio
- Subsidiaries: Jax Media; Jigsaw Productions; Marginal Mediaworks
- Website: imagine-entertainment.com

Imagine Entertainment, formerly Imagine Films Entertainment, also known simply as Imagine (stylized in all caps as IMAGINE), is an American film and television production company founded in November 1985 by producer Brian Grazer and director Ron Howard. The feature-film division has participated in over sixty productions and is associated with Universal Pictures, which has distributed many of Imagine's productions, some with other studios.

Erica Huggins was hired as senior vice president of motion picture production and was elevated to executive vice president in 2006, and later to co-president of production in 2010. Its television division, Imagine Television Studios (formerly Imagine Television), was also founded in November 1985 by Grazer and Howard, around the same time when the company was founded. It has participated in at least twenty productions and has been frequently associated with 20th Century Fox Television.

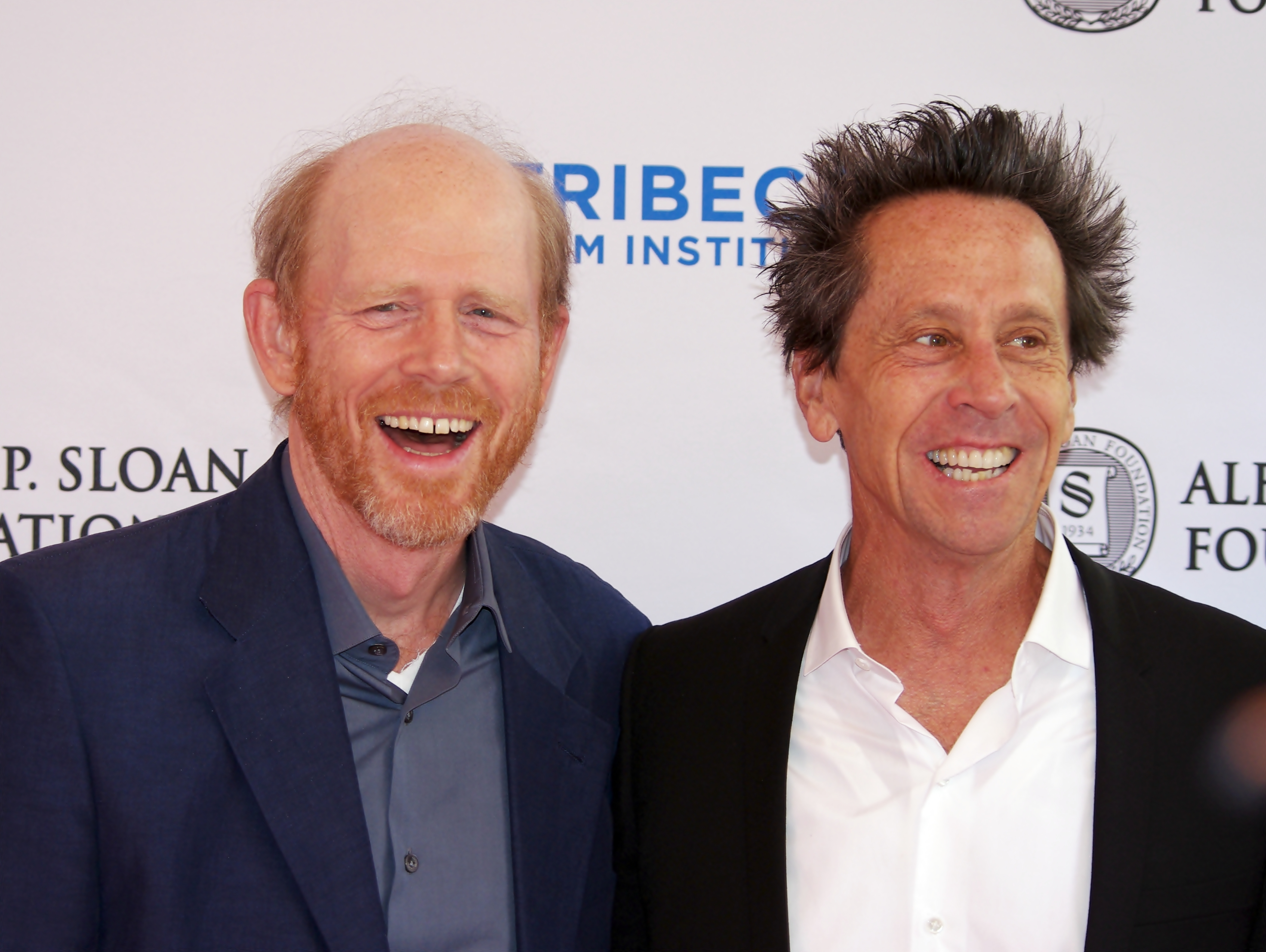
Co-founders Ron Howard and Brian Grazer at a Tribeca Film Festival panel on A Beautiful Mind

== History ==
=== Background ===
Brian Grazer and Ron Howard met in 1982 on Night Shift, with Howard directing and Grazer co-producing. They followed it up by working on 1984's Splash.

=== Imagine Films Entertainment ===
Logo from 1985 until 2020

The company was originally founded in November 1985, following the success of the motion picture Splash. It was originated from a merger of two production companies, Ron Howard's Major H Productions and Brian Grazer's self-titled production company Brian Grazer Productions. The company went public the following year. At first, the company set a deal with Tri-Star Pictures to produce feature films and television shows. Imagine granted Tri-Star the right of first refusal to syndicate their off-network shows produced by Imagine. Its offering was sold to Allen & Co. for 1,667,000 units for common stock and warrant it to purchase additional one-third of its stock. The net proceeds were used for development and production of theatrical films, television series, mini-series and made for television movies, although "the company does not presently intend to develop game shows or daytime soap operas." Imagine however has its prospectus having negotiations with Paramount Television for a commitment with ABC for a half-hour pilot and five episodes based on the comedy film Gung Ho.

Later the same year, Imagine had a five-year deal with Showtime/The Movie Channel, Inc. and it was able to develop projects for the channels Showtime and The Movie Channel. The agreement would kick-off with 1989 pay television availabilities and include pay-per view exhibition rights to all Imagine-produced films and about 30 motion pictures and "an unspecified number of original products" are also covered by the agreement. "There was the option of developing "long-form dramas" or series as part of the original material to be developed and aired exclusively on Showtime, adding that it could also acquire the syndication rights to these films and original products.

In April 1987, producers Philip and Mary Ann Hobel had inked a pact with Imagine Films Entertainment to develop and produce theatrical fare for the company through Hobel Productions, and expected to serve as the eyes and ears of Imagine of New York, and will be backed by a development fund for the purchase of books, plays, scripts and ideas to be developed as film projects, and plans to do both comedy and drama projects with a concentration on contempo themes and issues through a first-look agreement.

On July 29, 1987, Tri-Star Pictures and Imagine Films Entertainment announced the termination of obligations by Imagine to offer Tri-Star distribution rights for all of its television programming and feature films. Imagine, which received more than $1.7 million from Tri-Star, made a $1.3 million payment to Tri-Star, the companies said and advances from Tri-Star were eliminated. The companies said they "intend[ed] to work together on a project-by-project basis" and that projects already in development were not affected. Imagine said the modified agreement "provide[d] it with the flexibility to pursue certain financing and distribution opportunities which were not anticipated when the companies entered the original agreement."

In November 1987, Imagine Films Entertainment announced its plans to move its financial and administrative activities from New York City to Los Angeles, and Neil Braun, who was president and chief-executive officer of the company would not be part of the move, and instead would leave the company and is expected to reveal of his plans shortly and his personal commitments would keep him from making the shift, but he called the consolidation "the right decision for the company" while expressing his disappointment at not being able to stay on.

On December 1, 1987, the company sealed a production and distribution deal with Universal Pictures via a "long-term multiple picture agreement" that they distributed Imagine's films for three to five films a year and the agreement "contemplates the possibility" that Universal acquired a 20% share in Imagine and it ran through November 1992 for financing 50% of 30 films. Imagine had an IPO in 1986 at $8 for a package of one share and one warrant. Shares rose to $19.25 before falling in the stock market crash in 1987 to $2.25. In the summer of next year, Imagine struck a deal with MCA TV to handle distribution of its television material. MCA and Imagine had a joint television venture which MCA had the exclusive network and home video distribution rights. Imagine retained domestic distribution rights for now and was banking on those rights becoming more valuable in the future as its theatrical and television programs gained exposure. Imagine's television division focused on half-hour comedies, whereas MCA focused on one-hour programs for the networks.

In September 1988, Robert Harris who was an employee of MCA, and president of Universal Television Group joined the company as president of motion pictures and television. Harris said the studio was also taking original feature cable projects with Showtime, HBO, TNT, USA and MTV Network (which includes Nickelodeon and VH-1, in addition to projects with on-air networks).

On May 29, 1989, Imagine and Central Independent Television signed a deal to make television films for the worldwide business. Under the deal, the new joint venture would produce between four and six television films and mini-series a year. MCA who owned about 20% of Imagine and had worldwide distribution rights to its television series as well as to its long-form programs on a project-by-project basis would also have first consideration on international distribution rights to the joint venture's programs. Imagine and Central retained rights in the United States and United Kingdom, respectively. The Imagine-Central joint venture was separate from MCA's own ongoing exploration of a joint venture with a European company for Europe-based long-form co-production. The company was in discussions with two or three potential partners, but a deal was not expected soon. Its projects required U.S. and UK presales to go forward, although the venture intended to seek U.S. buyers going beyond the three big commercial networks to include Fox, as well as cable networks TNT, USA Network, Showtime and HBO. The deal also allowed for theatrical distribution, although such co-productions were not in the planning.

Imagine and Second City signed a joint venture deal in May 1989. In September 1989, Imagine is entering syndication production business and signed a long-term co-production deal with Second City Entertainment, for a late night talk/comedy strip that was distributed by MCA TV. It used the ready talent pool of Second City comedians. The result was My Talk Show, which aired in the 1990–91 season. As HA!: The Comedy Network is ready to air in 1990, they stuck deals with Imagine Films Entertainment, for series featuring the Second City Repertory Company, as well as MTM Enterprises.

In 1990, Imagine Films Entertainment launched a brand new family film label Imagine Family Films, designed to compete with Disney for a family film audience, in order to produce G-rated and PG-rated feature films, and has plans to produce three family films per year, with an eye on the holiday release schedule. The first film planned to be developed for the branding was a remake of the 1963 family feature film Flipper, and an adaptation of the book series Curious George. Both MCA/Universal and Imagine agreed to an extension that Universal would handle theatrical distribution, network, foreign and home video rights, while Universal Studios Florida handled the theme park rights to the properties that were proposed by Imagine Family Films. The new Imagine Family Films banner was intended to model on the success of Disney, and decided to extend on the natural extension of the wholesome wide appeal fare the company has been using since its founding.

In 1991, Imagine Films Entertainment shut down its original Imagine Television division, and terminating its exclusive production partnership with MCA, Inc., and it laid off 30 of its 80 employees of its company. It came when the series My Talk Show, and Parenthood flopped. Andrew Suskind, Joyce Brotman, Todd Bergesen, Richard Pierson, Judy Ranam and Lisa Bloom left the company.

By May 1992, 48% of the stock was public traded and worth $9.375. The duo agreed to a new six-picture deal with Universal while concurrently offering $9 a share to buy the company's public outstanding share to start a new company with its assets. If not, they planned to leave the company at their contract expiration in November to start the new company anyway. Universal was providing the cash for a buyout of an equity stake in the new company. By January 21, 1993, it approved a $9 share offer made by its founders and co-chief executives, and IFE Acquisition Co. could render the offer for the deal.

=== Imagine Entertainment ===
In early 1997, Imagine Entertainment reopened its television division and signed a deal with Disney for the development of television series, which would expire at the end of 2000. Its film contract remained with Universal. It boosted up their access to Disney's television production slate. Imagine was exclusive for development and production of television projects, including half-hour comedy series, one-hour dramas, motion pictures for television and miniseries. They hired Tony Krantz to be co-chairman of its television division, and it shared a stake in the television division with its founders Brian Grazer and Ron Howard, while overseeing the television division's day-to-day operations.

In 2000, the partnership collaborated with 20th Century Fox Television for development of television series, an agreement which was set to expire at the end of 2016. In 2011, the company had three weak box office performers with The Dilemma, Cowboys & Aliens and Tower Heist. Because of their weak financial pact renewal with Universal in January 2012, Imagine laid off 5 employees, including production executive Jeremy Steckler. This also moved Imagine from exclusive to a first-look deal. By 2013, Imagine was considering other funding methods for the company's films including crowdfunding for a Friday Night Lights film.

In November 2013, Michael Rosenberg was promoted to co-chairman followed in December 2013, with Erica Huggins being promoted to his previous position as president. Industry insiders indicated in late January 2016 that a deal with Raine Group was in the works that would have Raine become a partner of the production company while contributing $100 million. The deal was then confirmed on February 8, 2016.

On April 5, 2017, Imagine signed a six-picture deal with Warner Bros. Pictures and Australian visual effects and animation studio Animal Logic to develop, finance, and produce six animated/live-action films. At the end of July 2017, the company struck a four-year first look co-financing and television production deal with CBS Corporation, which saw the former producing content for the company's CBS and Showtime television networks and CBS All Access SVOD streaming service. The agreement was reached by Grazer and CBS Corporation, then-Chairman and then-CEO Les Moonves.

In February 2018, Imagine acquired a controlling stake in Jax Media. In November that same year, the company also acquired a stake in content studio Marginal Mediaworks founded by CEO Sanjay Sharma.

In June 2020, Imagine Entertainment made a substantial investment in Academy Award-winning filmmaker Alex Gibney's Jigsaw Productions. Gibney formed the New York-based Jigsaw in 2012, and directed and produced Enron: The Smartest Guys in the Room, Taxi to the Dark Side, Going Clear: Scientology and the Prison of Belief, The Inventor: Out for Blood in Silicon Valley, We Steal Secrets: The Story of WikiLeaks, and Citizen K. More recently, the studio signed a first-look deal with Apple Originals.

In January 2023, Imagine Entertainment promoted Justin Wilkes to President of the company. Most recently, the company struck a first-look deal for feature films and documentaries with Amazon Studios.

== Filmography ==
The feature-film division has participated in over sixty productions and is associated with Universal Pictures, which has distributed many of Imagine's productions, some with other studios. Erica Huggins was hired as senior vice president of motion picture production and was elevated to executive vice president in 2006, and later to co-president of production in 2010.

Its television division, Imagine Television Studios (formerly Imagine Television), was founded in November 1985 by Brian Grazer and Ron Howard, around the same time when the company was founded. It has participated in at least twenty productions and has been frequently associated with 20th Century Fox Television.
