= List of Netflix India original programming =

Netflix India is the Indian subsidiary of the American streaming service Netflix. Since its launch in January 2016, it has distributed a number of Indian "originals"—primarily television series, along with miniseries.

Netflix's first original titles for India were the film Love per Square Foot and the series Sacred Games, both released in 2018.

This article lists the Indian original television series produced or distributed by Netflix.

== TV shows ==
=== Scripted ===
Title	Genre	Premiere	Seasons	Length	Language(s)	Status
Sacred Games	Crime thriller	6 July 2018	2 seasons, 16 episodes	43–58 min	Hindi	Pending
Ghoul	Horror	24 August 2018	3 episodes	44–50 min	Hindi / English	Miniseries
Selection Day	Sports drama	28 December 2018	2 parts, 12 episodes	19–28 min	Hindi	Ended
Delhi Crime	Police procedural	22 March 2019	3 season, 18 episodes	45–64 min	Hindi / English	Renewed
Leila	Science fiction drama	14 June 2019	1 season, 6 episodes	40–54 min	Hindi	Ended
Typewriter	Horror	19 July 2019	1 season, 5 episodes	43–52 min	Hindi	Ended
Bard of Blood	Espionage thriller	27 September 2019	1 season, 7 episodes	41–50 min	Hindi	Ended
Jamtara – Sabka Number Ayega	True crime drama	10 January 2020	2 season, 18 episodes	23–49 min	Hindi	Pending
Taj Mahal 1989	Romantic dramedy	14 February 2020	1 season, 7 episodes	31–36 min	Hindi	Ended
She	Crime drama	20 March 2020	2 season, 14 episodes	31–43 min	Hindi	Ended
Hasmukh	Dark comedy	17 April 2020	1 season, 10 episodes	29–39 min	Hindi	Ended
Betaal	Horror/Action thriller	24 May 2020	1 season, 4 episodes	45–49 min	Hindi	Ended
Masaba Masaba	Biographical dramedy	28 August 2020	2 season, 13 episodes	25–34 min	Hindi / English	Ended
Mismatched	Coming-of-age romantic dramedy	20 November 2020	3 seasons, 22 episodes	29–35 min	Hindi / English	Renewed
Bhaag Beanie Bhaag	Romantic comedy	4 December 2020	1 season, 6 episodes	29–35 min	Hindi	Ended
Bombay Begums	Drama	8 March 2021	1 season, 6 episodes	45–61 min	Hindi / English	Ended
Ray	Anthology	25 June 2021	1 season, 4 episodes	52–64 min	Hindi	Ended
Feels Like Ishq	Anthology	23 July 2021	1 season, 6 episodes	25–31 min	Hindi	Ended
Navarasa	Anthology	6 August 2021	1 volume, 9 episodes	28–48 min	Tamil	Ended
Call My Agent: Bollywood	Workplace dramedy	29 October 2021	1 season, 6 episodes	39–49 min	Hindi / English	Ended
Aranyak	Crime thriller	10 December 2021	1 season, 8 episodes	37–48 min	Hindi	Ended
Decoupled	Romantic comedy	17 December 2021	1 season, 8 episodes	25–36 min	English	Ended
Yeh Kaali Kaali Ankhein	Romantic thriller	14 January 2022	2 season, 14 episodes	31–51 min	Hindi	Renewed
The Fame Game	Suspense family drama	25 February 2022	2 season, 14 episodes	44–55 min	Hindi	Ended
Eternally Confused and Eager for Love	Comedy drama	18 March 2022	1 season, 8 episodes	23–25 min	English	Ended
Mai: A Mother's Rage	Crime thriller	15 April 2022	1 season, 6 episodes	42–55 min	Hindi	Renewed
Khakee: The Bihar Chapter	Crime thriller	25 November 2022	1 season, 7 episodes	41–68 min	Hindi	Renewed
CAT	Revenge drama	9 December 2022	1 season, 8 episodes	40–49 min	Punjabi	Pending
Trial by Fire	Crime drama	13 January 2023	1 season, 7 episodes	44–47 min	Hindi	Miniseries
Class	Teen crime thriller	3 February 2023	1 season, 8 episodes	48–58 min	Hindi	Renewed
Rana Naidu	Action crime drama	10 March 2023	1 season, 10 episodes	39–50 min	Hindi	Renewed
Tooth Pari: When Love Bites	Romantic horror comedy	20 April 2023	1 season, 8 episodes	30–45 min	Hindi	Pending
Scoop	True crime drama	2 June 2023	1 season, 6 episodes	52–71 min.	Hindi	Pending
Kohrra	Crime drama	15 July 2023	2 season, 12 episodes	40–50 min.	Punjabi	Renewed
Guns & Gulaabs	Black comedy Crime thriller	18 August 2023	1 season, 7 episodes	45–50 min.	Hindi	Renewed
Choona	Heist Comedy	29 September 2023	1 season, 8 episodes	40-40 min.	Hindi	Pending
Kaala Paani	Drama	18 October 2023	1 season, 7 episodes	50–75 min.	Hindi	Renewed
The Railway Men	Drama	18 November 2023	1 season, 4 episodes	51–65 min.	Hindi	Miniseries
Killer Soup	Dark comedy	11 January 2024	1 season, 8 episodes	43–59 min.	Hindi	Pending
Maamla Legal Hai	Legal Comedy	1 March 2024	2 season, 16 episodes	28–38 min.	Hindi	Renewed
Heeramandi	Historical drama	1 May 2024	1 season, 8 episodes	43–59 min.	Hindi	Renewed
Tribhuvan Mishra: CA Topper	Crime drama	18 July 2024	1 season, 9 episodes	50-60 min.	Hindi	Pending
IC 814: The Kandahar Hijack	Crime drama	29 August 2024	1 season, 6 episodes	40–45 min	Hindi	Miniseries
Black Warrant	Crime drama	10 January 2025	1 season, 7 episodes	38–50 min	Hindi	Pending
Dabba Cartel	Crime drama	28 February, 2025	1 season, 7 episodes	45–50 min	Hindi	Pending
Khakee: The Bengal Chapter	Crime drama	20 March, 2025	1 season, 7 episodes	45–60 min	Hindi	Pending
The Royals	Comedy drama	9 May, 2025	1 season, 8 episodes	39–49 min	Hindi	Renewed
Mandala Murders	Action Crime thriller	25 July, 2025	1 season, 8 episodes	39–49 min	Hindi	Pending
Saare Jahan Se Accha	crime drama	13 August, 2025	1 season, 6 episodes	39–49 min	Hindi	Pending
The Ba***ds of Bollywood	Comedy Action	18 September, 2025	1 season, 7 episodes	39–49 min	Hindi	Pending
The Game: You Never Play Alone	crime thriller	2 October, 2025	1 season, 7 episodes	30–40 min	Tamil	Pending
Single Papa	comedy drama	12 December, 2025	1 season, 6 episodes	32–45 min	Hindi	Pending
Taskaree	crime thriller	14 January 2026	1 season, 7 episodes	38–58 min	Hindi	Pending
Hello Bachhon	drama	6 March 2026	1 season, 5 episodes	44–55 min	Hindi	Pending
Glory	Sport Drama	1 May 2026	1 season, 7 episode	49 – 60 min	Hindi	Pending
Super Subbu	Comedy drama	2 July 2026	1 season, 7 episodes	35 - 45 min	Telugu	Pending
Musafir Cafe	Romantic drama	24 July 2026	1 season, 8 episodes	30–35 min	Hindi	Renewed
Operation Safed Sagar	War drama	7 August 2026	1 season, 6 episodes	50–60 min	Hindi	Pending
Chumbak	Comedy	10 September 2026	1 season, 16 episodes	28–30 min	Hindi	Pending
Shaque: Trust No One	Mystery thriller	24 September 2026	1 season, 7 episodes	50–60 min	Hindi	Pending
#Love	Romance comedy-drama	2 October 2026	1 season, 6 episodes	30- 40 min	Tamil	pending
Matargashti	Comedy-drama	21 October 2026	1 season, 5 episodes	25-30 min	Hindi	Pending
Akka	Crime drama	30 October 2026	1 season, 5 episodes	35-45 min	Hindi	pending
O Saathi Re	Romantic drama	4 December 2026	1 season		Hindi	pending
Awaiting release
Family Business	Drama		1 season		Hindi	pending

=== Unscripted ===
==== Docuseries ====
Title	Subject	Premiere	Seasons	Length	Language(s)	Status
Cricket Fever: Mumbai Indians	Sports	1 March 2019	1 season, 8 episodes	33–44 min	English	Ended
Bad Boy Billionaires: India	True crime/Business	5 October 2020	1 season, 3 episodes	52–64 min	English	Ended
Alma Matters: Inside the IIT Dream	Education	14 May 2021	1 season, 3 episodes	44–54 min	Hindi	Ended
Crime Stories: India Detectives	True crime	13 September 2021	1 season, 4 episodes	37–53 min	Kannada	Pending
House of Secrets: The Burari Deaths	True crime	8 October 2021	3 episodes	43–48 min	Hindi	Miniseries
Indian Predator: The Butcher of Delhi	True crime	20 July 2022	3 episodes	44–55 min	Hindi	Miniseries
Indian Predator: The Diary of a Serial Killer	True crime	7 September 2022	3 episodes	44–55 min	Hindi	Miniseries
Indian Predator: Murder In A Courtroom	True crime	28 October 2022	3 episodes	44–55 min	Hindi	Miniseries
Indian Predator: Beast of Bangalore	True crime	16 December 2022	3 episodes	42–52 min	Kannada	Miniseries
Mumbai Mafia: Police vs Underworld	True crime	6 January 2023		87 minutes	Hindi	Miniseries
The Romantics	Hindi cinema	14 February 2023	4 episodes	48–63 min	Hindi/English	Miniseries
The Hunt for Veerappan	True crime	8 August 2023	4 episodes	33–44 min	Hindi/English	Ended
Caught Out: Crime. Corruption. Cricket	True crime	March 17, 2023		78 min	Hindi	ended
The Indrani Mukerjea Story: Buried Truth	True crime	23 February 2024	4 Episodes	44 min	Hindi	Ended
Yo Yo Honey Singh: Famous	Biography	20 December 2024		80 min	Hindi	Ended
The Roshans	Biography	17 January 2025	4 episodes	45 min	Hindi	Ended
The Greatest Rivalry: India vs Pakistan	Sports	7 February 2025	3 episodes	36–40 min	Hindi/English	Ended
Dining With The Kapoors	Hindi cinema	21 November 2025		61 min	Hindi/English	Ended
Baahubali: The Torchbearer	Documentary	26 June 2026	4 episodes	20–35 min	Telugu	Ended

==== Reality ====
Title	Genre	Premiere	Seasons	Length	Language(s)	Status
What the Love! with Karan Johar	Dating show	30 January 2020	1 season, 7 episodes	45–50 min	English	Ended
Indian Matchmaking	Dating show	16 July 2020	2 seasons, 16 episodes	26–42 min	English	Renewed
Fabulous Lives of Bollywood Wives	Docu-reality	27 November 2020	3 season, 24 episodes	32–44 min	English	Renewed
The Big Day	Reality	14 February 2021	2 collection, 6 episodes	37–45 min	English	Ended
Lava Ka Dhaava	Game show	5 May 2021	1 season, 10 episodes	24–37 min	Hindi	Pending
IRL: In Real Love	Dating show	6 April 2023	1 season, 10 episodes	36–52 min	Hindi	Pending
Social Currency	Reality show	22 June 2023	1 season, 8 episodes	42–55 min	Hindi	Pending
Desi Bling	Reality television	20 May 2026	1 season, 10 episodes	40–55 min	Hindi	Pending
Awaiting release

=== Talk Show ===
Title	Genre	Premiere	Seasons	Host	Length	Language	Status
The Great Indian Kapil Show	Comedy and talk show	30 March 2024	5 seasons, 53 Episodes	Kapil Sharma	39–70 min.	Hindi	Running
Chiranjeevi's Megaverse	Talk show			Chiranjeevi		Telugu	Upcoming

=== Kids and family ===
Title	Premiere	Seasons	Length	Status
Mighty Little Bheem	12 April 2019	3 seasons, 64 episodes	6–7 min.	Ended
Mighty Little Bheem: Diwali	17 October 2019	1 collection, 3 episodes	6–7 min.	Ended
Mighty Little Bheem: Festival of Colors	5 March 2020	1 collection, 3 episodes	6–7 min.	Ended
Mighty Little Bheem: Kite Festival	8 January 2021	1 collection, 3 episodes	6–7 min.	Ended

== Multi-platform original programming ==
Title	Genre	Premiere	Language	Runtime	Status	Distribution	Notes
India's Got Latent (season 2)	Comedy, Reality, Talent show, Variety show	20 June 2026	Hindi	43–67 minutes	Returning series	Netflix and YouTube	Premiered simultaneously on Netflix and YouTube, with new episodes released every two weeks.

=== Continuations ===
Title	Genre	Prev. network(s)	Premiere	Seasons	Runtime	Language	Status
Little Things (seasons 2–4)	Romantic comedy	YouTube	5 October 2018	4 seasons, 29 episodes	19–38 min.	English/Hindi	Ended
Kota Factory (season 2-3)	Comedy drama	TVF Play	24 September 2021	3 season, 15 episode	30–45 min.	Hindi	Ended
Dhindora (season 2)	Comedy drama	YouTube	20 November 2026	2 seasons, 16 episodes	30 min.	Hindi	Ended

== Stand-up comedy specials ==
=== Specials ===
Title	Premiere	Runtime	Language
Vir Das: Abroad Understanding	25 May 2017	1 hour, 5 min.	English
Aditi Mittal: Things They Wouldn't Let Me Say	18 July 2017	1 hour, 2 min.	English
Vir Das: Losing it	11 December 2018	1 hour, 7 min.	English
Vir Das: For India	26 January 2020	1 hour, 15 min.	English
Amit Tandon: Family Tandancies	28 February 2020	1 hour, 12 min.	Hindi
Yours Sincerely, Kanan Gill	24 April 2020	1 hour, 12 min.	English
Kenny Sebastian: The Most Interesting Person in the Room	29 May 2020	1 hour, 7 min.	English
Vir Das: Outside In – The Lockdown Special	16 December 2020	50 min.	English
Kapil Sharma: I'm Not Done Yet	28 January 2022	58 min.	Hindi
Vir Das: Landing	25 December 2022	1 hour, 6 minutes	English
Zakir Khan by Papa Yaar	18 September 2026	1 hour, 18 minutes	Hindi
Sumukhi Suresh by Hoemonal	14 October 2026	1 hour, 13 minutes	Hindi

=== Series/collections ===
Title	Premiere	Seasons	Runtime	Language	Status
Ladies Up	27 March 2020	1 season, 4 episodes	15–17 min.	English/Hindi	Ended
Comedy Premium League	20 August 2021	1 season, 6 episodes	41–58 min.	Hindi	Pending

=== Films ===
Title	First screening	Genre	Runtime	Netflix exclusive region	Language
Krishna and His Leela	25 June 2020	Romantic comedy	2 hours, 5 min.	Selected territories	Telugu
Uma Maheswara Ugra Roopasya	30 July 2020	Comedy drama	1 hour, 45 min.	Selected territories	Telugu
Maniyarayile Ashokan	31 August 2020	Comedy drama	1 hour, 50 min.	Selected territories	Malayalam
Miss India	3 November 2020	Romantic drama	2 hours, 16 min.	Selected territories	Telugu
Andhaghaaram	23 November 2020	Supernatural horror thriller	2 hours, 51 min.	Selected territories	Tamil
Torbaaz	11 December 2020	Action thriller	2 hours, 13 min.	Selected territories	Hindi
Aelay	5 March 2021	Comedy drama	2 hours, 31 min.	Selected territories	Tamil
Irul	1 April 2021	Mystery thriller	1 hour, 30 min.	Selected territories	Malayalam
Mandela	5 April 2021	Political satire	2 hours, 20 min.	Selected territories	Tamil
Mimi	26 July 2021	Comedy drama	2 hours, 13 min.	Selected territories	Hindi
Boomika	23 August 2021	Action thriller	2 hours, 2 min.	Selected territories	Tamil
Tughlaq Durbar	11 September 2021	Political drama	2 hours, 25 min.	Selected territories	Tamil
Dasvi	7 April 2022	Social comedy	2 hours, 5 min.	Selected territories	Hindi
Toolsidas Junior	23 May 2022	Sport drama	2 hours, 10 min.	Selected territories	Hindi

== See also ==
- List of Amazon India originals
- List of JioHotstar original programming
- List of SonyLIV original programming
- List of ZEE5 original programming
