= Indian Predator: Beast of Bangalore =

- Genre: True crime docuseries
- Created by: Ashwin Rai Shetty
- Directed by: Ashwin Rai Shetty
- Starring: Raj Kumar Singh
- Country of origin: India
- Original languages: Hindi; Kannada
- No. of episodes: 3

Production
- Producer: Vice Studios
- Running time: 2h 23m

Original release
- Network: Netflix
- Release: 16 December 2022

Indian Predator: Beast of Bangalore is an Indian Netflix true crime docuseries directed by Ashwin Rai Shetty and produced by Vice Studios. The show was premiered on 16 December 2022. It is the third installment of Indian Predator series.

== Premise ==
The third instalment of Indian Predator, titled Beast of Bangalore is a true crime series that revolves around the crimes committed by Umesh Reddy during the 1990s in Karnataka, India. Shockingly, Umesh was a former police officer. He admitted to the heinous acts of raping and murdering 18 women and was found guilty in nine of these cases.

In 2009, the Karnataka High Court handed down a death sentence to Umesh for his crimes, a decision that was upheld by the Supreme court in 2011. However, in 2022, his death sentence was changed to a 30-year prison term after a mercy petition was considered.

== Reception ==
Abhishek Srivastava of The Times of India wrote, Indian Predator: Beast of Bangalore' is a captivating show that focuses mainly on the cunning nature of the killer and the tactics employed by the police to catch him; if only the creators hadn't rushed the production of this documentary series, the result could have been more impressive.

Manik Sharma of Firstpost found the story better conveyed through fiction. In fiction, creative freedom can lead to more tightly woven narratives aimed at achieving more than just the basic essentials.

== See also ==
- Indian Predator: The Butcher of Delhi, July 2022 Netflix docudrama, part of the same television franchise
- Indian Predator: The Diary of a Serial Killer, September 2022 Netflix docudrama, part of the same television franchise
- Indian Predator: Murder in a Courtroom, October 2022 Netflix docudrama, part of the same television franchise
