= Crime Stories (disambiguation) =

Crime Stories are narratives that centre on criminal acts and especially on the investigation of a crime.

Crime Stories may also refer to:

- Crime Stories (British TV series), a 2012 British crime drama television series
- Crime Stories (American TV program), a 1998–2010 American documentary crime television program
- Crime Stories: Khoj Apradhi Ki, a 2021 Indian Hindi-language interactive crime thriller series
- Crime Stories: India Detectives, a 2021 Indian documentary series
- Crime Stories, American title of the video game Martin Mystère: Operation Dorian Gray

== See also ==
- Crime Story (disambiguation)
