= Big Day (disambiguation) =

Big Day is an American situation comedy that revolves around the preparation for a wedding.

(The) Big Day may also refer to:

== Film and television ==
- Jour de fête or The Big Day, a 1949 French film
- The Big Day (1959 film), a 1959 Australian television drama
- The Big Day (1960 film), a 1960 British drama film
- Bada Din (lit. 'Big Day'), a 1998 Indian Christmas film
- The Big Day (2018 film), a 2018 Singaporean film
- The Big Day (TV series), an Indian TV series
- "The Big Day" (Drop the Dead Donkey), a 1990 television episode
- "The Big Day" (Rocket Power), the 2004 series finale
- "The Big Day" (Shameless), a 2005 television episode

== Music ==
- The Big Day (album), a 2019 album by Chance the Rapper
- The Big Day, an album by Kelly Chen
- "Big Day", a 1986 song by XTC from Skylarking
- "Big Day", a song from the 2022 British television series Don't Hug Me I'm Scared

== Other uses ==
- The Big Day, a novel by Barry Unsworth
- Bara Din (lit. 'Big Day'), Christmas in India

== See also ==
- "Big Days", an episode of How I Met Your Mother
- Lieldienas or Big Days, a celebration on March 23 in ancient Latvia
- Big Day Out (disambiguation)
