= Dil Bechara =

2020 Indian Hindi film by Mukesh Chhabra

- Official release poster
- Directed by: Mukesh Chhabra
- Written by: Shashank Khaitan; Suprotim Sengupta
- Story by: John Green
- Based on: The Fault in Our Stars by John Green
- Starring: Sushant Singh Rajput; Sanjana Sanghi
- Cinematography: Satyajit Pande
- Edited by: Aarif Sheikh
- Music by: A. R. Rahman
- Production company: Fox Star Studios
- Distributed by: Disney+ Hotstar
- Release date: 24 July 2020
- Running time: 101 minutes
- Country: India
- Language: Hindi
- Budget: est. ₹25–30 crore

Dil Bechara (transl. The helpless heart) is a 2020 Indian Hindi-language coming-of-age tragedy romance film directed by Mukesh Chhabra in his directorial debut, and produced by Fox Star Studios, with a script written by Shashank Khaitan and Suprotim Sengputa. Based on John Green's 2012 novel The Fault in Our Stars and its subsequent 2014 American film remake, the film stars Sushant Singh Rajput and Sanjana Sanghi as terminal cancer patients with an ensemble supporting cast, while Saif Ali Khan makes a cameo appearance. The film marks Rajput's unexpected posthumous appearance, following his death on 14 June 2020 (a month before the film's release).

Fox Star Studios acquired rights for an Indian adaptation in 2014, after which it underwent four years of casting and screenplay changes. Filming commenced under the title Kizie Aur Manny by late June 2018. The film was shot across Jamshedpur and Ranchi with sporadic schedules in Mumbai; apart from the last one in Paris, France. The score and soundtrack were composed by A. R. Rahman, with lyrics by Amitabh Bhattacharya. The cinematography and editing were performed by Setu and Aarif Sheikh, respectively.

The theatrical release suffered due to post-production delays, as well as the COVID-19 pandemic. Adding to this was Rajput's death on 14 June 2020, which resulted in a digital release on the Disney+ Hotstar streaming service on 24 July. In honour of Rajput, it was made accessible without subscription in India and select countries on the platform. The film received positive reviews, with praise for the running time, the performances of Rajput and Sanghi, direction, story, characterisation, soundtrack, cohesion and screenplay.

== Plot ==
Twenty-one-year-old Kizie Basu is fighting thyroid cancer when she meets 23-year-old Immanuel "Manny" Rajkumar Jr., who has previously suffered from osteosarcoma and is in remission. Manny and his friend Jagdish "JP" Pandey, who is suffering from glaucoma and is partially blind, are making a film together in which Manny plays the male lead, inspired by well-known actor Rajinikanth. Manny invites Kizie to be the female lead. The two bond over his love for Rajnikanth's films and her love for Hindi music, specifically an incomplete song by retired songwriter Abhimanyu Veer. Kizie and Manny gradually fall in love as they shoot scenes for Manny and JP's film. They decide to make 'Seri', the Tamil word for 'Okay', their secret word that will help them remember that everything will be okay in life and that it is important to stay positive. After an operation, JP loses sight in his second eye, making him go blind.

One day, Manny informs Kizie that he has managed to track down Abhimanyu and get in touch with him. Kizie e-mails Abhimanyu, who replies that he'll answer all her questions if she's able to visit him in Paris, where he lives. Kizie and Manny try to convince Kizie's parents to allow them to take the trip. They manage to convince them, on the condition that Kizie's mother joins them. As they are making arrangements for the trip, Kizie's cancer worsens, and she is suddenly hospitalised.

After her recovery, she is weakened and initially distances herself from Manny, but they eventually reconnect. They go to Paris to visit Abhimanyu, who turns out to have no conclusive answers and no reason for not finishing the song, disappointing Kizie. Soon after, Manny informs Kizie that his cancer has returned and that he is now terminal.

As Manny's health deteriorates, Kizie convinces him and JP to finish the film. Manny then invites JP and Kizie to his mock funeral, where they deliver eulogies that they have both prepared. Manny dies a couple of days later, leaving a letter for Kizie, explaining that he had finished Abhimanyu's song for her and had even convinced Abhimanyu to help him with the music despite considering him a terrible person.

JP's finished film premieres in an open-air theatre to a heartwarming response from the crowd, which consists of Kizie and Manny's friends and family. In the final scene of his film, Manny breaks the fourth wall and directly speaks to Kizie, telling her to live life to the fullest, to which she replies, "Seri".

The film ends with a tribute to the film's lead actor Sushant Singh Rajput.

== Cast ==
Primary cast in the order of appearance as per film credits.

- Sushant Singh Rajput as Immanuel "Manny" Rajkumar Jr.
- Sanjana Sanghi as Kizie Basu
- Saif Ali Khan as Abhimanyu "AV" Veer, a singer-songwriter who has disappeared into oblivion
- Sahil Vaid as Jagdish "JP" Pandey, Manny's friend
- Saswata Chatterjee as Abhiraj Basu, Kizie's father
- Swastika Mukherjee as Sunila Basu, Kizie's mother
- Sunit Tandon as Dr. Raj Kumar Jha, medical surgeon and palliative consultant
- Michael Muthu as Immanuel Rajkumar Senior, Manny's father
- Rajie Vijay Sarathy as Manny's mother
- Subbalakshmi as Manny's maternal grandmother

== Production ==
=== Pre-production ===
In August 2014, Fox Star Studios confirmed adapting The Fault in Our Stars for Bollywood. In an interview with Bollywood Hungama, Fox Star Studios CEO Vijay Singh stated "The Fault in Our Stars defines and resonates with the emotions of today's youth, across demographics". In September 2014, Varun Dhawan and Deepika Padukone were reported as the lead pair for planned remake. Producer-director duo Homi Adajania and Dinesh Vijan confirmed their association with the film. In an interview with aforementioned, the latter stated: "It's a story that I really feel needs to be told here. For me it's poignant at a time when we are consumed by technology and are manically running this make-believe race we think is "Life". Also, Karan Johar initially held the rights to remake the film. By October 2015, the duo backed out citing creative differences and Mohit Suri being brought on board as director. Dhawan could not be onboarded citing schedule conflicts. In an interview with Hindustan Times, Rajput denied being approached for the remake. He later confirmed through his Twitter handle about the film. In late 2016, the film was considered for debutante female lead for Sara Ali Khan, who backed out and her mother confirmed the project to be shelved. By December 2016, Alia Bhatt and Aditya Roy Kapur were considered for the project.

In June 2017, reports stated that Ishaan Khatter and Janhvi Kapoor both as debutantes were supposed to star in the remake. The project was then to be directed by Shashank Khaitan, who eventually wrote the dialogues for the film and went on to direct them instead in Johar's remake of Sairat, titled Dhadak. The screen test was completed by 25–26 June 2017. Also, the project was considered under Johar, reportedly, with Kapur being dropped off. However, the news media incorrectly cited the debutante pair as leads in the remake.

=== Development ===
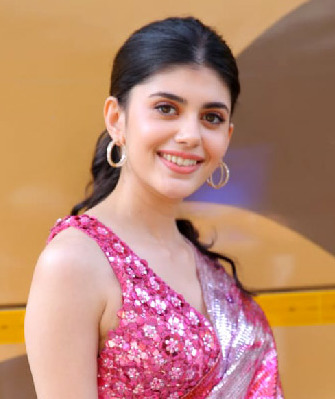
The film marked the debut of Sanjana Sanghi as a lead actress, after appearing in minor roles in Rockstar (2011), Hindi Medium and Fukrey Returns (2017). Her inclusion was confirmed, after she was personally associated with Mukesh Chhabra, who worked as the casting director in these films.

In October 2017, the project was confirmed to be starring Rajput as the male lead. Chhabra was selected to direct the film and was in stages of scripting with Khaitan and Suprotim Sengupta. Reports confirmed that Johar was not a part of the project. In March 2018, Chhabra confirmed Sanjana Sanghi as the female lead opposite Rajput. Whilst Chhabra served as casting director for 2011 film Rockstar, he recalled Sanghi's association with him. She was looking for a few ad jobs, was mature young lady by 2020. Since Rockstar, he wanted to make a film with her one-day, noting the film script as "ready to fit her in". That very month, A. R. Rahman was reported to compose the film's background score and soundtrack album. Mukherjee, who had previously worked with Rajput in Detective Byomkesh Bakshy!, confirmed her presence in the project by September 2018.

Screen tests were completed by end of June 2018. In an interview with IANS, Rajput stated: "I and Mukesh share a great bond. He gave me my first film and I promised him that I would definitely be in his. This was the first film I signed without reading the script, as I know Mukesh is a terrific director. And now that I have read the script, I am glad that I said yes." In an interview with Mid-Day, Chhabra stated he was able to visualise things as a whole with "Kizzie Aur Manny". He gave the film his own language without getting influenced by the casting, thereby a fresh touch to the love story. At the 2018 Jio MAMI Mumbai Festival, Former UTV studio head Rucha Pathak, Chief Creative Officer of Fox Star Studios, India stated that it took four years to write the script of "Kizie Aur Manny", as the "Word to Screen Market" is really bringing the world of cinema and literature together. She confirmed Sengupta for the film's screenplay and Khaitan for the dialogues.

The working title of the film Kizie Aur Manny was announced on 9 July 2018. However, on 8 February 2019, the film's title was changed officially to Dil Bechara. Pathak added that the change was to embody the theme emerging out of the title track composed by Rahman and lyricist Amitabh Bhattacharya.

In an interview with Gayle Sequeira at Film Companion, Sanghi summed up her character role "Kizie" in two phrases: "Emotionally demanding" and "oscillating between extremely happy to extremely romantic to extremely tragic". Kizie played the role of a Bengali girl where Chhabra wanted her to reach a state where she could converse in fluently in Bangla with Swastika Mukherjee (Kizie's mother) and Saswata Chatterjee (Kizie's father). For Sanghi, it took months of diction and cultural training, which she completed with the help of an NSD graduate. Sanghi also joined cancer support groups and spoke to many young survivors to understand the psychological and emotional impact that an illness can have on those who get diagnosed. In addition to Sanghi, Sahil Vaid in his role as "JP" also spent time with such patients. He called his character role both chirpy and cathartic. For the role of Kizie's mother, Mukherjee stated: "I think my natural maternal instincts kicked in for this... I didn't really need to work very hard." She found resemblance with her real life motherly behaviours into this role, extending the "dormant mother-in-waiting went into full-on active mode". In this interview with The Telegraph she went on to add that Kizie's father's role, played by Kahaani and Jagga Jasoos fame Saswata Chatterjee, was shorter than her role and people could connect with Dil Bechara on a personal level because it portrayed household scenes grounded with Indian cultures.

=== Filming ===
Principal photography commenced in Mumbai on 29 June 2018, where Rajput shared a promotional still titled "New Beginnings" from the sets on Twitter. Filming began in Jamshedpur on 9 July 2018. The film poster with its former title "Kizie Aur Manny" was released on the same day. Post his recce, Chhabra mentioned, "I needed a place with a small town vibe and had heard a lot about Jamshedpur. I knew instantly that this was where I wanted my love story to take root."

By August 2018, Farah Khan choreographed a dance number for Rajput (later deciphered as the title track "Dil Bechara"). The Jamshedpur and Ranchi schedule was wrapped up. The filming locations in Jamshedpur were Tata Steel, Hudco Park of Tata Motors, Tata Main Hospital, Tata Zoological Park, St. George's Church, St. Joseph Catholic Church, Sacred Heart Convent School, Kadma Marketing Complex, The Sonnet Hotel, Eco Park, Kaizer's Bungalow, Dindli Enclave and Payal Theatre. Filming locations of Ranchi were St. Albert's College, St. Xaviers College and St. Paul Cathedral Church. By September 2018, a 10-day schedule was completed in Mumbai, scenes filmed at Kohinoor Hospital in Kurla, Film City and Atharva College in Malad.

In mid-October 2018, Chhabra was suspended of services by Fox Star Studios, on account of allegations for sexual harassment amidst #MeToo movement in India. This resulted in filming stalled until late December 2018. A 9-day filming schedule planned, in Paris was deferred owing to the civil unrest across France and dates availed for filming scenes with Saif Ali Khan lapsed. Second schedule in Paris began on 9 January 2019, where a romantic song (titled "Khulke Jeene Ka") was filmed. The filming locations were Restaurant Louis Phillipe, Eiffel Tower, Hotel Normandi, Pont D'Arcole, Place Du Tertre Monmatre, Avenue Des Champs Elysees, Cimetiere Du Pere Lachaise Filming was completed by February 2019.

=== Post-production ===
Post-production began soon after February 2019. By October 2019, Sanghi began dubbing her portions. A. R. Rahman, tweeted an in-car video about checking the sound mix for the soundtrack album. Except for the climax sequence, Sushant Singh Rajput had completed dubbing for all of his portions in the film, before his death on 14 June 2020. The production team wanted someone who could dub his voice for the film, where they came in contact with RJ Aditya Chaudhary, who dubbed his voice for Sushant's character in the film's climax sequence.

== Soundtrack ==
The film score and soundtrack album are composed by A. R. Rahman with lyrics penned by Amitabh Bhattacharya. Rahman's association with the project was announced by March 2018 and Sony Music Entertainment acquired the record rights by July 2018. It was Rahman's title track which gave the film its new title "Dil Bechara" in February 2019. The music supervision for all the tracks were done by Hriday Gattani and Hiral Viradia. The tracks "Dil Bechara", "Main Tumhara" were the earliest to be recorded whereas the last one "Maskhari". As per Rahman, the whole album was curated to symbolise feelings of the heart and would be associated with memories of the late actor.

The title track served as the lead single followed by the soundtrack release by the record label Sony Music India on 10 July 2020. Upon release, the album received mixed reviews from music critics, who praised its orchestration, duet collaborations, and harmonies, but pointed out unusual lyrics and occasional musical overproduction. On 22 July 2020, a 13-minute tribute to the film's late lead actor in the form of a virtual concert on YouTube. The musical ensemble apart from the respective original track singers were A. R. Ameen and Raheema Rahman.

Upon the film's release, a fan spotted an unreleased hidden track in the original score. In his interaction on Twitter, Rahman agreed to complete the song. The song was released under the title "Never Say Goodbye" as a bonus single on 2 September 2020.

== Release ==
The film was announced for a release date on 29 November 2019, and the lead actress Sanjana Sanghi too confirmed this on 4 July 2019, she took her Instagram to share a post on completion of five years of the original counterpart film. However, by 15 November 2019, two weeks before the scheduled release date, it was announced that the theatrical release was pushed to 8 May 2020, due to post production delays. In the very month, Hindustan Times reported possibilities of Fox Star Studios releasing the film in May 2020 on a streaming platform, which the studio has refuted. The film's theatrical release got postponed again due to the COVID-19 pandemic.

Following Rajput's death, Fox Star Studios reinstated the decision to premiere the film posthumously over Disney+ Hotstar on 24 July 2020. In order to pay homage to the lead actor, the film was made accessible to all users sans platform subscriptions. The film's release was confirmed with a release poster on 25 June 2020, which featured Rajput and Sanghi in the ruins of a damaged bus. Apart from India, the film was made available for users in the US, UK and Canada. It also released on Disney+ Hotstar in Indonesia on 16 October with an Indonesian dub.

The film's official trailer was released on 6 July 2020, through the official YouTube channel of Fox Star Hindi, and garnered the title of "most-liked trailer", surpassing "likes" previously held by trailers of Avengers: Infinity War and Avengers: Endgame. The trailer raked in 5 million likes in less than 24 hours of release, thus becoming the most-liked Indian trailer, surpassing Vijay-starrer Bigil (2019), which garnered 2.1 million likes. As of 2024, the trailer holds 97 million views, with 10 million likes.

Apart from its release on streaming platform, the makers announced that it will have a television premiere on 9 August 2020 through Star Plus, and also on 23 August 2020 through Star Gold. The film had its theatrical release in New Zealand on 7 August 2020, in Fiji on 5 September 2020, and in Australia on 16 October 2020. It was initially slated to release in theatres across India, following their reopening for the first time after pandemic. However, the exhibitors refused to screen the film in theatres, stating that they would not violate the guidelines of cinemas by releasing a film in theatres after its digital launch.

On 1 September 2021, the film was made available to stream exclusively on Disney's corporate sibling Hulu, for subscribers across United States, as Hotstar ceased its operations in that country. As a result, Dil Bechara became one of the first Indian and non-English contents to be distributed exclusively on that site.

== Reception ==
=== Critical response ===
On the review aggregator website Rotten Tomatoes, 88% of 16 critics' reviews are positive, with an average rating of 6.2/10.

==== India ====
Devesh Sharma of Filmfare mentioned, "Perhaps this film, with its message of positivity, of hope, of love, is the perfect swan-song from Sushant for his legion of fans..." Assigning 3.5 stars (out of 5), he noted the film direction to pick shades of Rajesh Khanna's 1971 film Anand. Saibal Chatterjee for NDTV wrote, "The film will obviously always belong to Sushant Singh Rajput – on the money all the way, his performance demonstrates exactly why the chops he possessed weren't ordinary." He scored the film 3 out of 5. Taran Adarsh gave it four stars out of five. He described the film as a "beautiful love story. Sushant Singh Rajput is top notch, charismatic in light moments, makes you moist-eyed in emotional parts. Sanjana Sanghi is wonderful." Komal Nahta of Film Information called "It dull and depressing." Sreeparna Sengupta of The Times of India gave the film 3.5 stars (out of 5). She praised: "Given its poignant premise, Dil Bechara makes for a very emotional watch. Even as the story's underlying message, of celebrating life despite knowing the inevitable, injects it with an infectious energy." At Scroll Magazine, Udita Jhunjhunwala reviewed in positive: "Sushant Singh Rajput's final film is a moving experience." In his review for The Hindu, Kennith Rozario said the film was a surreal experience that bridges reality and fiction although quite shallow in its storytelling.

Also, Stutee Ghosh of The Quint pointed "This one is 1 hour and 40 minutes and the rush to get to the denouement robs the film of its magic making it an average affair which is a pity." She gave the film 2.5 stars (out of 5). Critic Baradwaj Rangan, whose review was published in Film Companion, titled: "A Watchable-Enough Romance That Offers A Small Sense Of Closure To A Big Tragedy". He stated: "The weakest parts are the film's stabs at comedy and its attachment to that musician who's become a JD Salinger-esque enigma." Reviewing at the OTT platform Arre, Poulumi Das stated: "Dil Bechara is not the most complicated or ambitious film but it does meet its own expectations. It is by no means a perfect film but it is not one without feeling" Critic and author Anna M. M. Vetticad stated: "Dil Bechara subtracts from the positives of the original with its slipshod rewriting, sloppy editing, and ordinary production quality." Continuing the critical review, intended a pun, "The fault, dear Brutus, is not in our stars but in the casual writing and direction." Critic Shubhra Gupta for The Indian Express acknowledged the film as "equal parts dirge and catharsis", assigning it 2.5 starts (out of 5). She noted: "It is the occasional sweetness that Sushant Singh Rajput and Sanjana Sanghi manage to rustle up that carries the film." Critic Komal Nahta stated "Dil Bechara is a dull fare. In normal circumstances, the film would have not been able to do well in the cinemas".

==== Overseas ====
Film critics Rebecca Breitfeller and Tyler Bey from Hollywood Insider praised the film noting that "both characters navigate the youthful beauties of life, all while dealing with the tragedies looming over every scene. They share stories of how cancer has affected their lives, and soon blossoms a beautiful friendship." Critic based at Inquiry, Musanna Ahmed called it a "pretty nice story", adding on: "...much of your enjoyment will depend on if you cared for John Green's story the first time [...] It is for those who haven't read the book or seen the original film because this takes plays almost beat-for-beat the same." In her review for The National, Aarti Jhurani praised the film length, calling it a sweet story is worth a watch for the myriad characters" She awarded a 4.5 score on a scale of 5, noting Sanghi's effortless portrayal of Kizie and Sushant Singh Rajput's bowing out with a bang. Tanul Thakur of The Wire remarked "Dil Bechara's initial segment shows that it's a smart, sharp movie. It ribs Bollywood's conception of 'happily-ever-after'". Karthik Ravindranath in his review for The Week noted: "Despite minor faults, this girl-meets-boy tale is worth your time." Dyuti Gupta of SheThePeople.TV wrote: "Sushant's final film Is a poignant tribute to his life and talent".

On the contrary, Rachit Raj of Medium presented a mixed view: "A decent love-story that tries too much to reinvent itself." Hannah Abraham of Cultured Vultures summarised: "While transposing the idea for Indian audiences, much of the subtlety, nuance and emotional depth of the original film seems to have seeped through the cracks." She assigned the film a score of 6.5 on 10, calling it an average watch and certainly not comparable to the original. Gautaman Bhaskaran for Arab News wrote: "Dil Bechara is not a great work. It is casually written and poorly directed."

=== Streaming viewership ===
Upon its premiere through OTT platform Disney+ Hotstar on 24 July, the film registered 95 million views within 24 hours of its release. Media houses estimated that the opening in terms of revenue would be ₹2000 crore by multiplying the viewership with an average ticket price of ₹200. As per a report "Crisis Consumption on TV and Smartphones" published by BARC and Nielsen Media in September 2020, the film was noted as "most-viewed film on a smartphone" in India. A survey report from LetsOTT, claimed that the film became the most watched direct OTT release in India. In December 2020, Twitter India released a survey report stating that the film topped the list in most tweeted Indian film of 2020. It was also Google's top searched film of 2020 in India.

== Accolades ==
Award (Note: Awards, festivals and organizations are in alphabetical order.)	Date of ceremony (Note: Date is linked to the article about the awards held that year, wherever possible.)	Category	Recipient(s)	Result	Ref.
Filmfare Awards	27 March 2021	Best Actor	Sushant Singh Rajput	Nominated	
Filmfare Awards	27 March 2021	Best Music Director	A. R. Rahman	Nominated	
Filmfare Awards	27 March 2021	Best Background Score	A. R. Rahman	Nominated	
Filmfare Awards	27 March 2021	Best Choreography	Farah Khan – (for song "Dil Bechara")	Won	
Mirchi Music Awards	19 March 2022	Album of The Year	Dil Bechara	Nominated	
Mirchi Music Awards	19 March 2022	Listeners' Choice Album of The Year	Dil Bechara	Nominated	
