= Rashtra Kavach Om =

2022 Indian film by Kapil Verma

- Theatrical release poster
- Directed by: Kapil Verma
- Written by: Raj Saluja; Niket Pandey
- Produced by: Zee Studios; Ahmed Khan; Shaira Khan
- Starring: Aditya Roy Kapur; Sanjana Sanghi; Jackie Shroff; Ashutosh Rana; Prakash Raj; Prachee Shah Paandya
- Cinematography: Vineet Malhotra
- Edited by: Kamlesh Parui
- Music by: Amandeep Singh Jolly
- Production companies: Zee Studios; A Paper Doll Entertainment Production
- Distributed by: Zee Studios
- Release date: 1 July 2022
- Running time: 135 minutes
- Country: India
- Language: Hindi
- Box office: est. ₹9.01 crore

Rashtra Kavach Om (trans National Shield Om) is a 2022 Indian action film directed by Kapil Verma and produced by Zee Studios and Ahmed Khan. It stars Aditya Roy Kapur, Sanjana Sanghi, Jackie Shroff, Ashutosh Rana, Prakash Raj and Prachee Shah Paandya. The film was released in theatre on 1 July 2022 and on ZEE5 on 11 August 2022.

== Plot ==
A classified RAW safehouse is breached during a covert intelligence drop in Srinagar, coordinated by Colonel Arvind Chauhan (RAW tactical chief) and Imran Qureshi (field operative), with Defense Minister K.M. Menon's authorization. The mission: recover fragments of Rakhtpat, an aborted mind-control program developed for strategic warfare. Lead agent Rishi Singh Rathore is ambushed during extraction. The data is compromised, and Rishi disappears after detonating an EMP device. He is presumed dead.

3 months later, Rishi is revealed to be alive, living off-grid in Himachal under a new identity. He is found by Meera Sharma, a cybersecurity analyst assigned to monitor digital anomalies tied to Rakhtpat. Meera informs RAW via her colleague Micky Rawat (tech expert) and Rajan Dev (internal security head), triggering an attempt on Rishi's life. He narrowly escapes with Meera's help. Driven by flashes of repressed trauma, Rishi insists on returning to an abandoned military outpost near the Indo-China border, where his memory begins to unravel.

In a flashback, Rishi's sister Dr. Reena Rathore, a neuroscientist, worked alongside their father Colonel Surya Rathore on Project Rakhtpat. The program, approved by Chauhan and Menon, aimed to enhance cognitive warfare. But Surya discovered Rakhtpat's misuse—targeted neurological manipulation. He attempted to expose the truth but was assassinated. The cover story painted him a traitor. A young Rishi witnessed the murder and was rescued by Chauhan, who raised him as a RAW cadet, burying the truth.

Present-day: Rishi learns that Ravindra "Ravan" Kaul, a legendary ex-agent and one-time protégé of Chauhan, has resurfaced, now auctioning Rakhtpat's control algorithms to hostile regimes. Ravan faked his death and framed Surya years ago to seize control of the technology, with backing from a covert faction led by Menon. When Chauhan tries to warn Rishi, he is executed by Ravan's men.

Rishi, with help from Meera, Imran, and Major Thapa (a loyal commando), deciphers a hidden message left by Chauhan in a decrypted ops log. It leads them to Yerevan, Armenia, where Ravan is set to demo Rakhtpat's capabilities to international bidders. Rishi infiltrates the summit and confronts both Ravan and Menon, discovering Menon was the mastermind behind Surya's framing and Chauhan's execution.

In a brutal showdown, Rishi kills Ravan, exposes Menon to the global intelligence community, and secures Rakhtpat's neural core. He uploads it to the Indian defense cloud, rendering it inaccessible to rogue nations.

In the aftermath, Rishi, Meera, and Reena pay tribute to Chauhan and Surya. Rishi declines a RAW promotion, choosing instead to train recruits at a covert academy. As he walks away, a new encrypted phone lights up: “Next Mission Incoming...”

== Cast ==
- Aditya Roy Kapur as Om Rathore
- Sanjana Sanghi as Kavya Sharma
- Ashutosh Rana as Jai Rathore
- Jackie Shroff as Dev Rathore
- Prakash Raj as Darshan Murthy
- Prachee Shah Paandya as Dr. Reena Rathore
- Vicky Arora as Imran Qureshi
- Rohit Choudhary as Rajan Dev
- Vikram Kochhar as Micky Rawat
- Shubhangi Latkar as Vandana
- Bijou Thaangjam as Major Thapa

== Production ==
The principal photography commenced on 3 December 2020 and wrapped up on 17 February 2021. Parts of the film were shot in Armenia. as produced by Zee Studios in association of A Paper Doll Entertainment Production.

== Music ==
Rashtra Kavach Om

Soundtrack album by Arko Pravo Mukherjee, Chirantan Bhatt, Amjad Naadem Aamir and Enbee
- Released: 27 June 2022
- Recorded: 2021–2022
- Genre: Feature film soundtrack
- Length: 33:30
- Language: Hindi
- Label: Zee Music Company

Official audio
- Rashtra Kavach Om - Full Album on YouTube

The music of the film is composed by Arko Pravo Mukherjee, Amjad Nadeem Aamir, Chirantan Bhatt and Embee. Lyrics are written by Kumaar, Manoj Yadav and A. M. Turaz. The background score is composed by Amandeep Singh Jolly.

Tracklist
| No. | Title | Lyrics | Music | Singer(s) | Length |
|---|---|---|---|---|---|
| 1. | "Kala Sha Kala" (Duet Version) | Kumaar | Amjad Nadeem Aamir, Enbee | Raahi, Dev Negi | 3:16 |
| 2. | "Saansein Dene Aana" | Manoj Yadav | Chirantan Bhatt | Raj Barman, Palak Muchhal | 4:03 |
| 3. | "Seher" (Male version) | A. M. Turaz | Arko | Arijit Singh, Abrar ul Haq | 5:05 |
| 4. | "Saansein Bhari Hai" (Female Version) | Manoj Yadav | Chirantan Bhatt | Juhi Nair | 3:44 |
| 5. | "Saansein Bhari Hai" (Male Version) | Manoj Yadav | Chirantan Bhatt | Raj Barman | 4:02 |
| 6. | "Saansein Dene Aana (Male Version)" | Manoj Yadav | Chirantan Bhatt | Raj Barman | 4:03 |
| 7. | "Seher" (Female version) | A. M. Turaz | Arko | Aditi Singh Sharma | 5:11 |
| 8. | "Saansein Dene Aana" (Female Version) | Manoj Yadav | Chirantan Bhatt | Palak Mucchal | 4:06 |
| Total length: | | | | | 33:30 |

== Release ==
=== Theatrical ===
The film was theatrically released worldwide on 1 July 2022.

=== Home media ===
The digital distribution rights were acquired by ZEE5. The film premiered on ZEE5 from 11 August 2022.

== Controversy ==
In June 2022, the film title was changed from Om: The Battle Within to Rashtra Kavach Om due to makers facing trouble with regards to the title rights.

== Reception ==
Rashtra Kavach Om received negative reviews from critics with criticism directed towards its direction, action sequences, writing and performances. On the review aggregator website Rotten Tomatoes, 0% of 9 critics' reviews are positive, with an average rating of 3.2/10.

Ronak Kotecha of The Times of India rated the film 2.5 out of 5 stars and wrote, "Rashtra Kavach Om is just as unreal and outlandish as its name, if not more. But if you're a diehard Aditya Roy Kapur fan then maybe this mission isn't all that doomed for you." Nairita Mukherjee of India Today rated the film 2 out of 5 stars and wrote, "Aditya Roy Kapur's glistening biceps, though impressive, may not be strong enough to hold the weight of this strictly average actioner." Dishya Sharma of News 18 rated the film 2 out of 5 stars and wrote, "Aditya Roy Kapur turns into an action hero but fails to pack the punch." Sanjana Jadhav of Pinkvilla rated the film 1.5 out of 5 stars and wrote, "Rashtra Kavach OM is a messy and unsatisfying two-hour action film that has too many WTF moments to keep up with." Shubhra Gupta of The Indian Express rated the film 1.5 out of 5 stars and wrote, "Aditya Roy Kapur-Sanjana Sanghi starrer is yet another addition to films Bollywood has adopted as a safe bet these days, with a hero who has patriotism oozing out of his pores." A critic from Bollywood Hungama rated the film 1.5 stars out of five and said that Rashtra Kavach Om is a poor show and will have a very tough time at the box office. Nandini Ramnath of Scroll.in rated the film 1 out of 5 stars and wrote, "Kapur's Om is most alive when he's yelling the battle cry "Jai Bhavani!" with the fervour of a Shiv Sainik." Saibal Chatterjee of NDTV rated the film 1 out of 5 stars and wrote, "Since there is no defence system that can reverse the ill effects of bad writing, Rashtra Kavach Om is never in with a chance of putting two sensible ideas together."
