= Chandrakant Jha =

Indian serial killer

- Born: 1967 (age 58–59); Ghosai, Madhepura, Bihar, India
- Other name: The Butcher of Delhi
- Known for: Murder and track dismemberment of former associates
- Status: Incarcerated
- Conviction: Murder (3 counts)
- Penalty: 2 death sentences; commuted to life imprisonment

Details
- Victims: Pandit, aka Mangal (1998); Shekhar (2003); Umesh (2003); Guddu (2005); Anil Mandal (2006); Upender (2007); Dilip (2007)
- Country: India
- State: Delhi
- Target: Young male migrants
- Date apprehended: 1998, 2003, May 2007
- Imprisoned at: Tihar Jail

Chandrakant Jha (born 1967) is an Indian serial killer who befriended, then killed and dismembered 8 victims in West Delhi between 1998 and 2007. His first killing took place in 1998 for which he was arrested and held in jail until 2002, when he was released due to lack of evidence. Following his release, he embarked upon a spate of killings. First Shekar and Umesh in 2003, then Guddu in 2005, then Amit in 2006 and finally Upender and Dalip in 2007. He would befriend migrant labourers from Bihar and Uttar Pradesh and help them get small jobs. Later, petty disputes over things like theft, lying or being non-vegetarian would lead him to murder them by strangulation. Chandrakant took pleasure in taunting the police by leaving dismembered body parts around the city and outside the Tihar Jail with notes, daring the police to catch him.

He was found guilty on three counts of murder and received two death sentences and life imprisonment until death in February 2013. His death sentences were commuted to life imprisonment without remission in January 2016. In January 2022, his request for parole was denied.

Chandrakant worked as a hawker in Delhi's weekly bazaars. He married twice, abandoning his first wife within a year. He has five daughters with his second wife. He mostly lived away from his family.

In August 2023, The High Court granted a 90-day parole to him. Jha had sought parole, saying he has to finalise a "suitable groom" for his eldest daughter.

== In popular culture ==
On 20 July 2022, Netflix released a documentary series called Indian Predator: The Butcher of Delhi, a series on Chandrakant Jha's life and his killings.
