= Crime Story (disambiguation) =

Crime fiction stories are narratives that centre on criminal acts and especially on the investigation of a crime.

Crime Story may also refer to:

- Crime Story (1993 film), a 1993 film starring Jackie Chan
- Crime Story (2021 film), a 2021 film starring Richard Dreyfuss
- Crime Story (American TV series), a 1986–1988 American television series starring Dennis Farina that aired on NBC
- Crime Story (British TV series), a 1992–1995 British television series that was broadcast on ITV
- Crime Story (magazine), a monthly publication that brings out stories by Indra Soundar Rajan and other writers
- Crime Story (novel), a 1994 novel by New Zealand author Maurice Gee
- A song by rapper DMX from his 1998 debut album It's Dark and Hell is Hot.

== See also ==
- Crime Stories (disambiguation)
