= Akku Yadav =

Indian criminal (1971–2004)

- Born: Bharat Kalicharan Yadav; 1971; Nagpur, Maharashtra, India
- Died: 13 August 2004 (aged 32); Nagpur District Court, Vidarbha, Maharashtra, India
- Cause of death: Homicide by lynching (primarily stabbing)

Details
- Victims: 3+ murder victims, over 40 rape victims
- Span of crimes: 1991 – 7 August 2004
- Country: India
- State: Maharashtra
- Date apprehended: 7 August 2004

Bharat Kalicharan Yadav (1971 – 13 August 2004), also known as Akku Yadav, was an Indian gangster, burglar, kidnapper, serial rapist, murderer, and extortionist. Akku grew up in the Kasturba Nagar slum, which is located in the Indian central city of Nagpur, Maharashtra. He lived and did business in the slum which housed a number of criminals and two rival gangs.

Akku's earliest known crime was a gang rape in 1991. Akku and his gang committed crimes consisting of rape, murder, home invasion, and extortion in Kasturba Nagar for 13 years, until his death. Akku tried to create a small business empire; he extorted money, harming and threatening those who resisted him. During his life as a criminal, Akku murdered at least three individuals. He tortured and kidnapped people, invaded homes, and raped over 40 women and girls. He bribed police, giving them money and buying them drinks to convince them to let him continue committing crimes. As a result, the police not only refused to stop Akku for many years, but supported him. Akku and his associates gang-raped women and girls as young as age 10 as a "warning" to those who resisted him.

After a woman named Usha Narayane resisted Akku and his gang, a mob burned down Akku's house. Akku went to the police seeking protection, and was arrested for his safety. During his bail hearing, on 13 August 2004, he was lynched in the courtroom by several hundred women who stabbed and stoned him. He had chili powder thrown in his face, and his penis was hacked off. The women all claimed responsibility for the murder, and although some were arrested, they were eventually acquitted. Although hundreds of women were involved in the lynching, the State CID had a different version of the events. Senior police sources said the lynching was carried out by four men and that the women who had claimed responsibility were protecting them. None of the women agreed with the police version. Police said that both men and women were present when the lynch mob appeared. On the day of the lynching, BBC News initially reported that about 14 women and several children forced their way into the courtroom and stabbed Akku to death. A film based on the incident, 200: Halla Ho, was released on 20 August 2021 digitally on ZEE5. A limited web series called Indian Predator: Murder in a Courtroom was released on Netflix depicting the story and interviews of the victims.

== Biography ==
=== Early life ===
Akku Yadav grew up in Kasturba Nagar, a slum of Nagpur, Maharashtra. He had two younger brothers—Santosh and Yuvraj. According to author Mitzi Szereto, Akku's father, a milkman, had formed a criminal gang consisting of his sons, their cousins and family friends. Since childhood, along with several relatives and other neighbourhood boys, Akku extorted local vendors and shopkeepers for money or their products under threat of violence. In his teenage years, Akku was noted as a voyeur who spied on female residents defecating in the bushes.

In her book Killing Justice: Vigilantism in Nagpur, author Swati Mehta wrote: "by all accounts, a child of the neighbourhood, Akku had graduated from milkman's son to local menace".

=== Crimes ===
Akku's first confirmed rape occurred in 1991, when Akku and his gang kidnapped a woman who passed by their hideout inside an abandoned building. After the rape, the woman reported the assault to Jaripatka police station, where she was initially ignored by the officers, who were receiving bribes from Akku from his extortion operation. Ultimately, a complaint was filed and Akku was arrested, but the case was never taken to court. Following his release by posting bail, Akku broke into the woman's home and beat her and her husband. The instance remained the only time where a rape led to a criminal complaint against Akku.

In their book Half the Sky: Turning Oppression into Opportunity for Women Worldwide, authors Nicholas D. Kristof and Sheryl WuDunn wrote: "Akku Yadav was, in a sense, the other 'success' of Kasturba Nagar. He was a deplorable man who had turned an apprenticeship as a small-time thug into a role as a mobster and king of the slum." Akku ruled a gang of criminals who controlled the Kasturba Nagar slum. They robbed, tortured, and killed people with Impunity. Akku committed crimes for several years as he created a small business empire. He and his gang members often harassed and intimidated people to extort money. Extortion was his main source of income, and he would hurt people if they did not give him money or if they angered him in any way. Akku characteristically threatened to rape anyone who resisted him. It is known that many of Akku's rape victims were Dalits, who face a disproportionate level of difficulty in receiving justice for cases of sexual assault.

Pratibha Urkude and her husband Dattu ran a small grocery shop and Akku harassed them for years. He would pick up goods from the shop and refuse to pay or would simply pay much less than was owed. Sometimes he would demand money and become violent if they were unable to pay. Akku often worried he was being plotted against. As a result, he did not permit men or women to gather and talk. He made sure young boys did not play together, and if they did, Akku would break up their games. Suspicious that people were asking questions about him, he would warn people against reporting his crimes to the police, threatening them if they did so. Killing left inconvenient corpses that required him to bribe the police to prevent them from stopping his crimes.

Rape, however, was very stigmatizing and, as a result, the victims could be relied on to remain silent. Akku raped people to silence them far more frequently than murdering them. The women who killed Akku claimed that he had been raping and abusing local women with Impunity for over a decade. They alleged that local police had refused to help his victims or pursue charges because Akku was bribing them. Yadav's crimes encompassed Rape, Murder, Robbery, Extortion, home invasion, Assault, and Criminal intimidation. Before his death, Akku had been arrested some 14 times. In late 1999, he was detained for a year under the Maharashtra preventive detention law—The Maharashtra Prevention of Dangerous Activities of Slumlords, Boot-leggers, Drug Offenders and Dangerous Persons Act 1981.

Akku allegedly raped so many people that according to residents of the Kasturba Nagar slum, a rape victim lives in every other house there. Akku allegedly raped over 40 women; his youngest victim being a 10-year-old girl. One person described Akku as "the Gabbar Singh of Kasturba Nagar" saying, "We stayed mostly indoors when Akku was around". Women have said Akku and his gang would invade homes any time of the day. He sometimes wanted a motorcycle or would grab a mobile phone or extort money. Akku and his gang members would beat up anyone who resisted them. He murdered a woman named Asha Bai, a daughter of Anjana Bai Borkar, in front of her 16-year-old granddaughter. Borkar was one of five women arrested for Akku's lynching. Speaking of Akku, the granddaughter said: "We were eating dinner when he came to the front door and pretended to be a friend of my brother. When my mother opened the door, he dragged her out and stabbed her. He then cut off her ears for her earrings and her fingers because he could not get her rings." Akku had reportedly murdered at least three people and dumped their bodies on local railroad tracks.

One woman described how she and her husband were attacked by Akku. He came to their house between 4:00 and 5:00 AM. Akku knocked aggressively on their door saying he was a police official, and asked them to open it. Once Akku entered, he stabbed the husband in the thigh with a knife, locked him in the bathroom and dragged the wife by her hair away to a place where he raped her. Akku allowed her to return after three or four hours. In January 2004, Akku was banned from entering Nagpur city. An elderly man named Harichand Khorse, who earned a small amount of money playing a musical instrument called a baja, was beaten violently by Akku because he was unable to pay 100 rupees. According to neighbors in Kasturba Nagar, Akku once raped a woman right after her wedding. He also stripped a man naked and burned him with a cigarette, then forced him to dance in front of his 16-year-old daughter. Akku took a woman named Asha Bhagat and tortured her in front of her daughter and several neighbours by cutting off her breasts. Akku then sliced Bhagat into pieces on the street, killing her. A man named Avinash Tiwari, one of the neighbours, was horrified by the murder and planned to report Akku to the police. As a result, Akku butchered him. Akku and his men gang-raped a woman named Kalma ten days after she gave birth. After what happened to her, Kalma committed suicide; she burned to death after dousing herself with kerosene and lighting it. Akku's gang pulled another woman from her house when she was seven months pregnant. They stripped her naked and raped her on the road in public view.

Akku ordered his men to drag girls as young as age 12 to a nearby derelict building to gang rape. Many of Akku's victims reported his crimes. Instead of arresting him, the police told him who had reported the crime; Akku would go after them. The police worked with Akku, protected him and supported him; he gave them bribes and drinks. When a 22-year-old woman reported being raped by Akku, the police accused her of having an affair with him and sent her away. Several women were turned away by police after being told: "You're a loose woman. That's why he raped you." One woman told the police she was gang-raped by Akku and his associates. The police responded by gang-raping the woman themselves. Twenty-five families moved out of Kasturba Nagar. People, however, removed their daughters from schools and kept them locked inside their homes where nobody could see them. Vegetable vendors avoided Kasturba Nagar, so housewives had to go to far-away markets to buy food. As long as Akku only targeted poor people, the police would not interfere.

He and his men attempted to extort Ratna Dungiri, damaged her furniture, and threatened to murder her family. Since Dungiri refused to file a police report, Usha Narayane filed one herself, but Akku surrounded Narayane's house with his men after the police informed him of the complaint. Akku threatened Narayane with a bottle of acid, while she called the police, who never arrived. After Akku and his men attempted to force open the door to Narayane's house, she opened a gas cylinder and threatened to blow up everyone present, after which Akku's gang left.

The neighbours heard about what Narayane had done and were now willing to go after him. Soon there were many angry victims on the streets, and they started to pick up sticks and stones. People threw stones at Akku's associates. His men saw the crowd's mood and fled. The victims marched through the slum and celebrated. On 6 August 2004, they went to Akku's house and burned it down. Akku now feared for his life and went to the police for protection; they arrested him for his own protection on 7 August 2004. Akku's mother vacated his house. On 7 August, Akku was due to appear at the city district court and 500 slum residents gathered. As Akku arrived, one of his men tried to pass him knives wrapped in a blanket; the police failed to notice this. After the women protested, the accomplice was arrested, and Akku was taken back into custody. He threatened to return and teach every woman in the slum a lesson. On 8 August 2004, a group attacked Akku while he was being taken before the court; he survived the attack only to be lynched five days later.

== Death ==
District Court Building in Nagpur, Maharashtra.

After the police arrested Akku for his own protection, a bail hearing was scheduled for him on 13 August 2004 in India's Nagpur District Court. Word spread through the adjoining neighborhood that he would be released. The police planned to keep him in custody until everyone had calmed down and then release him. The bail hearing was supposed to take place miles away in the centre of Nagpur.

Hundreds of women marched from the slums to the courthouse carrying vegetable knives and chili powder, walked into the courtroom and took seats near the front. Akku walked in and was confident and Unrepentant. At about 2:30 to 3:00 PM, when Akku appeared, he saw a woman he had raped. Akku mocked her, called her a prostitute and said he would rape her again. The police laughed. The woman started hitting him on the head with her footwear. She told Akku either she would kill him or he would have to kill her saying, "We can't both live on this Earth together. It's you or me."

Akku was then lynched by the mob of 200–400 women who showed up. He was stabbed at least 70 times, and chili powder and stones were thrown in his face. The chili powder was also thrown into the faces of police officers who guarded him. The police officers, overwhelmed and terrified, fled immediately. One of his alleged victims also hacked off his penis. The lynching occurred in Nagpur District Court No. 7 on the marble floor of the courtroom. As he was being lynched, Akku was horrified and shouted: "Forgive me! I won't do it again!". The women passed their knives around and kept stabbing him; each woman agreed to stab Akku at least once. His blood was on the floors and walls of the courtroom. Akku died 15 minutes later; he was 32 years old. The mob continued attacking his corpse post-mortem.

The women claimed the murder was unplanned. One woman said: "We didn't have any formal meetings, but it spread by word of mouth that we had to take united action." The State CID of Maharashtra Police had a different version of the lynching. According to senior police sources, the lynching was done by four men with sharp weapons, and the women of Kasturba Nagar claimed responsibility for the lynching to protect those men. None of the women agreed with the police version, and police said both men and women were there when the lynch mob appeared. BBC News reported on the lynching on the day it occurred saying: "Initial reports said about 14 women and several children forced their way into the courtroom" and stabbed Akku Yadav to death.

=== Aftermath ===
The women returned to Kasturba Nagar to tell their husbands and fathers they had killed Akku. Slum dwellers celebrated, and families put on music and danced in the streets. They bought food and handed out fruit to their friends. Five women were arrested immediately but released following demonstrations in the city. Every woman living in the locality claimed responsibility for the lynching. Usha Narayane was arrested and charged with murder, as were other women. On August 17, a crowd of 400 women and more than 100 men and children gathered at the courthouse to support the women. The crowd said they would not move until the women were granted bail. In 2012, Narayane was acquitted. Twenty-one others, including six women, were also arrested; in 2014 it was reported that all had been released due to lack of evidence.

A judge noted a lack of reliable witnesses to the lynching, including unreliable police statements, and cited Akku's autopsy report, which showed alcohol in his system, as proof that he was receiving Preferential treatment from police. Retired high court judge Bhau Vahane publicly defended the women who lynched Akku Yadav, saying: "In the circumstances they underwent, they were left with no alternative but to finish Akku. The women repeatedly pleaded with the police for their security, but the police failed to protect them." He also said: "If they took law into their hands, it was because the law and law-enforcing agencies had not given them succour." ACP Dalbir Bharati said: "There are 200 women who say we did it. The investigating officer found no weapon or blood marks on the five women who were arrested, we found no evidence against these women." Shortly after Akku's death, Outlook, an Indian magazine, reported that local police spoke indirectly about gang-war rivalries between Akku's group and a smaller one that allegedly supported the women. According to Outlook, a nephew of Akku swore revenge for his lynching.

On the night of 4 December 2013, a nephew of Akku Yadav named Mukri Chhotelal Yadav was stabbed to death at age 30 by two teenagers aged 15 and 17. Mukri allegedly made sexual advances on one of the teenagers' grandmothers and had once threatened her with a knife. The grandmother, who was in her 50s, was harassed and menaced by Mukri. The grandmother told the teens about this and the teens warned Mukri, but he continued to victimize the grandmother. Mukri, like Akku, also had a history of crime.

=== In fiction and media ===
In 2011, a documentary about Akku called Candles in the Wind was released. In 2015, a movie inspired by Akku called Keechaka was released. It was controversial and women protested against the movie because of the graphic violence against women depicted in it. The movie's director, N.V.B. Chaudhary, defended the film, saying it supports women. 200 Halla Ho, a crime thriller film released in 2021 featuring actor Amol Palekar, was based on Akku Yadav.

== Bibliography ==
- Kristof, Nicholas; WuDunn, Sheryl (2009). Half the Sky: Turning Oppression into Opportunity for Women Worldwide (PDF). Alfred A. Knopf. ISBN 9780307267146.
- Stackhouse, Max L.; Pachuau, Lalsangkima (2007). News of Boundless Riches: Interrogating, Comparing, and Reconstructing Mission in a Global Era. ISPCK. ISBN 9788184580143.
- Mehta, Swati (2005). Killing Justice: Vigilantism in Nagpur (PDF). Human Rights Initiative. ISBN 81-88205-13-3.

== See also ==
- List of serial killers by country
- 200 Halla Ho
