= Mukesh Chhabra =

Indian casting director

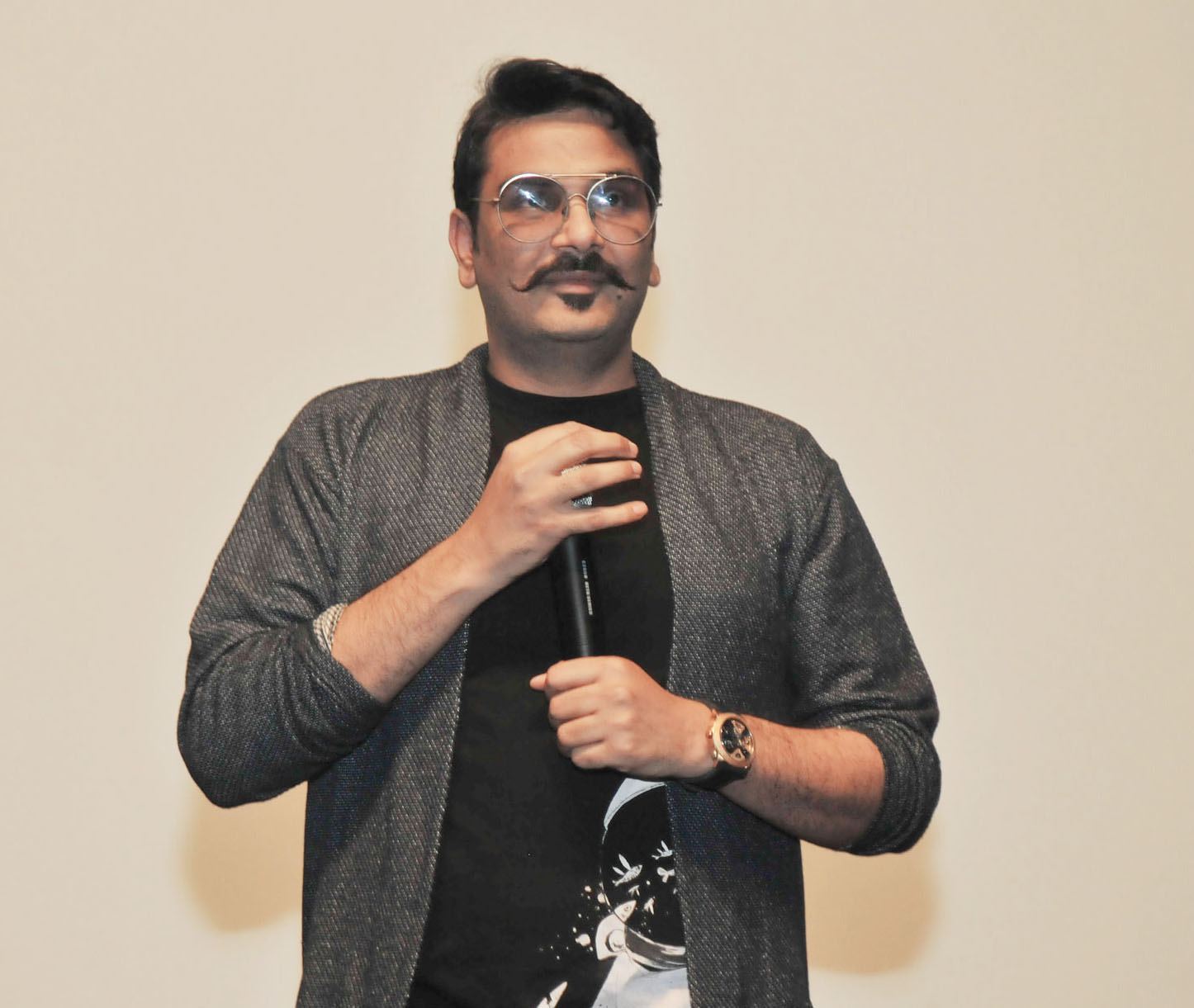
- Chhabra in 2017
- Born: 27 May 1984 (age 42); Delhi, India
- Education: National School of Drama
- Occupations: Casting director; Filmmaker; Actor
- Years active: 2006–present
- Known for: Dil Bechara (2020); Jawan (2023); Bajrangi Bhaijaan (2015); Bombay Velvet (2015); Rockstar (2011)

Mukesh Chhabra (born 27 May 1984) is an Indian casting director, filmmaker and actor. Some of his notable works include Bajrangi Bhaijan (2015), Bombay Velvet (2015), Dangal (2016), Dil Bechara (2020), Scam 1992 (2020), Laal Singh Chaddha (2022), Commando (2023), Jawan (2023), Dunki (2023), Chamak (2023), Kafas (2023), Dhurandhar (2025) and Dhurandhar: The Revenge (2026).

== Early life and education ==
He was born in a Punjabi family in Delhi in 1984. He studied acting at the Shri Ram Centre for Performing Arts. He completed a six-year acting and teaching stint with the ‘Theatre in Education’ Company (TIE) affiliated with the National School of Drama in New Delhi.

== Career ==
He started his career as an assistant casting director in 2006 with Rang De Basanti. In 2012, he played a cameo in Anurag Kashyap's Gangs of Wasseypur – Part 2, which also featured Nawazuddin Siddiqui and Manoj Bajpayee. In 2015, he was the casting director for Kabir Khan's Bajrangi Bhaijan, starring Salman Khan and Kareena Kapoor Khan. In the same year, he did the casting for Bombay Velvet, featuring Ranbir Kapoor, Anushka Sharma and Karan Johar. In 2016, he did the casting for Nitesh Tiwari's Dangal, starring Aamir Khan, who also produced the film.

Mukesh made his directorial debut with Dil Bechara in 2020, featuring Sushant Singh Rajput and Sanjana Sanghi. In 2020, he was the casting director for Scam 1992, directed by Hansal Mehta. In 2022, he did the casting for Advait Chandan's Laal Singh Chaddha, starring Aamir Khan and Kareena Kapoor Khan. In 2023, he did the casting for Commando by Vipul Amrutlal Shah. In the same year, he played a role in Atlee's Jawan, featuring alongside Shah Rukh Khan and Deepika Padukone.

In 2023, Chhabra also did the casting for Rajkumar Hirani's Dunki, starring Shah Rukh Khan, Taapsee Pannu, Vicky Kaushal and Boman Irani. In the same year, he acted and did the casting for Rohit Jugraj's Chamak and Subhash Kapoor's Kafas, featuring Mona Singh and Sharman Joshi. Chhabra also served as the casting director for the ensemble cast of Aditya Dhar's spy action thriller duology Dhurandhar, for which he received praise. Chhabra appeared as a guest judge on the panel of the comedy reality show, India's Got Latent, in 2026.

== Filmography ==
=== As casting director (select films) ===
- Rang De Basanti (2006) – Assistant
- Rockstar (2011)
- Bajrangi Bhaijaan (2015)
- Bombay Velvet (2015)
- Dangal (2016)
- Laila Majnu (2018)
- Dil Bechara (2020)
- Laal Singh Chaddha (2022)
- Jawan (2023)
- Dunki (2023)
- Deva (2025)
- Dhurandhar (2025)
- Dhurandhar: The Revenge (2026)
- Kartavya (2026)
- Main Vaapas Aaunga (2026)
- Governor (2026)
- The Vvaan: Force of the Forrest (2026)
- Ramayana Part 1 (2026)

=== Television ===
- Scam 1992 (2020)
- Commando (2023)
- Chamak (2023)
- Kafas (2023)
- Pritam and Pedro (2026)

=== As film director ===
- Dil Bechara (2020)

=== As actor ===
- Gangs of Wasseypur - Part 2 (2012) as Nawab
- Luv Shuv Tey Chicken Khurana (2012) as Lovely
- Te3n (2016) as Taariq
- Jawan (2023) as Health Minister's secretary
- Chamak (2023–2025) as Dimpy

== Awards and nominations ==
| Year | Award | Category | Result | Ref. |
|---|---|---|---|---|
| 2016 | Stardust Awards | Special Recognition to a Casting Director | Won | |
