= Commando (TV series) =

Indian action thriller series

- Genre: Action-thriller
- Created by: Vipul Amrutlal Shah
- Written by: Krishnan Nallappa; Murali Nallappa; Sanjay Joshi
- Story by: Avinash Singh; Vijay N Verma
- Directed by: Vipul Amrutlal Shah
- Starring: Prem Parija; Adah Sharma; Vaibhav Tatwawadi; Shreya Chaudhary; Mukesh Chhabra; Ishtiyak Khan; Shaji Choudhary; Manini Chadha; Tigmanshu Dhulia; Amit Sial
- Theme music composer: Vikram Montrose
- Country of origin: India
- Original language: Hindi
- No. of seasons: 1
- No. of episodes: 4

Production
- Producer: Vipul Amrutlal Shah
- Production location: India
- Cinematography: Sirsha Ray
- Editor: Steven H. Bernard
- Camera setup: Multi-camera
- Running time: 45 minutes
- Production company: Sunshine Pictures Pvt Ltd

Original release
- Network: Disney+ Hotstar
- Release: 11 August 2023

Commando is a 2023 Indian Hindi-language action thriller television series created and directed by Vipul Amrutlal Shah under the banner of Sunshine Pictures Pvt Ltd. A spin-off of Commando franchise, the series features Prem Parija, Adah Sharma, Vaibhav Tatwawadi, Shreya Chaudhary, Mukesh Chhabra, Ishtiyak Khan, Shaji Choudhary, Manini Chadha, Tigmanshu Dhulia and Amit Sial. It premiered on Disney+ Hotstar on 11 August 2023.

On 23 August 2023, It was reported that the show garnered 10 million views within 12 days of its release.

== Plot ==
When a covert mission in Pakistan goes wrong and his close friend Kshitij Mehra is captured, Commando Virat Singh and his team consisting of Bhavna Reddy and Abbas embarks on a perilous journey to rescue him.

== Cast ==
- Prem Parija as Commando Virat Amrek Singh, Ghatak platoon, Indian army
- Adah Sharma as Bhavana Chukdar Ramireddy, Lieutenant, Madras regiment, Indian army
- Vaibhav Tatwawadi as Kshitij Mehra, Spy of RAW, operating in Punjab, Pakistan
- Shreya Chaudhary as Smita
- Mukesh Chhabra as Abbas Mastan
- Ishtiyak Khan as Sagar Munaf patel, Housekeeping associate in Sahiwal Central Jail, Peshawar, Pakistan
- Shaji Choudhary as Faheem Ashraf
- Manini Chadha as Tina Mehra aka Tinoo
- Tigmanshu Dhulia as Major BK Bakshi, RAW chief
- Amit Sial as Bridg. Gen Jaffer Talah Hassan, Baloch regiment, Pakistan army
- Sangramsingh Thakur as Pakistani Electrician Sahanawaz Dahani
- Amit Bhardwaj as Rehman Bada

== Episodes ==
No.	Title	Directed by	Written by	Original release date
1	"The Dance of Death"	Vipul Amrutlal Shah	Krishnan Nallappa; Murali Nallappa; Sanjay Joshi	11 August 2023
Kshitij Mehra is an Indian spy who is working in a lab near POK, where he gives information to Virat Singh that a virus is planted to destroy India. Jaffer finds out about the mole and arrests him. While RAW is planning to move ahead to ICJ, Pakistan claims that Kshitij is a terrorist and was planning to attack multiple cities in Pakistan.
2	"Bring It On"	Vipul Amrutlal Shah	Krishnan Nallappa; Murali Nallappa; Sanjay Joshi	11 August 2023
Kshitij is kept in Sahiwal jail and is tortured to give away the pen drive using which he secured the advance system of virus. Jaffer challenges RAW to get him released, where Virat plans to get him out of prison by going on a ground mission. On the way, Virat meets Bhavna Reddy and Abbas, who intends to be partners in his mission.
3	"Death Trap"	Vipul Amrutlal Shah	Krishnan Nallappa; Murali Nallappa; Sanjay Joshi	11 August 2023
Virat and his team sketches out a dangerous plan to escape with Kshitij. The evidence of virus in India is destroyed and RAW learns that there is a mole amongst the team. To accelerate movement and kill the rescue team, Jaffer spreads rumours that he is moving Kshitij.
4	"The Great Escape"	Vipul Amrutlal Shah	Krishnan Nallappa; Murali Nallappa; Sanjay Joshi	11 August 2023
With every step being executed as planned, Virat and his team manages to release Kshitij and kidnaps Jaffer. While celebrating, the team plans to destroy the lab and it is revealed that mole in the agency is actually Smita.

== Production ==
In July 2022, Vipul Amrutlal Shah announced Commando franchise in web series for Disney+ Hotstar. The principal photography of the series started in 2022. The casting of the series is done by Mukesh Chhabra, and features Prem Parija in the titular role, and was joined by Adah Sharma as the lead. The trailer of the series was released on 31 July 2023.

== Soundtrack ==
Commando

Soundtrack album by Vikram Montrose
- Released: 2023
- Genre: Soundtrack
- Language: Hindi

Commando is composed by Vikram Montrose and lyrics written by Abhinav Shekhar.

Tracklisting
No.	Title	Lyrics	Music	Singer(s)	Length
1.	"Action Shuru"	Abhinav Shekhar	Vikram Montrose	Abhinav Shekhar, Vikram Montrose

== Reception ==
Shaheen Irani of OTTPlay gave 3/5 stars and wrote "Commando, as a series, is an experiment that has not provided the desired results. You might want to skip it this time and hope that the second season brings a lot better to the table." Archika Khurana of The Times of India gave 2.5/5 stars and wrote "Despite its flaws, the 'Commando' series has enough to entertain action buffs and the climax of the show is a standout moment, leaving viewers curious and eager for a possible next season." Vijayalakshmi Narayanan The Free Press Journal gave 1/5 stars and wrote "With its length being the only attribute that works in its favour, Commando is nothing more than a checklist exercise ticked ahead of a long, national weekend."

== See also ==
- List of Disney+ Hotstar original programming
