= 200: Halla Ho =

Indian Hindi-language Vigilante film

200 Hallo Ho
- Promotional poster
- Directed by: Alok Batra; Sarthak Dasgupta
- Written by: Sarthak Dasgupta; Gaurav Sharma
- Story by: Abhijeet Das; Soumyajit Roy
- Based on: Akku Yadav
- Produced by: Siddharth Anand Kumar; Vikram Mehra
- Starring: Amol Palekar; Barun Sobti; Rinku Rajguru; Flora Saini; Indraneil Sengupta; Upendra Limaye; Saloni Batra; Vinay Hake; Sahana Vasudevan
- Cinematography: Deep Metkar
- Edited by: Abhishek Seth
- Music by: Anshuman Mukherjee; Prateek Nandan; Abhishek Walimbe
- Production company: Yoodlee films
- Distributed by: ZEE5
- Release date: 20 August 2021
- Running time: 115 minutes
- Country: India
- Language: Hindi

200 Halla Ho is a 2021 Indian Hindi-language crime thriller film directed by Sarthak Dasgupta and Alok Batra (in his directorial debut) with production by Yoodlee films. It was digitally released on 20 August 2021 on ZEE5.

== Plot ==
The film is based on the real life incident in which 200 women lynched Akku Yadav, a gangster, robber, serial rapist, and killer in an open court in Nagpur in 2004.

== Cast ==
- Amol Palekar as Justice Vitthal Daangle
- Barun Sobti as Umesh Joshi
- Ishtiyak Khan as Prof. Avsare
- Sahil Khattar as Bali Choudhary
- Upendra Limaye as Suresh Patil
- Rinku Rajguru as Asha Surve
- Flora Saini as Poornima
- Indraneil Sengupta as IPS, Sameer Deshpande
- Pradhuman Singh as Anwar Sheikh
- Saloni Batra as Purva
- Apurva Choudhari as Jyoti
- Sushama Deshpande as Tarabai Kamble
- Vinay Hake as the Reporter
- Punit Tiwari as Santosh
- Sahana Vasudevan as Neha

== Reception ==
Arushi Jain of The Indian Express gave the film a mixed review and stated, "Though a torpid screenplay fails the subject of the movie, veteran actor Amol Palekar stays committed to the character of a retired Dalit judge. He brings some profundity to a film that lacks depth". Archika Khurana of The Times of India gave the film 3 out of 5 stars and stated, "If you like non-fiction films based on true stories, this drama definitely deserves a watch in order to comprehend the grief and suffering that those women must have endured". Shantanu Ray Chaudhuri of The Free Press Journal gave the film 3 out of 5 stars and stated, "If only it did not wear its activism, its social agenda, on its sleeves, it would have been more than the polemic tract it often feels like".

Saibal Chatterjee of NDTV gave the film 3.5 out of 5 stars and stated, "Drawing strength from a slew of quietly efficient performances, the director parlays the material into an impactful tale of crime and punishment that transcends genre limitations". News 18 praised its "decent" production values, tone, pacing, "powerful" performances and "dramatic" direction.
