= Sanjana Sanghi =

Indian actress and model (born 1996)

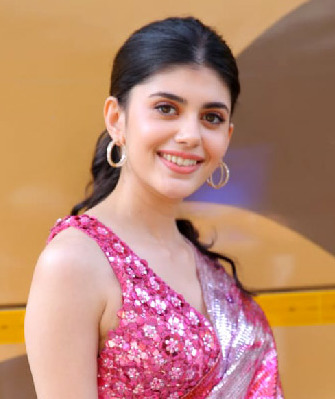
- Sanghi in 2021
- Born: 2 September 1996 (age 29); Delhi, India
- Education: Lady Shri Ram College, Delhi
- Occupations: Actress; model
- Years active: 2011–present

Sanjana Sanghi (born 2 September 1996) is an Indian actress and model who works in Hindi films. She made her acting debut as a child artist in the 2011 film Rockstar and after appearing in a few supporting roles, she had her breakthrough with the romantic drama film Dil Bechara (2020). Sanghi has since starred in Rashtra Kavach Om (2022), Dhak Dhak (2023) and Kadak Singh (2023).

== Early life ==
Sanjana Sanghi was born on 2 September 1996 in Delhi, India to businessman Sandeep Sanghi and homemaker Shagun. She has a brother, Sumer. She studied at Modern School in Delhi and then completed her graduation in Journalism and Mass communication from Lady Shri Ram College, Delhi in 2017.

== Career ==
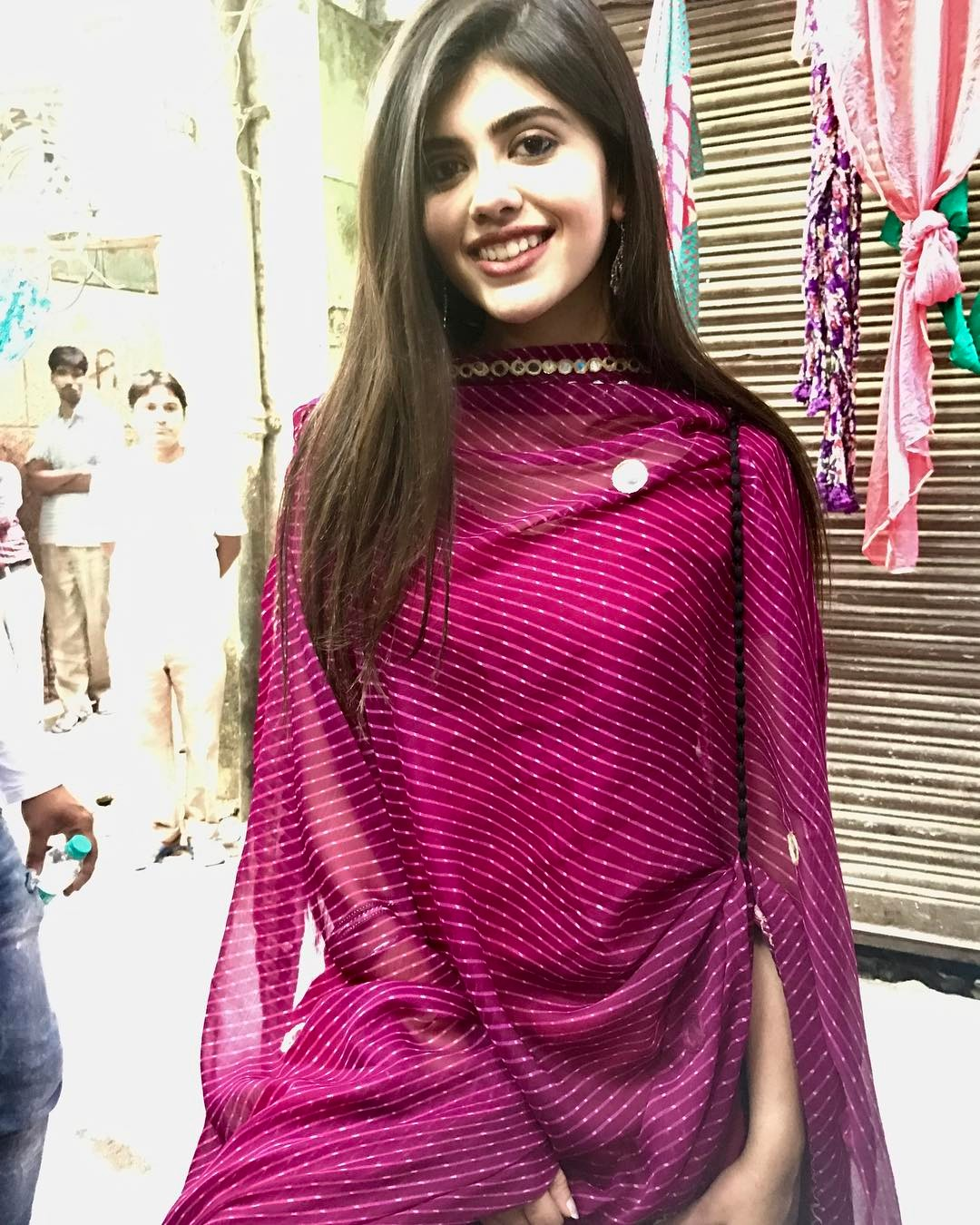
Sanghi on the set of Hindi Medium in 2017

=== Early work (2011–2017) ===
Sanghi made her acting debut in Imtiaz Ali's romantic drama film Rockstar in 2011. She was cast by Mukesh Chhabra after he saw her performing on stage at her school. In 2016, she played student in Jai's classroom in Baar Baar Dekho. In 2017, she played Katty in Fukrey Returns and the younger role of Saba Qamar in Hindi Medium.

=== Lead roles (2018–present) ===
In 2018, she was chosen as the female lead for Dil Bechara, in the remake of 2014 American film The Fault in Our Stars, starring alongside Sushant Singh Rajput. The film released in 2020 on Disney+Hotstar.

Sanghi next featured in Kapil Verma's action drama Rashtra Kavach Om alongside Aditya Roy Kapur. The movie was released in July 2022. In 2023, she played the role of a first time solo traveller in the film Dhak Dhak. She was next seen in Kadak Singh and Woh Bhi Din The.

== Filmography ==
=== Films ===
Key
†	Denotes films that are in production

Year	Title	Role	Notes	Ref.
2011	Rockstar	Mandy Kaul		
2016	Baar Baar Dekho	Student	Cameo appearance	
2017	Hindi Medium	Young Meeta	Cameo appearance	
2017	Fukrey Returns	Katty		
2020	Dil Bechara	Kizie Basu		
2022	Uljhe Hue	Rasika	Short film	
2022	Rashtra Kavach Om	Kavya Sharma		
2023	Dhak Dhak	Manjari		
2023	Kadak Singh	Sakshi Shrivastav		
2024	Woh Bhi Din The	Malaika "Milky"		
2026	Hitman †	TBA	Filming	

=== Music video appearances ===
Year	Title	Singer	Ref.
2020	"Never Say Goodbye"	A. R. Ameen	
2021	"Mehendi Wale Hath"	Guru Randhawa	

== Awards and nominations ==
Year	Award	Category	Film	Result	Ref.
2023	Iconic Gold Awards	Millennial Star on Rise	Rashtra Kavach Om	Won	
