= Sangramsingh Thakur =

Indian film actor

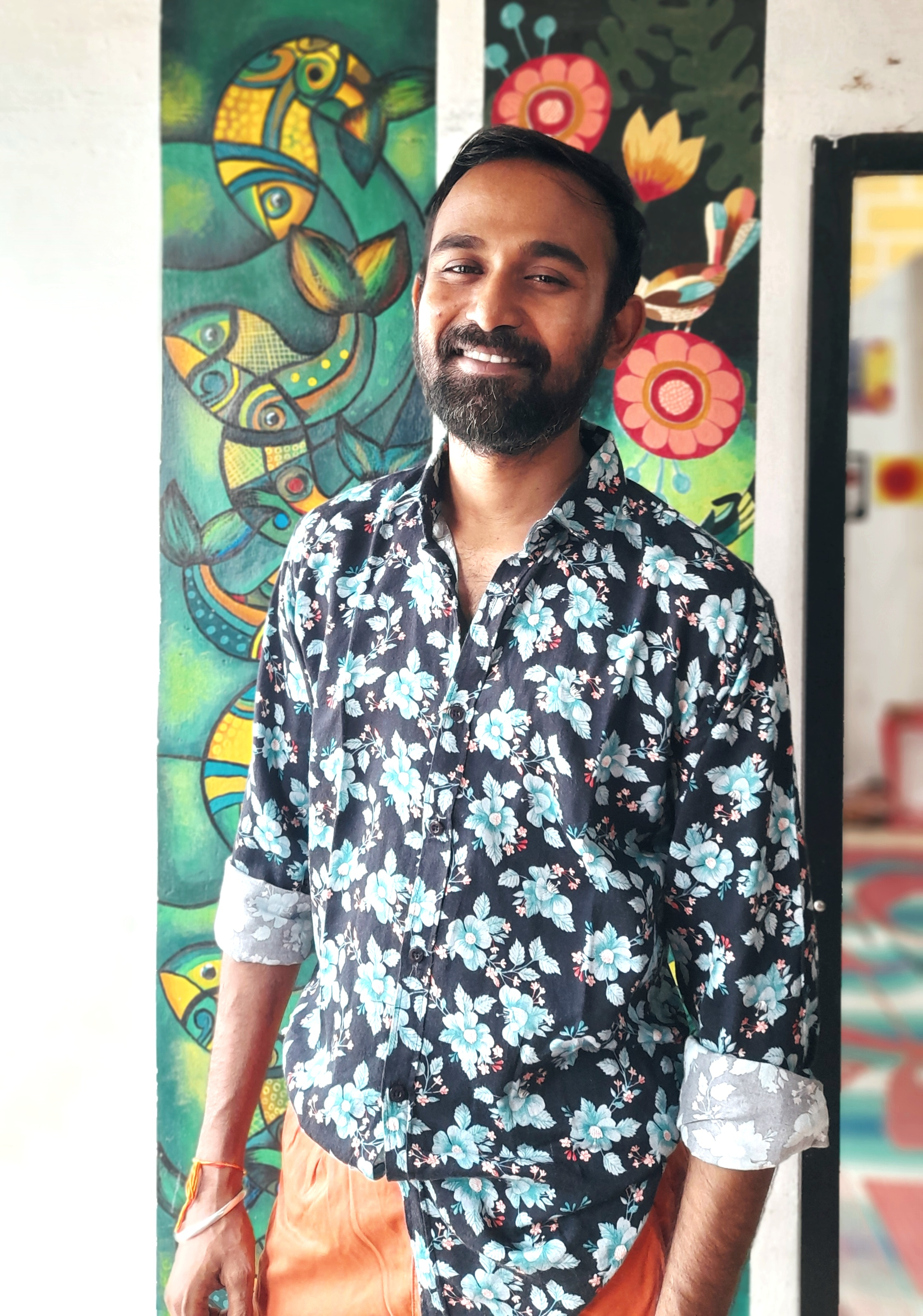
- 2023
- Born: 19 May 1990 (age 36); Amravati, Maharashtra, India.
- Occupation: Actor
- Years active: 2009–present
- Spouse: Shilpa Thakur
- Children: Rudrapratapsingh Thakur

Sangramsingh Thakur (born 19 May 1990) is an Indian film actor. He is known for his work in Indian Predator: Murder in a Courtroom, directed by Umesh Vinayak Kulkarni, and Vipul Amrutlal Shah's, Commando Web Series. He also worked in the Marathi film Ghaath and appeared in the Times Music and Zee Music Video albums.

== Early life ==
Sangramsingh Thakur was born in Amravati, Maharashtra, to Rajkumarsingh Thakur and Vanita Thakur. After the death of his father, when he was 10, he moved from Amravati to Nagpur with his mother and siblings. On 20 January 2014, he married Shilpa Thakur.

== Career ==
Thakur started his acting career in 2009, but he got his first chance in Abhijit Kokate’s film Rakkhosh with Sanjay Mishra in 2016. He worked on a web series titled Drishtibhram, which was released in 2019. After this, he did the Netflix documentary Indian Predator: Murder in a Courtroom, produced by Vice Media and directed by Umesh Vinayak Kulkarni. He recently worked in the Disney Plus Hotstar series Commando, directed by Vipul Amrutlal Shah. His upcoming film is Ghaath, produced by Platoon One Films and Drishyam Films and directed by Chhatrapal Ninawe alongside Milind Shinde and Jitendra Joshi. The film premiered at the 73rd Berlin International Film Festival.

== Filmography ==
=== Films ===
Year	Title	Language	Notes
2023	Commando ( TV Series )	Hindi	
2023	Ghaath	Marathi	Upcoming
2022	Indian Predator Season 3	Hindi/Marathi	
2022	Angutha	Marathi	
2021	Kinaryavarchi Shala	Marathi	
2019	Rakkhosh	Hindi	
2019	Drishtibhram	Hindi	

=== Music video ===
Year	Title	Label	Language	Notes
2019	Pranamya Shirsa Devam	Times Music	Hindi	
2020	Kumbharacha Ganpati	Zee Music	Marathi	
