= Big Day Out (disambiguation) =

Big Day Out is an annual music festival.

Big Day Out may also refer to:

- Big Day Out, a children's book by Jacqueline Wilson
- Boolar's Big Day Out, a children's book by Sally Gardner
- Blue Peter "Big Day Out Competition"

== See also ==
- Big Day (disambiguation)
- Big Gay Out, a non-profit LGBT fair day in Auckland, New Zealand
