= Woh Bhi Din The =

2024 Indian film by Sajid Ali

- Official Release Poster
- Directed by: Sajid Ali
- Written by: Sajid Ali; Saurabh Swamy
- Produced by: John Abraham; Shoojit Sircar; Ronnie Lahiri; Sheel Kumar
- Starring: Rohit Saraf; Adarsh Gourav; Sanjana Sanghi; Ashvin Mathew; Samarth Vishal; Charu Bedi
- Cinematography: Jay I. Patel
- Edited by: Manan Sagar
- Music by: Joi Barua
- Production companies: JA Entertainment; Kino Works; Rising Sun Films
- Distributed by: ZEE5
- Release date: 29 March 2024 (India)
- Running time: 126 minutes
- Country: India
- Language: Hindi

Woh Bhi Din The is a 2024 Hindi-language coming of age romantic comedy film written by Sajid Ali, Saurabh Swamy and directed by Sajid Ali. The film was produced by John Abraham, Shoojit Sircar, Ronnie Lahiri, and Sheel Kumar under the banner of JA Entertainment, Kino Works, and Rising Sun Films. The film features Rohit Saraf, Adarsh Gourav, Sanjana Sanghi and Charu Bedi as lead characters.

== Cast ==
- Rohit Saraf as Rahul Sinha
- Adarsh Gourav as Joyjeet "Joy" Ganguly
- Sanjana Sanghi as Malaika "Milky"
- Charu Bedi as ‘Shalini’
- Zeishan Quadri
- John Abraham as Rahul Sinha (cameo appearance)
- Ashvin Mathew as Alex Sir

== Music ==
The soundtrack is composed by Joi Barua and lyrics is written by Irshad Kamil and Vishwadeep Zeest (noted).

Woh Bhi Din The

Soundtrack album by Joi Barua
- Released: 15 April 2024
- Genre: Feature film soundtrack
- Length: 42:14
- Language: Hindi
- Label: Zee Music Company

Track listing
No.	Title	Singer(s)	Length
1.	"Banjare"	Joi Barua, Rana Mazumder, Manik Batra, Adarsh Gourav	4:00
2.	"Yeh Silsila"	Javed Ali	6:32
3.	"Higher"	Jonita Gandhi	3:06
4.	"Awaargi"	Sunidhi Chauhan	4:45
5.	"Roothoon"	Zubeen Garg, Monali Thakur	4:30
6.	"Adhoore"	Suraj Jagan	4:34
7.	"Woh Bhi Din The"	Amit Mishra, Joi Barua	4:21
8.	"Mujhko Mili" (Lyrics by Vishwadeep Zeest)	Joi Barua	6:34
9.	"Guzarish"	Joi Barua, Jankee Parekh Mehta	3:44
Total length:			42:14

== Release ==
Woh Bhi Din The was released on 29 March 2024, on Zee5 without any theatrical release. It had a delayed release of 11–12 years.

== Reception ==
Abhishek Srivastava of The Times of India rated the film 3 stars out of 5 stars and noted "This school drama possesses all the necessary elements for a great film, yet instead of delivering a delicious experience akin to a biryani, it serves viewers a simpler fare of plain chawal and dal."

Sonal Pandya of Times Now rated the film 2.5 stars out of 5 stars and noted "The film feels at times like a time capsule. A few of its storylines of small-town thinking have become a little dated now, especially in regard to teenage relationships."
