= Chamak (TV series) =

Hindi-language musical web-series

- Genre: Drama
- Directed by: Rohit Jugraj
- Starring: Paramvir Cheema; Isha Talwar; Gippy Grewal; Manoj Pahwa; Mohit Malik; Navneet Nishan
- Country of origin: India
- Original language: Hindi
- No. of seasons: 2
- No. of episodes: 12

Production
- Producers: Rohit Jugraj; Sumeet Dubey; Geetanjali Mehlwal
- Cinematography: Sandeep Yadav
- Editors: Mandar Khanvilkar; Satya Sharma; Rajesh Pandey

Original release
- Network: SonyLIV
- Release: 7 December 2023 – 4 April 2025

Chamak (Translation: Glow) is an Indian musical thriller on SonyLIV, starring Paramvir Singh Cheema, Isha Talwar, Akasa Singh, Manoj Pahwa, Gippy Grewal, Mukesh Chhabra, Mohit Malik, Prince Kanwaljit Singh and other artists from Hindi as well as Punjabi film industry.

The series features 15 songs performed by 14 artists, including Gippy Grewal, Sunidhi Chauhan, Mika Singh, Afsana Khan, Asees Kaur, and MC Square, among others.

Directed and co-created by Rohit Jugraj, Chamak is currently streaming on SonyLIV, with 6 episodes featuring songs from different genres of music like Punjabi folk, fusion, Desi Hip-Hop, Rap, etc.

The season 2 of the Series, titled Chamak- The Conclusion was released on 4 April 2025.

== Cast ==
- Manoj Pahwa as Pratap Deol
- Gippy Grewal as Tara
- Paramvir Cheema as Kaala
- Mohit Malik as Guru Deol
- Isha Talwar as Jazz
- Navneet Nishan as Rocky Aunty
- Mukesh Chhabra as Dimpy
- Prince Kanwaljit Singh as Jagga
- Suvinder Vicky as Jugal
- Rakesh Bedi as Teja Grewal
- Akasa Singh as Lata
- Mahaveer Bhullar as Satnam
- Hobby Dhaliwal as Baldev
- Jarnail Singh as Mahipal
- Malkit Roni as Amarpal
- Saran Kaur as Navjot
- Aniruddh Roy as Sabharwal Lawyer
- Ankita Goraya as Naaz Deol
- Dhanveer Singh as Jai Deol
- Rajdip Shoker as Roop
- Harvider Kaur as Nancy
- Kapil Redekar as Tidda
- Firoz Ali as Police Commissioner
- MC Square as Real hero

== Synopsis ==
In the series Chamak, a young rapper Kaala leaves Canada for Punjab and discovers that his late father was the singer Tara Singh, who was murdered on stage. As Kaala navigates through the complex landscape of politics, honor killings, and corporate rivalry, he meets Jazz, an aspiring artist. An impromptu rap battle with MC Square elevates Kaala's popularity. However, his journey gets entangled in the web of Teeja Sur, once owned by his father but now in the hands of Pratap. Amidst three compelling theories—political conspiracies, honor killings, or a business takeover - Will he be able to uncover the truth?

=== Episodic synopsis ===
Episode 1: Mat Maari

After being released from a Canadian prison, Kaala flees to Punjab. There, he discovers about the legacy, stardom, and the onstage murder of his late father and iconic singer – Tara Singh. This sparks his quest to track down the culprits behind his parents’ killing.

Episode 2: Khairaat

In the pursuit to uncover the truth, Kaala and a young artist Jazz wander the villages of Punjab, posing as journalists investigating the murder of Tara Singh.

Episode 3: Edar Odar

Kaala meets his grandmother, who challenges him to emulate his father that will lead to the truth. This prompts him to audition at the leading studio - Teeja Sur.

Episode 4: Sunn Zindagi ka Sangeet

Kaala fearlessly meets a friend in Jagga and shares his story, which leads Jagga to introduce him to a music composer, Dimpy at a casino.

Episode 5: Kala Sha Kaala

Kaala confronts Jagga about his relation with Tara Singh, to which Jagga provokes him to rise to glory to seek his revenge.

Episode 6: Chal Uth Kaale

Kaala cleverly manipulates his mentor, Jugal Brar into performing at the Peer Ka Mela for which he dedicatedly practices. There, he boldly reveals his connection to Tara Singh in front of the live audience that sparks widespread outrage all over Punjab.

== Reception ==
Chamak struck a chord with audiences due to its captivating storytelling, soulful music, stellar performances by the entire cast, and an impactful narrative. The series received appreciation not only from viewers but also earned 3.5 stars from The Times Of India, praising it as an 'Engaging mystery thriller enriched by good music,' 4.5 stars from Punjab Kesari commending the lead 'Paramvir shining with a brilliant story & music,' and Navodaya Times stating that 'Chamak promises a weekend of amazing fun from every angle.'
