= Crime Stories: Khoj Apradhi Ki =

Indian crime series

- Genre: Crime
- Written by: Shubham Sharma
- Directed by: R. Amit Kumar Jha
- Starring: K. C. Shankar
- Country of origin: India
- Original language: Hindi
- No. of seasons: 1
- No. of episodes: 30

Production
- Running time: 14 minutes
- Production company: Keylight Productions

Original release
- Release: 13 March 2021

Crime Stories: Khoj Apradhi Ki is a 2021 Indian Hindi-language interactive crime thriller series started on the video streaming platform Flipkart Video from 13 March 2021. It is produced under the banner of Keylight Productions, directed by R. Amit Kumar Jha, and written by Shubham Sharma, who has written for numerous shows like Abhay and TVF Pitchers. The series is a Flipkart Video original that revolves around crime cases inspired by true events and allows viewers to be part of the interrogation in each episode by asking them questions.

== Plot ==
Season 1 consists of 30 short episodes in total, with each episode showcasing a story based on a real incident or crime from across the various parts of India. The episodes are 12–14 minutes in length. The plot rotates around the suspects showing their own probable motive for the crime committed or connected to the victim, making it more challenging to home in on the killer. K. C. Shankar, who appeared in a number of Bollywood films including Dil Dhadakne Do and Mardaani 2, plays Inspector Vikrant Singh and knows how to make the culprit own up. In the episodes, Inspector Vikrant Singh rounds the prime suspects in the interrogation room while he and sub-Inspector Samar Pratap look into the cases and uses an unconventional method to identify the real killer.

== Cast ==
- K. C. Shankar as Inspector Vikrant Singh
- Samar Pratap as sub-Inspector

== Production ==
Flipkart Video Original announced the show's release date as 13 March 2021 along with an eerie teaser on its official YouTube channel on 4 March 2021. A first look poster of the series was subsequently released on Twitter on 6 March 2021. This was followed by a one-minute trailer on 8 March 2021.
