= The Big Day (TV series) =

- Genre: Reality television
- Starring: Divya Singh; Daniel Bauer; Sreejan Shandilya
- Country of origin: India
- Original language: English
- No. of seasons: 2
- No. of episodes: 6

Production
- Running time: 37–45 min

Original release
- Network: Netflix
- Release: 14 February – 7 April 2021

The Big Day is an Indian 2021 reality series created by Netflix starring Divya Singh, Daniel Bauer and Sreejan Shandilya.

== Cast ==
- Divya Singh
- Daniel Bauer
- Sreejan Shandilya
- Itai Reuveni
- Kunwar Sood
- Sanjeet Raman
- Gayeti Singh

== Episodes ==
Series overview
Series	Title	Episodes	Originally released
1	Collection 1	3	14 February 2021
2	Collection 2	3	7 April 2021

=== Season 1 (2021) ===
No. overall	No. in season	Title	Directed by	Written by	Original release date	Prod. code
1	1	"Love Is in the Details"	Aakriti Mehta & Ashish Sawhny	Nikita Deshpande	14 February 2021	101
Focusing on highly personalized details that pay homage to their roots, two couples go all out to make their opulent weddings anything but ordinary.
2	2	"Here Comes the Type A Bride"	Faraz Arif Ansari & Ashish Sawhny	Nikita Deshpande	14 February 2021	102
Replacing old rituals with their new rules, two proudly progressive young women make it clear that the bride is the boss at their respective weddings.
3	3	"All You Need Is Love"	Aakriti Mehta & Ashish Sawhny	Nikita Deshpande	14 February 2021	103
Two modern-day couples reflect evolving perspectives in India with weddings that celebrate the beauty of love without bounds or prejudice.

=== Season 2 (2021) ===
No. overall	No. in season	Title	Directed by	Written by	Original release date	Prod. code
4	1	"Love Beyond Borders"	Faraz Arif Ansari & Ashish Sawhny	Nikita Deshpande	7 April 2021	201
Joyful nuptials turn into toasts to similarities for two interracial couples as they embrace differences and embody the unifying power of love.
5	2	"A Family Affair"	Ashish Sawhny	Nikita Deshpande	7 April 2021	202
Beginning with setups by the parents, two contemporary arranged marriages showcase how the ultimate big fat Indian wedding is incomplete without family.
6	3	"It's Not the Journey, It's the Destination"	Ashish Sawhny	Nikita Deshpande	7 April 2021	203
From the Middle East to Malaysia, couples and planners navigate logistical labyrinths to stage their elaborate, exclusive destination Indian weddings.
