= Indian Predator: The Butcher of Delhi =

2022 Netflix Indian docuseries

- Genre: True crime docuseries
- Created by: Ayesha Sood
- Directed by: Ayesha Sood
- Creative directors: Nandita Gupta; Tushar Jain; Arun Bhatia
- Starring: Altaf Hussain; Bunny Adhikari; Mukesh Pandey; Ankit Sharma; Manjit Singh; Sanjay Bansal
- Theme music composer: Salvage Audio Collective; Ayush Abuja
- Composer: Salvage Audio Collective
- Country of origin: India
- Original language: Hindi
- No. of episodes: 3

Production
- Executive producers: Srusti Jain; Nandita Gupta
- Producers: Sanmira Kanwar; Ashwin Rai Shetty; Vatsala Aron; Niharika Kotwal
- Cinematography: Linesh Desai
- Editor: Anupama Chabukswar
- Running time: 41– 44 minutes
- Production companies: Vice; India Today

Original release
- Network: Netflix
- Release: 20 July 2022

Indian Predator: The Butcher of Delhi is an Indian Netflix true crime docuseries which premiered on 20 July 2022. Produced by VICE India and directed by Ayesha Sood, The Butcher of Delhi explores both the police investigation and the motives of Chandrakant Jha, a serial killer who, in 2006–2007, left three decapitated victims outside the Tihar Jail accompanied by mocking notes.

The first installment of a proposed Indian Predator series, The Butcher of Delhi received mixed reviews. Although some critics praised the mystery, pacing and departure from the whodunit format, others criticized its perceived cliché representation of Jha and overrepresentation of police accounts, lack of depth, poor flow and excessive exposition.

== Premise ==
Indian Predator: The Butcher of Delhi is a three-episode true crime docuseries. The first episode follows officer Sunder Singh's investigation and arrest of Chandrakant Jha, a serial killer who, in 2006–2007, left three decapitated victims outside the Tihar Jail in Delhi, India accompanied by mocking notes challenging the police to catch him before his next murder. Later episodes explore Jha's life, backstory and motives, much of which was told by Jha during the police interview after his arrest. The Butcher of Delhi features interviews of people involved or close to the case, such as officers and journalists, interspersed with dramatizations of police exchanges, archival photographs and recreations.

== Cast ==
=== Actors ===
- Altaf Hussain as Chandrakant Jha
  - Mukesh Pandy as Jha's voice
  - Jitendra Sharma as a young Jha
- Manjit Singh as Sunder Singh
- Sanjay Bansal as Pandit
- Bunny Adhikari as Anil Mandal
- Meenu as Mamta
- Ankit Sharma as Dalip Kaushik
- Joginder Sharma as Hoshiyar Singh
- Pankaj Sharma as Narendra Kumar
- Shivam as Jarnil Singh

=== Interviewees ===
- Surinder Singh Yadav, investigating officer of the case
- S.L. Vaya, a clinical forensic scientist and psychologist

== Episodes ==
No.	Title	Directed by	Original release date
1	Episode 1	Ayesha Sood	20 July 2022
In 2006, a stranger leaves a beheaded body outside a Delhi jail with a note challenging the police to catch him. It isn't his first — or last — murder.
2	Episode 2	Ayesha Sood	20 July 2022
During interrogations, Chandrakant shares his fraught history with the police. Investigators face a challenging search for conclusive evidence.
3	Episode 3	Ayesha Sood	20 July 2090
Ghosai residents offer powerful accounts and photos from Chandrakant's past. Experts discuss the case's mental health and social implications.

== Production ==
=== Development ===
"[Indian Predator] was a collaboration between Vice and Netflix, it was an umbrella series. They had come up with a pool of stories and one of them was this. It wasn’t picked because it was gruesome or grotesque, it was picked because the nature of the crime was audacious and something so audacious, gruesome, or brutal was not really heard or talked about. The fact that it was unseen was one of the key reasons."

— Ayesha Sood, interviewed by News18

The Indian Predator series was first announced in March 2021 in a press release by Netflix and Vice Studios, which also reported three additional directors for later installments alongside Ayesha Sood: Umesh Kulkarni, Ashwin Shetty and Dheeraj Jindal. The Butcher of Delhi is the first of this series, which will also follow other Indian true crime cases. Indian Predator was among over forty Indian productions that Netflix India announced that year, and follows several previous Indian true crime series for Netflix such as House of Secrets: The Burari Deaths (2021). In an interview for the Royal Television Society, Vice Studios' president Kate Ward characterized such documentaries as a "big opportunity" for Vice.

Director Ayesha Sood stated that, around May 2020, Vice approached her to direct Indian Predator and presented her with potential cases to adapt. She chose the case of Chandrakant Jha as she found it "very intriguing" and was surprised that she did not know of it despite living in Delhi. She later elaborated that she picked it because it was "something so audacious, gruesome, or brutal [that it was not] really heard or talked about".

=== Research and filming ===
The development team, led by Nandita Gupta, went through a long phase of research and interviews, guided by Vice and Netflix's legal team. Sood said that it "led [her] to discover a lot about human psychology and the justice system". The research team gradually contacted all persons involved with Jha or the case known from the case files. During interviews, Sood found it "tough" to discern factual information from interviewees and was the production team were careful to cut various material. In an interview for News18, she noted that the interviewees were "very cooperative" and the Delhi Police shared various files and materials with them. She told Cinema Express that some sources backed out of being recorded "at the last moment", but many villagers would instead give her details in person. Sood attempted to interview Jha, but could speak only to his lawyer as cameras are unable to be brought into Tihar Jail. The team also visited Jha's residence in Delhi, but were not allowed to shoot there by the landlord; this experience was described by Sood as "haunting".

The Butcher of Delhi features dramatizations of police exchanges and investigations with Jha that, according to Sood, were all completely based on archival material. Interspersed in between the interviews are both archival photographs of crime scenes and recreations and reenactments of the events being described.

=== Marketing ===
The producers refrained in revealing the actual case The Butcher of Delhi is based on prior to its release. The trailer for the series was released on 28 June 2022 on Netflix India's official YouTube channel and now has over three million views. The channel also released other short teasers prior to the release date.

== Release ==
The three episodes of Indian Predator: The Butcher of Delhi premiered on Netflix on 20 July 2022.

== Reception ==
The miniseries received mixed reviews. Abhimanyu Mathur of Hindustan Times praised The Butcher of Delhi and compared it above other Netflix Indian true crime series, noting that it builds mystery around Jha's motives and actions instead of following a typical whodunit format. Joel Keller of Decider noted that "The show gets to the point... [it] doesn’t pad its runtime with off-topic examinations of the time period or unnecessary biographical sketches". M.N. Miller of Ready Steady Cut praised Sood's direction and how The Butcher of Delhi "gets into the head of the killer", as did Bhavya Sadhwani of India Times, who noted the impartial narration.

Veronica Loop of Martin Cid Magazine praised its style and pacing, saying The Butcher of Delhi was "hefty, truculent, and provocative". Ameen of Leisurebyte drew attention to how it "puts forward the reality of the lower strata of the society who are so beaten down by the people above them and how even justice is not on their side in most cases, even neglects them".

In contrast, Bhuvanesh Chandar of The Hindu found the show to be cliché, describing its exploration of both the events and Jha's motives and life as "shallow and unconvincing". Chandar concludes that The Butcher of Delhi "clearly stays away from Chandrakant's accusations of police brutality" and that "[ultimately] milking the shock value of a criminal case only gets you so far". Tanvi Trehan of ThePrint echoed Chandar's complaints, saying that the series "fails to question the police", but praised Singh's recount. Nandini Ramnath of Scroll.in also reflected Trehan's sentiments, and Pratikshya Mishra of The Quint felt that The Butcher of Delhi was "derailed by its [sensationalist] approach", somewhat addressing the need for police reform but "immediately countering it".

Although ultimately recommending The Butcher of Delhi, praising it as "intriguing" and depicting a "brutality and disrespect of life that is very hard to relate to", Karina Adelgaard of Heaven in Horror said that the first episode was "messy" and questioned the reliability of the police accounts. Poulomi Das of Firstpost said that the show followed the same "frustrating template" as Netflix's other Indian true crime series—"[building] itself around a gruesome, headline-grabbing case [then proceeding] to use the police investigation to paint a selective portrait of the societal inequalities that breeds criminals... [In] their attempt to cover multiple vantage points of one single crime, these documentaries overcrowd their own narratives, often rushing through points instead of making any." Das also criticized the pacing, "unimaginative" filmmaking and exposition. He concludes "that the series is content with endorsing the official version of events couldn’t be any more obvious. It’s exactly why Indian Predator: The Butcher of Delhi lacks the thrills."

Many critics compared it both favorably and unfavorably to House of Secrets: The Burari Deaths (2021), either as being similar to it or not being able to meet its standards.

== Franchise ==
Indian Predator: The Butcher of Delhi is the first of a proposed Indian Predator series which follows other Indian true crime cases on the same title. It was followed by Indian Predator: The Diary of a Serial Killer and Indian Predator: Murder in a Courtroom. Later the series was revived for another instalment called Indian Predator: Beast of Bangalore.
