= Indian Predator: Murder in a Courtroom =

2022 Netflix Indian docuseries

- Genre: True crime docuseries
- Based on: Akku Yadav
- Directed by: Umesh Vinayak Kulkarni
- Creative director: Nidhi Girish Salian
- Country of origin: India
- Original languages: Hindi and Marathi
- No. of seasons: 1
- No. of episodes: 3

Production
- Executive producer: Samira Kanwar Niharika Kotwal Ashwin Shetty Vatsala Aron
- Producer: Vice India
- Cinematography: Deepti Gupta Savita Singh
- Editor: Monisha Baldawa
- Running time: 40 – 50 minutes
- Production company: VICE Media

Original release
- Network: Netflix
- Release: 28 October 2022

Indian Predator: Murder in a Courtroom is a docuseries, based on the true story of the lynching of Bharat Kalicharan Yadav (aka Akku Yadav), by women who had been raped by him, in Nagpur, Maharashtra. He raped more than 40 women who lived in Kasturba Nagar, Nagpur.

== Overview ==
Indian Predator: Murder in a Courtroom is a Netflix original documentary series with three episodes. The whole series is narrated by Vilas Bhande and Resha Raut, who are both accused of Akku Yadav's murder. In 1997, Akku Yadav killed his best friend Avinash Tiwari, and after two years, he killed Asha Bhagat, who sold liquor in Kasturba Nagar, Nagpur. On 13 August 2004, 200 women of Kasturba Nagar killed Akku Yadav in Court No. 7 of the District court of Nagpur because he raped more than 40 women.

== Cast ==
- Happy Kalizpuria (Akku Yadav)
- Sangramsingh Thakur (Avinash Tiwari)

== See also ==
- Indian Predator: The Butcher of Delhi, Indian Predator: The Diary of a Serial Killer, 2022 Netflix docudramas, part of the same television franchise
