= Crime Stories: India Detectives =

2021 Netflix documentary series

- Genre: Documentary
- Developed by: Jack Warrender
- Directed by: N Amit; Jack Rampling
- Presented by: Jack Warrender
- Starring: N. Shashi Kumar; Roopa K.S.; Gopala Nayak
- Composers: Antonio Pinto; Felipe Kim
- Country of origin: India
- Original language: Kannada
- No. of seasons: 1
- No. of episodes: 4

Production
- Executive producers: Morgan Matthews; Fiona Stourton
- Producer: Claire Cahill
- Editors: Jules Cornell; Ella Newton
- Running time: 59–63 minutes
- Production company: Minnow Films

Original release
- Network: Netflix
- Release: 22 September 2021

Crime Stories: India Detectives is a 2021 Indian Netflix original docuseries created and directed by N Amit and Jack Rampling.The series was produced by Claire Cahill under the production banner Minnow Films. It stars N. Shashi Kumar, Roopa K. S. and Gopala Nayak. This four episodes Docu-series chronicles the workings of the Bengaluru city police as they attempt to solve four violent crimes; Three are related to murder and one involves the kidnapping of a child. It released via Netflix on 22 September 2021.

== Synopsis ==
The series follows an investigating team of four police stations who cracked three murders and one kidnapping case that came to light in early 2020 before the pandemic.

== Cast ==
- N. Shashi Kumar as Deputy Commissioner of Police
- Roopa K.S. as Sub Inspector
- Gopala Nayak as Police inspector
- V. Dhananjaya as Assistant Commissioner of Police
- B.N. Lohith as Police Inspector
- Latha Mahesh as Sub Inspector

== Episodes ==
No.	Title	Directed by	Original release date
1	"A Murdered Mother"	Jack Warrender	22 September 2021
A middle-aged women is murdered. Her adult son is injured. The injured son blames his sister and the cop investigation begins.
2	"Body In a Bag"	Jack Warrender	22 September 2021
DCP Shashi Kumar and Inspector Lohith find a dead body of a man. The man's mother believes that her son's wife and mother-in-law did it for the money.
3	"Dying for Protection"	Jack Warrender	22 September 2021
A women is found murdered inside her house while her son is out.
4	"The Stolen Baby"	Jack Warrender	22 September 2021
A one-year old baby is kidnapped and the parents believe a friend did it.

== Release ==
On 14 September 2021, Netflix released the official trailer of the series. The series was worldwide premiered on 22 September 2021.

== Reception ==
Nandini Ramnath from Scroll.in gave a mixed review to the series and stated, "From murders to kidnapping, the hard-working, dedicated, intelligent, honest and caring men and women ensure that justice is served – at least, that’s what the show badly wants us to believe."

Karnataka newspaper, Deccan Herald gave 4/5 rating to the series, with a positive verdict and called, "This docu-series is more detailed and takes an intimate look at the criminal justice system as a whole, and policemen's careers marked with risk and uncertainty."

Anuj Kumar from The Hindu newspaper portal said, "Unlike the crime shows on general entertainment channels, here, craft gets as much importance as the cause. On a fundamental level, the four-episode series seeks to understand the anatomy of a crime, finding a beating heart inside the uniform; a human story in the First Information Report."

== Legal issues ==
On 2 October 2021, Karnataka High Court passed an interim order restricting Netflix from airing the first episode of the series, titled "A Murdered Mother", based on the plea made by one of the accused.

On 27 October 2021, the episode was again started streaming after HC dismissed the petition filed by Shridhar Rao, (a 28-year-old co-accused in the murder of 54-year-old Nirmala Chandrasekhar.)
