= Indian Predator: The Diary of a Serial Killer =

2022 Netflix Indian docuseries

- Genre: True crime docuseries
- Written by: Sudeep Nigam
- Directed by: Dheeraj Jindal
- Creative director: Moumita Sen
- Music by: Ishaan Chabbra
- Country of origin: India
- Original language: Hindi
- No. of episodes: 3

Production
- Executive producer: Chandni Ahlawat Dabas
- Producer: India Today
- Cinematography: Pratham Mehta
- Editor: Sourabh Prabhudesai
- Running time: 37 – 44 minutes
- Production company: India Today

Original release
- Network: Netflix
- Release: 7 September 2022

Indian Predator: The Diary of a Serial Killer is an Indian Netflix true crime docuseries which premiered on 7 September 2022. Produced by India Today Group and directed by Dheeraj Jindal. It is the second installment of Indian Predator series.

== Premise ==
This docuseries is inspired by the notorious case of Raja Kolander, who is thought to be a cannibal and is responsible for the deaths of more than 15 people in eastern Uttar Pradesh. It consists of three episodes, and its timeline begins in the year 2000, when Dhirendra Singh, a journalist based in Allahabad, vanished without a trace. But later his decapitated and mutilated body was found in the neighbouring state of Madhya Pradesh.

== Episodes ==
- Episode 1: The Murderer
- Episode 2: The Cannibal
- Episode 3: The King

== Reception ==
Writing for The Indian Express, Rohan Naahar in his review suggest that "The Diary of a Serial Killer has one key ingredient that separates it from its predecessor: an on-camera interview with the serial killer himself."

The Hindu's Bhuvanesh Chandar, a senior sub-editor of the paper in his review suggests " (the docuseries) ... is a chilling exploration into the darkest of corners of the human mind. There is a strong narrative structure in place — there is a reason why the series begins and ends with Dheerendra’s murder in particular— and it also resists employing cheap gimmicks to elevate drama or fear."

== See also ==
- Indian Predator: The Butcher of Delhi, Indian Predator: Murder in a Courtroom, part of the same television franchise
