= List of Al Jazeera Media Network presenters =

The following is a list of presenters with Al Jazeera Media Network, the international news conglomerate, based in Doha and financed by the Qatari government. In recent years Al Jazeera developed a presence in the global English-language broadcasting sector, firstly with the Al Jazeera English channel and then with the purchase of Current TV, which led to the launch of the United States–based Al Jazeera America in 2013.

This list includes former employees as well as the current presenters:

- Dareen Abughaida
- Hashem Ahelbarra
- Charlie Angela
- Winsyon Murphy
- Mohamed Adow
- Malika Bilal
- Marwan Bishara
- Richelle Carey
- Nick Clark
- Stephen Cole
- Peter Dobbie
- Jane Dutton
- Ghida Fakhry
- Adrian Finighan
- Martine Dennis
- Lisa Fletcher
- Everton Fox
- Steve Gaisford
- Imran Garda
- Steff Gaulter
- Shiulie Ghosh
- Richard Gizbert
- Divya Gopalan
- Kimberly Halkett
- Laila Harrak
- Tony Harris
- Mehdi Hasan
- Fauziah Ibrahim
- Darren Jordon
- Rizwan Khan
- Frankie McCamley
- Hamish Macdonald
- Julie MacDonald
- Raheela Mahomed
- Rob Matheson
- Rob McElwee
- Halla Mohieddeen
- Teymoor Nabili
- Anand Naidoo
- Maryam Nemazee
- Femi Oke
- Rageh Omaar
- Marga Ortigas
- Shahnaz Pakravan
- Amanda Palmer
- Verónica Pedrosa
- Louisa Pilbeam
- Barnaby Phillips
- Elizabeth Puranam
- Faisal al-Qassem
- Robert Reynolds
- Andy Richardson
- Josh Rushing
- Maleen Saeed
- Kamahl Santamaria
- Shakuntala Santhiran
- Nick Schifrin
- Mark Seddon
- Barbara Serra
- Sherine Tadros
- Nastasya Tay
- Sue Turton
- Lauren Taylor
- Folly Bah Thibault
- Cyril Vanier
- Kim Vinnell
- Sebastian Walker
- Sami Zeidan
- Sandra Gathmann

== Al Jazeera America ==
- Josh Bernstein
- Jonathan Betz
- Chris Bury
- Richelle Carey
- Melissa Chan
- Joie Chen
- Eboni Deon
- Lisa Fletcher
- Jami Floyd
- Lori Jane Gliha
- Tony Harris
- Marc Lamont Hill
- Avi Lewis
- Sheila MacVicar
- Dave Marash
- Adam May
- Nichole Mitchell
- Antonio Mora
- Soledad O'Brien
- Femi Oke
- Randall Pinkston
- Christof Putzel
- Ash-har Quraishi
- Morgan Radford
- Josh Rushing
- Roxana Saberi
- Cara Santa Maria
- Nick Schifrin
- John Seigenthaler
- Michael Shure
- David Shuster
- John Henry Smith
- Ray Suarez
- Stephanie Sy
- Ali Velshi
- Mike Viqueira
- Sebastian Walker
- Amy Walters
- Jacob Ward

== Al Jazeera Balkans ==
- Anne-Marie Alves-Ćurčić
- Jakov Avram
- Aleksandar Ćeramilac
- Saša Delić
- Dalija Hasanbegović
- Jasmina Kos
- Irena Kuldija
- Jelena Milutinović
- Adnan Rondić

== See also ==
- List of Qatar-related topics
- List of television presenters
- List of television reporters
