= Al Jazeera America News =

- Title Card
- Also known as: News
- Genre: News program
- Presented by: Various Presenters
- Country of origin: United States
- Original language: English

Production
- Production locations: Al Jazeera America Broadcast Center, New York, New York
- Running time: 1 hour with 30 minute editions and a morning program

Original release
- Network: Al Jazeera America
- Release: August 20, 2013 – April 12, 2016

Al Jazeera America News, also referred to as Al Jazeera America Newshour or simply (Weekend) News, is a news program that aired on Al Jazeera America. The program aired several times a day on Al Jazeera America and was supplemented with Newshour from Al Jazeera English. The two programs often shared international correspondents. The program, featured national, international news, weather, technology and sports reports, was known to carry more international news items per broadcast than any other domestic news program.

It aired largely in one-hour blocks at 7 pm Eastern/4 pm Pacific, 8 pm Eastern/5 pm Pacific and 10 pm Eastern/7 pm Pacific. 30 minute blocks aired around the clock at various other times. There was also a morning block from 8am until 12pm Eastern time. All news broadcasts were live, something largely uncommon among most U.S. cable news outlets.

It was modeled after Newshour on Al Jazeera English, however unlike its sister channel, all of Al Jazeera America's news broadcasts originated from New York.

== Past Anchors ==
=== New York ===
==== Anchors ====
- Jonathan Betz
- Richelle Carey
- Imran Garda – fill-in anchor
- Tony Harris
- Adam May – fill-in anchor
- Antonio Mora
- John Seigenthaler
- David Shuster – fill-in anchor
- John Henry Smith
- Stephanie Sy - Morning News
- Del Walters - Morning News
- Morgan Radford
- Barbara Serra

==== Meteorologists ====
- Nicole Mitchell – meteorologist

==== Other ====
- Randall Pinkston – newsroom correspondent
- Jacob Ward – science & technology
