= Vanguard (TV series) =

- Title Card
- Genre: Journalism
- Starring: Christof Putzel; Mariana van Zeller; Adam Yamaguchi
- Narrated by: Correspondent of episode
- Country of origin: United States
- Original language: English
- No. of seasons: 6
- No. of episodes: 62 (including a special interview with Laura Ling)

Production
- Executive producers: Adam Yamaguchi; Jim Fraenkel
- Running time: approx. 44 minutes (without commercials)

Original release
- Network: Current TV
- Release: 2008 – 2013

Related
- America Tonight, Fault Lines

Vanguard is a television documentary series that was broadcast on the now defunct Current TV television network. Vanguard reported on such issues as the environment, drugs, and the effects of globalization and conflict.

The focus of most Vanguard episodes is to explore and immerse viewers in global issues that have a large social significance. Unlike sound-bite driven reporting, the show's correspondents conduct interviews with affected people, and the regions involved are usually led by a guide and translator who facilitate access. Since Vanguard's subject matter often involves exposés about organized crime, drug trafficking, and armed revolts, the correspondents can face significant danger because of their reporting due to unstable political or security situations.

Vanguard has received some of the media industry's highest honors for journalism, including the 69th Annual Peabody Award, given for excellence in electronic media, and the 2010 Television Academy Honor, which recognizes "achievements in programming that present issues of concern to our society in a compelling, and emotional and insightful way." Vanguard has also been awarded the 2009 Alfred I. duPont-Columbia Award and the 2009 Livingston Award, and has been nominated four times for a News and Documentary Emmy Award and also for a Sports Emmy Award.

Vice president of the Vanguard journalism unit Laura Ling and her colleague Euna Lee were detained in North Korea after they allegedly crossed into North Korea from the People's Republic of China without a visa. They were subsequently pardoned after former U.S. President Bill Clinton flew to North Korea to meet with Kim Jong-il. They were producing a piece for Vanguard at the time of their detainment, as shown in a Vanguard episode titled "Captive in North Korea."

In April 2012, Current announced that it would produce six new episodes of Vanguard. However, according to their own Facebook page, apparently only two episodes were created in season 6 before the Vanguard series was ended, falling 4 episodes short of their originally announced plan. The Vanguard homepage and blog, a section of Current TV's website, were also ended when the Current TV website was shut down.

In 2013 Al Jazeera Media Network bought Current TV and, after several months, created Al Jazeera America. The new channel took what remained of Vanguard's team and merged them into Al Jazeera's investigative unit and the America Tonight team. Christof Putzel continues on at Al Jazeera America as a correspondent on the investigative reporting series America Tonight.

== Episodes ==
=== Season 1 ===
Episode Number	Episode Title	Correspondent	Description
1	A Day With the Tribe	Laura Ling	Brazilian tribe
2	The Meth Trail	Christof Putzel	Methamphetamine in the gay community
3	Diving Too Deep	Mariana van Zeller	Depletion of lobsters in Nicaragua
4	Death Train	Mariana van Zeller	Illegal immigrants from Central America
5	Rebels in the Pipeline	Mariana van Zeller	Nigeria's oil-rich Niger Delta
6	From Russia With Hate	Christof Putzel	Growing Neo-Nazi movement in Russia
7	Elixir of the Toxic Frog	Mariana van Zeller	The Kambo frog could hold secrets for modern medicine
8	Prison Power Play	Laura Ling	Prison gang politics
9	Saving Madagascar	Adam Yamaguchi	Environmental issues in Madagascar
10	Blood Roses and Deadly Diamonds	Mariana van Zeller	Unromantic truth behind two symbols of love
11	Scarf Wars	Laura Ling	Extremes of enforcing separation of church and state in Turkey
12	Lost in Democracy	Christof Putzel	Bhutan
13	City on Steroids	Adam Yamaguchi	Chongqing
14	End of the Road	Jael de Pardo	Pan-American Highway
15	Lagos la Vida Loca	Mariana van Zeller	Lagos, Nigeria
16	Destination Anywhere	Tracey Chang	Emigration from Philippines
17	World's Sugar Daddy	Mariana van Zeller	Ethanol in Brazil
18	Pollution to Protest	Laura Ling	Electronic waste
19	World Without Water	Adam Yamaguchi	Droughts in China, Florida, and Lake Mead

=== Season 2 ===
Episode Number	Episode Title	Correspondent	Description
1	America's Secret War with Iran	Mariana van Zeller	Alleged secret war
2	The Great American Detour	Lauren Cerre	American youth
3	Modern Day Pirates	Kaj Larsen	Malacca
4	I Heart Global Warming	Adam Yamaguchi	Greenland
5	Maxed Out	None	Economic crisis
6	Chinatown, Africa	Mariana van Zeller	Chinese in Africa
7	Getting Out of Prison	Laura Ling	Parolees
8	Japan: Robot Nation	Adam Yamaguchi	Loss of employment to robots
9	Fully Automatic America	Kaj Larsen	Guns in the US
10	The Most Controversial Jail in the World	Adrian Baschuk	Guantanamo
11	Hot SexXxy Young	Cerissa Tanner	Underage prostitution
12	Battle of Saipan	Adam Yamaguchi	Economy
13	Narco War Next Door	Laura Ling	Mexican drug gangs
14	Beach of Death	Christof Putzel & Kaj Larsen	Somalia conflict
15	Lost Vegas	Laura Ling	Recession in Las Vegas
16	Outsourcing Unemployment	Adam Yamaguchi	Recession in China
17	Thank You, Recession	Tracey Chang & Lauren Cerre	Argentine Recession

=== Season 3 ===
Episode Number	Episode Title	Correspondent	Description
1	The Oxycontin Express	Mariana van Zeller	Pain killer trade in Florida (won 2009 Peabody Award)
2	Cuba: Waiting for a Revolution	Adrian Baschuk	Communism in Cuba
3	Forest of Ecstasy	Adam Yamaguchi	Cambodian rainforest
4	Sri Lanka: Notes from a War on Terror	Mariana van Zeller	Tamil Tigers
5	Porn 2.0	Christof Putzel	New media and adult entertainment
6	Prison Contraband	Janet Choi	Smuggling contraband into prison
7	Remote Control War	Kaj Larsen	Technology and war
8	Cocaine Mafia	Christof Putzel	Cocaine in southern Italy

=== Season 4 ===
Special - Captive in North Korea (Interview with former Vanguard VP Laura Ling)

Episode Number	Episode Title	Correspondent	Description
1	Missionaries of Hate	Mariana van Zeller	Anti-gay bill in Uganda
2	Rape on the Reservation	Mariana van Zeller	Sexual assaults on Native American reservations
3	The World's Toilet Crisis	Adam Yamaguchi	Open defecation in Southeast Asia
4	Soccer's Lost Boys	Mariana van Zeller	Football trafficking
5	War Crimes	Kaj Larsen	Rise of PTSD among war veterans
6	American Jihadi	Christof Putzel	American-born Somali terrorist Omar Hammami
7	Life and Death on the Border	Christof Putzel	Illegal crossing of the US/Mexico border
8	Marijuana Wars Part 1	Adam Yamaguchi	Mexican drug trafficking organizations growing marijuana in the US
9	Marijuana Wars Part 2	Adam Yamaguchi	Taking down low-level planters and high-level financiers

=== Season 5 ===
Episode Number	Episode Title	Correspondent	Description
1	Gateway to Heroin	Mariana van Zeller	OxyContin and heroin in Boston
2	Sex, Lies, & Cigarettes	Christof Putzel	"Smoking Baby" and Big Tobacco in Indonesia
3	Sushi to the Slaughter	Adam Yamaguchi	The cost of sushi to bluefin tuna
4	City of God, Guns, & Gangs	Mariana van Zeller	Transforming Rio de Janeiro's slums for the 2014 World Cup and 2016 Olympics
5	Tiger Farms	Adam Yamaguchi	Black market tiger trading
6	This (Illegal) American Life	Mariana van Zeller	Personal stories of illegal immigrants living in America
7	Recovery High	None	A New England high school which helps students struggling with addiction
8	Arming the Mexican Cartels	Christof Putzel	The gun-fueled drug war in Juarez, Mexico
9	Islamophobia	Adam Yamaguchi	Islamophobia's rise in the US and the UK
10	Under the Knife Abroad	Adam Yamaguchi	Medical tourism in India, Mexico, and Barbados
11	The War on Weed	Christof Putzel	The enforcement of marijuana laws across the United States
12	Two Americas	None	A month in the lives of two American families at different ends of the economic spectrum
13	The 99 Percent	Christof Putzel	The Occupy Wall Street movement
14	Cage Fighting in the USA	Mariana van Zeller	Mixed Martial Arts' growth as a sport in America

=== Season 6 ===
Episode Number	Episode Title	Correspondent	Description
1	Arming the Mexican Cartels	Christof Putzel	Investigating the trafficking of guns into Mexico from the United States.
2	The 99 Percent	Christof Putzel	Camp out with the crowd of Occupy Wall Street.
3	Showdown in Klan Town	Christof Putzel	Explore the modern-day Klan in the city of Harrison, Arkansas.
4	The Right to Kill: Stand Your Ground USA	Christof Putzel	Go behind the headlines of "Stand Your Ground Laws" in the USA.

== See also ==
- The 90's (1989-1992)
- Fault Lines (2009-2018)
