= America Tonight =

Al Jazeera America news program

- Title card
- Created by: Al Jazeera America / Kim Bondy
- Presented by: Joie Chen
- Country of origin: United States

Production
- Production location: Washington, D.C. (Newseum)
- Running time: 30 minutes (originally 1 hour)

Original release
- Network: Al Jazeera America
- Release: August 2013 – March 2016

America Tonight was Al Jazeera America's flagship news show between August 2013 and March 2016, airing at 9:30 p.m. EST. It was a showcase for thought-provoking and insightful in-depth reporting and programming with a focus on investigative reporting. Its mission is to tell urgent, important and underreported stories with the quality, depth and time they deserve. The newsmagazine program was hosted by former CNN International anchor and former CBS News correspondent Joie Chen, and was produced from Al Jazeera America's Newseum studio in Washington, D.C. It featured correspondents Adam May, Lori Jane Gliha, Sheila MacVicar, Christof Putzel, Michael Okwu, Sarah Hoye, and Lisa Fletcher.

== History ==
Al Jazeera America hired Kim Bondy, a former executive producer with CNN to produce America Tonight from the ground up. The program presents in-depth segments each night on the economy, government, education, healthcare and the environment, and include breaking news stories. The program also features work by the Al Jazeera America investigative unit and covers stories in depth from across America, revealing new insights on the news of the day and breaking stories with its own original reporting. America Tonight also incorporates social media interaction on screen and off to reflect the views of its American audience. On July 1, 2013, longtime CNN anchor Soledad O'Brien was hired to be a special correspondent for America Tonight, as well as a deal with her production company Starfish Media Group to produce long-form documentaries for Al Jazeera America.

The show, originally an hour long at 9pm eastern was shortened to 30 minutes and moved to 10 eastern on February, 2nd, 2015, it was then moved to 9:30pm on November, 2nd, 2015 timed with the HD launch of the channel on DirecTV.

== Focus ==
The show focus was on the average American person and their connection with a particular story. The show also showed investigative work as part of Al Jazeera Investigates. When Al Jazeera America was formed out of the former Current TV what remained of Current's long time investigative program Vanguard most notably Christof Putzel was integrated into the program and Al Jazeera's investigative team.

== Awards ==
In 2014 Al Jazeera America and producer Reed Lindsay won a Gracie Award in the “Outstanding Hard News Feature” category from the Alliance for Women in Media Foundation for the story “Fists of Fury,” which aired on America Tonight. The award was the first award ever for the channel. In 2015 Al Jazeera and producer Jihan Hafiz won a National Association Of Black Journalists Salute to Excellence award in the "Long Form Feature" category for the story "Fists Up Fight Back" about a group of young female black lives matter activists in Washington, D.C.
