= Imran Garda =

South African journalist, presenter and novelist

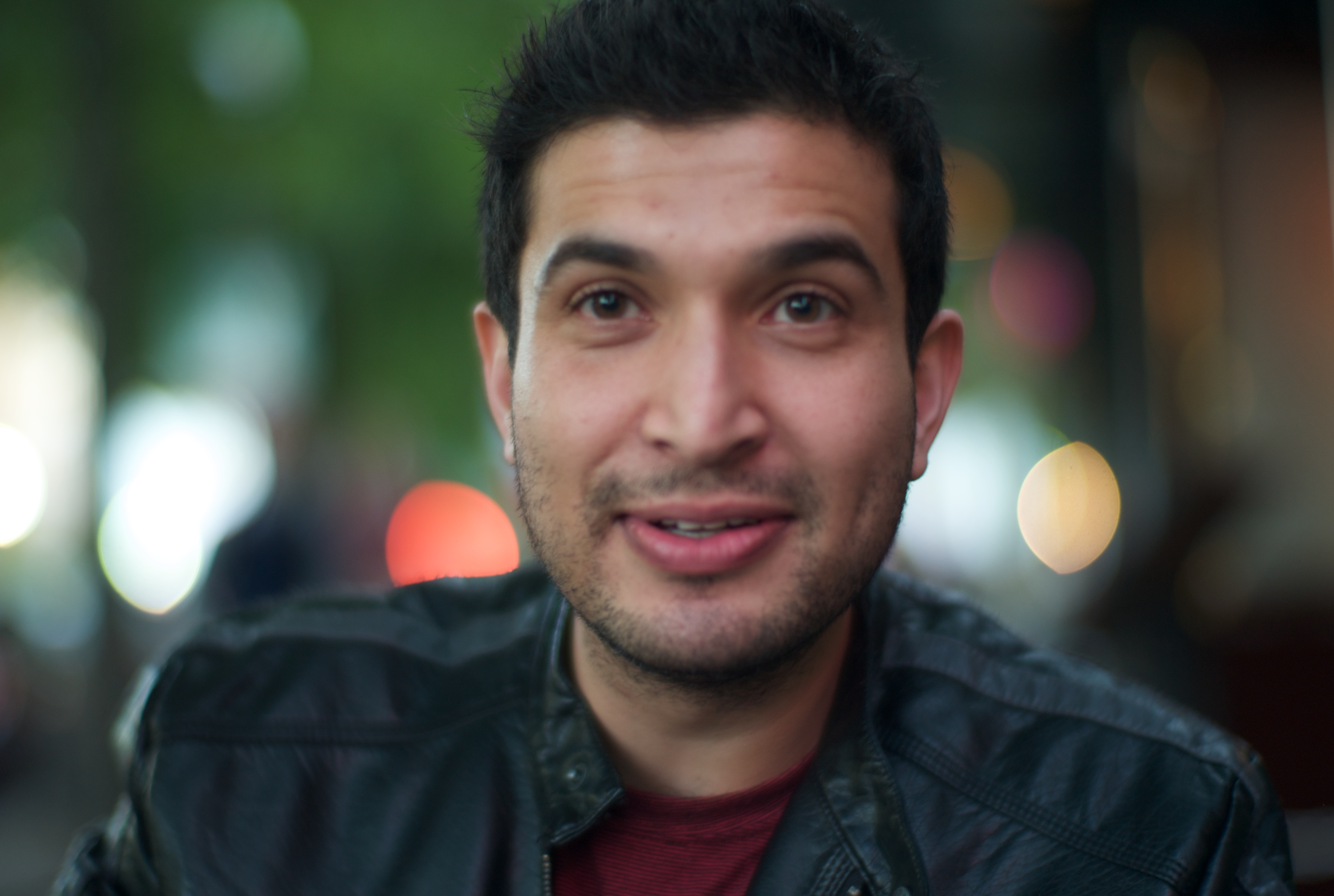
- Born: 7 August 1982 (age 43); Kagiso, Transvaal Province, South Africa
- Occupations: Journalist, author, television presenter
- Years active: More than 20 years
- Notable credit(s): The Stream; Inside Story; Newshour; Al Jazeera America News; AJ+ The Thunder That Roars; The Newsmakers; Third Rail; Crossing the Line
- Title: Presenter of The InnerView on TRT World
- Awards: Olive Schreiner Prize

Imran Garda (born 7 August 1982) is a South African journalist, presenter, and novelist. The long-running host of The Newsmakers from 2015 to 2020, Garda returned to TRT World in 2022 with the one-on-one interview program The InnerView. He was formerly the host of Third Rail on Al Jazeera America based in New York City. Garda was also a senior presenter and producer for AJ+, Al Jazeera Media Network's all digital video news channel based in San Francisco. Previously, he worked for Al Jazeera English in Doha, Qatar and Washington, DC. He also hosted the show The Stream.

== Early career ==
Garda's media career began as a sports presenter and reporter for SuperSport in South Africa in 2002. He covered mostly cricket and football. While at Supersport he was published as a freelance writer on politics—which included a series on Bosnia-Herzegovina ten years after the Yugoslav Wars ended.

=== First stint ===
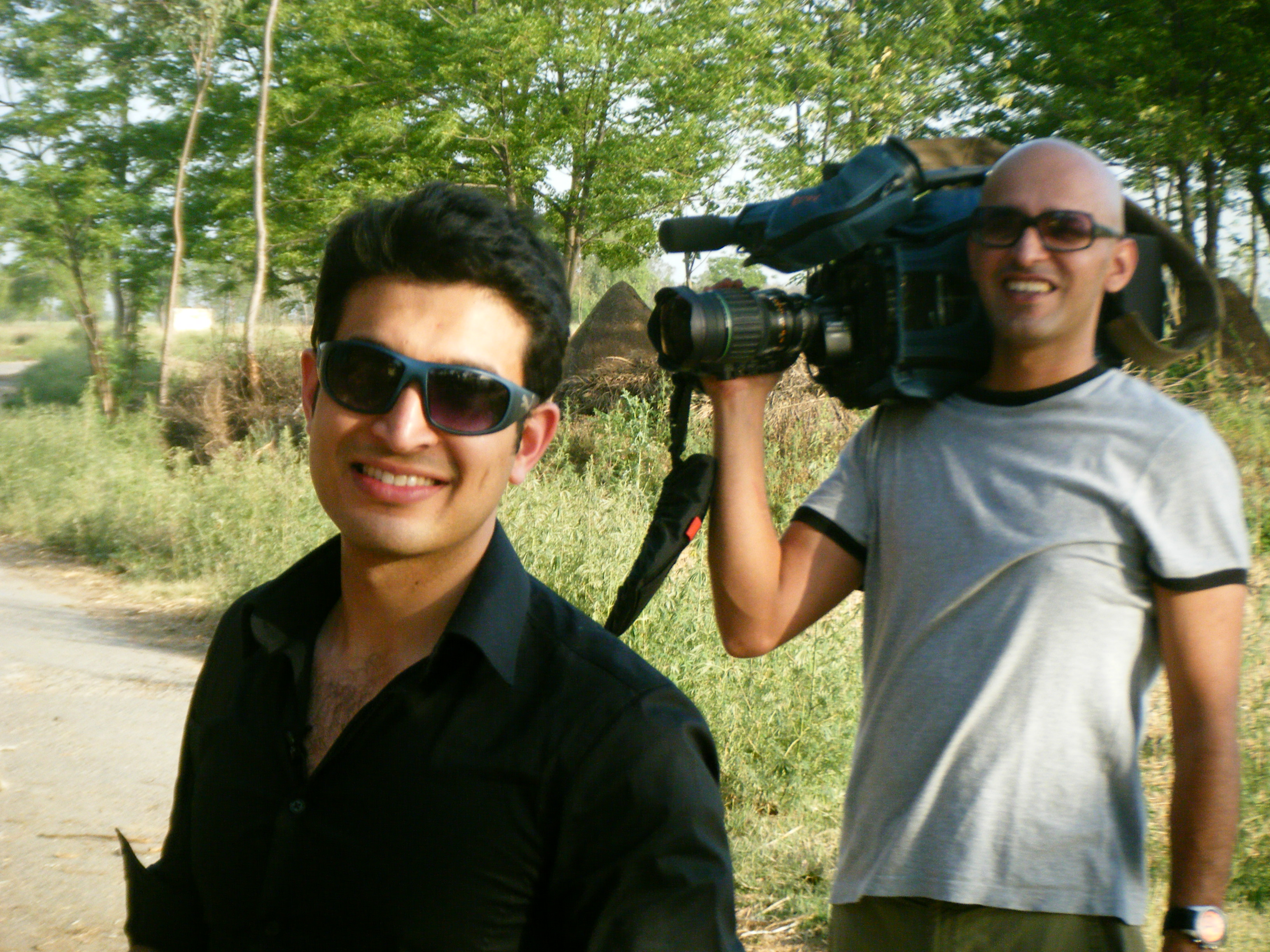
Imran Garda filming with Al Jazeera English in 2009

Garda joined Al Jazeera English in 2006 initially as a sports presenter, but was moved to news during the piloting phase. He anchored the news and Inside Story from Doha, Kuala Lumpur and Washington DC. He also hosted the award-winning (RTS) The Stream until he left the network in 2012. He reported from the US, Sudan, Turkey, Egypt, Namibia, Bahrain, Lesotho, India, South Africa and the Hajj in Saudi Arabia. Garda hosted a 13-part series on the aftermath of the War in Gaza - Focus on Gaza and presented the long-form documentaries The Father of the Turks, A Voyage of Life and Death and India's Silent War. He also contributed feature articles and blog posts to Aljazeera.com and The Huffington Post. On 7 June 2012, Al Jazeera English announced that Garda would be returning to South Africa.

=== Second stint ===
In 2013, Garda returned to the network for the network's digital channel AJ+ based in San Francisco, California where he specialized in short documentaries, including a special on Black Lives Matter protesters in Ferguson, Missouri. Beginning in 2015, Garda also anchored the news at Al Jazeera America in New York City. On 16 April 2015 it was announced that Garda would host a show on Al Jazeera America called Third Rail, an hour-long, guest-driven debate program focused on under-reported stories and hot-button topics.

== TRT World ==
In October 2015, Garda joined TRT World, Turkish Radio and Television Corporation's English-language channel as host of The Newsmakers, an interview and debate program with "in-depth reports and strong, unfiltered debates - examining the people and the stories that are shaping our lives."

In April 2016 Garda and his colleague Jerome Evans were given rare access to make a documentary in North Korea during the Pyongyang Marathon. Garda documented the challenges of doing journalism in the country.

In their documentary The Invisible Empire: the KKK and Hate in America, Garda and Evans got up close with the Ku Klux Klan in a show that highlighted the resurgence of white supremacism in the United States.

The Newsmakers also did a special show from London on the occasion of the historic Brexit referendum.

Imran's final episode on the program aired in July 2020. During his time hosting The Newsmakers he also hosted the documentary series "Crossing the Line," featuring guests such as Imran Khan, Yanis Varoufakis, Julius Malema and Juan Manuel Santos.

In 2022, Garda launched The InnerView, a one-on-one interview program for which he also serves as executive producer. The show features half-hour in-depth interviews with some of the world's most fascinating people, including prominent historians such as British historian Bettany Hughes, actors such as Adrian Grenier, politicians such as Ehud Olmert, John Bolton, Kersti Kaljulaid and Miguna Miguna, as well as figures from sport, music and the arts.

The InnerView show logo. The InnerView airs on TRT World. Source: TRT World

== Novel: The Thunder That Roars ==
In June 2014 Umuzi, an imprint of Penguin Random House published Garda's debut novel The Thunder That Roars. The book was awarded the 2015 Olive Schreiner Prize for prose and optioned for a feature film. A tale of a journalist who embarks on a journey to find a missing family friend and uncovers long-held family secrets and undergoes an inward journey of his own, the book was described by adjudicators as, "South African literature [that] soars above the tortuous apartheid history and redefines globalisation." Reviewer Eric Garland called it, "[A] breathtakingly strong debut novel about the self-discovery and strained relationships of human beings in an era that defies understanding." It was also long-listed for The Etisalat Prize for Literature. Garda is represented by The Lennon-Ritchie Agency.

== Interviews ==
Garda has interviewed many influential people throughout his career. They include former President of Afghanistan Hamid Karzai, President of East Timor José Ramos-Horta, former Israeli Prime Minister Ehud Olmert, former UK Prime Ministers Tony Blair and Gordon Brown, former Ukrainian President Petro Poroshenko, former President of Estonia Kersti Kaljulaid, South African politician and President of the Economic Freedom Fighters Julius Malema, former President of Georgia and Governor of Odesa Oblast Mikheil Saakashvili, ICC Chief prosecutor Luis Moreno-Ocampo, former Prime Minister of Pakistan Imran Khan, British historians Bettany Hughes and Antony Beevor, football star Frédéric Kanouté, Jordan's Prince El Hassan bin Talal, British singer Yusuf / Cat Stevens, UNAIDS Executive Director Winnie Byanyima and former Turkish Prime Minister Ahmet Davutoglu.

Garda has also had the opportunity to interview non-state actors from the likes of Hamas, Somali rebel groups, Chechen rebels, Uganda's LRA, and other designated terror groups. He has chaired panels for the World Humanitarian Summit, United Nations Human Rights Council, UN Migration (IOM), TRT World Forum, Antalya Diplomacy Forum and Advertising Week.
