= Viqueira =

Viqueira is a surname. Notable people with the surname include:

- Emilio Viqueira (born 1974), Spanish footballer
- Mike Viqueira (born 1960), American broadcast journalist

== See also ==
- Siqueira
