= Adam May =

Adam May may refer to:

- Adam May (television reporter), American reporter
- Adam May (footballer) (born 1997), British footballer
- Adam May (sailor) (born 1976), British Olympic sailor
