= Tony Harris (journalist) =

American news anchor, journalist (born 1959)

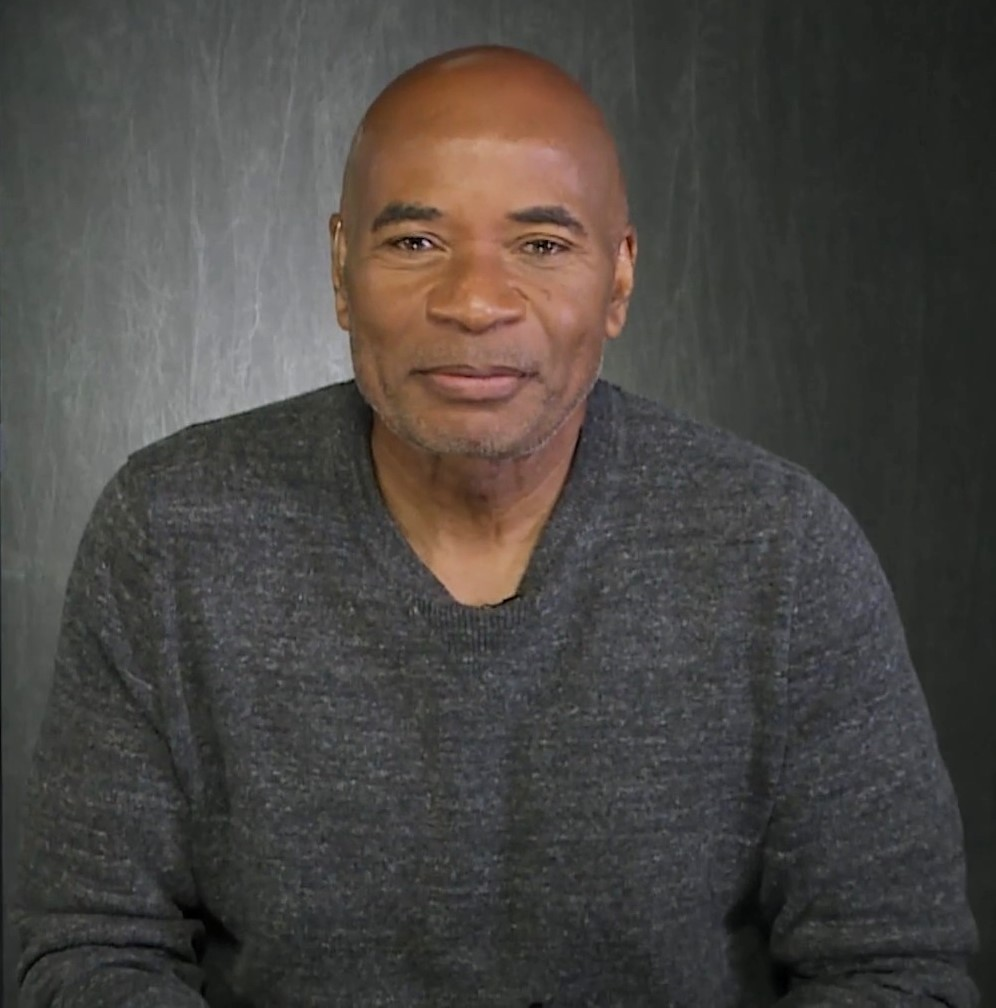
- Harris in 2022
- Born: July 25, 1967 (age 59); Baltimore, Maryland, U.S.
- Education: University of Maryland, Baltimore County, (B.A.)
- Occupations: Journalist, anchorman
- Notable credit(s): Al Jazeera America News; Al Jazeera English Newshour; CNN Saturday Morning; CNN Sunday Morning; CNN Newsroom

Tony Harris (born July 25, 1967) is an American journalist, news anchor, and television producer. He was notable for his time as an anchor on Al Jazeera English, Al Jazeera America, and CNN.

== Early life and education ==
Harris is a native of Baltimore, Maryland and graduated from Franklin High School in nearby Reisterstown in 1985. He went on to earn a BA degree from the University of Maryland, Baltimore County.

== Career ==
=== Radio ===
Harris began his career in broadcasting as radio disc jockey in his native Baltimore, Maryland on WSID-AM after dropping out of Towson State University. He later worked for sister stations WLPL in Baltimore and WOOK in Washington, DC. He continued in radio moving to WJMO in Cleveland, where he was host of a morning talk show at age 21.

=== Local television ===
Two years later, in 1983, Harris was hired by WJW-TV, then the CBS affiliate in Cleveland, as a reporter for its "PM Magazine" show. He spent 10 years at WJW as co-host of the magazine and as a general assignment news reporter before leaving to join "Entertainment Tonight" where he worked until 1990.

Harris was a weekend news anchor in Cleveland, Ohio at WKYC (Channel 3) from 1990 to 1993. During that time he won a local Emmy Award.

In 1993, Harris left Cleveland to join the original reporting team behind the Fox Network's prime time newsmagazine Front Page.

He returned to local news in 1996 as lead anchor for WBFF's "News at 10" in Baltimore. and then for WGCL-TV in Atlanta, Georgia, before joining CNN in September 2004.

=== CNN ===
Based at CNN Center in Atlanta, Harris co-anchored CNN Saturday Morning and CNN Sunday Morning with Betty Nguyen until he made the move to anchor CNN Newsroom on September 8, 2008. He was also a frequent substitute anchor on weekday news programs including American Morning. While at CNN, Harris was a member of the teams that earned George Foster Peabody Awards for coverage of the British Petroleum oil spill and Hurricane Katrina, and an Alfred I. duPont Award for coverage of the Southeast Asia tsunami.

Harris left CNN at the end of December 2010.

=== Al Jazeera ===
In April 2011, he debuted as an anchor on Al Jazeera English. His first broadcast was at 16:00 GMT on April 12, 2011. His first broadcast was the first regularly scheduled program ever on the network with the news at 4:00 p.m. Eastern Time.

=== Special projects ===
Harris began working with the Investigation Discovery Channel in 2015 for a project with the Southern Poverty Law Center. The first project was a special report called "Hate in America." The program, which aired on May 21, 2016, focused on an effort by anti-government groups and white supremacists to turn Montana's Flathead Valley, near Glacier National Park, into a whites-only refuge.

Harris joined the Discovery Channel in 2017 as a host of a six-part "Investigation Discovery" series titled Scene of the Crime with Tony Harris. The format of the program featured Harris exploring how small towns in America dealt with instances of crime and violence.

In 2020, Harris began hosting the podcast Monster: DC Sniper.

In January 2021, he began hosting a program called "The Proof is Out There" which aired Tuesdays at 10:00 p.m. Eastern Time on the History Channel. The series profiles unexplained news stories from around the world, such as UFOs and unidentified creatures.

== Personal life ==
Harris and his wife, Amanda, have one son, Michael, born in 1995.
