= Ehab Al Shihabi =

- Born: 1970 (age 55–56); Amman, Jordan
- Citizenship: United States, Jordan
- Education: University of Jordan (BA); University of Jordan (MBA); Georgetown University (MSc)

Ehab Al Shihabi (born 1970) is a Jordanian-American media professional, advisor to the Director General at Al Jazeera Media Network. He was the network's former executive director of international operations, chief executive officer of Al Jazeera America, and deputy managing director of Al Jazeera English. Shihabi is an Edward R. Murrow Center Senior Fellow at The Fletcher School of Law and Diplomacy, and writes opinion pieces for The Huffington Post, Inc. Magazine, and other outlets.

== Early life and education ==
Shihabi was born in Amman, Jordan in 1970. He is both an American and Jordanian citizen. He earned his BSc in Management from the University of Jordan in 1993. He then went on to earn his MBA from the University of Jordan in 1996 before earning his MSc in Leadership and Strategy from Georgetown University in 2006.

== Career ==
Ehab Al Shihabi started his career as a management consultant at Andersen Consulting in 1997. He later worked for KPGM and Deloitte.

Shihabi was hired by Al Jazeera Media Network in 2009 to be the Deputy Managing Director at Al Jazeera English. In 2011 he was named the Executive Director of international operations Al Jazeera Media Network. He was one of the principal people involved in the process of buying Current TV for $500 million and setting up Al Jazeera America (reaching 60 million homes), as well as Al Jazeera Türk and Al Jazeera Balkans. Shihabi stated in regards to the launch of Al Jazeera America: "It's going to be run by American talent and staff for the American audience", adding there would be "less opinion, less yelling and fewer celebrity sightings". He defined the channel as providing "accurate, in-depth, unbiased news stories". Bob Meyers, president of the National Press Foundation, titled that Jazeera's launch as "transformative".

Shihabi had been largely involved in the business aspects of Al Jazeera America such as the budget for the channel and helping in securing carriage agreements with television carriers and making the channel available on different platforms such as carrier TV Everywhere platforms, in other words continuing its branding and awareness campaigns, while expanding its cable distribution and online presence. Since January 2013, 900 people were hired for the new venture, a great part from other networks such as CNN and ABC, including John Seigenthaler and Kate O'Brian.

During his tenure, Al Jazeera America's ratings grew for three continuous quarters, and topped at three million unique viewers in the first two weeks of July 2014. The medium also became available to 60 million households under Al Shihabi, which is below the 100 million mark other cable broadcasters count with. The broadcaster amassed a number of journalism awards as well, including two Peabody Awards. This, however, was not enough according to some, describing its 30 thousand daily viewers as too low, or even "minuscule", and stating its online presence as deficient, even though some praised its content's quality.

Having been termed "the most ambitious American TV news launch since Fox News" during its launch, in April 2016 Al Jazeera America ceased operations in the US. Among the reasons for the network's demise, certain factors are often cited: the network was not carried on many cable providers; management problems; the drop in oil prices and subsequent "economic challenges"; aversion to the Al Jazeera name; and its poor use of the online market.

Shihabi served as CEO since July 2013 until May 2015.

Since leaving, Shihabi writes opinion pieces for The Huffington Post and other outlets, and keeps his position as advisor to the Director General at Al Jazeera Media Network. He also is an Edward R. Murrow Center Senior Fellow at The Fletcher School of Law and Diplomacy.

=== Controversy ===
In May 2015, Mostefa Souag announced Shihabi was to be replaced by Al Anstey, following revelations of a lawsuit against the network by a former employee. The broadcaster also faced a $15 million discrimination lawsuit. After shutting down in April 2016, former executive vice president of finance filed a racial discrimination suit against the network, alleging "Al Anstey had reneged on a promise" made by Ehab Al Shihabi for a promotion and salary raise.

== Personal life ==
He has a wife and two children, and lives in Washington D.C.

== Publications ==
- How to Develop an Information Advantage in the Age of Content Shock, Inc. Magazine, 2016.
- Who Stands for Islam? Let’s Stamp out ‘Gangster Islam’, The Huffington Post, 2016.
- The Age of Nano News and Why We Must Pay, The Huffington Post, 2016.
- A Call to Action: Curing Islam’s American Crisis, The Huffington Post, 2016.
