= Andrea Stone =

American journalist

Andrea Stone is a retired American journalist. She is best known as a long-time correspondent for USA Today.

== Early life and education ==
Born in the Bronx, New York City, she graduated from the Columbia University Graduate School of Journalism.

== Career ==
Stone started her career working for newspapers in Illinois, Florida, and New York, including the Riverdale Press, and freelanced for Newsweek, Business Week, Chicago Tribune, The Gainesville Sun. She also worked with Gannett News Service in Arlington, Virginia. Later she served as Washington bureau chief for AOL News.

In 1985 she was hired by USA Today and worked there for nearly 25 years. In 2001, The Register criticized her piece on cyber-war as reading like government propaganda. However, Stone was proved prescient years later when the threat of cyberattacks became clearly documented <ref</https://www.theguardian.com/technology/2026/aug/04/us-cyber-attacks-water-minnesota-iran </ref>. In 2002, she was told by the Huffington Post to delete a Facebook post asking if Nazis felt "more comfortable" with the GOP than other parties, which was covered in Forbes. Other articles she wrote for USA Today, covered topics like 9/11 at the Pentagon. as well as national and international news, Congress and politics.

In 2011, she was hired by Huffington Post Media as Senior National Correspondent in politics, and that year was mentioned at the National Press Club by Arianna Huffington and Tim Armstrong.

In April 2013, she was hired as a senior executive producer for digital for Al Jazeera America.

By 2015, she had worked as a freelancer for National Geographic and other publications. She also taught as an adjunct professor at American University in Washington, D.C. Also in 2015, she became director of career services for the CUNY Graduate School of Journalism. She retired in June 2019.

Stone has appeared on CNN and C-SPAN. She co-authored "Desert Warriors: Men and Women Who Won the Persian Gulf War."
