= Zeina Awad =

Lebanese news correspondent

Zeina Awad (Arabic: زينة عوض) is a Lebanese/Canadian news correspondent who used to co-host Fault Lines, Al Jazeera English's flagship current affairs programme about the Americas. Awad says she believes that Fault Lines strives to identify and patch information gaps by "asking the tough questions" of the countries and people in power.

Before joining Al Jazeera English, Awad was a producer for the BBC's HARDtalk and Panorama programmes (2004–2006), CNN, and the Canadian Broadcasting Corporation (2000–2002). Later on, she left Al Jazeera in 2013, then joined TRT World from 2015 to 2017.

After 15 years in journalism, Awad joined the international civil service and humanitarian fields as a senior strategic communications specialist and advisor for UNICEF, UNESCO and MSF, with a focus on climate justice and gender equality.

== Beginnings ==
She has a BA in political science and women's studies from McGill University and a master's degree in comparative politics from the London School of Economics.

== Career ==
=== Fault Lines ===
Awad's Fault Lines coverage brought her to India where she reported on US pharmaceutical companies conducting clinical research abroad. She also covered the 2012 US election and the so-called war on drugs in Central America.

Awad says she believes that Fault Lines strives to identify and patch information gaps by "asking the tough questions" of the countries and people in power.

=== Other coverages ===
Awad has covered some of the Middle East and Africa's most important stories, including the refugee crisis in Europe, the fight to defeat ISIL in Iraq and Libya, elections in the US, Africa and Europe, and conflict in Syria, Sudan, Lebanon, the DRC, and Somalia.
