= Morgan Radford =

American television journalist

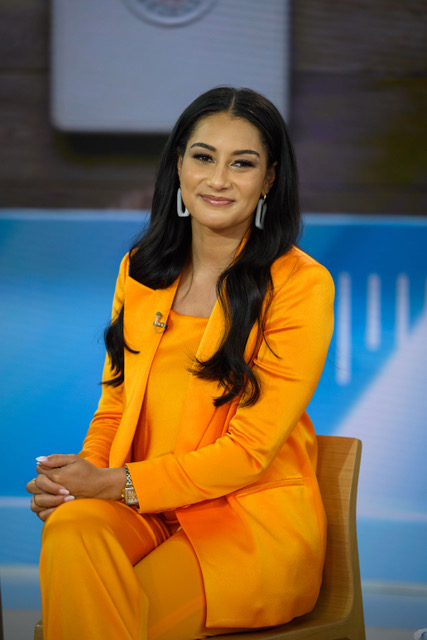
- Born: Morgan Kelly Radford; November 18, 1987 (age 38); Greensboro, North Carolina, U.S.
- Education: Grimsley High School; Harvard University (BA); Columbia University (MA)
- Occupations: Journalist; broadcaster
- Years active: 2012-present
- Employer: NBC News
- Spouse: David Williams (m. 2022)
- Children: 2
- Website: https://morganradford.com

Morgan Kelly Radford (born November 18, 1987) is an American television news anchor and reporter employed by NBC News as a New York–based correspondent.

== Early life and education ==
Radford is originally from Greensboro, North Carolina. Her mother, Dr. Lily Kelly-Radford, is a former clinical psychologist and current management consultant. Radford graduated from Grimsley High School. In May 2009, she graduated from Harvard University with honors earning a bachelor's degree in Social Studies and Foreign Language Citations in French and Spanish. Later in 2009, she was an intern at CNN for Morning Express with Robin Meade. Radford received a Fulbright Scholarship in 2010 where she taught English in Durban, Kwa-Zulu Natal, South Africa. During the 2010 World Cup, she was a production assistant for ESPN.

From 2011 to 2012, Radford attended Columbia University, completing a master's degree in broadcast journalism and was named a Joseph Pulitzer II and Edith Pulitzer Moore Fellow.

== Career ==
=== Early career ===
She joined ABC News as a fellow in 2012, where she eventually anchored for ABC News Now. She moved to Al Jazeera America in 2013 as an anchor/correspondent, where she anchored the former weekend morning newscast.

=== NBC News ===
In September 2015, Radford joined NBC News and MSNBC as a correspondent. In April 2021, she was given her own show on NBC News alongside Aaron Gilchrist for NBC News' live-streaming outlet, NBC News Now.

In September 2022, Radford became co-anchor of NBC News Daily in addition to being an NBC News Now anchor and an NBC News correspondent.

=== Author ===
In 2026 she published her debut novel, Now Then.

== Personal life ==
Radford was originally scheduled to marry her fiancé David Williams in May 2020, but their wedding was postponed due to the COVID-19 pandemic. In January 2022, Radford married Williams in Cartagena, Colombia.

In 2018, Radford publicly discussed freezing her eggs for maintaining fertility options. In August 2022, Radford announced that she was pregnant with her first child. She gave birth to a daughter on February 2, 2023. She gave birth to another daughter in May 2026.
