= Newshour (2006 TV programme) =

- Title card
- Genre: News program
- Presented by: Various
- Country of origin: Qatar
- Original language: English

Production
- Production locations: Al Jazeera Broadcast Centre, Doha, Qatar
- Running time: 60 minutes

Original release
- Network: Al Jazeera English
- Release: November 15, 2006

Newshour is the name of Al Jazeera English's daily hour-long news bulletins that have been aired since 15 November 2006. With nine editions per day (at 700, 1000, 1300, 1500, 1600, 1800, 1900, 2100 and 2200 GMT), Newshour is a comprehensive round-up of the latest in global news and sport. Since July 2023, all editions of the Newshour have been broadcast solely from Al Jazeera's headquarters in Doha. Newshour was also shown live on Al Jazeera America during its existence in the morning, midday hours, at 1800 ET and would be cut in if a major world news story breaks. In 2006, Newshour was the first English language news program to be broadcast from the Middle East.

== Notable presenters ==
=== News ===
- Dareen Abughaida
- Folly Bah Thibault
- Neave Barker
- Nick Clark
- Adrian Finighan
- Cary Johnston
- Darren Jordon
- Laura Kyle
- Rob Matheson
- Tom McRae
- Elizabeth Puranam
- Sohail Rahman
- Maleen Saeed
- Nastasya Tay
- Cyril Vanier
- Sami Zeidan
- Sara Khairat
- Anna Burns-Francis

=== Sport ===
- Farrah Esmail
- Joanna Gasiorowska
- Sana Hamouche
- Gemma Nash
- Andy Richardson
- Peter Stemmet

=== Weather ===
- Everton Fox
- Jeff Harrington
- Cara Legg
- Rob McElwee

== See also ==
- AJAM Newshour - Al Jazeera America spin-off of Newshour.
