= Elizabeth Puranam =

Television anchor and journalist

- Born: Hyderabad, India
- Occupation: Journalist
- Years active: 2008–present
- Employer: Al Jazeera
- Spouse: Alexandre Bernard (m. 2021)

Elizabeth Puranam is an Indian-born New Zealand journalist, best known for her work as a reporter and presenter for Al Jazeera.

== Biography ==
Puranam was born at the Mahatma Gandhi Hospital in Hyderabad, India. She moved to Auckland with her family when she was 10, first settling in Avondale, then Glen Eden, and finally Piha (West Auckland). Whilst living in Auckland, Puranam earned a BA in political science and media.

Puranam started her career at Television New Zealand and the news desk at TV3. She can read and write in Arabic and can speak Hindi and Telugu.

== Personal life ==
Puranam married French sports agent Alexandre Bernard who she met in Doha. Puranam lives with her family in south Delhi.
