= Jonathan Betz =

American journalist and television anchor

Jonathan Edward Betz
- Born: Dallas, Texas
- Education: Syracuse University
- Occupations: Journalist, Anchorman
- Notable credit: News
- Awards: 2 Emmys, Edward R. Murrow

Jonathan Betz is an American journalist and anchorman for China Global Television Network. He began his television career at WWL-TV in New Orleans, Louisiana, where he rode out Hurricane Katrina from inside the city. For weeks, he remained in New Orleans and was one of the few local reporters to extensively cover the storm. He later moved on to WFAA-TV in Dallas, Texas, where he was a reporter and fill in anchor. Betz was brought on at Al Jazeera America at the launch of the network. Betz is the weekend evening news anchor for the channel and a weekday fill in anchor. He also does reporting in the field. Since 2017, Betz moved on to CGTN in Beijing, hosting the evening (GMT+8) news programs including The World Today and The Link.

== Biography ==
On July 11, 2013 The Huffington Post reported that Betz was among the first anchors hired by Al Jazeera America. Prior to joining Al Jazeera America, the Richardson High School graduate spent five years reporting in his hometown at WFAA-TV, where he covered the West plant explosion, the Ft Hood Shooting and the Joplin tornado. He's the recipient of two regional Emmy awards for overall excellence and for his coverage of devastating wildfires in 2011.

In 2012, Betz returned to New Orleans to cover Hurricane Isaac. He was one of the first reporters in the flood zone - arriving before the National Guard in Plaquemines Parish. Betz was also acknowledged for his live tweeting during the storm. His dispatches were among the first from the impacted areas, showing the scale of devastation and the rescues. Many of his images were picked up by media outlets all over the world.

== Awards ==
While in New Orleans he won an Alfred I. duPont Award and a George Foster Peabody Award with the rest of the team for their coverage of Hurricane Katrina. He was the only reporter in the country to deliver live reports from the lower 9th ward during the hurricane.
