= John Seigenthaler (anchorman) =

American anchorman (born 1955)

- Born: December 21, 1955 (age 70)
- Education: Duke University B.S. in public policy
- Occupations: Journalist, news anchor
- Employer: Al Jazeera America
- Known for: KOMO-TV, NBC News and MSNBC anchor
- Spouse: Kerry Brock (m. 1992)
- Children: 1
- Parent(s): John Seigenthaler and Dolores Watson-Seigenthaler

John Michael Seigenthaler (/ˈsiːɡənθɔːlər/ SEE-gən-thaw-lər; born December 21, 1955) is an American news anchor and a member of the George Foster Peabody Awards board of jurors. He is a former weekend anchor and correspondent for both NBC and MSNBC. He is the son of the late newspaper journalist John Lawrence Seigenthaler, and named for his father. He is best known for his eight-year tenure as weekend anchor of NBC Nightly News. In July 2008, Seigenthaler joined his family company Seigenthaler Public Relations, but continued to be based in New York. From 2013–2016 he worked for the later defunct Al Jazeera America as its evening news anchor.

== Life and career ==
Seigenthaler is a graduate of Father Ryan High School and Duke University, where he received a bachelor of science degree in public policy in 1978.

Seigenthaler began his television news career in 1980 as a writer and producer at WNGE-TV (now WKRN-TV) in Nashville, Tennessee. From 1981 to 1990, he reported and produced for WSMV-TV, Nashville and also hosted a weekday public affairs show. From there he moved to KOMO-TV in Seattle, Washington, where he anchored the weekend evening news.

In January 1992, he married KOMO weeknight anchor Kerry Brock, who later joined him at the weekend anchor desk at KOMO. Then he moved back to Nashville, where he co-anchored the evening news for WKRN-TV.

In September 1999, he became interim co-host on Weekend Today with Soledad O'Brien. He returned in 2003, following the death of David Bloom.

In 1996, he was one of the rotating Sunday anchors, and became the main Sunday anchor in 1998. Seigenthaler served as the anchor for the weekend edition of NBC Nightly News for more than seven years of his 11-year tenure with NBC News. Seigenthaler announced during his April 1, 2007, newscast that it was his final broadcast as anchor of the weekend edition of NBC Nightly News. He also hosted the television shows Lockup and MSNBC Investigates on MSNBC. NBC News President Steve Capus said Seigenthaler's contract was not renewed because the network could no longer afford the luxury of employing a staff member whose primary duty was anchoring the weekend evening news programs. The network announced in October 2006 that job cuts and consolidation of operations would slice some $750 million from parent NBC Universal's budget by 2008.

After NBC, he worked for the Associated Press until joining Seigenthaler Public Relations in July 2008. In 2013 he began work for Al Jazeera America as the anchorman for its one-hour prime time news broadcasts at 8 pm Eastern and 11 pm Eastern time.

Seigenthaler lives in Weston, Connecticut, with his wife and son.

== Journalism awards ==
- Two-time Emmy Award recipient
- Recipient of the Robert F. Kennedy Television News award
- Recipient of the National Headliner Award
- Recipient of the American Bar Association Award
- Iris Award winner
- Recipient of the Al Neuharth Award

== Bibliography ==
- Seigenthaler, John M. (1997). Nashville: City of Note (Urban Tapestry Series). Memphis, TN: Towery Pub. ISBN 1-881096-43-2.
