= Lisa Fletcher =

American television journalist

- Education: University of Oregon (BS)
- Occupation: Television journalist

Lisa Fletcher is an American television journalist. She is an investigative reporter and news anchor who has covered stories around the world - both for ABC News as a correspondent and various major-market television stations. She was previously the host of The Stream on Al Jazeera America based in Washington DC. She is currently with WJLA-TV in Washington, which is owned by Sinclair Broadcast Group.

== Education and early career ==
Fletcher received a Bachelor of Science degree from the University of Oregon in 1990. She majored in Journalism with a minor in English.

In 1990, Fletcher began her on-air career while still in college with KEZI-TV in Eugene, Oregon. After graduating, she accepted a job anchoring daily newscasts for KTVZ-TV in Bend, Oregon. In 1993, she returned to Eugene and KEZI where she was the main anchor and investigative reporter. She covered natural disasters, including some of the Northwest's most devastating floods and forest fires. She also anchored coverage of one of the nation's worst high school shootings, the May 1998 tragedy at Thurston High School in Springfield, Oregon, adjacent to Eugene. The coverage she anchored of the Thurston High shootings was honored with an Edward R. Murrow Award for broadcast excellence.

== TV career ==
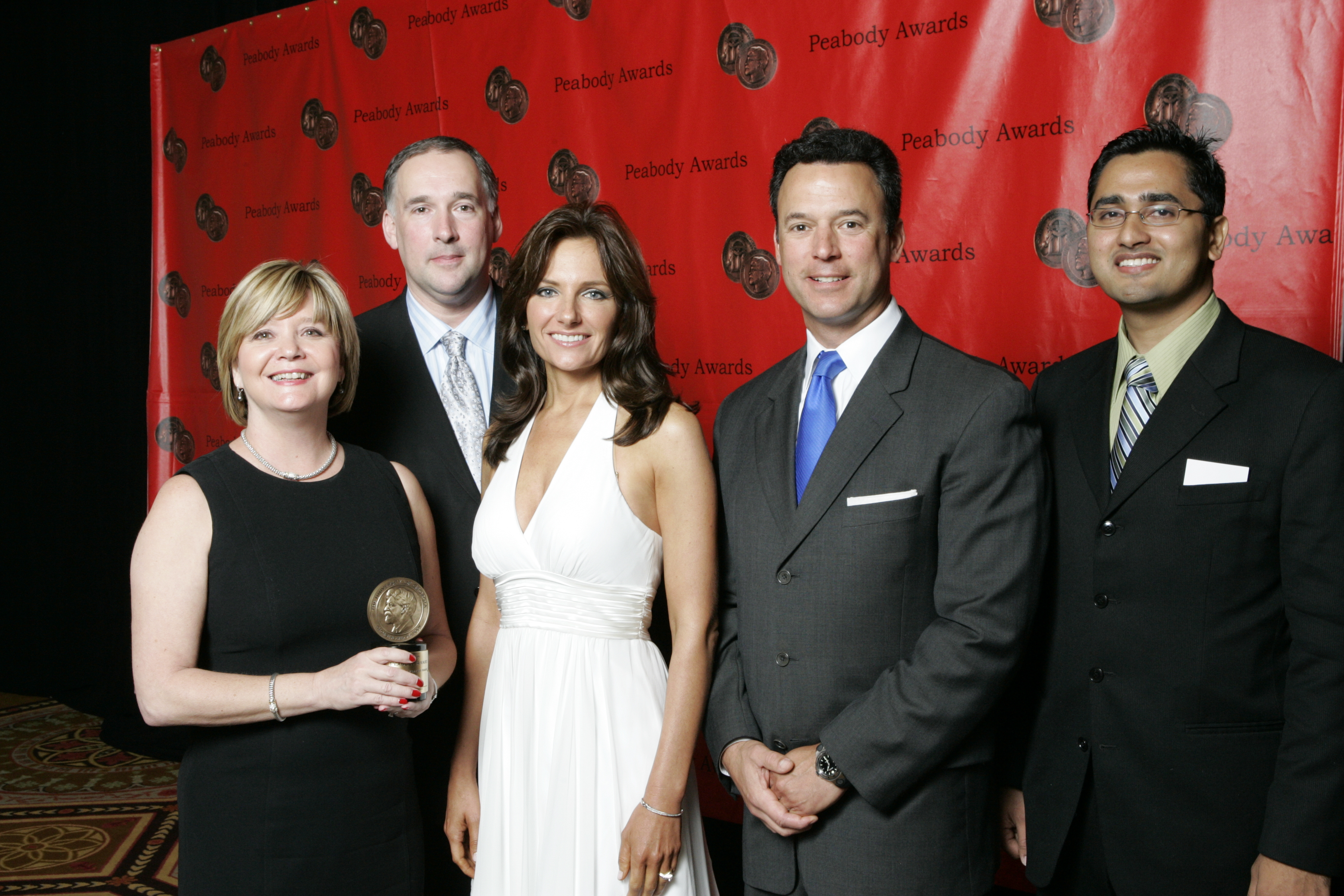
Susan D'Astoli, Joe Hengemuehler, Lisa Fletcher, Jonathan Elias and Vivek Narayan at the 67th Annual Peabody Awards for the story Security Risks at Sky Harbor

In 2002, after winning an Edward R. Murrow Award for an investigative series that exposed corrupt practices among Portland immigration officials, Fletcher accepted the job as the lead investigative reporter and news anchor for KNXV-TV in Phoenix, Arizona. She also co-hosted a Sunday morning political talk show with veteran news man Cary Pfeffer. Her undercover reports closed down corrupt multimillion-dollar businesses, put child predators behind bars and forced state agencies to account for millions of dollars of taxpayer money. Undercover, she also exposed serious security breaches at one of the nation's largest airports. As a result, the TSA immediately suspended, and later replaced, its Federal Security Director. The TSA took over all security checkpoints around the clock and launched a national inquiry into every airport's security procedures. Fletcher's stories also exposed lead in poker chips that are used in the world's most popular casinos. This story prompted international attention and a government investigation.

Fletcher won the prestigious Nancy Dickerson Whitehead Medallion and a $10,000 award for her stories that exposed children abusing over-the-counter medications, resulting in their tragic deaths. Fletcher and her producer donated their $10,000 in prize money to a Phoenix area agency whose mission is to help kids stay off drugs.

In 2007, she began working as an ABC News correspondent in Los Angeles. Then ABC News President David Westin said Fletcher had "a distinguished resume of hard-hitting investigative reports that have led to reforms in government and business. She's an incisive reporter and a skilled storyteller..." . ABC News consistently featured Fletcher on Good Morning America, ABC World News and Nightline.

While reporting for ABC News, Fletcher was assigned to stories including the in-depth examination of Sarah Palin's record and standing during the 2008 presidential campaign, the Governor Mark Sanford political scandal in Argentina, the Craigslist Killer in Boston, the OJ Simpson trial and sentencing in Las Vegas and exclusive, daily coverage of the Michael Jackson death investigation. Fletcher was the first to secure an interview with the high-profile Scientology defector Jenna Miscavige Hill, as part of a full half-hour investigation for Nightline and exposed abuses at the nation's largest chimpanzee experimentation facility – prompting a federal investigation.

Fletcher has won many honors for her work including the prestigious George Foster Peabody Award, multiple Edward R. Murrow Award and numerous Emmy Awards for investigative journalism. She's been featured in magazines, newspapers and a PBS documentary on her work as an investigative journalist.

On April 12, 2016, she was hired by WJLA as senior investigative reporter and to contributing to Full Measure.

== David Dao Coverage ==
On April 11, 2017, Fletcher was assigned a story on the past legal issues of Dr. David Dao, who was forcibly removed from a United Airlines flight on April 9, 2017. A Tweet later appeared on her account that showed many legal documents on Fletcher's desk at WJLA. The strong interest in the incident led editors across the country to assign stories on Dr. Dao. The Tweet that initially appeared on the account was later deleted and replaced with three messages from WJLA:

Hey Twitter, I know my tweet didn't sit well. I can understand how it looks one-sided. I can assure you, it's not. By covering this side of the story, we're [Fletcher and WJLA] not defending United in any way. We'll continue to address their role in this situation. Having said that, violent threats against me - simply for giving all angles of the story - are not okay.

Fletcher indicated she would have a report on WJLA's news program, but WJLA opted not to run the story. WJLA news director Mitch Jacobs noted that there were unanswered questions that contributed to the decision to kill the story, including Dao's behavior before videos of the incident started and the apology of the United CEO. The police report filed regarding the incident says that David Dao "fought with officers before he was pulled from the plane."

== Personal ==
Lisa Fletcher married Wayne Pacelle, the former president and CEO of the Humane Society of the United States, in May 2013.
