= AJ+ =

Online news service

- Available in: English, Arabic, Spanish, French
- Predecessors: Current TV (English), (Spanish) (originally occupied former building and studio)
- Headquarters: AJ+ English Washington D.C. AJ+ Arabi, AJ+ français Doha; AJ+ Español Mexico City
- Country of origin: United States (English, Spanish); Qatar (Arabic, French)
- Area served: Worldwide
- Owner: Al Jazeera Media Network
- Services: AJ+ English; YouTube; TikTok; X Instagram; Facebook AJ+ Arabic; Facebook; X YouTube AJ+ Spanish; Facebook; X AJ+ French; Facebook; X
- Website: ajplus.net
- Launched: Soft launch: June 13, 2014 (English); April 23, 2015 (Spanish) November 30, 2015 (Arabic) December 4, 2017 (French); Full launch September 15, 2014 (English)

AJ+ (Al Jazeera Plus) is a social media publisher owned by Al Jazeera Media Network which focuses on news and current affairs. AJ+ content exists in English, Arabic, French, and Spanish. It is available on its website as well as platforms YouTube, Facebook, Instagram, TikTok, and Twitter. Prior to February 2018, it also published written content on Medium.

Work on the channel started in December 2012, shortly after Al Jazeera established an office in San Francisco. The first YouTube channel went live on December 17, 2013. The channel then had a soft launch on June 13, 2014. A full launch followed on September 15, 2014.

== History ==
Al Jazeera Media Network originally planned to launch an internet-only TV channel in 2010 as part of its social media strategy but later became preoccupied with the Arab Spring. Plans for an internet-only channel were re-launched upon the launch of Al Jazeera America when Al Jazeera Media Network had to geo-block most video from Al Jazeera English, including the channel's live stream, to satisfy concerns from cable and satellite providers in the United States. The move was met with dissatisfaction from both viewers and Al Jazeera English producers and hosts.

Also with the purchase of Current TV to use for Al Jazeera America, AJMN acquired Current's former headquarters in San Francisco. This site was perfect for the type of channel Al Jazeera wanted to build, being located in the new media center of the San Francisco Bay Area. Furthermore, the facility required little modification, as it possessed an infrastructure already optimized for digital media, a legacy of Current TV’s original user-generated format.

In January 2012, the network's social media team relocated some of its staff to San Francisco to focus on building AJ+. After months of research and numerous pilots, the AJMN executive management were convinced of the project, and provided funding and resources to scale. AJ+ is the first project incubated out of Al Jazeera's Innovation & Incubation Department.

In October 2013, it was announced that Al Jazeera Media Network would establish an Internet-only TV channel called AJ+ based in San Francisco to launch sometime in 2014. Under the direction of a strategy team comprising Riyaad Minty, Moeed Ahmad, and Muhammad Cajee, the channel underwent a year of development before releasing test content on YouTube in late 2013.

Al Jazeera’s public relations department officially soft-launched the channel on June 13, 2014. This rollout featured the release of several YouTube videos, a redesigned website and logo, and a Facebook page called AJ+ Community. The soft launch took place during a presentation by Al Jazeera on new media at the Global Editors Network summit in Barcelona. In July 2014, the channel created a fellowship program and issued a call for fellows from five regions of the world: North America, South America, the Middle East, Europe, the Asia Pacific and Sub-Saharan Africa. In August 2014, the channel branched out to Instagram.

On September 15, 2014, the channel launched fully with the release of its mobile app. The launch was attended by Al Jazeera Media Network Director General Mostefa Souag, who stated that "AJ reshaped media in 1996 when it launched, Sept 15th marks the new phase of change with AJ+".

AJ+ Español soft-launched in April 2015 to start testing content in a different language. According to Variety, AJ+ became the second largest news video producer on Facebook, after NowThis News, in June 2015. At the time, they were the ninth largest video producer on the platform overall. On August 12, 2015, AJ+ announced the appointment of its first managing director, Dima Khatib. That same month, AJ+ also released data showing that it was reaching six times as many users as had already 'liked' the page, making the network's Facebook page one of the most engaged news brands in the world. As of April 2018, its Facebook page had obtained over ten million 'likes' from users. In October 2015, AJ+ announced that the channel had reached over one billion views across its platforms.

In 2017, AJ+ launched a French-language version of the service. In 2018, the English version of the channel moved its operations to Washington D.C. In February 2018, AJ+ ceased publishing new content on Medium. In April of the same year, AJ+ ended the use of its mobile apps, moving to content distribution over its website, various social media and YouTube. In September 2020, the US Department of Justice (DOJ) ordered AJ+ to register under the Foreign Agents Registration Act (FARA) in the United States, with the Trump Administration charging that the channel engaged in political activities, and was directed and controlled by the royal family of Qatar. Al Jazeera condemned the decision, and suggested that it came as the result of a precondition set by United Arab Emirates to sign the Israel–United Arab Emirates peace agreement. The DOJ has not done anything to enforce the order.

In 2019, AJ+ produced and published an Arabic-language video that denied and minimized the Holocaust, asserting that the global Jewish community uses "financial resources [and] media institutions" to exaggerate Jewish suffering for the benefit of the State of Israel. The video was translated into English by Middle East Media Research Institute (MEMRI TV), sparking widespread outcry against Al Jazeera, and condemnation from Israeli government officials. In response, Al Jazeera took down the video and suspended two of its journalists, stating that the video "contravened the network's editorial standards." The video stated that "[the] number [of Jews murdered in the Holocaust] had been exaggerated and 'adopted by the Zionist movement', and that Israel is the 'biggest winner' from the genocide." The video also renewed long-standing criticism of the differences between Al Jazeera's Arabic content and English content; critics have stated that the organization adheres to a liberal, left-wing, and secularist approach with its English content and a conservative, right-wing, and Islamist approach in its Arabic content.

== Format ==
AJ+ produces video and media directly to social platforms (Facebook, YouTube, Twitter and Instagram), through native apps on mobile devices (iOS and Android) and smart TV platforms (Apple TV, Android TV, and Amazon Fire TV).

AJ+ is separate from Al Jazeera's other cable and satellite news channels, though it shares the network's current 68 bureaus with the other channels.

The channel is headquartered in Washington D.C. Originally, it was headquartered San Francisco, California, in the expanded former headquarters and studio of Current TV. The channel has branch offices in Doha, Istanbul, Rio de Janeiro, Kuala Lumpur and Nairobi. It also collects and creates content through freelancers in other areas of interest.

Despite being based in the United States, the content of the channel is formatted for a global audience, similarly to Al Jazeera English. The channel has no hosts or anchors, and live reporting plays a lesser role. Most content is available on demand.

AJ+ offers news coverage from around the world, and also covers topics like lifestyle, culture and technology, with very little text. Its videos range from 15 seconds to 10 minutes. The channel is experimenting with various storytelling formats. It has supported a high level of user interactions in the app and on its Facebook, YouTube and Twitter platforms.

Videos from the channel were occasionally featured on the website of Al Jazeera English and the former Al Jazeera America, as a further in-depth feature if the site is covering the same topic.

== Video format ==
- Real Time – Breaking and topical news published directly to social feeds, ranging in length from 30 seconds to three minutes
- In Depth – Video features, contextual background pieces, monthly themes, and shows
  - Animated Explainers
  - Satire
  - Current Events
  - AJ+ Asks
- Short Docs – documentaries generally ranging in length from 6–10 minutes
- Video Journalists – Correspondent pieces shot on location around the world.
- TED & AJ+ – explainers in cooperation with TED

== Former mobile app ==
The AJ+ Mobile App was launched in September 2014 on iOS and Android platforms, and was used until April 2018. The app employed a card and stack structure for navigation, and focused primarily on user and social engagement.

== Awards and honors ==
- In 2015, AJ+ won a Webby Award for Online Film & Video, News & Information
- At the 2015 Webby Awards, AJ+ was also honored in the categories of
  - Online Film & Video, News & Politics: Individual Episode (Ayotzinapa Student Killings Ignite Mexico and the Internet)
  - Online Film & Video, Documentary: Series (AJ+ Short Docs)
  - Mobile Sites & Apps, News (AJ+ Mobile App)
- In 2015, the AJ+ Mobile App was a finalist for the Society for News Design's World's Best Digital Design award

== Editorial line and influence of Qatar ==
The French National Audiovisual Institute has criticized AJ+ for its practice of generating viewer engagement through what it sees as one-sided reporting on emotional topics. The institute claims that three quarters of AJ+ posts on Twitter mentioned the Israeli–Palestinian conflict or racism and police violence in the Western world, and that the alleged editorial line of the channel serves to further the ideological influence of Qatar and presents ideological similarities with the Muslim Brotherhood.

== See also ==
- Al Jazeera Media Network
- Al Jazeera English
- Al Jazeera America
- Al Jazeera controversies
- Al Jazeera Arabic
