= Divya Gopalan =

British journalist

- Born: Hong Kong
- Occupation: Broadcast journalist
- Employer: TaiwanPlus

Divya Gopalan is a broadcast journalist who currently works for TaiwanPlus, where she presents the programme Connected. The programme was formerly known as Connected with Divya Gopalan.

== Early life and background ==
Gopalan was born in Hong Kong to a family of Indian origin from Kerala.

== Broadcasting career ==
Gopalan began her broadcasting career as a sports correspondent. She subsequently became a television newsreader in Hong Kong before joining the BBC, where she was based in London.

She has also worked for CNN, NBC and CNBC in Hong Kong.

=== Al Jazeera ===
Gopalan joined Al Jazeera English in 2006, shortly before the channel's launch. She was one of the original news presenters at its former broadcast centre in Kuala Lumpur, Malaysia. She later became an anchor at Al Jazeera English's main broadcast centre in Doha, Qatar, where she presented Newshour.

In addition to news presentation, Gopalan has hosted studio-based interview programmes, including Inside Story and its weekly counterpart, Inside Syria. In 2013, she worked as a field correspondent,
