= Joie Chen =

Broadcast journalist

- Born: Joie Chen
- Education: Northwestern (BA); Northwestern (MA)
- Occupation: News anchor
- Years active: 1985–present
- Known for: anchor, CNN; Al Jazeera America America Tonight anchor White House Correspondent, CBS News

Joie Chen (born 28 August 1961) is a Chinese American television journalist as well as an Asian American broadcast journalist. She was the anchor of Al Jazeera America's flagship evening news show America Tonight, which was launched in August 2013. In January 2016, the channel announced it would close on 12 April 2016.

Chen has been a Washington-based correspondent for CBS News, reporting from the White House, Capitol Hill and other beats for all of the network's programming. She also contributed to CBS Sunday Morning and won an Emmy for her coverage of the D.C. sniper attacks. She has been an anchor at CNN and CNN International, covering world affairs and domestic issues, and she reported for USA Today on TV.

In 2018, Chen was named director of Northwestern University's Washington D.C.–based Medill School of Journalism programs. She is currently Advisor and Faculty at the Poynter Institute in Washington, DC.

== Career ==
=== Early career ===
Before CNN, she worked for six years as a reporter and anchor at Atlanta's WXIA-TV in Atlanta from 1985 to 1991, and also as a correspondent for USA Today on TV. She began her broadcast journalism career at WCIV-TV in Charleston, South Carolina, as a reporter and producer, but soon decided she had more talent as the former. Chen received her bachelor's and master's degrees in journalism from the Medill School of Journalism at Northwestern University. She is a member of the Medill Board of Advisors, and also serves on the Accrediting Council on Education in Journalism and Mass Communications, as the representative from the Asian American Journalists Association.

=== CNN ===
Chen worked at CNN from 1991 to 2001 for CNN International and for the network's domestic operations. She covered the U.S. military operations in Somalia and Bosnia, anchored the coverage of the Columbine High School shootings, the trial of Oklahoma City bomber Timothy McVeigh, and won an Emmy award for her anchor work covering the bombing at Centennial Olympic Park during the 1996 Atlanta Games. In 1997, Chen received the CableACE Award for Best Newscaster, along with Leon Harris, her co-anchor on The World Today . Chen created and anchored the network's first effort to include its online audience in its broadcasting, CNN NewsSite with Joie Chen.

=== CBS ===
From 2002 until 2008, Chen worked as a White House and Capitol Hill correspondent at CBS News in Washington D.C., and contributed regularly to the network's long-form program CBS Sunday Morning. She anchored the network's coverage of the September 11 attacks in 2001, the War in Afghanistan, and every day of three-week Beltway sniper attacks in 2002, which won an Emmy. During her time at CBS, she was the only minority female to rank among the 50 most visible network correspondents.

Joie Chen is not to be confused with Julie Chen, who also worked at CBS at the time.

=== Branded News Worldwide ===
In 2008, Chen left daily journalism to become Executive Vice President at Branded News Worldwide, which developed online platforms to deliver news and information to niche audiences, and a principal at the media consulting firm Way Forward Media. She was responsible for helping to develop news and programming models for clients, building and staffing newsrooms, and creating new lines of business.

=== Al Jazeera America ===
In the summer of 2013, Joie Chen joined Al Jazeera America to become sole anchor of their flagship news program, America Tonight. The show went live on 20 August 2013. Presenting long form TV nightly news, Chen covered a range of human interest stories in the United States, and domestic and international news stories. The network ceased broadcasting on April 12, 2016.

== Personal life ==
Joie Chen lives in Bethesda, Maryland, with her husband, Michael, and her son, Evan.
