= Al Jazeera America =

Defunct pay television news channel

- Country: United States
- Broadcast area: United States
- Network: Al Jazeera
- Headquarters: Manhattan Center; New York City, New York

Programming
- Language: English

Ownership
- Owner: Al Jazeera Media Network
- Key people: Kate O'Brian; President; Al Anstey; Interim CEO
- Sister channels: Al Jazeera English; AJ+ beIN Sport

History
- Launched: August 20, 2013
- Replaced: Current TV
- Closed: April 12, 2016
- Replaced by: Al Jazeera English

Al Jazeera America was an American pay television news channel owned by the Al Jazeera Media Network. The channel was launched on August 20, 2013, to compete with CNN, HLN, MSNBC, Fox News, and in certain markets RT America. It was Al Jazeera's second entry into the U.S. television market, after the launch of beIN Sports in 2012. The channel, which had persistently low ratings, announced in January 2016 that it would close in April of that year.

Al Jazeera America was headquartered and run from studios on the first floor of the Manhattan Center in New York City. It also had a total of 12 bureaus located in places such as Washington, D.C., at the channel's D.C. studios at the Newseum and Al Jazeera's D.C. hub, Chicago, Detroit, Nashville, Los Angeles, Seattle, New Orleans, Dallas, Denver, Miami, and San Francisco (former headquarters of Current TV and current headquarters of online channel AJ+).

The channel was the sister channel of Al Jazeera's international English language news channel Al Jazeera English. Although operated and managed completely separately with America's management based in the United States, the two shared United States studios and bureaus, such as the D.C. hub, and Al Jazeera America ran some of Al Jazeera English's programming and many of its live newscasts alongside its own.

== History ==
=== Creation ===
The creation of Al Jazeera America was announced on January 2, 2013, along with the announcement that the network had purchased the user-generated content channel turned progressive-oriented pay television channel Current TV, which had long been struggling in the ratings and after two format changes had announced in October 2012 that it was considering a sale of the channel. It was reported that Al Jazeera planned on shutting down Current TV, keeping its production staff and possibly some programs, and using the company's distribution network to broadcast Al Jazeera America. Current TV, by coincidence, was formerly Newsworld International, an international news channel similar to Al Jazeera America run by the Canadian Broadcasting Corporation.

On July 22, 2013, Al Jazeera America named former ABC News Vice President Kate O'Brian as president of the network, and Ehab Al Shihabi as interim CEO in charge of business affairs. In addition, former CNN veteran David Doss was named Vice President of News Programming and former CBS News executive Marcy McGinnis was named Vice President of News Gathering. Former MSNBC executive Shannon High-Bassalik was named Senior Vice President of Documentaries and Programs.

Al Jazeera said it received more than 21,000 job applications for 400 positions at its U.S. network. Approximately 200 Current TV employees, including some 50 in editorial, were absorbed by the new operation. It planned to have a total of 800 employees at the channel's launch. Al Jazeera America also announced that the channel would employ well-known veteran journalists, anchors, and producers.

On July 3, 2013, Ali Velshi confirmed that Al Jazeera America's launch would take place on August 20, 2013. The launch took place at 3:00 p.m. Eastern Time on that date, with an hour-long preview special entitled This is Al Jazeera. News coverage began immediately afterward at 4:00 p.m. Al Jazeera America's website launched on August 8, 2013.

== Closure ==
On January 13, 2016, the Al Jazeera Media Network announced that it would shut down Al Jazeera America's pay-TV and online operations on April 30, 2016. The announcement came in the midst of a decline in the price of oil, which negatively impacted the government of Qatar, which provides funding for the Al Jazeera Media Network. The channel's last day of operation was later confirmed to be April 12. CNN subsequently reported that the closure would lead to the loss of about 700 jobs.

During its history, Al Jazeera America won several media awards, including the Peabody, Emmy, and Shorty Awards and citations from groups such as the National Association of Black Journalists and Native American Journalist Association. However, the network experienced low viewership ratings, averaging between 20,000 and 40,000 viewers on a typical day. In response, the Al Jazeera Media Network sought to shift focus to its digital presence in the United States through ventures such as AJ+.

On February 11, 2016, writing in the television trade magazine Broadcasting & Cable, industry pundit Joe Mohen proposed that the business failure of Al Jazeera America was due to its choice of the wrong distribution channel, specifically subscription television as opposed to over-the-top distribution. Mohen argued that distributing content over the internet would have had greater appeal among the young target audience of the network. In March, CNN correspondents Brian Stelter and Tom Kludt cited many reasons for the network's closure, including falling oil prices, low viewership, and poor decision making by Al Jazeera executives – specifically CEO Ehab Al Shihabi. Stelter and Kludt also suggested that political issues could have been a factor in the channel's demise. During the Bush administration, the president and other officials had openly criticized Al Jazeera for airing messages from Al-Qaeda figures. This phenomenon was cited as a potential reason for Al Jazeera America's difficulties in receiving distribution from major pay-TV providers such as Comcast and DirecTV.

On February 26, 2016, the Al Jazeera America website ceased operations. On April 12, Al Jazeera America signed off for the final time. Its final program to air was a live three-hour retrospective film titled "Your Stories" that aired twice from 3:00 p.m. Eastern Time until the shuttering. Antonio Mora and Richelle Carey, the first two anchors to appear on air when it launched in 2013, were the last two anchors to appear as the network signed off the air at 8:59 p.m. Shortly afterwards, a slide was shown with the Al Jazeera logo above a message that read "Al Jazeera America is no longer available. Thank you for watching" with the network's English web address shown below it.

During the time that Al Jazeera America was in existence, Al Jazeera English and AJE programs that were shown on Al Jazeera America were geoblocked in the United States owing to agreements with the carriers of Al Jazeera America. Programs from Al Jazeera English not shown on Al Jazeera America (such as Empire and UpFront) were some of the few unblocked during this time and therefore visible on Al Jazeera English's website. In September 2016, Al Jazeera English's online live stream and the programs that were blocked in the United States during Al Jazeera America's existence were officially unblocked in the United States, making them viewable for the first time since 2013.

== Content and programs ==
It was announced that 60% of the channel's programming would be produced in America, while an additional 40% would come from Al Jazeera English. That was later changed to almost all of the channel's program content being sourced from the United States. In an interview with The New York Times, head of international operations Ehab Al Shihabi said Al Jazeera America's content would on most days primarily concern domestic affairs. However, Shihabi added, "Al Jazeera's seventy bureaus around the world will mean that we will have an unparalleled ability to report on important global stories that Americans are not seeing elsewhere. We will do that when it is warranted."

Al Shihabi said that the channel would feature less political discussion and celebrity news and that news gathering would take priority over maximizing profits (the network was to air only six minutes of commercials per hour, a rate far less than competing networks). Its three-hour morning program was to have a different format focusing on hard news and not "a group of anchors chatting on a couch".

Al Jazeera America aired live programming at all hours, including half-hour news bulletins. Three Al Jazeera English programs that were based in Washington, The Stream, Inside Story and Fault Lines were included on the launch schedule, as well as The Frost Interview and Listening Post. The flagship nighttime show was called America Tonight. It was a weeknight news magazine that presented the day's news in Al Jazeera's long-form style with "stories that are not covered elsewhere".

Al Jazeera America's original senior executive producer for news and special projects was Bob Wheelock, a former senior producer for ABC and NBC News. Wheelock left the network shortly after the launch to head up a political campaign in Delaware. CNN chief business correspondent and the anchor of Your Money, Ali Velshi was the first major name to join Al Jazeera America. He hosted a daily, half-hour show originally called Real Money with Ali Velshi, (later called Ali Velshi on Target). The show was originally going to be once a week until the end of 2013 when it was re-launched as a daily show.

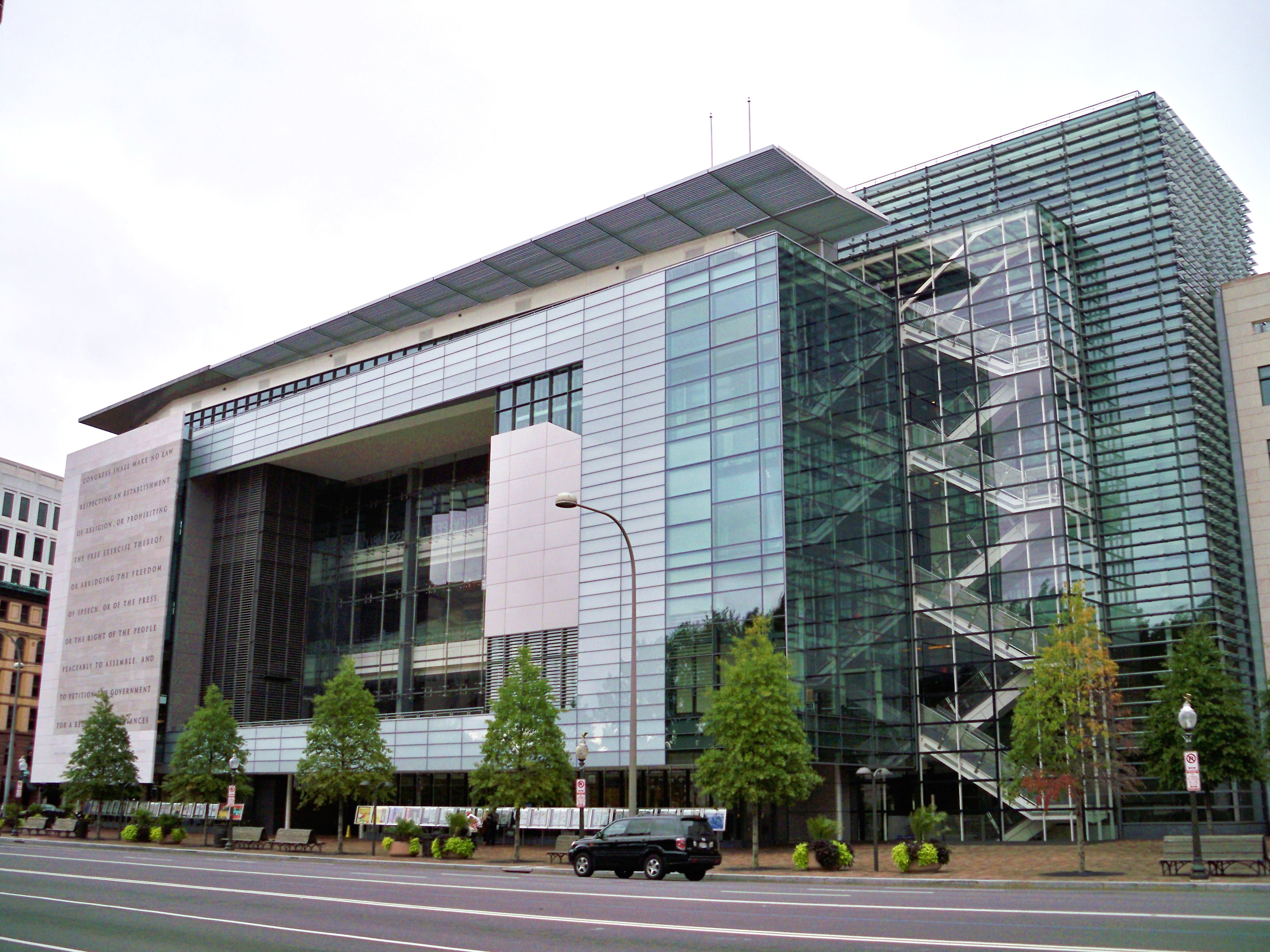
Newseum Home of Al Jazeera America's former premiere D.C. studio and America Tonight

The channel also hired Kim Bondy, a former executive producer with CNN to produce its flagship news program America Tonight, a news magazine program that was hosted by original CNN International anchor and former CBS News correspondent Joie Chen, produced from Al Jazeera America's Newseum studio in Washington, D.C., and featuring correspondents Adam May, Lori Jane Gliha, former CBS, ABC and CBC news correspondent Sheila MacVicar and former Current TV correspondent Christof Putzel. The program presented in-depth segments each night on the economy, government, education, healthcare and the environment, and include breaking news stories. The program also featured work by the Al Jazeera America investigative unit and covers stories in depth from across America, revealing new insights on the news of the day and breaking stories with its own original reporting. America Tonight also incorporated social media interaction on screen and off to reflect the views of its American audience. On July 1, 2013, longtime CNN anchor Soledad O'Brien was hired to be a special correspondent for America Tonight, as well as a deal with her production company Starfish Media Group to produce long-form documentaries for Al Jazeera America.

An American version of the popular Al Jazeera English program The Stream was originally featured on the channel. Produced from Al Jazeera's Washington, D.C. hub, and hosted by veteran journalist and former ABC News correspondent Lisa Fletcher. The show formatted to allow viewers to interact with Fletcher and her guests during the program via Twitter, Facebook, Google+ Hangouts and Skype. The show's social media team and second screen technology enabled viewers to engage 24 hours a day with new content, comments, user-generated videos and a variety of posts. The Stream relied heavily on a variety of online resources and social media tools to connect with people across the United States and around the world. This includes "Storify", which allowed the aggregation of additional information, links, and photos about show topics on the website; "Video Genie", which enables viewers to leave video questions for the show 24–7; and Twitter, Facebook, Pinterest, and Reddit. It also hosted Google+ Hangouts and uses Skype rather than satellite feeds for nearly all guest interviews. Less hard-news orientated than Al Jazeera America's other shows, guests included everyone from civil rights group leaders to Kathy Griffin.

On July 21, 2013, the network hired former Fox News, MSNBC, and Current TV veteran David Shuster to host a show during "the evening hours". Shuster became an analyst on the midday and evening news on the channel as well as a fill in host. It later hired Andrea Stone, most recently of The Huffington Post, and Tony Karon, most recently of Time, to manage both U.S. and global coverage for the channel's website and other digital platforms. The two were responsible for determining the overall editorial direction for the site and were based in New York City.

On July 26, 2013, the network announced that former Good Morning America host and award-winning journalist Antonio Mora would host a current events talk show called Consider This, a program which showcased "hard-hitting interviews and panel discussions on issues important to American viewers". Consider This also featured interactive segments where the audience will join the conversation via social media. The first episode of the show highlighted the hunger strike and court-approved force-feeding in California's prison system. After the show's cancellation during a schedule re-do to raise ratings and lower costs Mora anchored the late news. The show was replaced by a similar program Third Rail.

Kathy Davidov and Cynthia Kane were hired as the senior executive producer and senior producer for its in-house documentary film unit. Davidov came from the National Geographic Channel, where she produced shows such as Border Wars and the Explorer special. Kane came from ITVS, where she managed over 150 projects and worked with the Sundance Channel.

On April 13, 2014, the channel began showing Borderland, a documentary series on illegal immigration which follows six Americans as they retrace the fatal journey of three undocumented migrants who died attempting to cross into the United States. Borderland was the first such documentary series for the channel. A second one called The System focused on the U.S. prison system.

== Investigative reporting ==
The channel had a 16-person investigative unit and hired veteran National Headline Award-winning journalist Edward Pound (formerly of The New York Times, The Wall Street Journal, USA Today, U.S. News & World Report and the National Journal) to lead its investigation division. Josh Bernstein of Denver Fox affiliate KDVR was hired as the lead investigative reporter, along with Trevor Aaronson, an award-winning author and investigative journalist and the former co-founder and associate director of the nonprofit Florida Center for Investigative Reporting who served as the networks investigative digital reporter based in Washington, D.C. This was in addition to the Al Jazeera Investigative Reporting Unit controlled by Al Jazeera English.

Al Jazeera America was the first television national news outlet to report in-depth on the Flint water crisis on January 22, 2015.

== News staff ==
Al Jazeera America's news anchors included:

- Randall Pinkston (formerly of CBS News)
- John Seigenthaler (formerly of NBC News and WSMV in Nashville)
- Antonio Mora (formerly of ABC News)
- Richelle Carey (formerly of CNN and HLN)
- Jonathan Betz (formerly of WFAA in Dallas and WWL-TV in New Orleans)
- Tony Harris (formerly of sister station Al Jazeera English and CNN)
- Del Walters (formerly of WJLA in Washington, D.C. and WMAR of Baltimore, MD)
- Stephanie Sy (formerly of ABC News)

=== Other people ===
Mike Viqueira was hired on June 5, 2013, to be Al Jazeera America's first White House correspondent.

In November 2013, Al Jazeera America hired Ray Suarez, formerly of PBS Newshour, to host Inside Story.

== Former programming ==
=== Produced by Al Jazeera America ===
- Ali Velshi on Target (formerly Real Money with Ali Velshi) – A show hosted by Ali Velshi from New York City that focuses on current affairs which provides context and analysis around current political and economic issues along with interviews.
- Inside Story – Hosted by Ray Suarez from Washington D.C. Show provides analysis, background and context on the top stories of the day. Each episode features a panel of expert guests who examine and debate domestic and international topics ripped from the headlines. The Al Jazeera English version continues.
- America Tonight – Al Jazeera America's flagship show, Hosted by Joie Chen from the Newseum in Washington D.C., a 30-minute-long news and current affairs magazine. Segments feature in-depth reports on subjects such as the economy, government, education, healthcare, and the environment, as well as breaking news featuring correspondents from across the country.
- Your World This Morning – Hosted by Stephanie Sy, Del Walters, and Nicole Mitchell (Weather) from New York City, Morning block of national and international news.
- News – Domestic and international News from New York City, hosted by various anchors including Tony Harris, Antonio Mora and John Seigenthaler.
- Talk To Al Jazeera – Interview program with prominent world figures by various anchors and journalists.
- Fault Lines – Hosted by Josh Rushing, Zeina Awad, and Sebastian Walker, A show that takes viewers behind a particular story and reports on it in-depth using in-depth interviews and investigative reporting. The show continues on Al Jazeera English.
- TechKnow – Hosted by Phil Torres and others from Los Angeles, a Fast-paced, 30-minute show that explores and exposes how the latest scientific discoveries are changing our lives. The show was taken over by Al Jazeera English after shutdown.
- Compass With Sheila Macvicar – Hosted by Sheila MacVicar, program focuses on foreign policy issues.
- Third Rail – Hosted by Ali Velshi (formerly Imran Garda), weekly current affairs program tackling controversial issues and probe perspectives with moderated debate, three-person panels and reports from Al Jazeera correspondents around the world.
- Al Jazeera America Presents – Documentary and investigative series focused on a specific topic such as Borderland and The System.
- Consider This – Weeknight current affairs talk show with Antonio Mora from New York City. Show featured interviews with prominent newsmakers, panel discussions that provide insight through varied perspectives and involvement of the show's audience using social media.
- Power Politics – Hosted by David Shuster from New York City, a political analysis show featuring in-depth looks into issues topping the poles (produced during U.S. election seasons).
- The Stream (American Version) – Hosted by Lisa Fletcher and Wajahat Ali from Washington, D.C., Current events discussion and debate show formatted to allow viewers to interact with the hosts and guests during the program via Twitter, Facebook, Google+ Hangouts and Skype. The Al Jazeera English version continues.

=== Produced/provided by Al Jazeera English ===
- News from Al Jazeera English:
  - World news live from Al Jazeera's Doha broadcast centre
  - World news live from Al Jazeera's London broadcast centre
  - Newshour – an hour of world news and sport hosted from both of Al Jazeera English's broadcast centres in Doha and London.
- Listening Post – Hosted by Richard Gizbert from London, Current affairs program that critiques journalism and the media industry around the world.
- 101 East – the weekly documentary series for issues of particular importance in Asia. Presenters or hosts have included Teymoor Nabili and Fauziah Ibrahim
- People & Power – biweekly program, originally hosted by Shereen El Feki.
- Witness – the daily documentary-slot for films by the best of the world's independent film-makers. The strand aims to shine a light on the events and people long-forgotten by the global media and on those which never merited a mention in the first place.
- The Frost Interview (previously Frost Over The World) was hosted by David Frost. Frost died in 2013, and show still aired posthumously with the family's consent.

=== Produced jointly ===
- Al Jazeera Investigates – documentaries arising from the work of the Al Jazeera Investigative Unit.

=== Imported ===
- The Truth Is – series imported from Australia.

Also airing at various times were the Al Jazeera English programs Earthrise, Al Jazeera World and Al Jazeera Correspondent along with shows brought in from other channels in the UK and Australia.

== Notable staff ==
=== Management ===
- Kate O'Brian – President of Al Jazeera America

=== On-air staff ===
A complete list of hosts and correspondents is located in the box at the bottom.

==== Anchors and hosts ====
- Jonathan Betz – anchor/reporter
- Richelle Carey – anchor/reporter
- Joie Chen – host of America Tonight
- Tony Harris – anchor of Early Evening News
- Sheila MacVicar – host of Compass with Sheila MacVicar and America Tonight correspondent
- Nicole Mitchell – meteorologist (moved to KSTP-TV in Minneapolis)
- Antonio Mora – anchor of International Newshour
- Randall Pinkston – anchor/reporter
- Cara Santa Maria – host of TechKnow
- John Seigenthaler – host of Nightly News
- David Shuster – anchor/reporter, and host of Power Politics
- John Henry Smith – anchor/reporter
- Ray Suarez – host of Inside Story
- Stephanie Sy – anchor
- Ali Velshi – host of On Target and Third Rail (now at MSNBC)

=== Correspondents ===
- Chris Bury – reporter and America Tonight correspondent
- Melissa Chan – San Francisco correspondent
- Lisa Fletcher – Correspondent and fill-in host
- Jami Floyd – contributor/legal contributor
- Lori Jane Gliha – America Tonight correspondent
- Sheila MacVicar – America Tonight correspondent
- Adam May – America Tonight correspondent
- Soledad O'Brien – special correspondent
- Christof Putzel – America Tonight correspondent
- Ash-har Quraishi – Chicago bureau reporter
- Josh Rushing – Faultlines host/reporter
- Roxana Saberi – correspondent
- William Schneider – political analyst and contributor
- Michael Shure – contributor/political contributor
- John Terrett – correspondent
- Mike Viqueira – White House correspondent
- Sebastian Walker – correspondent
- Jacob Ward – Science and Technology correspondent

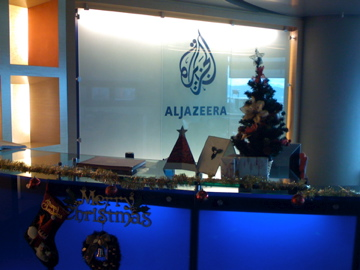
Al Jazeera Office, Kuala Lumpur

== Awards ==
In 2014, Al Jazeera America and producer Reed Lindsay won a Gracie Award in the "Outstanding Hard News Feature" category from the Alliance for Women in Media Foundation for the story "Fists of Fury", which aired on America Tonight. The award was the first award ever for the channel.

Al Jazeera America also won a Shorty Award for "Best News Twitter Account".

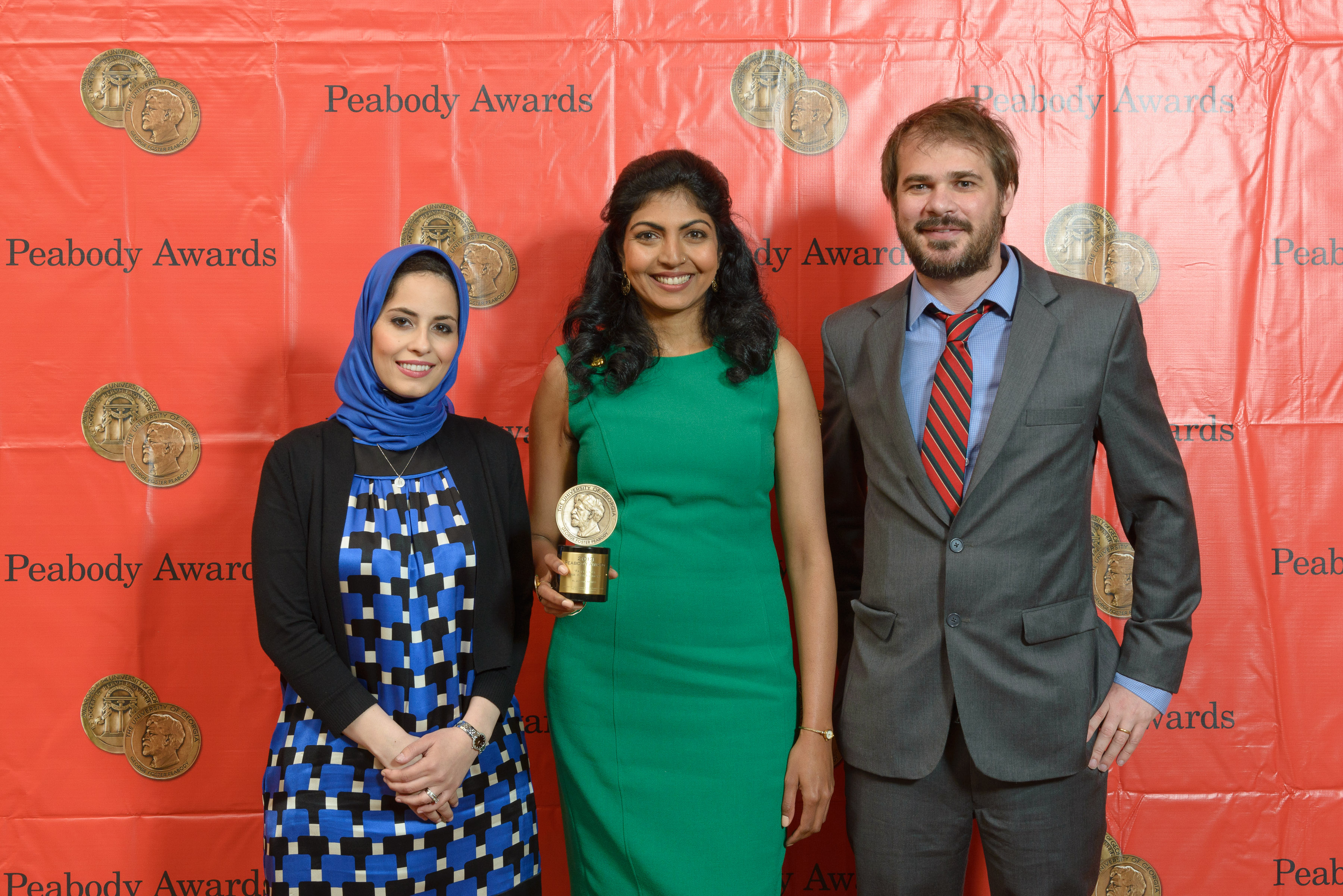
The crew of "Made in Bangladesh" at the 73rd Annual Peabody Awards

The Al Jazeera America show Fault Lines won two Peabody Awards in 2013 for the episodes "Haiti in a Time of Cholera" and "Made in Bangladesh".

The channel and Fault Lines also won a Robert F. Kennedy Journalism Award for "Made in Bangladesh".

On September 30, 2014, Fault Lines won a News & Documentary Emmy Award in the Investigative Journalism News-magazine category for "Haiti in a Time of Cholera".

In early 2015, Al Jazeera America's digital team was recognized with an Award of Excellence for Photo Editing Portfolio in the Pictures of the Year International competition.

In April 2015, Al Jazeera America won 16 National Headliner Awards including seven first place wins in various categories including "Broadcast television networks, cable networks and syndicators environmental reporting" where It held all three top nomination spots with the Fault Lines episode "Water for Coal" winning overall, "Broadcast television networks, cable networks and syndicators investigative report" and "Best of TV" where the Fault Lines episode "Deadly Force" won, "Broadcast television networks, cable networks and syndicators documentary or series of reports" where the documentary "Killing the Messenger" won, "Broadcast television networks, cable networks and syndicators coverage of a major news event" where they also held the top three places with their coverage of "The Downing of MH14" winning, "Broadcast television networks, cable networks and syndicators newscast" where their coverage of the "Crisis in Yemen" and "ISIL on the Turkish Border" won and "online slideshow" for its digital team.

== Incidents ==
While covering the Ferguson protests in 2014, officers from the Ferguson Police Department shot rubber bullets and tear gas at an AJAM news crew including correspondent Ash-har Quraishi, who after yelling, "We're the press" caused them to abandon their recording equipment and run to safety. The incident was caught on camera by KSDK-TV, a local NBC affiliate who was filming from across the street. An officer was captured on video turning the reporters' video camera toward the ground and dismantling their equipment. Other incidents, including the arrests of two print journalists for The Washington Post and The Huffington Post, also occurred during the same time period.

== Controversies ==
On April 28, 2015, Matthew Luke, Al Jazeera America's former Supervisor of Media and Archive Management, filed a US$15 million lawsuit against his former employers over unfair dismissal. Luke alleged that he had been unfairly dismissed by the network after he had raised concerns with the human resource division that his boss, Osman Mahmud, the Senior Vice-President of Broadcast Operations and Technology, discriminated against female employees and made anti-Semitic remarks. In response, Ehab Al Shihabi, the head of Al Jazeera America, has announced that the network will contest the lawsuit in court. Mahmud has also denied Luke's charges and has alleged that Luke was a difficult employee. In an unrelated development, two female Al Jazeera America employees—Diana Lee, the Executive Vice-President for Human Resources, and Dawn Bridges, the Executive Vice President for Communications, had resigned that week.

On May 4, 2015, Marcy McGinnis, a senior Al Jazeera America's executive and former CBS news anchor, resigned from the company for undisclosed reasons amidst internal dissension with AJAM's management. On May 5, 2015, Al Jazeera Media Network demoted Al Shihabi to Chief Operations Officer (COO) of Al Jazeera America. He was demoted from CEO after a report from The New York Times of an altercation between him and host Ali Velshi where he attempted to fire and sue the channel's top host. He was replaced by Al Anstey, the former managing director of Al Jazeera English. On June 11, 2015, Shannon High-Bassalik, AJAM's former senior vice president of programming and documentaries, filed a multi-million lawsuit against the channel; alleging a biased pro-Arab coverage and the mistreatment of employees. AJAM has responded that they would contest the lawsuit in court.

On November 8, 2015, it was reported that Al Jazeera America's general counsel, David W. Harleston, did not have a license to practice law. Harleston had previously dealt with several lawsuits involving DirecTV and Al Gore, several wrongful termination cases by former employees, and the departure of the company's chief executive, Al Shihabi.

=== Reactions to "The Dark Side: Secrets of the Sports Dopers" documentary ===
On December 27, 2015, Al Jazeera English released a report, aired on Al Jazeera America, conducted by the Al Jazeera Investigative Unit via Al Jazeera Investigates called "The Dark Side: Secrets of the Sports Dopers", which investigated professional athletes' alleged use of Performance-enhancing drugs (PEDs), naming Peyton Manning and other prominent athletes as having received drugs from Charles Sly, a pharmacist who had worked at the Guyer Anti-Aging Clinic in Indianapolis during the fall of 2011.

The Huffington Post leaked the reports a day before Al Jazeera's publication. Then, Manning told ESPN's Lisa Salters about the reports, despite the fact that the documentary had not yet been aired, in an interview on the morning of the 27th for ESPN Sunday NFL Countdown calling them "completely fabricated" and "garbage". He also expressed his anger that his wife, Ashley, had been mentioned in the documentary. Salters pointed to other cases in which athletes initially deny, and then eventually admit allegations, but Manning replied that he could not speak for others. Nevertheless, Manning also stated he had visited the Guyer Institute 35 times during 2011 and that he had received both medication and treatment from Guyer during this time.

Sly recanted his story and requested the report not to be aired via a YouTube video following the release of the report. Sly later said he had never seen the Mannings and told ESPN's Chris Mortensen that he is not a pharmacist and was not at the Guyer Institute in 2011, as Al Jazeera claimed. However, state licensing records indicate that someone named "Charles David Sly" was licensed as a pharmacy intern in Indiana from April 2010 to May 2013 and that his license expired May 1, 2013.

Manning decided to respond to the further allegations against him, and hired former George W. Bush press secretary Ari Fleischer to manage the issue. He also threatened to sue Al Jazeera but then decided against doing so.

On January 5, 2016, it was announced that Ryan Howard and Ryan Zimmerman had filed civil lawsuits suing Al Jazeera for defamation following the publication's release of the documentary which linked them. In 2023, both lawsuits were dropped and dismissed with prejudice, with each of the parties bearing their own costs for the lawsuits.

== See also ==
- Al Jazeera America News
- Al Jazeera Media Network
