= Christof Putzel =

American reporter

- Born: 1979 (age 46–47); Washington, D.C., U.S.
- Education: Connecticut College (BA)
- Occupations: Journalist, correspondent
- Years active: 2003–present
- Notable credit(s): Vanguard; America Tonight; Travel Channel

Christof Putzel is an American journalist and correspondent for Travel Channel. He is a former correspondent for Al Jazeera America's news magazine America Tonight and Current TV's investigative documentary series, Vanguard.

== Career ==
Christof began his production career while an undergraduate at Connecticut College, where he produced his first documentary, "Left Behind," about AIDS orphans in Kenya. The film won over a dozen awards at film festivals, including a Student Academy Award, the International Documentary Association's David Wolper Award, and HBO Films Best Student Film Award.

Christof joined Current TV in 2005 as one of the network's first employees. The following year, he was nominated for his first Emmy for his report from Mogadishu, Somalia about the rise and fall of the Islamic Court Union. He trekked in the jungles of the Democratic Republic of Congo to cover the exploitation of child gold miners, made the treacherous journey through the desert to cross the Mexico/US border with migrants trying to reach American soil, and camped on the southern shores of Yemen, where he discovered the bodies of more than two-dozen refugees who drowned attempting to escape the violence in Somalia.

His documentary, "From Russia with Hate," about the rise of violent attacks against immigrants in Moscow by neo-Nazi skinheads, won Columbia University's Alfred I. DuPont Award and the prestigious Livingston Award for International Reporting. He was nominated for his third Emmy for "Lost in Democracy," a documentary about the first democratic elections held in the tiny Himalayan Kingdom of Bhutan.

In 2012, "Sex, Lies, and Cigarettes," a documentary centered around Aldi, "the Indonesian smoking baby," went viral after exposing Philip Morris's marketing practices in the developing world. It won an Overseas Press Club Award, a PRISM Award, and was nominated for an Emmy.

In 2013, Christof was awarded his second Alfred I. duPont–Columbia University Award for "Arming the Mexican Cartels," a documentary investigating gun trafficking into Mexico from the United States.

When Current TV was sold to Al Jazeera Media in 2013, Putzel became a senior correspondent for the network's flagship news magazine, America Tonight.

== Personal life ==
Putzel is a third-generation news reporter. His father, Michael Putzel, covered the Vietnam War and the White House for the Associated Press. His mother, Ann Blackman, was a correspondent for Time and a reporter for the Associated Press. His grandfather, Samuel G. Blackman, was a top editor for the Associated Press.

Christof was married to Julia Taft, a great-granddaughter of late Robert A. Taft, Republican senator from Ohio, and a great-great-granddaughter of President and Chief Justice William Howard Taft. They divorced in 2014.

== Awards ==
Year	Award	Organization	Work	Category	Result
2013	Alfred I. duPont Award	Columbia University	"Arming the Mexican Cartel"	Silver Baton	Won
2012	Carl Spielvogel Award	Overseas Press Club	"Sex, Lies, and Cigarettes"	Best International Business Reporting	Won
2012	Prism Award	Entertainment Industries Council	"Sex, Lies, and Cigarettes"	Best Documentary, News Magazine-Substance Use	Won
2012	Emmy Award	National Academy of Television Arts & Sciences	"Sex, Lies, and Cigarettes"	Outstanding Business and Economic Reporting: Longform	Nominated
2009	Emmy Award	National Academy of Television Arts & Sciences	"Lost in Democracy"	Best New Approach: Arts & Culture	Nominated
2009	Alfred I. duPont Award	Columbia University	"From Russia With Hate"	Silver Baton	Won
2008	Webby Award	International Academy of Digital Arts and Sciences	"From Russia With Hate"	Drama: Individual Episode	Won
2008	Emmy Award	National Academy of Television Arts & Sciences	"From Russia with Hate"	Best New Approach: Documentary	Nominated
2008	Emmy Award	National Academy of Television Arts & Sciences	"Mogadishu Madness"	Best New Approach: Current News Coverage	Nominated
2008	National Headliner Award	Press Club of Atlantic City	"From Russia With Hate"	First Place: Investigative Reporting	Won
2007	Livingston Award for Young Journalists	Mollie Parnis Livingston Foundation	"From Russia With Hate"	Best International Reporting	Won
2006	CINE Golden Eagle	CINE	"Party and Play"	Award of Excellence	Won
2003	Best Short Film	New York AIDS Film Festival	"Left Behind"		Won
2003	Audience Impact Award	AFI/Silverdocs	"Left Behind"		Runner Up
2003	HBO Films Award	Savannah International Film Festival	"Left Behind"	Best International Student Film	Won
2003	Student Emmy	Academy of Television Arts and Sciences	"Left Behind"	1st Place Documentary	Won
2003	Student Academy Awards	Academy of Motion Picture Arts and Sciences	"Left Behind"	Best Documentary	Won
2002	Angelus Award	Angelus Student Film Festival	"Left Behind"	Most Outstanding Nonfiction Film	Won
2002	Silver Chris Award	Columbus International Film & Video Festival	"Left Behind"	Best Student Film	Won
2002	David L. Wolper/IDA Award	International Documentary Association	"Left Behind"	Best Student Documentary	Won

== See also ==
- Adam Yamaguchi
- Al Jazeera America
- Current TV
- Mariana van Zeller
- Vanguard
