= Everton Fox =

British weather presenter

Everton Fox is a British weather presenter, currently working for Al Jazeera English and is notable for being the first ever black weather-presenter to appear on the BBC.

== Career ==
Fox worked for the then Department of Social Security as a civil servant and in 1991 joined the Met Office, completing the forecaster foundation programme in March 2000. He joined the BBC Weather Centre in 2000, working initially on BBC World and BFBS television. He went on to become BBC Radio 5 Live's main weather forecaster, and also appeared regularly on BBC News 24 and BBC World.

Fox left the BBC in February 2007 to join Al Jazeera English.
