= Sheila MacVicar =

Canadian television journalist

Sheila MacVicar is a Canadian television journalist most recently with Al Jazeera America as the host of Compass with Sheila MacVicar and a correspondent for America Tonight from 2013 to 2016.

== Biography ==
A native of Montreal, she graduated from Carleton University in 1977 with a Bachelor of Journalism.

She worked for CBS News from 2005 until 2010 as the network's London correspondent. She has also worked as a reporter for CBC Television (1981–1990), ABC News (1990–2001) and CNN (2001–2005). From 1977 she worked at CBC affiliated stations in Calgary and Montreal.

MacVicar reported on a connection between Osama Bin Laden and Saddam Hussein on January 14, 1999 on ABC News.

MacVicar is executive producer of the American Masters documentary: The Disappearance of Hazel Scott will air on PBS stations on February 21, 2025.

== Awards and recognition ==
- Emmy Awards (3 awards)
- Peabody Award (1 award)
- One World Broadcasting Trust (media award; 1998)
