= Mike Viqueira =

American news reporter

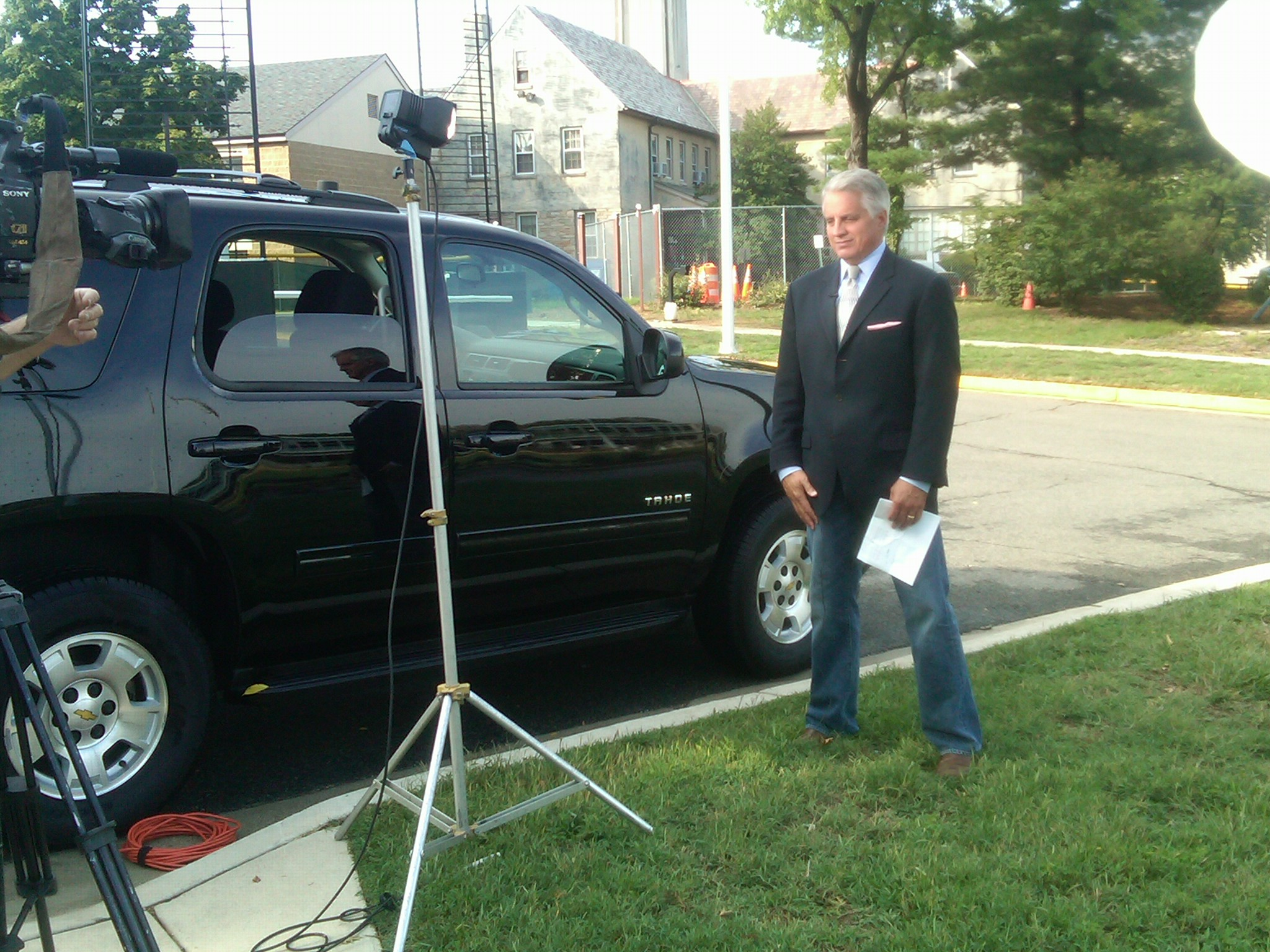
- Mike Viqueira reporting for NBC Nightly News in August 2011
- Occupation: Reporter

Michael Viqueira is the Washington Bureau Chief for NewsNation. He was White House correspondent for Al Jazeera America, which closed in 2016. Previously, he covered politics at NBC News and appeared on The Today Show, NBC Nightly News, and MSNBC.

== Early life and education ==
Viqueira is of Spanish and Italian heritage.

== Professional career ==
Viqueira began his career at NHK Japan Television, where he was an intern, producer, and radio and television correspondent. In 1998, he joined NBC News as a congressional producer, eventually becoming a congressional reporter. In 2006, he served as chairman of the Radio and Television Correspondents' Association. He was then assigned to the White House where he reported for The Today Show, NBC Nightly News, MSNBC, and The Weather Channel. On June 5, 2013, he was named Al Jazeera America's first White House correspondent, a role he held until the network folded. On January 28, 2021, NewsNation named Viqueira their Washington Bureau Chief.

== Awards ==
In 2008, Viqueira won two Emmy awards for the coverage of the bailout and the 2008 election. He also received the Joan Barone Award for Excellence in Journalism that same year, for his coverage of the bailout.
