= Randall Pinkston =

American journalist

- Born: March 3, 1950 (age 76); Yazoo County, Mississippi
- Education: Wesleyan University (2 years) Millsaps College(B.A.); University of Connecticut School of Law, Juris Doctor 1980
- Occupations: Journalist, Anchorman

Randall Pinkston was a correspondent/anchor for Al Jazeera America. Previously he was with CBS News. After a stint as a White House Correspondent in CBS's Washington Bureau, Pinkston became a general assignment reporter, contributing to CBS broadcasts, including CBS Evening News, Morning News, Weekend News, CBS News Sunday Morning and 48 Hours. Pinkston also contributed to the CBS Reports documentary, Legacy of Shame with Correspondent Dan Rather. Pinkston has filled in as anchor on the CBS Evening News-Weekend Edition, Up to the Minute and CBS Morning News.

== Early life and education ==
Born in Yazoo County, Mississippi, he attended Wesleyan University in Middletown, Connecticut, originally intending to pursue a career in law. However, after his father died, he moved back to Mississippi and earned a bachelor's degree in 1973 from Millsaps College in Jackson, Mississippi. He also earned a Juris Doctor degree from University of Connecticut Law School in 1980.

== Professional career ==
Pinkston began his career at WLBT-TV in Jackson, Mississippi, where he worked as an anchor and reported from 1971 until 1974. He then worked for WJXT-TV from 1974 until 1976, as urban affairs director, a general assignment reporter and the producer of a daily public affairs program. From 1976 until 1980, Pinkston worked for WFSB-TV in Hartford, where he served as a reporter, an anchor and the producer of several public affairs programs and specials.

From 1980 until 1990, Pinkston worked for WCBS-TV in New York, where he served as a reporter and as the station's New Jersey correspondent from 1989 until 1990.

In 1990, Pinkston joined CBS News as its White House correspondent. He spent two years covering President George H. W. Bush, including breaking the news in January 1992 of the president falling ill while dining with Japan's prime minister, Kiichi Miyazawa. From 1992 until 1994, Pinkston remained in CBS' Washington bureau.

In 1994, Pinkston was moved to CBS' New York bureau. He reported for the CBS Evening News and also for other CBS news broadcasts. He has covered the wars in Iraq and Afghanistan, as well as the U.S. intervention in Haiti, the Unabomber story, the standoff involving the Montana Freemen and the trial of Susan Smith.

In November 2000, Pinkston was a candidate for a job anchoring at WBBM-TV in Chicago. He taped an audition in November 2000 with longtime WBBM news anchor Linda MacLennan, according to an article in the November 15, 2000, edition of the Chicago Sun-Times. Ultimately, however, the station gave the job to insider David Kerley.

On May 19, 2013 it was announced that Pinkston was leaving CBS after 33 years with the company. In August 2013 he joined Al Jazeera America as a freelance journalist. On January 14, 2016, the Al Jazeera Media Network announced that it would be shutting down Al Jazeera America's cable TV and digital operations on April 30, 2016.

== Awards ==
Pinkston has won 4 national Emmy awards (1996, 1997, 1998), and one RTNDA Edward R. Murrow Award (1996), a Society of Professional Journalists Community Service Award (2009), and a Silver Em Award from the University of Mississippi Meek School of Journalism (2013).

== Personal ==
Pinkston and his wife, Patricia McLain, live in Teaneck, New Jersey, in Bergen County.
