= Andy Richardson (sports correspondent) =

Andy Richardson is a sports presenter and correspondent, currently working for Al Jazeera English.

Richardson has a wide range of experience as a sports journalist, and has previously worked with: Independent Television News (ITN), Sky News, ITV and Five News.

== Career ==
Al Jazeera English

Richardson is a regular presenter on the sports-desk of the flagship daily news-programme, Newshour. Previously, the Al Jazeera English sports coverage was packaged into a separate daily programme and Richardson was a regular on this strand, the now defunct: Sportsworld.

As well as his studio-based work, Richardson has reported for Al Jazeera from across the globe. His reports have ranged from coverage of the 2008 Olympics from Beijing to reporting on the world's northernmost marathon, at the North Pole.

Five News

As Five News's sports correspondent, Richardson covered many of the major events in world sport, including the 2002 Football World Cup in Japan, the 2003 Rugby World Cup in Australia and the 2004 European Football Championships in Portugal.

ITV News

Before that, Richardson was a sports producer and reporter for ITV News in London, filing and producing stories on domestic and international sporting events. His coverage included the 1999 Rugby World Cup and the 2000 European Football Championships.

== Personal ==
Richardson appreciates the value of sport and exercise in his own life and is known for being a keen long-distance runner.
