= Adam May (television reporter) =

American television news anchor and reporter

- Education: University of Minnesota (BA)
- Occupation: Journalist
- Title: Former anchor and reporter at WBAL-TV

Adam May is a former television news anchor and reporter, best known for his work on Al Jazeera America and with WJZ-TV and WBAL-TV in Baltimore. He was previously lead contributor to Al Jazeera America's flagship show, America Tonight. May was also previously an anchor and reporter at Baltimore's CBS-owned station, WJZ-TV.

== About ==
May attended the University of Minnesota. He started his career at KBJR in Duluth, Minnesota, before working at WHAS in Louisville, Kentucky, and WAAY in Huntsville, Alabama.

In 2003, he joined WJZ-TV in Baltimore. Adam May's investigative stories have covered issues including the energy crisis, port security, witness intimidation and prison staffing shortages. In 2006, the National Academy of Television Arts and Sciences named May "Best Live Reporter" for the Mid-Atlantic region. After 10 years with the station he left to pursue national broadcast news at Al Jazeera America's news show, America Tonight, as a national correspondent and backup anchor. In 2016, after Al Jazeera America disbanded, May briefly was a freelance correspondent for CBS Newspath in Washington, D.C., before returning to Baltimore, this time at WBAL-TV as a weekend anchor and weekday evening reporter.

May left WBAL-TV in 2018 for a corporate communications job for Renewal by Andersen in his native Minneapolis.

May is married to Derek Valcourt, a fellow broadcaster whom he met while both were working in Huntsville, Alabama. Valcourt followed May to WJZ-TV. May and Valcourt have a son.
