= Fault Lines (TV program) =

- Genre: Investigative
- Created by: Al Jazeera English

Production
- Running time: 25 minutes

Original release
- Release: November 2009

Fault Lines is an American current affairs and documentary television program broadcast on Al Jazeera English. Premiering in November 2009, the program is known for investigative storytelling examining the United States and its role in the world.

== Team ==
=== Correspondents as of 2011 ===
- Josh Rushing
- Sharif Kouddous
- Natasha del Toro
- Femi Oke

=== Former correspondents ===
- Sebastian Walker
- Anjali Kamat
- Zeina Awad
- Avi Lewis
- Teresa Bo
- Wab Kinew
- Nagieb Khaja

== Episodes ==
No.	Title	YouTube	Team	Awards	Original release date
1	"Obama's Policy on Torture"	Watch on YouTube	To be added	To be added	2009
As a candidate for president, Barack Obama promised a new direction. After taking office, he issued executive orders banning torture and closing CIA black sites. Fault Lines examines how much actually changed, speaking with human rights lawyers, former Bush officials, a former US detainee and the CIA analyst involved in his case, and asks whether the Obama administration truly broke with Bush-era abuses.
2	"Tale of Two Bankruptcies"	Watch on YouTube	To be added	To be added	2009
The episode contrasts the fate of one indebted family with that of banking giant Citigroup. Frank and Jeanne Bachard fall into deep credit-card debt after health problems push them out of work and discover that bankruptcy law reforms leave them “too poor to go bankrupt”. Meanwhile, Citigroup, crippled by toxic assets, survives through hundreds of billions of dollars in public support. The film explores anger over who is rescued and who is left to fail.
3	"Collapsing Auto Industry in Detroit"	Watch on YouTube	To be added	To be added	2009
As the US auto industry lurches toward collapse, Fault Lines visits Detroit, already suffering the country’s highest foreclosure and unemployment rates. With one in three auto jobs gone and Obama’s task force reshaping GM and Chrysler from Washington, Avi Lewis meets residents whose livelihoods depend on decisions being made far from their neighborhoods.
4	"Town Hall Debate on Torture"	Watch on YouTube	To be added	To be added	2009
In a special town hall episode, Josh Rushing moderates a live debate on torture with Lawrence Wilkerson, Michael Scheuer, Jumana Musa and Jim Moran. The panel discusses what it would take to dismantle the Bush administration’s torture architecture, whether officials will ever be held to account, and how the US should balance security and human rights going forward.
5	"California in Crisis"	Watch on YouTube	To be added	To be added	2009
Facing a $24 billion budget shortfall, California risks running out of cash to pay its bills. Governor Arnold Schwarzenegger proposes deep cuts to social programmes while the world watches the eighth-largest economy on earth struggle. Avi Lewis reports from South Central Los Angeles on the political causes and human consequences of the state’s austerity push.
6	"Evangelism in US Military"	Watch on YouTube	To be added	To be added	2009
The episode investigates the growing influence of evangelical Christianity within the US military. As the US fights wars in Muslim-majority countries, Fault Lines examines how internal religious tensions, policy decisions, and military culture shape the conduct and perception of these conflicts, including a sit-down interview with former National Security Advisor Brent Scowcroft.
7	"Newt Gingrich: Former Speaker of House of Representatives"	Watch on YouTube	To be added	To be added	2009
Avi Lewis sits down with Newt Gingrich, more than a decade after his tenure as speaker of the US House of Representatives. The conversation explores his role in reshaping Republican politics in the 1990s, his confrontational brand of conservatism, and whether he is positioning himself for another political revolution as the party seeks to recover from electoral defeat.
8	"US Admiral Michael Mullen"	Watch on YouTube	To be added	To be added	2009
In this interview episode, Fault Lines speaks with US Admiral Michael Mullen about the challenges facing the US military during ongoing conflicts abroad, including strategy, troop deployments and the strains of long-running wars on soldiers and policy-makers alike.
9	"Health Care Reform"	Watch on YouTube	To be added	To be added	2009
As Barack Obama embarks on the most contentious battle of his first year in office, Fault Lines examines the US health care system, where soaring costs coexist with tens of millions uninsured. The film follows the legislative fight in Washington and exposes how powerful industry lobbies work behind the scenes to shape reforms that protect their profits.
10	"Obama's Strategy in Afghanistan"	Watch on YouTube	To be added	To be added	2009
As president, Barack Obama argues that Afghanistan is the “good war” compared with Iraq. Josh Rushing embeds with US troops on the front lines to see how this strategy plays out on the ground, exploring the resilience of the Taliban, waning local support and whether the US has a realistic path to security or exit.
11	"Harry Belafonte: On Obama and politics of race"	Watch on YouTube	To be added	To be added	2009
With the election of the first Black US president, Avi Lewis speaks with musician and activist Harry Belafonte about Barack Obama, the politics of race in America and what real change would look like for communities that have long been marginalised.
12	"Mental Illness in America's Prisons"	Watch on YouTube	To be added	To be added	2009
Fault Lines investigates how jails and prisons in the United States have become de facto mental health institutions. Focusing on Houston, Texas, the episode follows police crisis intervention teams and examines how underfunded hospitals, shrinking long-term care and aggressive policing have left hundreds of thousands of people with mental illness cycling through the criminal justice system.
13	"The Best of Fault Lines 2009"	Watch on YouTube	To be added	To be added	2009
Nearly a year into Barack Obama’s presidency, this special episode revisits highlights from Fault Lines' reporting across the US, from devastated Detroit neighbourhoods to lines of uninsured Americans seeking basic care. It asks whether meaningful change has reached those most affected by economic crisis and political decisions.
14	"Honduras: 100 Days of Resistance"	Watch on YouTube	To be added	To be added	2009
More than 100 days after a coup removed President Manuel Zelaya from office, Fault Lines travels to Honduras to examine the deeper social and economic divides behind the crisis. The film looks at the power of the country’s elite families, the role of regional politics and Hugo Chávez, and the mobilisation of social movements demanding a more equal refounding of the nation.
15	"US Ambassador to Iraq: Christopher Hill"	Watch on YouTube	To be added	To be added	2009
With global attention shifting to Afghanistan, Fault Lines interviews Christopher Hill, the US ambassador to Iraq, about continuing violence, upcoming elections and the timetable for US troop withdrawal. Josh Rushing presses him on US policy, regional influence and whether the US is prepared to confront the human costs of the war.
16	"Afghanistan & the United States: The Deeper Debate"	Watch on YouTube	To be added	To be added	2009
In a town hall–style discussion, Fault Lines brings together a panel of guests and a live audience to debate US strategy in Afghanistan. The episode revisits Barack Obama’s campaign promises, the troop surge and the growing insurgency, asking what the endgame might look like and how long the war can be sustained.
17	"Race and the Recession Town Hall"	Watch on YouTube	To be added	To be added	2009
From Washington, DC, Avi Lewis moderates a town hall exploring how the US recession has affected minority communities. The discussion examines structural racism, unemployment, foreclosure and whether President Obama’s policies are adequately addressing the disproportionate impact of the crisis.
18	"US Colombia Base Agreement"	Watch on YouTube	To be added	To be added	2009
After the US signs a deal granting access to seven Colombian military bases, Fault Lines travels to Colombia to investigate why the agreement has provoked alarm among South American governments. The episode situates the pact in the context of Plan Colombia, regional fears of US intervention and escalating tensions with neighbouring Venezuela.
19	"Rio: Olympic City"	Watch on YouTube	To be added	To be added	January 13, 2010
After Rio de Janeiro wins its bid to host the 2016 Olympic Games, celebrations are quickly followed by violence as a police helicopter is shot down by drug traffickers. The episode explores how the government’s intensified crackdown on favelas exposes deep social and economic divides beneath the Olympic dream.
20	"Obama: Year One"	Watch on YouTube	To be added	To be added	January 20, 2010
Avi Lewis looks back at Barack Obama’s first year in office, testing his campaign promises against his record on Wall Street bailouts, the escalation of the Afghan war and the battle over health care. Through interviews with operatives from both parties, media figures and voters, the film paints a portrait of a fractured US still propelled by hope.
21	"Haiti: The Politics of Rebuilding"	To be added	To be added	To be added	February 11, 2010
Weeks after the earthquake that killed more than 200,000 people in Haiti, Avi Lewis travels from Port-au-Prince to the Plateau Central. Amid tent cities, food distribution points and temporary government offices, the film follows emerging debates over billions in promised aid and what kind of country will be rebuilt in the disaster’s wake.
22	"On the Brink: Iraq, Kurdistan and the Battle for Kirkuk"	Watch on YouTube	To be added	To be added	February 25, 2010
Josh Rushing reports from northern Iraq, where Kurds and Arabs stand off over land, oil and political power. Centered on Kirkuk, a city that may hold a quarter of Iraq’s oil reserves, the episode asks whether disputes over control of the region could fracture the Iraqi state or even ignite a new civil war.
23	"Cornel West"	Watch on YouTube	To be added	To be added	March 11, 2010
In an in-depth conversation, Avi Lewis interviews Cornel West, professor of African American Studies at Princeton, public intellectual and activist. West reflects on the state of democracy for Black Americans, the Obama administration, the global recession, US foreign policy and the pressures facing the president from both left and right.
24	"America's Jobs Crisis"	Watch on YouTube	To be added	To be added	April 8, 2010
As tens of millions of Americans face unemployment or struggle on minimum wage, Fault Lines travels to some of the communities hardest hit by the recession. The film follows local efforts to confront what some call a “social state of emergency” and explores bottom-up solutions to the jobs crisis.
25	"Cyberwar"	Watch on YouTube	To be added	To be added	April 22, 2010
Josh Rushing enters the world of digital conflict, where hackers, cyberarmies and state-backed operators wage battles in cyberspace. Speaking to security officials, industry insiders, hackers and critics, the episode asks whether the US is fuelling a cyber arms race and how “securitisation” of the internet is reshaping privacy and free expression.
26	"Arundhati Roy"	Watch on YouTube	To be added	To be added	May 6, 2010
Avi Lewis sits down with writer and activist Arundhati Roy, whose Booker Prize–winning novel The God of Small Things gave way to a career of fierce political critique. Roy discusses mega-dam projects, corporate control of land, Hindu nationalism, the “war on terror,” and her journey into India’s Maoist insurgency.
27	"The Other Debt Crisis: Climate Debt in Bolivia"	Watch on YouTube	To be added	To be added	May 20, 2010
In Bolivia, the climate emergency is already reshaping daily life, from melting tropical glaciers to chaotic droughts and floods. Avi Lewis follows the country’s push to put “climate debt” on the global agenda, arguing that wealthy nations owe reparations to those who did least to cause the crisis but suffer its harshest impacts.
28	"Dying Inside: Elderly in Prison"	Watch on YouTube	To be added	To be added	June 7, 2010
With long sentences and tough-on-crime policies, US prisons now house a rapidly growing elderly population. Josh Rushing gains rare access to jails and prisons to see how institutions are coping with aging prisoners whose medical costs can be three times higher than those of younger inmates.
29	"In Deep Water – A Way of Life in Peril"	Watch on YouTube	To be added	To be added	June 17, 2010
Two months after the Deepwater Horizon explosion, millions of litres of oil continue to spill into the Gulf of Mexico. Avi Lewis travels to the drill zone and Louisiana’s wetlands to document environmental damage, health problems blamed on the petrochemical industry and the threat the disaster poses to local communities’ way of life.
30	"Danny Glover"	Watch on YouTube	To be added	To be added	July 1, 2010
In this special edition, Fault Lines profiles actor, director and producer Danny Glover. The episode traces his journey from campus activism at San Francisco State University to decades of work on labour rights, HIV/AIDS awareness and struggles for peace and justice, exploring how art and politics intersect in his life.
31	"Haiti: Six Months On"	Watch on YouTube	To be added	Haiti: Six Months On was awarded the Alfred I. duPont–Columbia University Award in 2012.	July 13, 2010
Six months after the earthquake that killed up to 300,000 people, more than a million Haitians remain displaced in tent camps, rubble still lines the streets, and reconstruction has barely begun. Fault Lines examines the widening gap between Haiti’s poor majority and the foreign aid agencies now shaping the country’s future, and asks who is truly positioned to govern Haiti.
32	"General Wesley Clark"	Watch on YouTube	To be added	To be added	July 29, 2010
Josh Rushing sits down with retired NATO Supreme Allied Commander General Wesley Clark to discuss Iraq, Afghanistan, US energy dependence, and the broader strategic challenges shaping American foreign policy.
33	"Illegal America: Arizona's Immigration Fight"	Watch on YouTube	To be added	To be added	August 26, 2010
Arizona’s controversial SB1070 law reignites the national immigration debate. Supporters say the state had to act where Washington failed; opponents call it discriminatory and unconstitutional. Fault Lines travels to Arizona to examine the politics, legal battles, and human consequences behind the law.
34	"Politics of Death Row"	Watch on YouTube	To be added	To be added	September 9, 2010
Fault Lines gains rare access to Oklahoma’s death row and explores why capital punishment is concentrated in a handful of southern states. With more than 130 exonerations since 1973, the program investigates shifting public attitudes, political pressures, and the growing unease about the risk of wrongful executions.
35	"The High and the Mighty"	Watch on YouTube	To be added	To be added	October 7, 2010
As California considers full cannabis legalization in 2010, Fault Lines investigates what the measure could mean for the state’s economy, the criminal justice system, and Mexico’s deadly drug war. Josh Rushing explores the politics behind the ballot and the future of US drug policy.
36	"Tea Party, Big Money, Twisted Maps"	Watch on YouTube	To be added	To be added	October 21, 2010
In the lead-up to the 2010 midterms, Fault Lines examines the rise of the Tea Party, the surge of undisclosed campaign spending following a landmark Supreme Court ruling, and the partisan battle over redistricting that could shape political power for a decade.
37	"US Midterm Elections: A Town Hall Debate"	Watch on YouTube	To be added	To be added	November 4, 2010
The morning after the 2010 midterm elections, Avi Lewis hosts a town hall with activists, strategists, and policy experts to analyze the results, the Republican resurgence, and what the political realignment means for the next two years.
38	"Fast Food, Fat Profits: Obesity in America"	Watch on YouTube	To be added	To be added	November 19, 2010
With two-thirds of Americans overweight and obesity rates soaring, Fault Lines explores how food deserts, processed school meals, and corporate profit structures shape public health. Josh Rushing meets communities fighting for access to healthy food as the crisis deepens.
39	"Canada–Israel: The Other Special Relationship"	Watch on YouTube	To be added	To be added	December 2, 2010
Once viewed as a neutral mediator, Canada has become one of Israel’s strongest diplomatic allies. Avi Lewis investigates the political, ideological, and foreign-policy currents driving this transformation.
40	"Mexico: Impunity and Profits"	Watch on YouTube	To be added	To be added	June 11, 2011
Once a symbol of Mexico’s industrial growth, Ciudad Juárez has become the world’s murder capital. Josh Rushing travels to the border city to investigate cartel violence, militarization, and the economic and political forces that have made life so cheap and trafficking so lucrative.
41	"Mexico's Hidden War"	Watch on YouTube	To be added	To be added	June 19, 2011
In the second of a two-part series on Mexico, Josh Rushing travels to Guerrero, one of the country’s poorest and top drug-producing states. Fault Lines investigates claims that Mexican security forces are using the drug war as a pretext to repress indigenous and campesino communities who are resisting dispossession.
42	"Puerto Rico: The Fiscal Experiment"	Watch on YouTube	To be added	To be added	June 27, 2011
Fault Lines travels to Puerto Rico as the government imposes austerity measures, including mass layoffs and tuition hikes, to close a multibillion-dollar budget gap. The episode follows students and unions resisting these policies and examines the island’s recession, debt crisis and colonial relationship with the United States.
43	"Colombia's Gold Rush"	Watch on YouTube	To be added	To be added	July 4, 2011
As gold prices soar, Colombia’s new rush for the metal becomes entangled with its long-running armed conflict. Fault Lines reports on clashes between paramilitaries, guerrilla groups, the army and rural mining communities, and looks at how multinational companies and small-scale miners are competing over contested, often indigenous, land.
44	"Outsourced: Clinical Trials Overseas"	Watch on YouTube	To be added	To be added	July 20, 2011
As US pharmaceutical companies increasingly move clinical trials abroad, Fault Lines looks at how drug testing is conducted on poor populations in countries such as India. The film raises questions about oversight, informed consent and who bears the risks in the global search for new medicines.
45	"The US and the New Middle East: Libya"	Watch on YouTube	To be added	To be added	July 19, 2011
This episode examines the US and NATO intervention in Libya during the 2011 uprising, exploring Washington’s goals, its alliances on the ground, and the consequences for Libyans caught between Muammar Gaddafi’s forces and foreign-backed rebels.
46	"The US and the New Middle East: The Gulf"	Watch on YouTube	To be added	To be added	July 26, 2011
Fault Lines looks at US relationships with Gulf Arab monarchies in the wake of the Arab uprisings, asking how American security interests, energy dependence and arms sales shape politics and repression in the region.
47	"The Top 1%"	Watch online	To be added	To be added	October 12, 2011
With 1 per cent of Americans controlling an estimated 40 per cent of the country’s wealth, Fault Lines investigates the widening gap between the super-rich and everyone else, tracing how inequality has deepened over the past three decades.
48	"Horn of Africa Crisis: Somalia's Famine"	Watch on YouTube	To be added	To be added	November 29, 2011
Amid the worst drought in decades and a famine that kills tens of thousands, Fault Lines travels to Mogadishu to meet Somalis fleeing hunger and conflict, and the aid workers trying to help them. The episode examines how counterterrorism policies, armed groups and geopolitics have shaped the crisis.
49	"Horn of Africa Crisis: Drought Zone"	Watch on YouTube	To be added	To be added	December 6, 2011
As global leaders debate climate policy in Durban, Fault Lines travels through Kenya’s drought-stricken regions to see how US policies, development models and security priorities intersect with hunger and environmental stress in the Horn of Africa.
50	"Politics, Religion and the Tea Party"	Watch on YouTube	To be added	To be added	December 13, 2011
Following the 2010 midterms and heading into the 2012 race, Fault Lines explores the links between the Tea Party, Christian conservative networks and Republican politics. On the Iowa campaign trail, the film asks how religion and right-wing grassroots activism are reshaping the US political landscape.
51	"The Decline of Labour Unions in the US"	Watch on YouTube	To be added	To be added	December 19, 2011
Fault Lines charts the long decline of organised labour in the US and the 2011 backlash as Republican governors move to weaken public-sector unions. From protests in Wisconsin and Ohio to the rise of Occupy Wall Street, the episode asks whether unions can reinvent themselves as a major political force.
52	"Robot Wars"	Watch on YouTube	To be added	To be added	December 26, 2011
With thousands of drones and ground robots now deployed by the US military, Fault Lines investigates how unmanned systems are changing warfare. The film looks at lethal drone strikes, evolving rules of engagement and the legal and ethical questions raised as more autonomy is built into machines.

== Awards ==
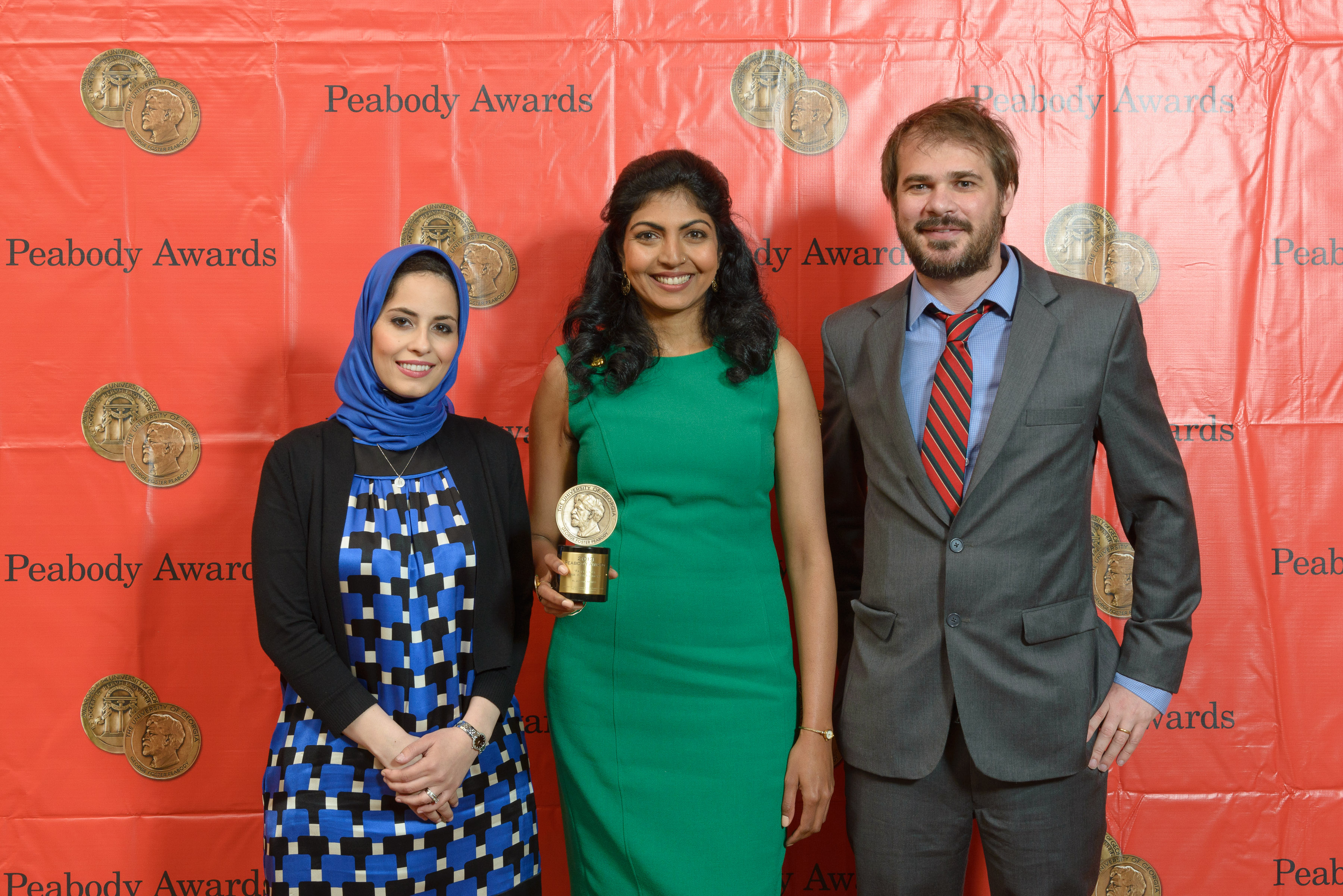
The crew of "Made in Bangladesh" at the 73rd Annual Peabody Awards

Year	Title	Awarding Body	Award	Recognition	Ref
2011	Haiti - Six Months On	Columbia University Graduate School of Journalism	Alfred I. duPont-Columbia University Award	Excellence in Broadcast and Digital News	
2014	Haiti in a time of Cholera	National Academy of Television Arts and Sciences	News & Documentary Emmy Award	Outstanding Investigative Journalism in a News Magazine	
2014	Haiti in a time of Cholera	Henry W. Grady College of Journalism and Mass Communication	Peabody Awards		
2014	Made in Bangladesh	Henry W. Grady College of Journalism and Mass Communication	Peabody Awards		
2014	Made in Bangladesh	Robert F. Kennedy Human Rights	Robert F. Kennedy Journalism Award	International TV	
2014	Made in Bangladesh	Press Club of Atlantic City	National Headliner Awards, first place	Instigative report	
2014	Deadly Force	Press Club of Atlantic City	National Headliner Awards, first place	Instigative report	
2014	Water for Coal	Press Club of Atlantic City	National Headliner Awards, first place	Environmental	
2014	America's Infant Mortality Crisis	Press Club of Atlantic City	National Headliner Awards, first place	Health/science reporting, first place	
2015	Ferguson: City Under Siege	National Association of Black Journalists		Television: Documentary, winner	
2015	Ferguson: City Under Siege	ATAS, NATAS, and IATAS	Emmy Award	Coverage of Breaking news in News Magazine, nominee	
2015	American War Workers	ATAS, NATAS, and IATAS	Emmy Award	Investigative Journalism in a News Magazine, nominee	
2015	American War Workers	Overseas Press Club of America	Joe & Laurie Dine Award	Best international reporting in any medium dealing with human rights	
2015	Mexico's Vigilante State	Overseas Press Club of America	Robert Spiers Benjamin Award	Best reporting in any medium on Latin America	
2015	Ferguson: Race and Justice in the US	Radio Television Digital News Association	Kaleidoscope Award		
2015	Opioid Wars	National Institute for Health Care Management	Television & Radio Journalism Award, tied first place		
2016	Baltimore Rising	National Association for Multi-Ethnicity in Communications	Vision Award, Documentary		
2016	Baltimore Rising	ATAS, NATAS, IATAS	Emmy Award	Outstanding Coverage of a Breaking News Story in a News Magazine, nominee	
2016	Forgotten Youth: Inside America's Prisons	ATAS, NATAS, IATAS	Emmy Award	Outstanding Investigative Journalism in a News Magazine, nominee	
2016	Forgotten Youth: Inside America's Prisons	ATAS, NATAS, IATAS	Emmy Award	Outstanding Research, nominee	
2016	Conflicted: The Fight for Congo's Minerals	ATAS, NATAS, IATAS	Emmy Award	Outstanding Business and Economic Reporting in a News Magazine, nominee	
2016	The Puerto Rico Gamble	ATAS, NATAS, IATAS	Emmy Award	Outstanding Business and Economic Reporting in a News Magazine, nominee	
2016	Death of Aging	New York International Film and TV Festival	Gold World Medal, Science & Technology		
2017	Standing Rock and the Battle Beyond	ATAS, NATAS, IATAS	Emmy Award	Outstanding Science, Medical and Environmental Report, nominee	
2017	The Anacortes Disaster	ATAS, NATAS, IATAS	Emmy Award	Outstanding Business, Consumer and Economic Report, nominee	
2017	The Anacortes Disaster	Society of Environmental Journalists	Society of Environmental Journalists Award	Outstanding Explanatory Reporting, first place	
2017	Left Behind	New York International Film and TV Festival	Gold World Award		
2017	The Dark Prison	New York International Film and TV Festival	Gold World Award		
2018	Haiti By Force	CINE	Golden Eagle Award	Short documentary	
2018	The Ban	39th Annual News & Documentary Emmy® Awards	Emmy Award	Outstanding Continuing Coverage of a News Story in a Newsmagazine	
2019	No Shelter: Family Separation at the Border.	Overseas Press Club of America	Edward R. Murrow award	Best TV, video, or documentary interpretation of international affairs	
2019	Adoption Inc.	40th Annual News & Documentary Emmy® Awards	Emmy Award	Outstanding Investigative Report in a Newsmagazine	
2022	When the Water Stopped	Society of Environmental Journalists	SEJ Award	Outstanding Feature Story, Large Category. First place.	
2022	Unrelinquished: When Abusers Keep Their Guns	Robert F. Kennedy Human Rights	Robert F. Kennedy Journalism Award	Domestic Television Award	
2023	The Killing of Shireen Abu Akleh	Long Island University	George Polk Award	Foreign Television Reporting	
2023	No Country for Haitians	Overseas Press Club of America	The Edward R. Murrow Award	Best TV, video, or documentary interpretation of international affairs	
2023	Blood Sport	Association of International Broadcasting	The AIB	Sports Journalism	
2024	The Shark Fin Hunters	45th Annual News & Documentary Emmy® Awards	Emmy Award	Outstanding Climate, Environment and Weather Coverage	
