= 47th News and Documentary Emmy Awards =

- Date: May 27, 2026 (News); May 28, 2026 (Documentary)
- Location: Jazz at Lincoln Center's Frederick P. Rose Hall, New York City
- Presented by: Amber Ruffin (News); Michael Ian Black (Documentary)
- Most awards: Trafficked with Mariana van Zeller (7)
- Most nominations: Trafficked with Mariana van Zeller (25)

Television/radio coverage
- Network: YouTube

The 47th News and Documentary Emmy Awards, presented by the National Academy of Television Arts and Sciences, honored the best in American news and documentary programming in 2025. The award ceremonies took place on May 27 and 28, 2026, at Jazz at Lincoln Center's Frederick P. Rose Hall in New York City. As per usual, the winners of the news categories were revealed on the first night, and the winners of the documentary categories were announced on the second night. The ceremonies were live-streamed at NATAS YouTube channel. American comedian Amber Ruffin hosted the news ceremony while American comedian Michael Ian Black hosted the documentary one.

The nominees were announced on April 7, 2026. National Geographic's investigative series Trafficked with Mariana van Zeller led the nominations with 25. American reporter Martha Raddatz and American film director Sam Pollard (Eyes on the Prize) received the Lifetime Achievement awards for their contributions to news programming and documentary filmmaking, respectively.

== Winners and nominees ==
The nominees were announced on April 7, 2026. The winners were revealed on May 27 and 28, 2026.

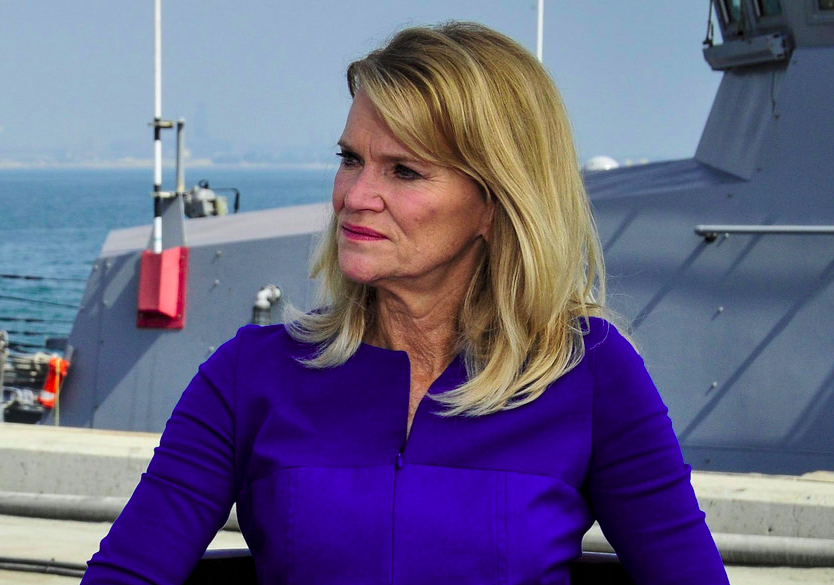
Martha Raddatz, Lifetime Achievement Award recipient

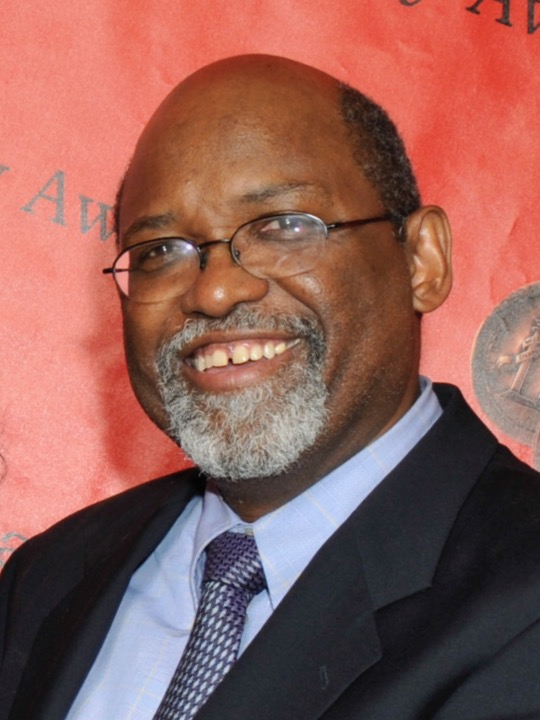
Sam Pollard, Lifetime Achievement Award recipient

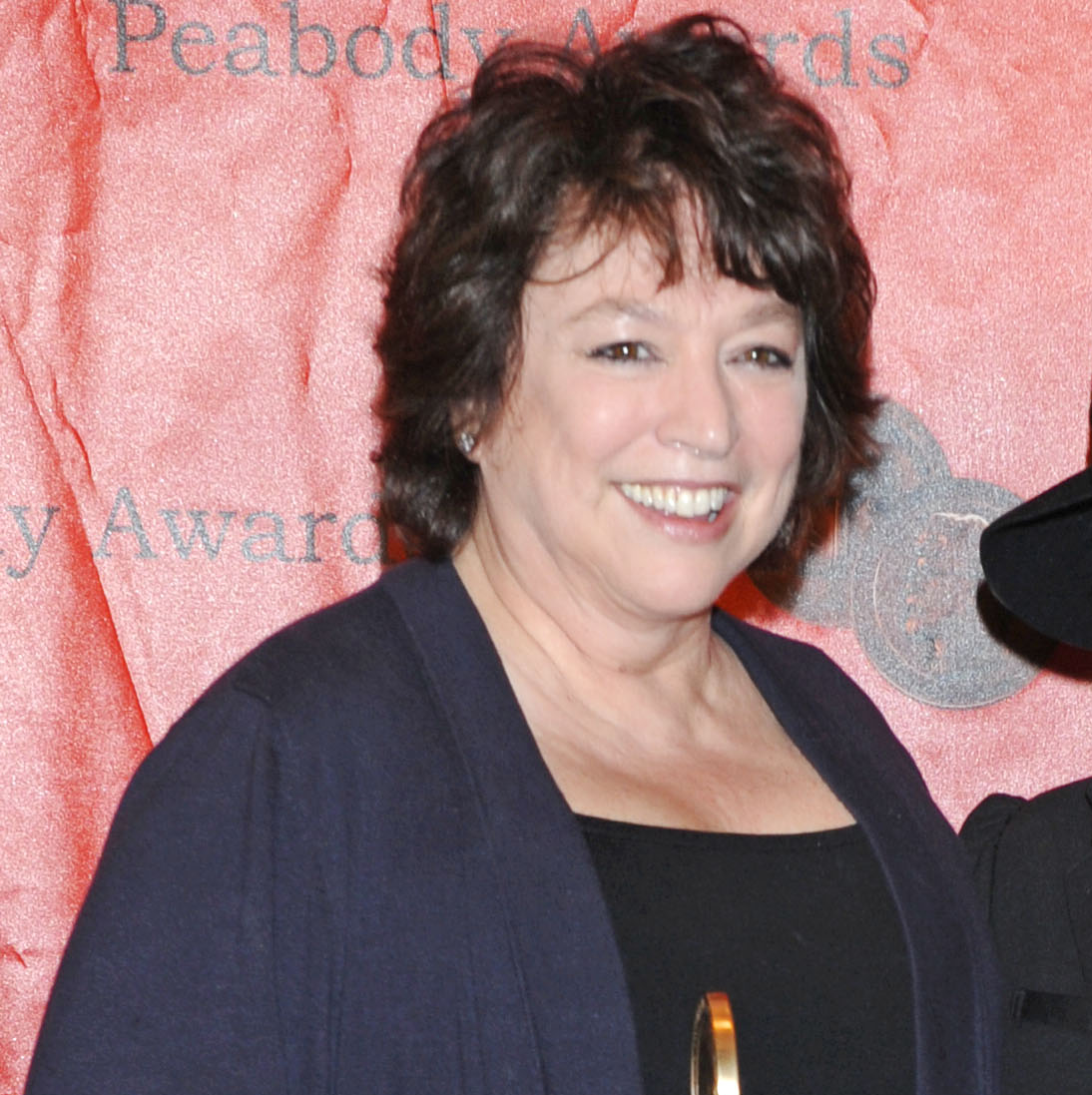
Susan Lacy, Golden Circle Inductee

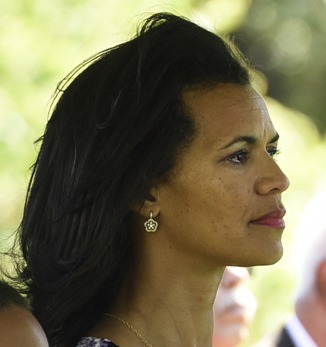
Fredricka Whitfield, Silver Circle Inductee

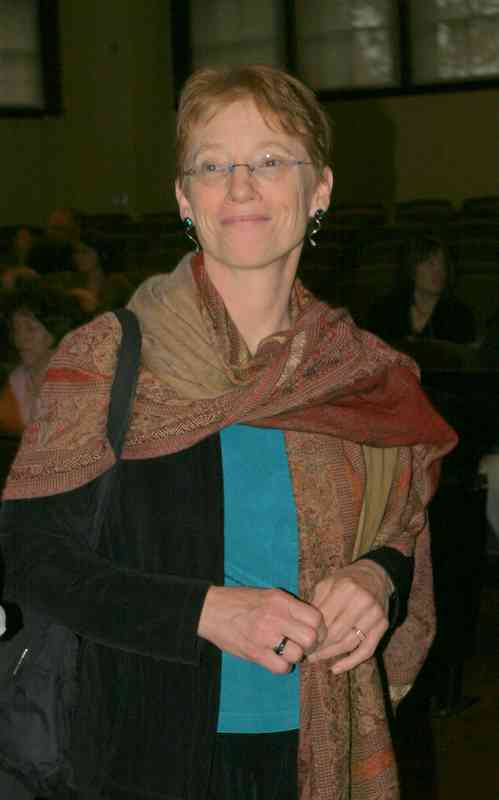
Patricia Aufderheide, Silver Circle Inductee

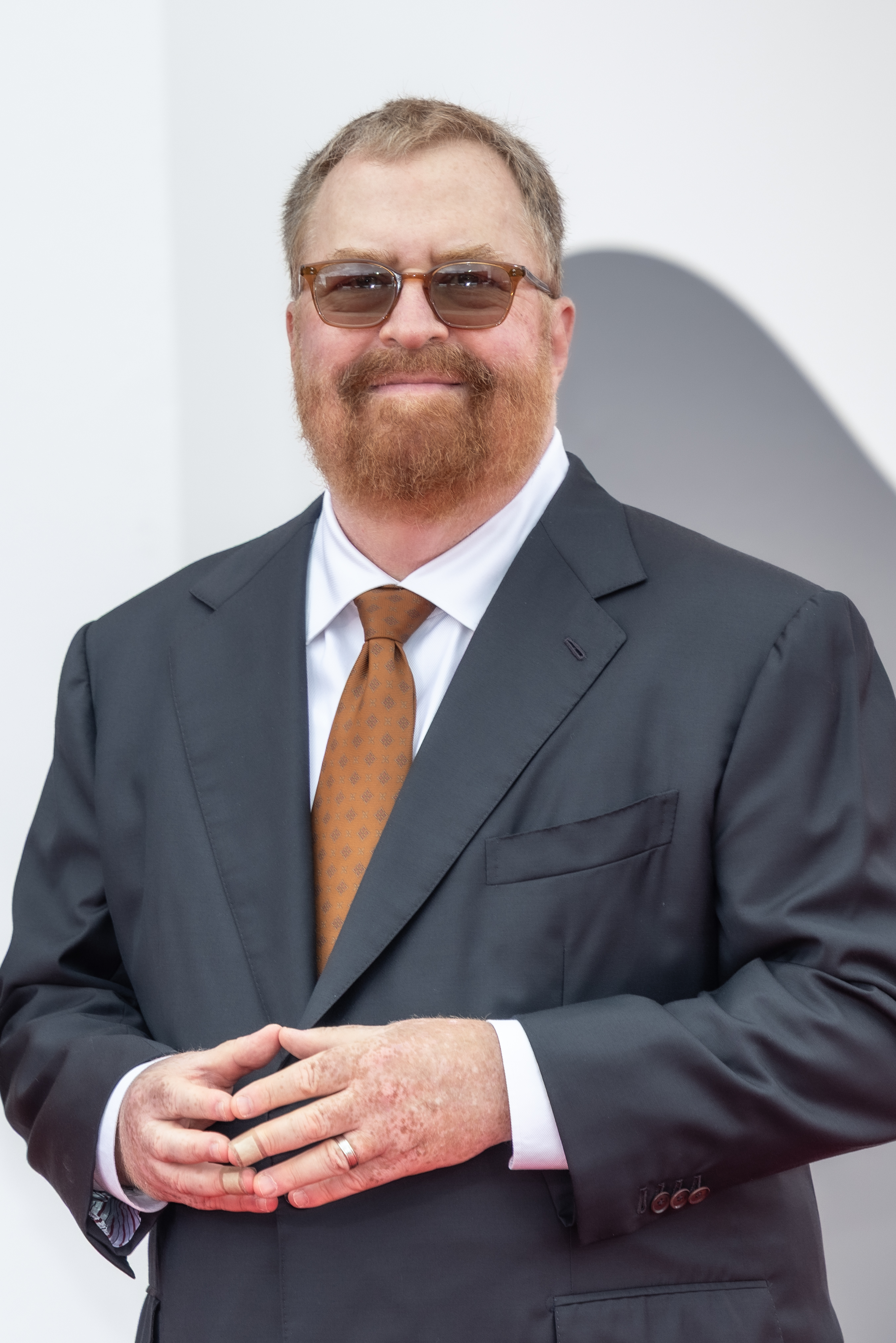
R. J. Cutler, Silver Circle Inductee

=== Lifetime Achievement Award ===
- Martha Raddatz (Reporter and Chief Global Affairs correspondent, ABC News – news)
- Sam Pollard (Film director, editor, producer and screenwriter – documentary)

=== Gold Circle Inductees ===
- Mary Laurence Flynn – Senior producer, NBC News (news)
- Fountain Jones – Senior technical director, vision mixer, audio engineer, CBS (news)
- Jim Murphy – Former senior vice president, CNN (news)
- David Sloan – Senior executive producer, ABC News (news)
- Kerry Smith – Senior vice president, ABC News (news)
- Mary Walsh – Producer, CBS (news)
- Susan Lacy – Documentary film director and producer; Creator and executive producer of PBS American Masters (documentary)

=== Silver Circle Inductees ===
- Fredricka Whitfield – News anchor and journalist, CNN (news)
- Patricia Aufderheide – University professor, School of Communication, American University, Washington, D.C. (documentary)
- R. J. Cutler – Filmmaker; President and founder of This Machine Filmworks (documentary)
- Sally Jo Fifer – Former president and CEO at Independent Television Service (ITVS) (documentary)
- Vicente Franco Izquierdo – Cinematographer and director, Franco Productions (documentary)
- Renee Tajima-Peña – Documentary filmmaker and professor at the University of California, Los Angeles (documentary)

=== News Programming ===
Outstanding Live News Program	Outstanding Recorded News Program
ABC World News Tonight with David Muir (ABC News); Anderson Cooper 360 (CNN Worldwide); Good Morning America (ABC News); The Lead with Jake Tapper (CNN); NBC Nightly News with Tom Llamas (NBC News); Today Show (NBC News)	The Whole Story with Anderson Cooper (CNN Worldwide); ABC News Nightline (ABC News); CBS News Sunday Morning (CBS News); Trafficked with Mariana van Zeller (National Geographic)
Outstanding Live Breaking News Coverage	Outstanding Extended Breaking News Coverage
ABC News Special Report: "U.S. Army's Grand Military Parade" (ABC News); Today Show: "American Eagle Helicopter Crash Morning After" (NBC News); CBS News: "Charlie Kirk Assassination" (CBS News); NBC News Special Report: "Gaza Peace Deal & Israeli Hostage Release" (NBC News); NBC News Special Report: "New Orleans Terror Attack" (NBC News)	60 Minutes: "The Fires" (CBS News); PBS News Hour: "Catastrophic Fires" (PBS News); "Deadly Texas Flash Floods" (CNN Worldwide); ABC World News Tonight with David Muir: "Fire Emergency in Southern California" (ABC News); "LA Wildfires" (CNN Worldwide)
Outstanding Live News Special	Outstanding Recorded News Special
20/20 & ABC World News Tonight with David Muir: "American Catastrophe: LA Burning" (ABC News); Noticias Telemundo: "100 días de Trump" (Telemundo); "100 Days of Trump: A Townhall with Forced Out Federal Workers" (MSNBC); ABC News Special Report: "The Conclave" (ABC News); Good Night, and Good Luck (CNN Worldwide)	ABC News Live: "The Children of Gaza" (ABC News); ABC News Live: "The Struggle for Food Assistance" (ABC News); "Hurricane Katrina: 20 Years After the Storm" (ABC News); The Whole Story with Anderson Cooper: "LA Burning" (CNN Worldwide); The Whole Story with Anderson Cooper: "The United States vs. Harvard" (CNN Worldwide)
Outstanding Continuing News Coverage: Short Form	Outstanding Continuing News Coverage: Long Form
"Earthquake in Myanmar" (BBC News); "CNN's Frederik Pleitgen Reports from Inside Iran" (CNN Worldwide); "CNN's Jeremy Diamond Covers Gaza's Starvation Crisis" (CNN Worldwide); PBS News Hour: "Cuts & Consequences" (PBS News); In the Shadows with Jason Bellini: "Haiti: Inside the Collapse" (Scripps News)	"Along the Green Line" (The Guardian); "CNN's Isobel Yeung Reports from Afghanistan" (CNN Worldwide); 60 Minutes: "The First 100 Days Compilation" (CBS News); "Gaza War" (The New York Times); "Immigration Crackdown" (ABC News)
Outstanding Light Feature Story: Short Form	Outstanding Light Feature Story: Long Form
"What Japan's Atom Bomb Survivors Have Taught Us" (Retro Report); "How Activists Fought for Rights for People with Disabilities" (Retro Report); ABC News Live Prime with Linsey Davis: "The Long Train Ride Home: Remembering Emmett Till" (ABC News); ABC News Live Prime with Linsey Davis: "Revisiting the Voting Rights Act" (ABC News); ABC News Nightline: "Remembering Captain Pitts" (ABC News); The New York Times Op-Docs: "View from the Floor" (The New York Times)	20/20 & ABC News Live: "Operation Babylift: The 50 Year Journey" (ABC News); ABC News Live: "America's Care Crisis" (ABC News); "I Took Bernie Into Deep Trump Country. Can He Win Them Over?" (More Perfect Union); 60 Minutes: "The Sherpas of Everest" (CBS News); The Whole Story with Anderson Cooper: "The Simril(l)s: A Family in Black and White" (CNN Worldwide)
Outstanding Hard News Feature Story: Short Form	Outstanding Hard News Feature Story: Long Form
60 Minutes: "The War in Gaza" (CBS News); ABC World News Tonight with David Muir: "California Burning" (ABC News); ABC World News Tonight with David Muir: "The Scope of the Devastation" (ABC News); ABC News Nightline: "Pregnant and Brain Dead" (ABC News); "Tortured for Ransom in the Sahara" (CNN Worldwide); ABC News Live Prime with Linsey Davis: "Two Nights with the Cartel" (ABC News)	"Chasing a Ghost: The Search for Austin Tice" (CNN Worldwide); Frontline: "Battle for Tibet" (PBS); Frontline: "The Rise of Germany's New Right" (PBS); The Whole Story with Anderson Cooper: "The Hidden Homeless" (CNN Worldwide); Trafficked with Mariana van Zeller: "Million Dollar Highway Heists" (National Geographic)
Outstanding Investigative News Coverage: Short Form	Outstanding Investigative News Coverage: Long Form
"DOGE Package" (The New York Times); CNN Investigates: "Death and Hunger: The Fate of Gaza's Aid Seekers" (CNN Worldwide); CNN Investigates: "ICE Operation Series" (CNN Worldwide); "Investigation: How the Tate Brothers Were Freed from Romania" (The New York Times); "Poisoned: Fentanyl's Child Victims" (Scripps News); Hallie Jackson Now: "Prison System in Crisis" (NBC News)	Frontline: "Strike on Iran: The Nuclear Question" (PBS); Trafficked with Mariana van Zeller: "Brides for Sale" (National Geographic); 60 Minutes: "The President's Pardon" (CBS News); 60 Minutes: "The Prisoners" (CBS News); "We Had 400 People Shop For Groceries. What We Found Will Shock You." (More Perfect Union)
Outstanding News Discussion & Analysis	Outstanding Emerging Journalist
"Deport Them All: Who's to Blame for Springfield's Immigrant Crisis?" (More Perfect Union); The Rachel Maddow Show: "Burn Order Community Event" (MS Now); NewsNight with Abby Phillip: "The History of Slavery: A Debate & Rebuttal" (CNN Worldwide); The New York Times Opinion: "They Were the Watchdogs" (The New York Times); The New York Times Opinion: "We Followed the Rules. ICE Jailed Us Anyway." (The New York Times); Breaking the Deadlock: "Truth Under Fire" (PBS); Washington Week: "Washington Week with The Atlantic" (PBS News)	Hanako Montgomery (CNN Worldwide); Camilo Montoya Galvez (CBS News); Jay O'Brien (ABC News); Kait eTutrone (The Weather Channel)
Outstanding Interview: Short Form	Outstanding Interview: Long Form
"CNN's Jeremy Diamond Presses Hamas Official on Suffering in Gaza" (CNN Worldwide); CBS News Sunday Morning: "Elon Musk" (CBS News); "Interview with Iran's Foreign Minister Araghchi" (NBC News); Meet the Press: "Interview with Russian Foreign Minister Sergey Lavrov" (NBC News); Good Morning America: "Pennsylvania Governor Speaks Out After Arson Attack" (ABC News); Nightline: "So I Rape You" (ABC News)	"Eric Dane Speaks" (ABC News); ABC News Live: "Epstein Survivors Speak Out" (ABC News); ABC News Live & This Week with George Stephanopoulos: "War or Peace: The Zelenskyy Interview" (ABC News); Leaders with Francine Lacqua: "Finland's President on Trump, Resilience and Putin's Threat" (Bloomberg Originals); Dateline NBC: "Lori Vallow Daybell: The Jailhouse Interview" (NBC News); "Why Young Men Don't Like the Democrats" (More Perfect Union)
Outstanding War or Violent Conflict Coverage	Outstanding Science and Technology Coverage
Fault Lines: "Kids Under Fire" (Al Jazeera International USA); Fault Lines: "The Disappearance of Dr. Abu Safiya" (Al Jazeera International USA); Fault Lines: "The Killing Field" (Al Jazeera International USA); Frontline: "Syria After Assad" (PBS); "Filmed in Gaza" (NBC News)	Trafficked with Mariana van Zeller: "Scam City" (National Geographic); "AI Chatbots Sent Him Spiraling. Then He Contacted Me." (More Perfect Union); 60 Minutes: "Character AI" (CBS News); The Circuit with Emily Chang: "Inside OpenAI's Stargate Megafactory with Sam Altman" (Bloomberg Originals); In the Shadows with Jason Bellini: "Robot War" (Scripps News); The Whole Story with Anderson Cooper: "The Wired Rainforest" (CNN Worldwide)
Outstanding Climate, Environment and Weather Coverage	Outstanding Health or Medical Coverage
Trafficked with Mariana van Zeller: "Shark Hunters" (National Geographic); Frontline: "Alaska's Vanishing Native Villages" (PBS); Frontline: "Hurricane Helene's Deadly Warning" (PBS); The New York Times Op-Docs: "Crying Glacier" (The New York Times); ABC News Live: "Last Lands" (ABC News); "We Went to the Town Elon Musk is Poisoning" (More Perfect Union)	Trafficked with Mariana van Zeller: "The Tranq Dope Underground" (National Geographic); In the Shadows with Jason Bellini: "Drone War Medics" (Scripps News); CNN Health: "Dr. Sanjay Gupta Reports: Pain: It Doesn't Have to Hurt" (CNN Worldwide); Fault Lines: "The Last Lifeline" (Al Jazeera International USA); IMPACT x Nightline: "Switched Before Birth" (ABC News / Hulu)
Outstanding Arts, Culture or Entertainment Coverage	Outstanding Business, Consumer or Economic Coverage
Trafficked with Mariana van Zeller: "Underground Street Racing" (National Geographic); "Born to Be Viral: The Real Lives of Kidfluencers" (ABC News); The Whole Story with Anderson Cooper: "K-Pop: A Star is Made" (CNN Worldwide); The Whole Story with Anderson Cooper: "No Laughing Matter: Free Speech Under Attack" (CNN Worldwide); IMPACT x Nightline: "Selena: Beyond the Headlines" (ABC News / Hulu); So Expensive: "Why Concert Tickets Are So Expensive - and Who's to Blame" (Business Insider)	"The Zombie Debts Making Wall Street Rich" (Bloomberg Investigates); View from Above: "Exposing the Dark Side of America's AI Data Center Explosion" (Business Insider); The New York Times Opinion: "Goodbye, Price Tags. Hello, Dynamic Pricing." (The New York Times); Trafficked with Mariana van Zeller: "The Great American Rehab Scam" (National Geographic); Fault Lines: "Gutted" (Al Jazeera International USA); CBS Reports: "The Price of Milk: Immigrants Behind American Dairy" (CBS News)
Outstanding Social Issue Coverage	Outstanding True Crime Coverage
Trafficked with Mariana van Zeller: "Black Market Love" (National Geographic); Fault Lines: "Crackdown: Deported Under Trump" (Al Jazeera International USA); "Fighting to Serve" (Evident Media); The Whole Story with Anderson Cooper: "Justice Defenders: Change Inside Prison" (CNN Worldwide); "Murder Has Two Faces" (ABC News); "The Rise of America's ICE Towns" (Bloomberg Originals)	"Wicked Game: Devil in the Desert" (ABC News); Trafficked with Mariana van Zeller: "Cartel USA" (National Geographic); "Hey Beautiful: Anatomy of a Romance Scam" (ABC News); "The Philippines Mayor With a Dark Secret" (Bloomberg Originals); Dateline NBC: "Return to the Lake" (NBC News); "Scamanda" (ABC News)

=== Spanish Language Programming ===
Outstanding News Program in Spanish	Outstanding Journalist in Spanish Language Media
Jorge Ramos: Así Veo las Cosas (Tres Alebrijes); Al Rojo Vivo (Telemundo); Noticiero Univision (Univision); PrimerImpacto (TelevisaUnivision); Spectrum Noticias Todo el Día (Spectrum Noticias)	Victor Valles Mata (TelevisaUnivision); Marlene Guzmán (Noticias Telemundo); Francisco Fajardo Nungaray (Noticias Telemundo); Jorge Ramos (Tres Alebrijes)
Outstanding Coverage of a Breaking News Story in Spanish	Outstanding Investigative News Coverage in Spanish
Noticias Telemundo: "Cobertura de los Incencios en Los Angeles" (Noticias Telemundo); "California en Llamas" (Univision); Noticias Telemundo: "Los Angeles: Entre Protestas y Redadas Migratorias" (Noticias Telemundo); "Nuestra América, Todas las Caras" (TelevisaUnivision)	"Sobreviviendo al CECOT" (ProPublica / The Texas Tribune); "Alcatraz de los Caimanes: Campo de Prisioneros" (TelevisaUnivision); Noticiero Univision: "Luigi Mangione: Anatomy of a Crime" (Univision); Bloomberg Investigates: "Muerte en la Montaña de Siete Colores" (Bloomberg Originals); Noticias Telemundo Ahora: "Planeta Tierra - Microplásticos: La Amenaza Invisible" (Noticias Telemundo)
Outstanding Feature Story in Spanish
Frontline features ProPublica: "Estatus: Venezolano" (ProPublica); Fault Lines: "De Ningún Lado" (Al Jazeera International USA); N+Despierta: "Michoacán: Vivir entre Explosivos Terrestres y Aéreos" (Vix); Noticias Telemundo Ahora: "Ni Hombre Ni Mujer: Intersexual" (Noticias Telemundo); Noticias Telemundo Ahora: "Talento Desperdiciado: Universidades, Latinos y Trump" (Noticias Telemundo)

=== Documentary Programming ===
Best Documentary	Outstanding Arts and Culture Documentary
Prime Minister (HBO); POV: "Black Snow" (PBS); Hurricane Katrina: Race Against Time (National Geographic); Independent Lens: "Life After" (PBS); Love + War (National Geographic); Frontline: "2000 Meters to Andriivka" (PBS); Turning Point: The Vietnam War (Netflix); POV: "Union" (PBS)	Great Performances: "Tiler Peck: Suspending Time" (PBS); Jaws at 50: The Definitive Inside Story (National Geographic); The Merchants of Joy (Prime Video); The New Yorker at 100 (Netflix); Songs from the Hole (Netflix); Sunday Best: The Untold Story of Ed Sullivan (MRC); Independent Lens: "We Want the Funk!" (PBS)
Outstanding Current Affairs Documentary	Outstanding Social Issue Documentary
Lost in the Jungle (National Geographic); Frontline: "Antidote" (PBS); Independent Lens: "Life After" (PBS); Frontline: "2000 Meters to Andriivka" (PBS); Thoughts & Prayers (HBO)	POV: "The Ride Ahead" (PBS); Frontline: "Born Poor" (PBS); Enigma (HBO); Katrina: Come Hell and High Water (Netflix); Doc World: "Searching for Amani" (World Channel)
Outstanding Politics and Government Documentary	Outstanding Business and Economic Documentary
Prime Minister (HBO); Bodyguard of Lies (Paramount+); The Dark Money Game (HBO); Hollywoodgate (Fourth Act Film); Doc World: "The Making of a Japanese" (World Channel)	Can't Look Away: The Case Against Social Media (Bloomberg Originals); Bribe, Inc. (Stan); POV: "Driver" (PBS); POV: "Made in Ethiopia" (PBS); Voces: "Slumlord Millionaire" (PBS)
Outstanding Investigative Documentary	Outstanding Historical Documentary
Critical Incident: A Death at the Border (HBO); Cover-Up (Netflix); Predators (MTV); The Stringer (Netflix); Frontline: "Syria's Detainee Files" (PBS)	Simon Schama: The Holocaust, 80 Years On (PBS); Becoming Katharine Graham (Life Stories); Becoming Thurgood: America's Social Architect (PBS); American Masters: "The Disappearance of Miss Scott" (PBS); Hurricane Katrina: Race Against Time (National Geographic); Turning Point: The Vietnam War (Netflix); Vietnam: The War That Changed America (Apple TV+)
Outstanding Science and Technology Documentary	Outstanding Nature Documentary
The Memory of Darkness, Light, and Ice (Metamorph Films); Nova: "Critical Condition: Health in Black America" (PBS); Nova: "Operation Space Station" (PBS); Sally (National Geographic); Titan: The OceanGate Disaster (Netflix)	Secrets of the Penguins (National Geographic); Nature: "Katavi: Africa's Fallen Paradise" (PBS); The Last Rhinos: A New Hope (National Geographic); Shark Whisperer (Netflix); Nature: "Willow: Diary of a Mountain Lion" (PBS)
Outstanding Crime and Justice Documentary	Outstanding Short Documentary
Independent Lens: "The Strike" (PBS); Aileen: Queen of the Serial Killers (Netflix); A Deadly American Marriage (Netflix); The Fox Hollow Murders: Playground of a Serial Killer (ABC News); No Justice, Just Kills (BBC Select); Oklahoma City Bombing: American Terror (Netflix)	Projecting Protest (Scripps News); POV Shorts: "Chasing Time" (PBS); Give Me Shelter (The Guardian); Heist (Pale Blue Dot Films); The New Yorker Documentary: "Last Days on Lake Trinity" (The New Yorker); The Quilters (Netflix)

=== Craft ===
Outstanding Video Journalism: News	Outstanding Cinematography: Documentary
"Filmed in Gaza" – Samed Abu Zarifa, Ehab Al Bardini, Samir Al Boji, and Khaldoon Eid (NBC News); 60 Minutes: "Flights of the Monarchs" – Eric Kerchner, Don Lee, Drew Levinson, and Ben McCoy (CBS News); Fault Lines: "Kids Under Fire" – Singeli Agnew, Mohammed Ibaida, and Hussien Jaber (Al Jazeera International USA); Fault Lines: "The Last Lifeline" – Rodrigo Galdos (Al Jazeera International USA); Frontline: "Strike on Iran: The Nuclear Question" – Nominees to be determined (PBS); Trafficked with Mariana van Zeller: "The Tranq Dope Underground" – Frederic Menou and Joshua Flannigan (National Geographic); Frontline: "Strike on Iran: The Nuclear Question" – Nominees to be determined (PBS)	Secrets of the Penguins: "Heart of the Emperors" – Bertie Gregory, Ben Joiner, Pete McCowen, Johnny Rogers, Helen Hobin, Sara Matasick, and Olly Meacock (National Geographic); Air Force Elite: Thunderbirds – Michael Fitzmaurice, Zach Osterhout, Cole Becker, Kevin Burroughs, Nash Howe, Connor Kelsey, Makana Laboy, Ilja Maran, Neil Peterson, Marc Ritzema, Matt Wilcox, and Moji Wilson (Netflix); Frontline: "2000 Meters to Andriivka" – Mstyslav Chernov and Alex Babenko (PBS); Pangolin: Kulu's Journey – Steven Dover, Warren Smart, and Gareth Thomas (Netflix); Surviving Black Hawk Down – Tim Cragg and Stefano Ferrari (Netflix); Underdogs – Matt Aeberhard, Dan Beecham, Tom Beldam, Ralph Bower, Matthew Conner Robinson, Alex Cooke, Luke Cormack, Robin Cox, Tom Crowley, Simon De Glanville, Rob Drewett, Dawson Dunning, Neil Fairlie, Tom Fitz, Sue Gibson, Skip Hobbie, Robert Hollingworth, Matthew Hood, Dan Hunter, Alex Jones, Jonathan Jones, Max Kolbl, Michael Male, Pete Matthews, Hugh Miller, Oliver Mueller, Roger Munns, Greg Nelson, Will Nicholls, Erin Ranney, Johnny Rogers, Tom Ross, Tom Rowland, James Salisbury, John Shier, Hector Skevington-Postles, Warwick Sloss, Romily Spears, Sam Stewart, Andrew Studer, Gavin Thurston, Tom Walker, Rob Whitworth, Miguel Willis, George Woodcock, Dheeraj Aithal, Manuel Atatsa, Raphael Boudreault-Simard, Gemilang Dini AR Rasyid, Job Githaka, Russ McLaughlin, Ben Platts, Dan Proud, Steve Quan, Archisman Saha, Chris Scarffe, and Rollo Wood (National Geographic)
Outstanding Direction: News	Outstanding Direction: Documentary
Trafficked with Mariana van Zeller: "Black Market Love" – Sarah Holm Johansen (National Geographic); Trafficked with Mariana van Zeller: "Brides for Sale" – Robert Muraskin (National Geographic); Hold the Line: "Can the Southern Baptist Convention Survive Without Women Pastors?" – Daniel Lombroso (The New Yorker); "Hey Beautiful: Anatomy of a Romance Scam" – Nominees to be determined (ABC News); Trafficked with Mariana van Zeller: "The Tranq Dope Underground" – Eric Strauss (National Geographic); "Will Reeve: Finding My Father" – Nominees to be determined (ABC News)	Frontline: "2000 Meters to Andriivka" – Mstyslav Chernov (PBS); Apocalypse in the Tropics – Petra Costa (Netflix); Katrina: Come Hell and High Water – Geeta Gandbhir, Samantha Knowles, and Spike Lee (Netflix); Independent Lens: "Life After" – Reid Davenport (PBS); It's Never Over, Jeff Buckley – Amy Berg (HBO); Sally – Cristina Costantini (National Geographic); The Stringer – Bao Nguyen (Netflix); Vietnam: The War That Changed America – Rob Coldstream (Apple TV+)
Outstanding Editing: News	Outstanding Editing: Documentary
"Filmed in Gaza" – Froy Amarillas, Tate James, William Miller, and Greg Wright (NBC News); 60 Minutes: "The Bus on Route 62" – Peter Berman (CBS News); Trafficked with Mariana van Zeller: "Cartel USA" – Mike Gehman (National Geographic); Fault Lines: "Kids Under Fire" – Adrienne Haspel (Al Jazeera International USA); "Operation Return to Sender" – Jennifer Smart (Evident Media); 60 Minutes: "The Sherpas of Everest" – Sean Kelly (CBS News)	Cover-Up – Peter Bowman, Amy Foote, Laura Poitras, Ra'anan Alexandrowicz, Adam Bolt, Sabine Hoffman, Ana Maldonado, Nat Jencks, and Kelli Miller (Netflix); Folktales – Nathan Punwar, Ashley Moradipour, Hana Wuerker, Victor Artesona, Tim Gray, and Ben Kiviat (Magnolia Pictures); Katrina: Come Hell and High Water – Arielle Ansalem, Anna Auster, Barry Brown, Erin Barnett (Netflix); Independent Lens: "Life After" – Don Bernier, Shannon Breen, and David Teague (PBS); Love + War – Keiko Deguchi, Hypatia Porter, and Rossana Gomes (National Geographic); Frontline: "2000 Meters to Andriivka" – Michelle Mizner (PBS); Thoughts & Prayers – Carter Gunn and Myles Kane (HBO); The White House Effect – Daniel Claridge, Pedro Kos, and Sara Newens (Netflix)
Outstanding Graphic Design: News	Outstanding Graphic Design: Documentary
"Johnny Harris" – Iz Harris, Johnny Harris, Mark Cernosia, Karla Núñez de Madariaga, Parjanya Christian Holtz, Ahmed Jasim, Mustafa Jasim, Aakash Kalaria, and Jeremy Shuback (Newpress); "The Hidden Cost of South Sudan's Oil Boom" – Rubab Shakir, Ken Kwong, and Alex Sears (Bloomberg Originals); "The China is Beating India in Its Own Backyard" – Rubab Shakir and Craig Maxwell (Bloomberg Originals); "One Spark Award: The 2025 LA Wildfires" – Michael Potts, Nick Weinmiller, Mark Davenport, Matt Sitkowski, James Burrows, Kyung Ko, and Brian Kucinski (The Weather Channel); Noticias Telemundo Ahora: "Winter Storm VR" – Fabian Albarrracin, Andrea Berry, Manashi Mukherjee, Carlos Robles, Alberto Franca, Osmany Gomez, Carlos Rivero, Edward Tejeiro, and Robert Castañeda (Telemundo)	In Waves and War – Marcus Armitage, Philip Hunt, Steve Small, Gergely Wootsch, and Nikki Kefford (Netflix); Frontline: "Antidote" – David Penn (PBS); The Gilgo Beach Killer: House of Secrets – Albert Corona, Joe Pascale, Jonathan Taylor, Tnaya Witmer, Carlo Sa, James Bolan, Jessica Ledoux, and Lisa Bolan (Peacock); POV: "The Ride Ahead" – Xilia Faye and Ben Luce (PBS); Titanic: The Digital Resurrection – Manuel Fuentes, Ceri Passmore, and Matthew Baker-Jones (National Geographic); Underdogs – Alex Dilworth, David Whittle, Peter Duncan, Steven Gomez, Jamie Child, Jake Brewer, Dan Grzonka, Millie Linsey, Cole Smith, Celeste Bothwick, and Scott Metcalfe (National Geographic)
Outstanding Research: News	Outstanding Research: Documentary
Trafficked with Mariana van Zeller: "Brides for Sale" – Lilli Karkowski, Tim Murphy, Solomon Polshek, Jeffrey D. Allen, Robert Muraskin, Jeffrey Plunkett, Mariana van Zeller, Sierra Robinson, Christopher Weeks, Paul Burger, Erin Fifer, Mark Levenstein, Eugen Bräunig, and Cara Fitts (National Geographic); Trafficked with Mariana van Zeller: "Black Market Love" – Lilli Karkowski, Tim Murphy, Solomon Polshek, Jeffrey D. Allen, Sarah Holm Johansen, Jeffrey Plunkett, Mariana van Zeller, Sierra Robinson, Christopher Weeks, Manuel Lavalle, Abi Speers, Erin Fifer, Mark Levenstein, and Cara Fitts (National Geographic); Trafficked with Mariana van Zeller: "The Great American Rehab Scam" – Lilli Karkowski, Tim Murphy, Solomon Polshek, Jeffrey D. Allen, Jeffrey Plunkett, Mariana van Zeller, Sierra Robinson, Christopher Weeks, Erin Fifer, Mark Levenstein, Eugen Bräunig, and Cara Fitts (National Geographic); Trafficked with Mariana van Zeller: "The Tranq Dope Underground" – Lilli Karkowski, Tim Murphy, Solomon Polshek, Jeffrey D. Allen, Eric Straus, Jeffrey Plunkett, Mariana van Zeller, Sierra Robinson, Christopher Weeks, Zoey Haar, Erin Fifer, Mark Levenstein, Eugen Bräunig, and Cara Fitts (National Geographic); 20/20 & ABC News Live: "Operation Babylift: The 50 Year Journey" – Janice Johnston, Natalie Cardenas, Kieran McGirl, and Brian Mezerski (ABC News); "Chasing a Ghost: The Search for Austin Tice" – Nominees to be determined (CNN Worldwide)	Turning Point: The Vietnam War – Doan Hoàng Curtis, Sarah Huisenga, Bo Kovitz, Cao Minh-Phuong, Tommy Nguyen, Sabrina Parke, Mori Rothman, Cheyenne Tan, Sarah Villareal, CJ Walker, and Helen Magowan (Netflix); The American Revolution – Grace Bartosh, Salimah El-Amin, Rosie Feerick, Shyala Jayasinghe, Vicky Lee, Megan Ruffe, and Mike Welt (PBS); Hurricane Katrina: Race Against Time – Manelle Dridi, Stephanie Mulcihy, Julieann Galdames, and Bennet Logan (National Geographic); Oklahoma City Bombing: One Day in America – Margaret Beckett, Jacqui Edwards, Jo Marshal, and Erin Fifer (National Geographic); Independent Lens: "The Strike" – Lucas Guilkey, Michael Montgomery, and JoeBill Muñoz (PBS); The Stringer – Ava Romero, Terri Lichstein, Fiona Turner, Lê Vân, and Lina Caicedo (Netflix); Frontline: "Syria's Detainee Files" – Sasha Joelle Achilli, Saad Al Nassife, Amel Guettatfi, and Sara Obeidat (PBS); The White House Effect – Yael Chanoff, Gideon Kennedy, and Rich Remsberg (Netflix)
Outstanding Music Composition: Documentary	Outstanding Sound: Documentary
Pangolin: Kulu's Journey – Anne Nikitin (Netflix); Bring Them Home – Roger Suen, Shadow Devereaux, and Dustin Walters (PBS); POV Shorts: "Chasing Time" – Mark Crawford and Jeff Orlowski-Yang (PBS); The Final Copy of Ilon Specht – Katya Richardson, Gina Luciani, Katya Richardson, and Jonathan Schlitt (Breakwater Studios); The Last Rhinos: A New Hope – Ben Zebelman (National Geographic); Songs from the Hole – Garfield Bright III, Tairiq Bright, Richie Reseda. and JJ'88 (Netflix); Vietnam: The War That Changed America – David Schweitzer (Apple TV+)	Underdogs – George Fry, Roy Noy, Oliver Baldwin, Graham Wild, Dan Brown, Jonathon Cawte, and Andy Patterson (National Geographic); Lost in the Jungle – Zach Booth, Deborah Wallach, Chris Chae, Manuel Díaz, Tom Fleischman, Tyler Newhouse, John Moros, Leslie Bloome, Shaun Brennan, Chris White, Ryan Collison, Connor Nagy, Nick Caramela, Daniel Nassar, and Daniel Díaz (National Geographic); Love + War – Adam Grass, Avantika Nimbalker, Paul Thompson, Deborah Wallach, Tom Fleischman, Ric Schnupp, Gareth Wood, Tyler Newhouse, Matt Rigby, Leslie Bloome, Shaun Brennan, Chris White, Ryan Collison, Connor Nagy, and Nick Carmela (National Geographic); Independent Lens: "The Strike" – Benny Mouthon and Randy Matuszewsk (PBS); Secrets of the Penguins: "Survival of the Smartest" – Miller Castro, Jabu Msomi, Zubin Sarosh, Jay Price, Maggy Apodaca, Tom Foster, Adam Johnson, Stephen Moore, and Sam Castleton (National Geographic); Turning Point: The Vietnam War – Kamau Andrae, Tom Bergin, Francis X. Coakley, Thomas W. Dauenhauer, Kenneth Daniel Hada, Tô Trung Hiếu, Damian Irving, Mark Maloof, Evan Robinson, Paul Stula, Aaron Webster, Warren Wolfe, Peter Mullen, and Ryan David Adams (Netflix); Independent Lens: "We Want the Funk!" – Jose Araujo, Enrique Larreal, Kat Iossa, Olivia Posner, and Benny Mouthon (PBS)
Outstanding Writing: News	Outstanding Writing: Documentary
Fault Lines: "Kids Under Fire" – Laila Al-Arian, Amel Guettatfi, and Josh Rushing (Al Jazeera International USA); Trafficked with Mariana van Zeller: "Brides for Sale" – Robert Muraskin and Jeffrey Plunkett (National Geographic); Trafficked with Mariana van Zeller: "Cartel USA" – Jeffrey Plunkett and Tom Vitale (National Geographic); ABC News Live Prime with Linsey Davis: "The Long Train Ride Home: Remembering Emmett Till" – Steve Osunsami (ABC News); ABC News Live Prime with Linsey Davis: "Revisiting the Voting Rights Act" – Steve Osunsami (ABC News); "US Aid Cuts in Afghanistan" – Nominees to be determined (CNN Worldwide)	Underdogs – Polly Billam and Dan Rees (National Geographic); Bring Them Home – Daniel Glick and Ivan MacDonald (PBS); Frontline: "2000 Meters to Andriivka" – Mstyslav Chernov (PBS); Songs from the Hole – JJ'88 and Contessa Gayles (Netflix); The Stringer – Gary Knight, Terri Lichstein, Graham Taylor, and Fiona Turner (Netflix)
Outstanding Art Direction / Set Decoration / Scenic Design: Documentary	Outstanding Cold Open or Title Sequence: News
Songs from the Hole – Contessa Gayles and Richie Reseda (Netflix); The Gilgo Beach Killer: House of Secrets – Kelly Grace Sullivan, Henry Dolan, Sabrina Canals, Lisa Bolan, and Chelsea Pitti-Fernandez (Peacock); One Night in Idaho: The College Murders – Bryan Hodge and Jesse Ministero (Prime Video); One to One: John & Yoko – Kevin Timon Hill, Tatiana Macdonald, and Erica Dorn (HBO); Sally – Jon Bush and Alfie Kim Koetter (National Geographic)	Bloomberg Primer: "How New Magnets Could Power the Future" – Jordan Oplinger, Tre Shallowhorn, Tom Connors, and Alan Jeffries (Bloomberg Originals); "Born to Be Viral: The Real Lives of Kidfluencers" – Nominees to be determined (ABC News); "Hey Beautiful: Anatomy of a Romance Scam" – Nominees to be determined (ABC News); Trafficked with Mariana van Zeller: "The Great American Rehab Scam" – Jeffrey Plunkett, Nick Brigden, Rich Campbell, Christian Glawe, Hunter Gross, and Jenna Millman (National Geographic); Trafficked with Mariana van Zeller: "Shark Hunters" – Jeffrey Plunkett, Hunter Gross, and Robert Muraskin (National Geographic); Trafficked with Mariana van Zeller: "The Tranq Dope Underground" – Jeffrey Plunkett, Yasu Tsuji, and Eric Strauss (National Geographic)
Outstanding Promotional Announcement: News	Outstanding Promotional Announcement: Documentary
"The Substance and Soul of the South" – Edward Reid, Amie Green, Leah Hall, Girard Hardy, Jeff Mielcarz, Tom Carter, and Jason Johnson (AJC); Trafficked with Mariana van Zeller – Nicole Strong, Denzel Dykes, Mariano Barreiro, Aaron Goldman, Shannon Ryan, Isabella Alonzo, Joe Ortiz, Jacob Alberts, Matt Jenkins, Colin DeVarney, Justin Hollis, Brian Everett, Tyler Korba, and Daniela Delgado (National Geographic); "Scamanda" – Nominees to be determined (ABC News); "We the People Brand Campaign" – Joanna Fillie, Darren Foldes, Mitch Monson, Mikon van Gastel, Joe Wright, Frances Yeoland, Kara Calise, Amber Park, September Raines, Mika Saulitis, Eduardo Palma, Lauren Stuart, Bethany Mollenkof, Samantha Stone, Luke Barker, Tom Clendenin, Robert Poulton, Tara Matthews, Brian Matthews, and Maritza Berta Misan (MS NOW); "Will Reeve: Finding My Father" – Nominees to be determined (ABC News)	Chris Hemsworth: A Road Trip to Remember – Joel Douris, Dylan Matthews, James Sweeney, Nicole Strong, Mariano Barreiro, Aaron Goldman, Shannon Ryan, Joe Ortiz, Kendrah Polk, David Numbers, Colin DeVarney, Dallas Taylor, Tyler Korba, and Brian Everett (National Geographic); Love + War – Ben Emanuel, Nicole Strong, Jeremy Greene, Becky Dale, Mariano Barreiro, Aaron Goldman, Karla Menendez, John Salazar, Carlos Esperon, Shannon Ryan, Joe Ortiz, Matt Jenkins, David Numbers, Brian Everett, and Tyler Korba (National Geographic); Nature – Fred Kaufman, Laura Metzger Lynch, Patrick Krass, and Jon Berman (PBS); Hurricane Katrina: Race Against Time – Jordan Toopes, David Leith Fraser, Dave Lindblad, Greg Smith, Tiz Simpson, Nicole Strong, Mariano Barreiro, Aaron Goldman, Shannon Ryan, Joe Ortiz, Matt Jenkins, Brian Everett, Tyler Korba, and Daniela Delgado (National Geographic); In Waves and War – Jessica Anthony, Michael Lange, Bonni Cohen, and Jon Shenk (Netflix)
Outstanding Technical Excellence: News	Outstanding Lighting Direction: Documentary
ABC World News Tonight with David Muir: "Live from the Southern California Fires" – Matthew Fox, Ronal Ellison, Phillip Black, Sabrina Heredia Alvarez, Glen Marchese, Henry Reed, John Giuliante, Kaelyn Heywood, Peter Sloan, Dan Cook, Dustin Eddo, John Fonseca, Sean Garcia, Daniel Lapham, Alan McKenzie, Gary Stevenson, Fabian Urbina, and Chris Gillhaus (ABC News); CBS Evening News – Ryan Klink, Alison Hawley, Brian Nalesnik, Clayton Wells, Andrew Stucky, Gabriel Almanzar, Miguel Aviles, Dominic Salvatore, Phil Selby, Jaltej Patel, Jordan Beisel, Sheldon Mahabal, Bucky O'Neil, Karol Perkowski, Kalyssa Carter, Hope Obi, Matt Mansfield, Previn Ramchandani, Jesse Spellman, Igor Bangiyev, Jim Ruane, Dave Beatty, Dave Ryan, Lee Solomon, Tim Hunter, Emilio Incerto, Anthony King, Lindsley Newbury, Matthew Brierley, William C. McGill, Clarke Smith, Kate Cheshire, Matthew Guild, Doug Holly, Sunkyu Koo, Sergei Pedan, James Brennan, and Georgino Cruz (CBS News); CNN's The Fourth in America – Tom Ebel, Cherron Garrett, Lauren Holliger, Christ Khodadadi, Scott Low, Mike McSweeney, Jason Strachan, Amber Swanson, Reza Baktar, Justin McClimans, Steve Fineberg, Alan Kain, Jose Nunez, Gina Pepe, Derek Wagner, Marty Walter, Jeff Watts, Adrienne Banks, Brian Decker, Adam Ferguson, Matthew Jacobson, Christian Marasco, Corey Terrell, Christine Vlossak, Jose Avila-Kelly, Alexa Bennewitz, Ashley Billings, Melissa Block, David Burgess, Abigail Crutchfield, William Dugan, David Foote, Jorge Galvez, Brian Gassen, Alex Gee, Steve Graham, Clayton Green, Jason Hochheimer, Oliver Janney, Eva Marble, Kirk McDonald, Ty Nguyen, Chuck Parker, Ryan Pollock, Carolee Resca, Sara Rudolph, Greg Seaby, Jaime Solano, Michael Vason, Sophie Wood, Sinan Alawsi, Nihad Ali Akbar, Todd Anderson, Shawn Behan, John Beyer, Kevin Blakley, John Camacho, John Cunha, Robert Frantz, Gus Green, Kenny Harris, Matt Hoose, Luis Huaman, Benjamaar Hubbard, Michael Humphrey, Liz Katheder, Mati Kerpen, Paul Klages, Zac Larew, Blake Leach, Louie Maliski, Ragheed Maloyan, Al Meshberg, Jonathan Miller, Steve Mills, Jonathan Myers, Randall Notman, Chris Nowak, Michael Oat, Eric Odendahl, Bill Otoole, Jordan Placie, Leonard Sampson, Richard Sinclair, Chris Stewart, Sara Taba, Dawid Vermaak, Doug Wake, Timothy Daoust, Jerry Appleman, Marc Halualani, Nicole Brooks, Joe Brownlee, Jamie Fredlund, Gary Krakower, Nicole Vason, Ruby Williams, Doug McKinley, Norman McMillian, Chris Abreu, Chad Audino, Chris Cross, Jameel Lee, German Lievano, Paul Miller, Derek St. Onge, John Anglim, Mark Biello, Barton Bishoff, Ken Borland, Andy Buck, Michael Calloway, Jim Castel, Stuart Clark, Manny Climaco, Bob Crowley, Styke Dimas, Rod Griola, Walter Imparato, Leon Jobe, Nick Leimbach, Wes Little, Mike Love, Albert Lutan, Carlos Martinelli, Jay McMichael, Joe Merkel, Kevin Myers, Scott Pisczek, Josh Repogle, Adrian Reyes, John Rubenstahl, Tyler Ryan, Jonathan Schaer, Harlan Schmidt, Ricky Shine, Andrew Smith, Dom Swann, David von Blohn, Joe Wagener, Steve Williams, Adia Jacobs, Elizabeth Stevens, Lee Carroll, Brittany Shoemake, Pablo Parada, Doug Schantz, Nicole Fisher, John Davies, Carlos Linares, and Gabe Lopez (CNN Worldwide); CNN's New Year's Eve Coverage – Nominees to be determined (CNN Wolrdwide); "Presidential Inauguration Pool Feed" – Andrew Godsick, Susan Vitorovich, Sarah Brooke, Dawn DiCicco, Brian Zeitchick, Mike Barsky, Justin Bennett, Tommy Corigliano, Collin Crews, Cindy Durland, Andy Fowler, James Goldsmith, Carlos Gonzalez, Matt Jones, Ryan Kiernan, Dave Larson, Matt Lassandro, Andrew McCoy, Carlton Mohabir, Daniel Parkinson, Brandon Pineda, Anthony Ransom, Vin Rega, Joe Shack, Joe Suite, Steve Webster, Zeke Wohlrab, Wesley Scruggs, Matt Bauer, Joe Hoerdeman, Charles Hoffman, Joe Leible, Joe Shalhoup, Hanna Oneda, Mike Peters, Justin Amash, David Aronson, Joe Barsky, Joe Cook, Rudy Estrada, Phil Ferzacca, Julion Francis, Thomas Galloway, Ryan Goldsmith, Edmund Hatch, Charles Hill, Edgar Lane, Barbara Morrisey-Marquez, Mike Novak, Jim Novosel, Bern Rexer, Jerrod Richardson, Myles Richardson, Brian Rose, Kevin Santos, Andy Scritchfield, Zach Sumpolec, Jud Williams, Jon Goss, Steve Brill, Paul Lohr, Cate Cetta Scola, Adam Wald, Jay Blackman, and Stacey Klein (NBC News)	Cold Case: The Tylenol Murders – T.J. Alston and Jeff Hutchens (Netflix); American Manhunt: Osama bin Laden – Peter Hutchens (Netflix); Hollywood Hustler: Glitz, Glam, Scam – Dawn Bender and Luke Fraser (Prime Video); Lockerbie: The Bombing of Pan Am 103 – Will Pugh (CNN); Turning Point: The Vietnam War – Jay Visit (Netflix)

=== Regional News ===
Outstanding Regional News Story: Breaking/Spot News	Outstanding Regional News Story: Investigative
"Hurricane Francine Live Rescue" (WDSU – New Orleans, Louisiana / Mid-America Emmy Awards); "Avioneta Se Estrella Contra Residencia en Aguadilla" (WLII-DT – Caguas, Puerto Rico / Suncoast Emmy Awards); "Fuego en Fin de Año" (WLII-DT – Caguas, Puerto Rico / Suncoast Emmy Awards); "Ranchero Tornado" (WTSP – St. Petersburg, Florida / Suncoast Emmy Awards); "Wilmer-Hutchins High School Shooting" (WFAA – Dallas, Texas / Lone Star Emmy Awards)	"Inspecting the Inspectors" (KMOV – St. Louis, Missouri / Mid-America Emmy Awards); "13 Investigates: High Stakes" (WTHR – Indianapolis, Indiana / Midwest Emmy Awards); "A Deceptive Diocese" (WEWS-TV – Cleveland, Ohio / Mid-Atlantic Emmy Awards); "In Plane Sight: The Fix" (WANF – Atlanta, Georgia / Southeast Emmy Awards); "Reading Reset" (WANF – Atlanta, Georgia / Southeast Emmy Awards)
Outstanding Regional Documentary
Blue – The Life and Art of George Rodriguez (WLAE-TV – New Orleans, Louisiana / Mid-America Emmy Awards); 23 Seconds: A Louisville Mass Shooting (WAVE – Louisville, Kentucky / Ohio Valley Emmy Awards); How to Sue the Klan (Reel South – South Carolina / Southeast Emmy Awards); Major Taylor: Champion of the Race (WTIU Public Television – Bloomington, Indiana / Midwest Emmy Awards); Stories Rewritten – The Knoxville Homeless Crisis (Sonic Palette Productions – Knoxville, Tennessee / Midsouth Emmy Awards)

== Notes ==
The HBO documentary about New Zealand Prime Minister Jacinda Ardern simply titled Prime Minister won two awards including Best Documentary.
