= Vote (disambiguation) =

A vote is a formal method of choosing in an election.

Vote(s) or The Vote may also refer to:

== Music ==
- V.O.T.E., an album by Chris Stamey and Yo La Tengo, 2004
- "Vote", a song by the Submarines from Declare a New State!, 2006
- "Vote, Vote, Vote", a song by Raffi, 2020
- "Vote!", a song by the Linda Lindas, 2020

== Television ==
- "The Vote" (Dynasty 1983), an episode
- "The Vote" (Dynasty 1986), an episode
- "The Vote" (The Guardian), an episode

== Other uses ==
- Vote, Virginia, an unincorporated community in the United States
- The Vote, a 2015 play by James Graham
- The Vote (newspaper), a 1909-1933 newspaper of the Women's Freedom League
- Vote.org, an American left-wing nonprofit organization
- Votians, a Finno-Ugric people

== See also ==
- Voter (disambiguation)
- Voting logic
