= Black Snow =

Black Snow may refer to:

== Novels and plays ==
- Black Snow, a 1993 novel by Liu Heng
- Black Snow (novel), a 1967 comedic novel by Mikhail Bulgakov
  - Black Snow (play), a dramatization of Bulgakov's novel, by Keith Reddin
- The Black Snow, a 2014 novel by Paul Lynch

== Films and television ==
- Black Snow (1965 film), a 1965 film directed by Tetsuji Takechi
- Black Snow (1990 film), a 1990 Chinese film
- Black Snow (1990 US film), a 1990 American film starring Jane Badler
- Black Snow (2017 film), a 2017 Argentine-Spanish film
- Black Snow (TV series), a 2022 Australian crime drama series
- Black Snow (2024 film), 2024 documentary film

== Music ==
- "Black Snow", a 2018 song by Oneohtrix Point Never from Age Of
- Black Snow (Fleurety album), a 1993 album by Fleurety
- Black Snow, a 2023 song by Aesop Rock from Integrated Tech Solutions

== Other uses ==
- A ring name used by wrestler Booker T

== See also ==
- Black Snows, a 1962 novel by Zaim Topčić
