= News and Documentary Emmy Awards =

American awards for outstanding national television news and documentary programming

News & Documentary Emmy Awards
- Current: 47th News and Documentary Emmy Awards
- Awarded for: Outstanding achievement in national news and documentary programming
- Country: United States
- Presented by: National Academy of Television Arts & Sciences
- First award: 1980
- Website: https://theemmys.tv/news/

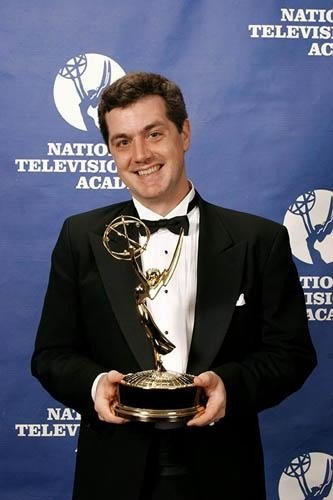
TV producer Bruce Kennedy accepting a News & Documentary Emmy Award for Outstanding Individual Achievement in a Craft: Research, in 2005

The News & Documentary Emmy Awards, or News & Documentary Emmys, are part of the extensive range of Emmy Awards for artistic and technical merit for the American television industry. Bestowed by the National Academy of Television Arts and Sciences (NATAS), the News & Documentary Emmys are presented in recognition of excellence in American news and documentary programming.

Ceremonies are generally held in the fall, with the Emmys handed out in about 40 awards categories. Only two of these award categories honor local news programming, while the rest are for national programming. Most Emmys for local news and documentary programming are instead awarded during the Regional Emmys.

Before the News & Documentary Emmy Awards, news and documentary were the focus of various short-lived categories at the Primetime Emmy Awards, including "Best News Program" (1951), "Best Program Of News Or Sports" (1954), "Best Special Event Or News Program" (1956), "Best Coverage Of A Newsworthy Event" (1957), "Best Coverage Of An Unscheduled Newsworthy Event" (1958), "Best News Reporting Series" (1959), "Best News Commentator Or Analyst" (1955–1959), "Outstanding Program Achievement In The Field Of News" (1961–1963), "Outstanding Program Achievement In The Field Of News Commentary Or Public Affairs" (1963–1964), "Outstanding Program Achievement In The Field Of News Reports" (1964), "Outstanding Achievement In Cinematography For News And Documentary Programming, Documentary" (1970–1972), "Outstanding Achievement In Film Editing For News And Documentary Programming, Documentary" (1971–1972), "Outstanding Achievement In Film Editing For News And Documentary Programming, Regularly Scheduled News Programs And Coverage Of Special Events" (1970–1972), and "Outstanding Achievement In Cinematography For News And Documentary Programming, Regularly Scheduled News Programs And Coverage Of Special Events" (1970–1972).

== Rules ==
According to the News & Documentary Emmy rules, a show, documentary or news report must originally air on American television during the eligibility period between January 1 and December 31, and to at least 50 percent of the country. A foreign-produced show is usually ineligible unless it was a co-production with an American partner, and was originally committed to be aired on American television right from the start.

For the two award categories that honor local news programming, Outstanding Regional Story: Spot News and Outstanding Regional Story: Investigative Reporting, only news reports that have already won a Regional Emmy are eligible.

Entries must be submitted by March. Most award categories also require entries to include DVDs or tape masters of the show, documentary or news report. For the New Approaches categories, the video or multimedia is submitted online. In addition, a one-page essay describing why an entry is "Emmy-worthy" is also required.

Voting is done by peer judging panels between May and June. The academy solicits anybody with significant experience in national news or documentary reporting or production to serve as judges. Most categories have two voting rounds, with separate judging panels in each round. The top entries in each category are announced as the "nominations", and then the top entry is announced as the Emmy winner later at the awards ceremony.

== Award categories ==
=== National ===
- Regularly Scheduled Newscast
  - Outstanding Coverage of a Breaking News Story
  - Outstanding Continuing Coverage of a News Story
  - Outstanding Feature Story
  - Outstanding Investigative Journalism
  - Outstanding Business and Economic Reporting
- News Magazine
  - Outstanding Coverage of a Breaking News Story
  - Outstanding Continuing Coverage of a News Story
  - Outstanding Feature Story
  - Outstanding Investigative Journalism
  - Outstanding Business and Economic Reporting
- Long Form
  - Outstanding Live Coverage of a Current News Story
  - Outstanding Continuing Coverage of a News Story
  - Outstanding Investigative Journalism
  - Outstanding Informational Programming
  - Outstanding Historical Programming
  - Outstanding Business and Economic Reporting
- Outstanding Programming
  - Arts and Culture
  - Science and Technology
  - Nature
  - Outstanding Interview
  - Best Story in a Regularly Scheduled Newscast
  - Best Report in a News Magazine
  - Best Documentary
- New Approaches To News & Documentary Programming:
  - Current News Coverage
  - Documentaries
  - Arts, Lifestyle & Culture
- Outstanding Individual Achievement in a Craft:
  - Writing
  - Research
  - Cinematography - Nature
  - Cinematography - News Coverage / Documentaries
  - Editing
  - Editing–Quick Turnaround
  - Graphic Design & Art Direction
  - Music & Sound
  - Lighting Direction & Scenic Design
- Outstanding Promotional Announcement:
  - Institutional
  - Episodic

=== Regional ===
- Outstanding Regional News Story:
  - Spot News
  - Investigative Reporting

== List of ceremonies ==
- 31st News & Documentary Emmy Awards
- 32nd News & Documentary Emmy Awards
- 33rd News & Documentary Emmy Awards
- 34th News & Documentary Emmy Awards
- 40th News and Documentary Emmy Awards
- 41st News and Documentary Emmy Awards
- 42nd News and Documentary Emmy Awards
- 43rd News and Documentary Emmy Awards
- 44th News and Documentary Emmy Awards
- 45th News and Documentary Emmy Awards
- 46th News and Documentary Emmy Awards
- 47th News and Documentary Emmy Awards

== See also ==
- List of American television awards
