= Truth and Power =

American television documentary series

Truth and Power cover art (Season 1)

Truth and Power is an "investigative docuseries", narrated by Maggie Gyllenhaal and executive produced by Brian Knappenberger (The Internet's Own Boy: The Story of Aaron Swartz). It premiered on Pivot on January 22, 2016. Each episode tells the stories of "ordinary people going to extraordinary lengths to reveal corporate exploitation and infringement on civil liberties resulting from government overreach." The documentaries use interviews and uncovered documents to discuss the "issues of security, surveillance and profiteering in the digital age."

== Episodes ==
=== Season 1 (2016) ===
- Episode 1: #BlackLivesMatter
- Episode 2: Government-Sponsored Spyware
- Episode 3: The Stingray
- Episode 4: Prisoners for Sale
- Episode 5: Activists or Terrorists?
- Episode 6: Shooting the Messenger
- Episode 7: Hacking the Presidency
- Episode 8: Data Vampires
- Episode 9: Camp Justice
- Episode 10: Flying Robots
