= John Dragonetti =

American composer

- Also known as: Jack Drag, ToneTiger
- Born: Jackson, Michigan, U.S.
- Genres: Indie pop; Indie Rock
- Occupations: Musician; singer; record producer; composer; engineer
- Instruments: Vocals; computer; guitar; bass; drums; organ; synthesizer
- Years active: 1996–present
- Labels: Nettwerk Records; A&M Records
- Member of: The Submarines
- Website: www.tonetiger.com

John Dragonetti is an American composer, songwriter, and music producer based in Los Angeles, California. He is also a founding member (along with Blake Hazard) of the band The Submarines.

== Early life ==
Dragonetti was born in Jackson, MI. His family moved to Egypt, where his father was principal of the American School in Cairo, at age 5. He spent most of his childhood in Dubai, U.A.E before attending boarding school in Nicosia, Cyprus. After high school at TASIS in Cyprus, John moved to Boston to attend Berklee College of Music.

== Pop career ==
Dragonetti played in several bands in Boston, including The British Norberts (later, just The Norberts) and Wadi Trip. The British Norberts released a single in 1987 on the band's Moon Cheese label called "The Russians Are Playing With the Weather." The B-side was "Calling Sherlock Holmes." In 1996, Dragonetti began recording on 4-track cassette under the moniker Jack Drag. These home recordings were released by the Chapel Hill-based label, Hep-Cat. He later signed to A&M Records and released the band’s only major label LP, Dope Box, which was produced by Chris Shaw. Dragonetti released two more self-produced Jack Drag albums, Aviating and The Sun Inside.

In 2006 he formed The Submarines with Blake Hazard. The band toured extensively and released three albums on Nettwerk Records. The group's songs were heavily placed in films, television shows, and commercials such as Nick & Norah’s Infinite Playlist and Nip/Tuck. Most notably was for Apple’s iPhone ad campaign. The company licensed two songs, "Submarine Symphonika" and "You, Me and the Bourgeoisie" from Honeysuckle Weeks.

== Film and television ==
Dragonetti's first film score was for Doug Pray's Surfwise. He has also worked extensively with director Brian Knappenberger, composing the music for The Internet's Own Boy and We Are Legion: The Story of the Hacktivists. Among his television scores are the FX series Married and AMC’s Small Town Security. Dragonetti has also composed music for commercials including Volkswagen, Lexus, and Coca-Cola.

== Works ==
=== Film and television ===
- Web of Make Believe: Death, Lies & the Internet - 2022
- Truth and Power - 2016
- Baby, Baby, Baby - 2015
- Married - 2015
- About Scout - 2015
- (Dis)Honesty: The Truth About Lies - 2015
- Ice Warriors: USA Sled Hockey - 2014
- The Internet's Own Boy - 2014
- Frontline - 2012-2013
- Freeloaders - 2012
- Small Town Security - 2012
- We Are Legion - 2012
- The Secret Life of Scientists and Engineers - 2009-2011
- Big Ideas for a Small Planet - 2007-2009
- Surfwise - 2007
- Number 1 Single - 2006
- Father of the Pride - 2004-2005

=== Producer discography ===
Year	Artist	Album	Label
2014	Dylan Gardner	Adventures In Real Time	Bingo Masters Records
2011	Chadwick Stokes	Simmerkane II	Nettwerk Records
2011	The Submarines	Love Notes/Letter Bombs	Nettwerk Records
2008	The Submarines	Honeysuckle Weeks	Nettwerk Records
2006	The Submarines	Declare a New State!	Nettwerk Records
2003	Dear Leader	The Good Times are Killing Me	Lunch Records

=== Remixes ===
Title	Year	Artist(s)
Moving to Brussels	2015	Bhi Bhiman
Girlfriend	2010	Avril Lavigne
Oh, La	2009	Ra Ra Riot
Close Your Eyes We Are Blind	2008	Alaska In Winter
Hot Pink, Distorted	2006	50 Foot Wave
Otherside	2002	Josh Ritter
