= The Submarines =

American indie rock band

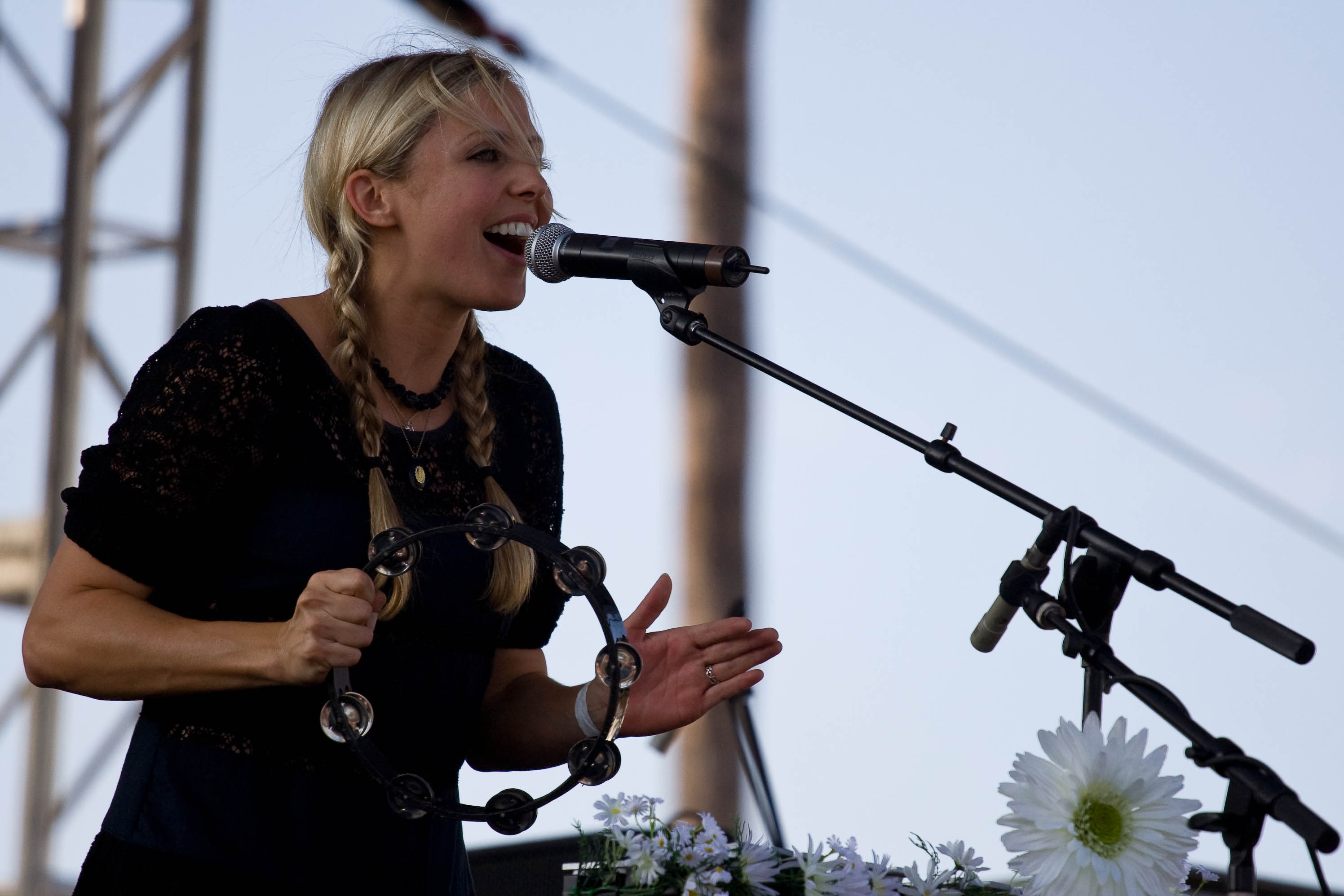
- Blake Hazard of the Submarines performing at Sunset Junction in Los Angeles in 2009

Background information
- Origin: Los Angeles, California, U.S.
- Genres: Indie rock, indie pop, electronica, trip hop
- Years active: 2006–present
- Labels: Nettwerk
- Members: John Dragonetti; Blake Hazard; Jason Stare; Scott Barber
- Website: TheSubmarines.com

The Submarines are an American indie rock band from Los Angeles formed in 2006. As of 2025, the band is on hiatus.

== Band history ==
Working as solo artists in Boston, the two members of the band, John Dragonetti and Blake Hazard, were introduced through a mutual friend, Joe Klompus. Dragonetti and Hazard formed a romantic and musical partnership, then took their show to Europe. The relationship lasted for four years, but ended in the fall of 2004 when the pair moved to L.A. After the break-up, both Hazard and Dragonetti continued writing songs, and because Hazard still recorded her music in Dragonetti's home studio, the pair quickly discovered the songs they had written were about each other and their sadness in having broken up. They decided to work on a few songs together and eventually got back together, and married. (The couple's marriage ended at some point and Hazard later married someone else.) The new songs were mastered for the couple as a wedding present, and those tracks eventually became their first album. Hazard has said of the relationship, "It’s hard, definitely hard. Luckily we are like-minded aesthetically and musically." Declare a New State!, The Submarines' first album was released in 2006 on the Nettwerk label.

== Blake Hazard ==
Blake Hazard is from Burlington, Vermont. Her full given name is Eleanor Blake Hazard, although she prefers her middle name and uses it as her first. She attended the Putney School in southern Vermont, southeast of her hometown. She then attended Sarah Lawrence College and then graduated from Harvard University. She is the great-granddaughter of American writer F. Scott Fitzgerald; Hazard's mother is Eleanor Anne Lanahan, whose mother is Frances Scott "Scottie" Fitzgerald, whose father is F. Scott Fitzgerald.

Blake released a solo album of her own titled "Little Airplane" (2002) just two years previous to her breakup with John on California's election night in 2004. "Little Airplane" was recorded by John in his studio and was released on Boston-based independent record label Kimchee Records. The album can still be obtained on Kimchee's website or through the Submarines web store. Hazard released two other solo albums, The Eleanor Islands (2013) and Possibilities at Sea (2017).

In 2018, Hazard married Stephen Brower, an Amazon Music executive. The couple was expecting a child as of summer 2025.

Also in 2018, Hazard began attending law school, and earned her JD degree in 2022.

As of 2025, Hazard is involved in managing F. Scott Fitzgerald's literary estate as the president of Fitzgerald Estate Limited.

Blake is an avid runner and has run numerous marathons and races for many causes. These marathons have taken place in Boston, Chicago, New York, and Los Angeles.

== John Dragonetti ==
John attended the American School of Dubai. Originally from Jackson, Michigan, his family moved to Dubai when he was young. Upon arriving in Boston, he briefly attended college at the Berklee School of Music.

To support himself, John worked as a bike messenger in the city of Boston and played in several Boston-area bands before going solo. Jack Drag was his moniker for music he recorded at his apartment home studio, which he called Space 67. Much of the recorded material was done on a 4-track cassette recorder. Several singles and a self-titled, full-length album, "The Red Record," or "cataloged as Pop Spelled Backwards" (as dubbed by his friends and bandmates) were released. The first single, "Velour," was released by Dave Gibbs (of the Gigolo Aunts), on his label called Sumerville Records. The second single was put out by John's record label, called Devil's Weed, Inc. A third single was released on Hepcat Records. As a result of these recordings, John was signed to A&M Records. When A&M was acquired by Universal Music, Jack Drag was dropped from the label and he continued recording independently in Space 67. Vowing to keep recording his music, he released more albums with Shifty Disco, Scientific Records and Sugar Free Records. This eventually led to a project with his old friend Peter DuCharme (AKA: Master Cylinder) called the Junior Communist Club. Several tracks left over from the Jack Drag A&M sessions were used for the project, and a few staple commercials resulted from the release. To this date, there have been no plans to release any new material by Jr. Communist Club. John has stated that "Although encouraged to, we never did put together a live show. I'm sure we'll collaborate again but whether it will be under the Jr.Commy moniker remains to be seen." As for his moniker Jack Drag, he states on the Jack Drag web site, "It's all about The Submarines now!"

== Band ==
Jason Stare and Scott Barber are part of the touring band. (As an inside joke, John has said that when the Subs play live with some computer tracks, the band is called The Robots). The Submarines have toured the United States and the world, sometimes as a duo, and sometimes as a full band. Many shows in the beginning, for the band's first tour, consisted of just Blake and John. For the band's second release, Honeysuckle Weeks, Jason joined to play drums for their live shows. Jason has been the band's live set drummer since the release of Honeysuckle Weeks, and is featured in Apple commercials for the iPhone 3G and iPhone 3GS. He is an artist, a college graduate and is from Long Island, New York. On bringing him on tour, John has stated, "I saw him live and I liked his playing. But seriously, just look at him. He looks cool!"

For the first leg of the 2011 Love Notes/Letter Bombs tour, The Submarines brought on Scott Barber to play Bass for live performances. Jason and Scott also have a side project together.

== Contributors ==
- Joe Klompus Bass - Declare a New State!
- Peter Adams - Wurli & Chamberlain on "The Good Night" on the Declare a New State! release

Peter also sits in on a Beatles cover "For No One" done in John's home studio in Eaglerock, CA in a home shot video recorded by The Voice Project. The video is on Vimeo and Peter plays organ for the song.

- David Michael Curry - Viola - Declare a New State!
- Jim Eno - Drums - Spoon

John traveled to Austin, Texas to work with Jim in his studio and contributed drum tracks for the Love Notes/Letter Bombs release. Jim's studio is called Public Hi-Fi and is based in Austin, Texas. The studio has a rare Neve 8036 Console (marked as #A41) with Uptown Automated Faders, 22 1064 mic/lin input modules and 2 1081 mic/line input modules in the board. The studio runs on both analog and digital. Which runs a Pro Tools HD2 system and a Studer 827 2" 24 track analog tape machine in the facility.

- The Section Quartet
- Jason Stare - Drums on "Anymore" - Love Notes/Letter Bombs

== 826LA ‘Chickens In Love’ compilation ==
In 2010, The Submarines donated their time and efforts to teach children of the 826LA Organization the art of songwriting and how to creatively express themselves. 826LA held a workshop titled "Songwriting With The Submarines". The results of the workshop were released as a compilation. The compilation includes Los Angeles local bands (She and Him, Cold War Kids, Fiona Apple and Dum Dum Girls among others) covering songs written by children in the Submarines' workshop. To celebrate the workshop and the children who participated in the songwriting. 826LA held a Mini Festival on March 6, 2010, which featured performances by The Submarines, The Happy Hollows and The Growlers.

== Awards ==
- Winner of the 9th Annual Independent Music Awards: Best Film/TV Song "You Me and the Bourgeoisie", used in Apple's iPhone 3GS ad.

== In popular media ==
- The songs "You, Me and the Bourgeoisie" and "Submarine Symphonika" were used in Apple commercials for the iPhone 3G and iPhone 3GS.
- The group's song "Xavia" was featured on the soundtrack for the film Nick and Norah's Infinite Playlist.
- In season four finale of Nip/Tuck, the song "Modern Inventions" was played during Gala Gallardo's operation and the song "Brighter Discontent" was lip-synced by the lead actors of the show.
- The duo recorded a cover version of "Little Boxes" for the second season of Weeds.
- "Brightest Hour" from Honeysuckle Weeks also appeared on Grey's Anatomy season 4, episode 14, "The Becoming" during a scene in which Derek asks Meredith whether or not she wants him to stay with her to watch a patient overnight rather than go home with Rose.
- "Wake Up Song" from Honeysuckle Weeks was featured in the second season of the CW series Gossip Girl.
- An instrumental version of "Modern Inventions" from the album Declare a New State! was used for the end credits of the 2007 documentary The Pixar Story. Portions of the album version of this song appear in the credits to episode 441 of This American Life, "When Patents Attack".
- The Submarines covered The Cure's "Boys Don't Cry" for American Laundromat Records tribute compilation Just Like Heaven - a tribute to The Cure.
- The Submarines covered The Jesus and Mary Chain's song "Just Like Honey" on their Love Notes/Letter Bombs release as a bonus track.
- Their song "Plans" appeared on Grey's Anatomy season 7, episode 16 episode "Not Responsible".
- The Submarines' song "Birds" was featured in the 2012 coming-of-age comedy-film LOL.
- John Dragonetti provides the original soundtrack for the documentary film We Are Legion.
- The Submarines' song "Tigers" was featured during the ending credits of the 2014 film Two Night Stand.
- In 2016, The Submarines' song "Brightest Hour" was featured in the first episode of the FX series Better Things.
- Their song "Maybe" was featured on the season two finale of The Good Place.

== Discography ==
=== Albums ===
- Declare a New State! (Nettwerk, 2006)
- Honeysuckle Weeks (Nettwerk, 2008)
- Love Notes/Letter Bombs (Nettwerk, 2011)

=== EPs ===
- Remix EP (Nettwerk, 2006)
- Shoelaces EP (Nettwerk, 2012)

=== Live ===
- Live Session (iTunes Exclusive, 2006)

=== Compilations ===
- For the Kids Three! Compilation (Nettwerk, 2007)
- Just Like Heaven - A Tribute to The Cure Compilation (American Laundromat, 2008)

=== Video ===
- The Submarines - Peace & Hate (Official Video) Declare a New State! (Nettwerk, 2006)
- The Submarines - Submarine Symphonika (Official Video) Honeysuckle Weeks (Nettwerk, 2008)
- The Submarines - You, Me, and the Bourgeoisie (Official Video) Honeysuckle Weeks (Nettwerk, 2008)
- The Submarines - Fire (Official Video) Love Notes/Letter Bombs (Nettwerk, 2011)
