= Honeysuckle Weeks (album) =

Studio album by The Submarines
- Released: April 15, 2008
- Genre: Indie pop
- Length: 34:29
- Label: Nettwerk

The Submarines chronology
Declare a New State! (2006)	Honeysuckle Weeks (2008)	Love Notes/Letter Bombs (2011)

Professional ratings
Review scores
Source	Rating
Allmusic	3.5/5 stars

Honeysuckle Weeks is the second full-length studio album by Indie pop band The Submarines. It was released through iTunes on April 15, 2008, and was released physically on May 13, 2008. The album was released through Canadian label Nettwerk.

== Background ==
The album was named after the actress, Blake Hazard told Indy Week's Chris Parker: "We mostly wrote and recorded the album over the course of last summer, so it was kind of the honeysuckle weeks, though it's actually the name of a British actress. We just saw her name in the credits one night from something we were watching and thought it was the most charming name ever. And it kind of reflects the summery feeling we were having".

An instrumental cut of "You, Me and the Bourgeoisie" is used in the worldwide commercials for Apple's iPhone 3G. Apple also used "Submarine Symphonika" in their iPhone 3GS commercials. "Submarine Symphonika" also uses audio from the Swedish Rhapsody numbers station, found on The Conet Project.

The song "Xavia" is also included on the soundtrack to the film Nick and Norah's Infinite Playlist. "Maybe" was used for the Season 2 finale of The Good Place.

== Track listing ==
No.	Title	Length
1.	"Submarine Symphonika"	3:59
2.	"The Thorny Thicket"	3:30
3.	"You Me and the Bourgeoise"	3:22
4.	"1940"	3:08
5.	"The Wake Up Song"	4:02
6.	"Swimming Pool"	3:18
7.	"Maybe"	3:22
8.	"Xavia"	4:31
9.	"Fern Beard"	2:49
10.	"Brightest Hour"	2:33

== Personnel ==
Musicians

- John Dragonetti – primary artist, engineer, mixing
- Blake Hazard – primary artist
- Daphne Chen – cello
- Richard Dodd – cello
- Eric Gorfain – arranger, violin

Production

- Paul DuGre – engineer
- Jeff Lipton – mastering
