= Johnny Harris (journalist) =

American YouTuber and filmmaker (born 1988)

- Born: May 28, 1988 (age 38); Oregon, U.S.
- Education: Brigham Young University (BA); American University (MA)
- Occupations: YouTuber; filmmaker; journalist
- Spouse: Iz Harris
- Children: 2

YouTube information
- Channel: Johnny Harris
- Years active: 2011–present
- Genres: International affairs; history; geography
- Subscribers: 7.59 million
- Views: 1.18 billion
- Last updated: March 20, 2026
- Website: www.johnnyharris.ch

Johnny Harris (born May 28, 1988) is an American YouTuber, filmmaker, and independent journalist based in Washington, D.C. He is known for producing the Borders series for the left-leaning news website Vox and for his personal YouTube channel. His work, which uses a fast-paced, visually-driven style to explain topics in history and international affairs, has drawn criticism for alleged oversimplification, factual inaccuracies, and conflicts of interest.

== Early life ==
Harris was raised as a member of the Church of Jesus Christ of Latter-day Saints in a small town in Oregon. He graduated from Ashland High School, in Ashland, Oregon. He served a two-year mission in Tijuana, Mexico, and identified as a devout Mormon but has since left the church. Harris holds a Bachelor of Arts in international relations and affairs from Brigham Young University (2013) and a Master of Arts in international peace and conflict resolution from American University (2016).

== Career ==
=== Vox and The New York Times ===
From 2017 to 2019, Harris produced and hosted Borders, a documentary short film series for Vox that profiled sociopolitical issues in various border regions worldwide. The series was twice nominated for an Emmy Award. It was cancelled in 2020 due to budgeting considerations.

Borders Series Overview
Season	Episodes	Originally aired			Location(s)
Season	Episodes	First aired	Last aired	Producer	Location(s)
1	6	May 22, 2017	October 14, 2017	Vox Media Inc.	Various
2	5	July 11, 2018	August 15, 2018	Vox Media Inc.	Hong Kong
3	5	November 22, 2018	December 18, 2018	Vox Media Inc.	Colombia
4	5	June 26, 2019	July 24, 2019	Vox Media Inc.	India
5	Release cancelled			Vox Media Inc.	United States

After leaving Vox, Harris produced several video essays for the Opinion section of The New York Times. In 2021, he was the video producer on an opinion piece titled "Blue States, You're the Problem", which won an Emmy Award.

=== Independent journalism and Newpress ===
In 2020, Harris created his personal YouTube channel, that continued the explanatory style of his previous work, covering topics such as international affairs, geography, and history. As of September 2026, his channel has 7.96 million subscribers.

Johnny Harris
(@johnnywharris)
tweeted:

Me and a group of creator journalists are building a corner of the internet for good faith, algorithm-free community discourse where the audience can contribute ideas and expertise to our journalism. It's old school internet, slow, human, transparent, and built for connection and understanding. Live today: Newpress

February 20, 2026

On February 20, 2026, Johnny and his wife Iz launched Newpress, an independent journalism company focused on video essays published on YouTube. Aside from Johnny's channel, Newpress features Search/Party by Sam Ellis, focusing on sports and geopolitics; Tunnel Vision by Christophe Haubursin, which looks into niche topics on the internet; and The Bigger Picture by Max Fisher, which tackles technology, geopolitics, and world news. Like Harris, Ellis, Haubursin, and Fisher had all worked at Vox. Newpress is primarily funded through video ads and sponsorships with a secondary revenue source based on a membership subscription model priced at $60 per year.

Johnny Harris and Newpress won the News Outstanding Graphic Design award at the 47th News and Documentary Emmy Awards in May 2026, making this Harris's second Emmy.

== Criticism ==
Harris's work has been criticized by journalists and science communicators for its journalistic standards, factual accuracy, and framing of complex issues.

Science communicator Jonathan Jarry of McGill University's Office for Science and Society criticized Harris for producing a video sponsored by the World Economic Forum (WEF) that was presented in a style indistinguishable from his journalistic content, with the partnership only disclosed at the end. Jarry argued the video's purpose was "neither education nor journalism, but an ad for the WEF's meeting in Davos and its founder’s latest book". Jarry has also criticized Harris's broader body of work for oversimplifying complex scientific and historical topics, misrepresenting facts, and omitting key context.

On December 15, 2024, a reporter for the Kyiv Independent criticized a video by Harris that attributed the Russo-Ukrainian war largely to NATO expansion. The reporter argued this viewpoint aligns with Kremlin propaganda, omits crucial historical context, and was an example of Harris's tendency toward "prioritizing sensationalism over facts and disregarding history", particularly regarding Russia and NATO.

== Personal life ==
Harris is married to Iz Harris, with whom he has two sons.
