= Turning Point: The Bomb and the Cold War =

2024 American nine-part docuseries

- Promotional poster
- Genre: Docu-series
- Directed by: Brian Knappenberger
- Composer: John Dragonetti
- Country of origin: United States
- Original languages: English; Ukrainian; Russian; German; Japanese; Mandarin; Lithuanian (Note: With some dialogue in Spanish and Polish)
- No. of seasons: 1
- No. of episodes: 9

Production
- Producers: Adam Kaplan; Alexandra Poolos; Sabrina Parke
- Cinematography: Jay Visit; Kassim Olivier Ahmed
- Editors: Bo Mehrad; Aaron Crozier; Christy Denes; Sean Jarrett; Michelle M. Witten; Mahdokht Mahmoudabadi
- Running time: 60-67 minutes
- Production company: Luminant Media

Original release
- Network: Netflix
- Release: March 12, 2024

Turning Point: The Bomb And The Cold War is a 2024 American nine-part docuseries created for Netflix and directed by Brian Knappenberger. It was released on March 12, 2024.

== Episodes ==
No. overall	No. in season	Title	Original release date
1	1	"The Sun Came Up Tremendous"	March 12, 2024
2	2	"Poisoning the Soil"	March 12, 2024
3	3	"Institutional Insanity"	March 12, 2024
4	4	"The Wall"	March 12, 2024
5	5	"War Games"	March 12, 2024
6	6	"Empire Is Untenable"	March 12, 2024
7	7	"The End of History"	March 12, 2024
8	8	"Moscow Will Not Be Silent"	March 12, 2024
9	9	"We Are Not Dead Yet"	March 12, 2024

== Reception ==
The review aggregation website Rotten Tomatoes reports that 100% of film and television critics' reviews were positive, based on 10 reviews, with an average rating of 7.0/10. Dan Einav of The Financial Times states, "Unlike Oppenheimer, the series looks beyond those who actively shaped seismic events to those helplessly caught in history." Ed Power of The Daily Telegraph calls it, "a nine-part documentary series about the Cold War uses Christopher Nolan’s Oscar-winning film as a convenient springboard."

Despite high scores on Rotten Tomatoes, Noah Rothman of the conservative American magazine National Review dubs it, "The Worst Cold War Documentary Ever Made".

== See also ==
- Turning Point: 9/11 and the War on Terror
- Turning Point: The Vietnam War
