= Web of Make Believe: Death, Lies and the Internet =

2022 Netflix docuseries

- Genre: Docuseries
- Created by: Brian Knappenberger
- Directed by: Brian Knappenberger
- No. of seasons: 1
- No. of episodes: 6

Production
- Running time: 60 minutes
- Production companies: Imagine Documentaries; Luminant Media

Original release
- Network: Netflix
- Release: 15 June 2022

Web of Make Believe: Death, Lies and the Internet is an anthology true crime docuseries, directed by Brian Knappenberger, released on Netflix on June 15, 2022. The series explores instances of digital misinformation and its consequences.

== Summary ==
Each episode presents an example of how the internet is used to cause harm and commit crimes. The people involved in the cases tell their struggles, mistakes and efforts to catch the perpetrators, and also how it affected their lives. After introducing the key characters in the case the episodes explain how the internet was used to commit the crimes.

== Episodes ==
Season	Episodes	Originally released
1	6	June 15, 2022

=== Season 1 (2021) ===
No. overall	No. in season	Title	Original release date
1	1	"Death by SWAT"	June 15, 2022
An online gamer makes a series of fraudulent 9-1-1 phone calls to lure police SWAT teams to innocent people's homes, known as swatting. Presented case: 2017 Wichita swatting in Wichita, Kansas
2	2	"A Murder in D.C."	June 15, 2022
The murder of a political staffer spawns several right-wing conspiracy theories. Presented case: Murder of Seth Rich in Washington, D.C.
3	3	"I'm Not a Nazi"	June 15, 2022
A woman tells the story of how she became a mouthpiece for white nationalist hate speech.
4	4	"Sextortion"	June 15, 2022
Several women recall their experiences of virtual blackmail, aimed at obtaining sensitive sexual material, known as sextortion.
5	5	"The Stingray, Part 1"	June 15, 2022
Two hackers revisit their tax fraud schemes that caught law enforcement's attention.
6	6	"The Stingray, Part 2"	June 15, 2022
The FBI hunts the hacker, but he quickly turns the tables by contesting the legitimacy of a crucial instrument in their investigation, the Stingray phone tracker. Presented case: Daniel Rigmaiden tax fraud

== Reception ==
On the review aggregation website Rotten Tomatoes, the series holds an 83% "Fresh" rating with an average rating of 6 out of 10 based on 6 reviews.
