= Turning Point: 9/11 and the War on Terror =

2021 American documentary

- Promotional poster
- Genre: Docu-series
- Directed by: Brian Knappenberger
- Composer: John Dragonetti
- Country of origin: United States
- Original languages: English; Dari; Pashto; Urdu
- No. of seasons: 1
- No. of episodes: 5

Production
- Producers: Jennifer Jo Janisch; Sabrina Parke; Erikka Yancy
- Cinematography: Axel Baumann; Jay Visit
- Editors: Brian Anton; Aaron Crozier; Christy Denes; Sean Jarrett; Greg O'Toole
- Running time: 60-67 minutes
- Production company: Luminant Media

Original release
- Network: Netflix
- Release: September 1, 2021

Turning Point: 9/11 and the War on Terror is a 2021 American five-part docuseries created for Netflix and directed by Brian Knappenberger. It was produced by Luminant Media. The series documents the terrorist attacks that occurred on September 11, 2001 in New York City's Lower Manhattan, as well as the events that took place both in Afghanistan and the United States, which led to the attacks. It was released on September 1, 2021.

== Episodes ==
No. overall	No. in season	Title	Original release date
1	1	"The System Was Blinking Red"	September 1, 2021
On September 11, 2001, the two airplanes (Flight AA 11 and Flight UA 175) crashed at the Twin Towers, shocking the citizens. The episode then traces back to the Cold War era in 1979 when the Soviets invaded Afghanistan. President Ronald Reagan and CIA director William J. Casey sent out troops to Afghanistan to fight against the Soviets and support the weapon supplies to the Mujahideen. Mujahideen formed a militant Islamic and Jihadist group to oppose the Soviet Union. The Mujahideens then began competing with each other to form a fundamentalist group, including Gulbuddin Hekmatyar, who was criticized for his dictatorship. In 1988, a group of young arabs and muslims from separate countries joined the Sunni Jihadist group, forming what was now known as Al-Qaeda, founded by their leader Osama bin Laden. After the Soviets withdrew from Afghanistan in 1989, Osama bin Laden began to view the United States as a major threat to the muslim community after the American troops entered Saudi Arabia to fight against Saddam Hussein's invasion of Kuwait in 1990. In 1993, the Islamic terrorists who were influenced by Omar Abdel-Rahman set the bombing on the World Trade Center, which made the Towers a prime target for Khalid Sheik Mohammed. After the CIA investigated the Jihadist threats, Osama bin Laden settled in Sudan and was then sent to Afghanistan in 1996 after he declared war on the United States. In 1998, Al-Qaeda began committing multiple terrorist attacks and suicide bombings in East Africa and Yemen to retaliate against the United States, which made Osama bin Laden the FBI's most wanted man. The Al-Qaeda members secretly enter the US undetected, which then sets the center stage for the 9/11 attacks in 2001.
2	2	"A Place of Danger"	September 1, 2021
The episode starts with the incident of Flight 77 crashing at The Pentagon. Nine minutes before the incident, the air traffic controller tried to contact Flight 93. Still, the hijackers took over the plane and planned to attack the White House, causing mass panic and evacuation in Washington, D.C.. Passengers on Flight 93 successfully sabotaged the hijackers' plan, resulting in the plane crash near Shanksville. Returning to New York City, the Twin Towers suddenly collapsed after the plane crash, engulfing the city with smoke and debris. The episode then focuses on President George W. Bush's response to the Twin Towers attack. After attending his meeting at an elementary school, President Bush receives calls from Vice President Dick Cheney about the incident. Instead, President Bush remained secluded on Air Force One to visit several Air Force bases before reaching the Oval Office. The Bush Administration found out that it was Al-Qaeda who orchestrated the attacks and planned to declare war against them. On September 18, 2001, the US Congress enacted the AUMF, a Joint Resolution that allowed the President to authorize the military against terrorism in response to the attack. Determined to fight against the Taliban regime and capture Osama Bin Laden, the US military moved to Afghanistan, forming a coalition with the Northern Alliance following the assassination of Ahmad Shah Massoud. The coalition succeeded in recapturing territories, but Osama Bin Laden quickly fled from Afghanistan soon after. Thus, the war on terror has officially begun.
3	3	"The Dark Side"	September 1, 2021
The episode starts with the aftermath of the 9/11 attack, where firefighters and police authorities began searching for survivors who were buried in the rubble. In contrast, several firefighters and police officers who were involved in the 9/11 attacks were killed. The episode focused on the FBI investigation of the perpetrators who instigated the 9/11 attacks. The FBI revealed the identities of five hijackers who took over Flight 77. The two hijackers, Khalid al-Mihdhar and Nawaf al-Hazmi, are members of Al-Qaeda sent by Bin Laden to participate in the "Plane Operation." With Khalid Sheik Mohammad as Al-Qaeda's plot architect, the hijackers had attended a meeting with him in Kuala Lumpur in 2000 before departing for the United States. The CIA revealed that the hijackers had used forged visas to enter the United States. On January 15, 2000, al-Mihdhar and al-Hazmi settled in San Diego upon meeting with Anwar al-Awlaki as they secretly became the muscle hijackers. With Zacarias Moussaoui arrested for his failed hijacking, the FBI authorities were unaware of Ramzi Bin Al-Shibh's and Mohammed Atta's established coordination of attacks with leadership skills. The authorities concluded that the Al-Qaeda hijackers had planned a coordinated attack. The episode then focuses on the US authoritarian changes that followed the 9/11 attacks. In January 2002, the US Pentagon constructed the Guantanamo Bay Prison in Cuba for detainees who were arrested for terrorist acts based on the Geneva Convention, which sparked a global controversy for its inhumane acts of torture, interrogation, and imprisonment. In contrast, the FBI authorities used the enhanced interrogation technique on Abu Zubaydah, who confessed to Khalid Sheik Mohammed's involvement. The US Department of Justice sends the guidance to the CIA for interrogation techniques, with President Bush authorizing them. However, the CIA Inspector General concluded that the program remains unresolved, with no evidence of terrorist prevention. On October 26, 2001, President Bush signed the controversial Patriot Act that targets the Muslim community who are suspected of terrorism. The Bush Administration and the National Security Agency began establishing the confidential Stellar Wind program for surveillance on metadata collection, which violates the Fourth Amendment. In March 2004, Jack Goldsmith decided to discontinue the Stellar Wind program, which caused an argument with the Bush Administration. The councils and legal scholars visit the district attorney, John Ashcroft, at the hospital to sign the document for renewing the program. In 2006, the surveillance program was leaked by whistleblowers, and Barack Obama and his administration continued to support the surveillance. Interviewers express how post 9/11 events affected the administration's ethics on establishing policies out of fear and paranoia.
4	4	"The Good War"	September 1, 2021
5	5	"Graveyard of Empires"	September 1, 2021

== Reception ==
The review aggregation website Rotten Tomatoes reports that the series has an approval rating of 83%, based on reviews from 6 critics. On Metacritic it has a score of 74 out of 100 based on reviews from 6 critics, indicating "generally favorable reviews".

James M. Lindsay and Anna Shortridge place this on a list of seven documentaries recommendations on 9/11 for the Council on Foreign Relations. Azad Essa criticised the docuseries in the Middle East Eye for its "orientalist" view of Muslims.

== See also ==
- Turning Point: The Bomb and the Cold War
- Turning Point: The Vietnam War
