= Love Notes/Letter Bombs =

Studio album by The Submarines
- Released: April 5, 2011
- Genre: Indie pop
- Length: 39:18
- Label: Nettwerk

The Submarines chronology
Honeysuckle Weeks (album) (2008)	Love Notes/Letter Bombs (2011)

Professional ratings
Review scores
Source	Rating
Allmusic	3/5 stars
Paste	8.1/10 link
Prefix	7.5/10 link

Love Notes/Letter Bombs is the third full-length studio album by Indie pop band The Submarines. It was released on April 5, 2011, through the Canadian label Nettwerk.

== Recording ==
Hazard and Dragonetti used a much more collaborative approach to writing and recording Love Notes/Letter Bombs than they have used for past albums. In an interview with The Vinyl District, Dragonetti notes: "The first thing we really wanted to do when working on this record is involve other people more. We definitely wanted to make something a little more aggressive sounding, something we enjoyed playing live a little more. We had this guy John O’Mahony mix it, and he did the Metric record Fantasies, and sonically that really impressed us. We recorded it out in Los Angeles at The Sound Factory."

The duo also worked more closely during the writing process, with Dragonetti saying, "We usually kind of work on ideas separately and then bring it together, which we did on this record, but we also plopped ourselves in a room, which was a bit more challenging."

== Track listing ==
No.	Title	Length
1.	"Shoelaces"	3:10
2.	"Fire"	4:23
3.	"Ivaloo"	4:18
4.	"The Sun Shines at Night"	3:08
5.	"Birds"	4:21
6.	"Tigers"	4:59
7.	"Where You Are"	3:42
8.	"Plans"	3:19
9.	"A Satellite, Stars and an Ocean Behind You"	3:51
10.	"Anymore"	4:07

== Personnel ==
Musicians

- John Dragonetti - Composer, Engineer
- Blake Hazard - Composer, Engineer, Photography
- Jim Eno - Drums, Engineer
- Jason Stare - Drums
- The Section Quartet - Strings

Production

- John O'Mahony - Mixing
- Jeff Lipton - Mastering
