= Nobody Speak: Trials of the Free Press =

2017 documentary film by Brian Knappenberger

- Directed by: Brian Knappenberger
- Produced by: Brian Knappenberger; Femke Wolting; Korelan Matteson
- Edited by: Andrew Mcallister
- Music by: Garron Chang
- Production companies: Netflix; First Look Media
- Release date: 23 June 2017 (Netflix)
- Running time: 95 minutes

Nobody Speak: Trials of the Free Press is a 2017 Netflix documentary directed by Brian Knappenberger. The documentary is themed around the effects of big money on American journalism. The documentary focuses on two incidents: Peter Thiel financing wrestler Hulk Hogan's lawsuit against Gawker Media, and casino owner Sheldon Adelson's secret purchase of the Las Vegas Review-Journal.

== Synopsis ==
The film starts with the legal proceedings of professional wrestler Hulk Hogan, who (with the financial backing of billionaire Peter Thiel) had filed a lawsuit, Bollea v. Gawker, against Gawker Media, seeking $100 million in damages for releasing a sex tape featuring him and Heather Clem. Gawker Media subsequently filed for Chapter 11 bankruptcy, as a direct result of the lawsuit. Thiel had reportedly wanted to bring Gawker down for having published an article nine years earlier which outed him as gay.

The film then covers an incident where casino mogul Sheldon Adelson bought the Las Vegas Review-Journal, while keeping his identity as the buyer a secret, even to the journalists employed by the company. The management also did not reveal the new owner of the company to the employees, and denied that the Adelson family was involved when asked about the possibility. Adelson himself had also denied his ownership in an interview with CNN. This caused a couple of its journalists to start investigating it on their own by calling their contacts. They eventually uncovered that Sheldon Adelson was indeed the new owner, and after publishing an article with the revelation, were forced to step down.

== Reception ==
Nobody Speak has mostly been well received by critics. It holds an 89% fresh score on Rotten Tomatoes with an average rating of 6.8/10 based on 23 reviews. The film has a score of 69 on Metacritic, indicating generally favourable reviews.
