= The Trials of Gabriel Fernandez =

2020 American documentary television series

- Genre: True crime, Documentary
- Directed by: Brian Knappenberger
- Country of origin: United States
- No. of seasons: 1
- No. of episodes: 6

Production
- Production companies: Luminant Media; Common Sense Media

Original release
- Network: Netflix
- Release: February 26, 2020

The Trials of Gabriel Fernandez is a 2020 American true crime documentary television series about the 2013 murder and abuse of Gabriel Fernandez, an eight-year-old boy from Palmdale, California. It was released on Netflix as a six-part miniseries on February 26, 2020.

== Cast ==
- Rodrigo Alfonso as Arturo Martinez
- William Guirola as Isauro Aguirre

== Background ==
Directed by documentary filmmaker Brian Knappenberger, the series is co-produced by his production company, Luminant Media, and Common Sense Media. The series features interviews with Los Angeles Times journalists, attorneys Jon Hatami and Scott Andrew Yang, Los Angeles County District Attorney Jackie Lacey, and others.

Knappenberger has stated that, during the two years of production on the series, producers kept a therapist on call because of the disturbing nature of the content.

== Critical response ==
The Trials of Gabriel Fernandez has received generally positive reviews from critics. Writing for CNN.com, Brian Lowry called the series "compelling but structurally messy". Writing for Decider, Joel Keller called the series "a must-watch".

== See also ==
- List of Netflix original programming
