= Dylan Gardner =

- Born: Dylan Michael Gardner; June 27, 1996 (age 29); Aurora, IL, U.S.
- Origin: Arizona Virtual Academy
- Genres: Pop, rock
- Occupations: Musician, singer-songwriter, record producer
- Instruments: Vocals, guitar, piano, drums, bass
- Years active: 2012–present
- Label: Warner Bros. Records
- Website: dylangardner.com

Dylan Gardner (born June 27, 1996) is an American singer-songwriter, producer, and musician from Plainfield, IL.

He has released two albums, Adventures in Real Time (2014), and Almost Real (2018). Adventures in Real Time was reissued by Warner Bros. Records in 2014 after the lead single "Let's Get Started" racked up over 10 million Spotify plays. He has also toured nationally, headlining and opening for Emily Kinney during her 2015 summer tour. He also performed at SXSW in 2015. He released his second full-length album Almost Real in April 2018. In late 2019, Gardner formed the psychedelic rock band Communicant. Communicant released their debut album Sun Goes Out to critical acclaim in 2021.

== Early life ==
Gardner was born in Aurora, Illinois and raised in Plainfield. He comes from a musical family with his father being the bassist of the 1980s pop group The Kind, as well as owning Naperville Music, a music store in Illinois that sells and rents instruments. His brother Mark Gardner is a drummer who played on Gardner's album Adventures in Real Time. Gardner began by playing the drums, eventually picking up piano and then guitar. He attributes his guitar playing to Jimmy Page and his love for the piano to Elton John. Spending most of his time at record stores at a young age, Gardner found an obsession in record collecting. Gardner moved to Arizona in 2010.

== Career ==
After moving to Arizona, Gardner built a recording studio in his bedroom, using his closet as a vocal booth. He purchased a Baldwin piano at a Goodwill store and used equipment such as a laptop, MIDI keyboard, and drum machine to record his music.

Prior to the release of his first full-length album, Gardner paid tribute to The Beatles on the anniversary of their breakup (April 10, 1970). In April 2014 he recorded 15-second clips of Side 2 of Abbey Road and released the clips on Instagram, Twitter, and YouTube. The tribute reached over 6.7 million viewers and was dubbed #DylanBrokeUpTheBeatles.

Gardner released his debut album in 2014 at the age of 17. Titled Adventures in Real Time, the album was compiled from over 100 songs that were written and recorded by Gardner. The album was co-produced by John Dragonetti, mixed by Michael Brauer, and recorded by Gardner in his bedroom. The album was recorded during the summer of 2013 with the final cut worked by Dragonetti for additional input and instrumentation. He released the lead-off track from the album on Spotify in 2014. Titled Let's Get Started, the song reached more than 10 million plays.

Gardner also opened for Emily Kinney during her 2015 summer tour, playing 31 concerts in cities throughout the United States. He also performed at SXSW in 2015.

Gardner began work on his next album, releasing the early single "Sign Language" in November 2016. He teamed up with producer Matt Rad and songwriters Teddy Geiger, John Ryan, and Julian Bunetta for the new material. In April 2018, he released his second full-length album, Almost Real which he co-produced and created the illustrations for the album package.

In 2019, Gardner was out of his Warner Bros. contract and formed the band Communicant with the intention of being true to his inspirations. Communicant released their EP Memory Palace in 2020. The band then released their debut album Sun Goes Out in 2021 to critical acclaim.

== Discography ==
=== Albums ===
Title	Details
Adventures in Real Time	Released: 2014; Label: Bingo Masters Records, reissued by Warner Bros. Records; Format: Digital download, CD, Vinyl
Almost Real	Released: 2018; Label: Bingo Masters Records; Format: Digital download, Vinyl

=== EPs ===
Title	Details
Morning Stories	Released: 2012; Label: Independent; Format: Digital download, CD
