= Turning Point: The Vietnam War =

2025 American documentary series

- Genre: Docu-series
- Directed by: Brian Knappenberger
- Composer: John Dragonetti
- Country of origin: United States
- Original languages: English; Vietnamese
- No. of seasons: 1
- No. of episodes: 5

Production
- Producers: Doan Hoàng Curtis; Bo Kovitz; Keren McAlester; Tommy Nguyen
- Cinematography: Jay Visit
- Editors: Christy Denes; Sean Jarrett; Mark Imgrund; Andrew McAllister; Michelle M. Witten; Darshan Kembhavi
- Running time: 72-84 minutes
- Production company: Luminant Media

Original release
- Network: Netflix
- Release: April 30, 2025

Turning Point: The Vietnam War is a 2025 American five-part docuseries created for Netflix, directed by Brian Knappenberger, and produced by Luminant Media. It documents the start, progress, and end of the Vietnam War, and its impact on those involved. The series was released on April 30, 2025, marking the 50th anniversary of the Fall of Saigon.

The series includes interviews with journalists Peter Arnett, Dan Rather, and Peter Osnos, war veterans C. Jack Ellis and Scott Camil, and singer Graham Nash, amongst others.

== Episodes ==
No. overall	No. in season	Title	Original release date
1	1	"America Goes To War"	April 30, 2025
2	2	"Civil War"	April 30, 2025
3	3	"Life Is Cheap"	April 30, 2025
4	4	"Why Are We Even Here?"	April 30, 2025
5	5	"The End of the Road"	April 30, 2025

== Reception ==
On the review aggregation website Rotten Tomatoes, the series has an approval rating of 100%, based on reviews from five critics. On Metacritic, it has a score of 75 out of 100 based on reviews from four critics, indicating "generally favorable reviews".

Bob Strauss, writing for San Francisco Chronicle, notes that though the series is packed with facts, it still delivers the message and "gets the job done". In addition, Melanie McFarland notes in our review for Salon.com that the "brutally candid" interviews with the persons involved in the war "take center stage". In his Stream it or Skip it review for Decider, Joel Keller commends the series as Stream it.

== See also ==
- Turning Point: 9/11 and the War on Terror
- Turning Point: The Bomb and the Cold War
