= Vote, Virginia =

Unincorporated community in Virginia, United States

Coordinates: 36°55′59″N 77°56′24″W

Vote is an unincorporated community located in Brunswick County, in the U.S. state of Virginia.
