= Voter (disambiguation) =

A voter is someone who votes in an election.

Voter may also refer to:

- Voter (film), a 2019 Indian Telugu film
- Voter (horse), a Thoroughbred racehorse bred in England that raced in the United States
- The Voter (short story), by Chinua Achebe
- The Voter (film), an upcoming Indian Malayalam film

== Other uses ==
- Votër, the domestic hearth in Albanian folklore
