= Oklahoma City Bombing: American Terror =

Documentary about the Oklahoma City bombing

- Promotional poster
- Directed by: Greg Tillman
- Produced by: Tiller Russell; Brian Lovett; Jeff Hasler
- Edited by: Rogelio González-Abraldes; Nate Gross; Rick Milewski
- Music by: Pedro Bromfman; Juan Carlos Enriquez
- Distributed by: Netflix
- Release date: April 18, 2025
- Running time: 84 minutes
- Country: United States
- Language: English

Oklahoma City Bombing: American Terror is a 2025 Netflix true crime documentary film directed by Greg Tillman, released to mark the 30th anniversary of the 1995 bombing of the Alfred P. Murrah Federal Building — the deadliest act of domestic terrorism in U.S. history.

== Synopsis ==
The film combines archival footage, survivor accounts, and law enforcement interviews to recount the attack that killed 168 people, including 19 children. It explores Timothy McVeigh's radicalization, which was influenced by the FBI’s handling of the 1993 Waco siege and the extremist novel The Turner Diaries. The documentary features previously unreleased prison interviews with McVeigh, revealing his lack of remorse, and personal stories from survivors like Amy Downs and Renee Moore.
