= Jeremy Diamond =

American journalist

- Born: 15 January 1993 (age 33)
- Education: The George Washington University (BA)
- Occupation: CNN Correspondent in Israel
- Website: https://www.cnn.com/profiles/jeremy-diamond

Jeremy Diamond (born 15 January 1993 in New York) is a French-American journalist who reports for CNN from Jerusalem. He was previously the White House correspondent for CNN.

== Early life ==
Jeremy Diamond was born on January 15, 1993, in New York. Diamond attended the French American School of New York from the age of three through his graduation from high school in 2011 where he worked at the school newspaper. In December 2014, he graduated cum laude with a B.A. in international affairs from George Washington University.

At George Washington, he worked as the news editor at The GW Hatchet and wrote a story uncovering the misrepresentation of the university's financial aid policy by officials, winning the Institute on Political Journalism's Collegiate Journalism Award and a Pinnacle Award from the College Media Association.

== Career ==
=== Early career ===
After school, he worked as an intern at CNN before becoming a reporter in September 2014. He worked as a White House correspondent until the summer of 2024.

He covered the election campaign and presidency of Donald Trump, closely following his rise from the start of his presidential campaign to the elections. He covered Trump's policy on North Korea and focused on concerns about COVID-19 misinformation in 2020. He has reported on the Biden administration's response to the COVID-19 pandemic and Kamala Harris's handling of immigration.

=== 2023–present: Israel and Palestine ===
Diamond started reporting from Israel two days after the 2023 October 7 attacks, covering the Gaza war and the hostage crisis, the West Bank and Israeli settler violence. In June 2024, Diamond was named the network's Jerusalem-based international correspondent.

Diamond has advocated without success for journalists to be allowed to enter the Gaza Strip without being embedded with the Israel Defense Forces (IDF) so that they can report independently. Diamond has reported as an embedded journalist with the IDF, allowing him to survey destroyed neighborhoods and tour the tunnels where Israeli hostages allegedly were held. Like all journalists, the IDF has denied him the freedom to meet or speak with Palestinians in Gaza, or to verify any assertions made by Hamas or the IDF in Gaza.

On 13 July 2025, as Diamond was covering the killing of Sayfollah Musallet in the West Bank, he and his crew were attacked by a group of Israeli settlers in Sinjil. He reported that the back window of his team's vehicle had been shattered, although they were all able to escape unharmed.

In March 2026, Diamond and his crew were assaulted and detained by reservists from the Netzah Yehuda Battalion while they were reporting from the West Bank village of Tayasir. The IDF subsequently suspended the battalion's operational activities, apologized to CNN and promised to investigate the incident. Nagham Zbeedat of Haaretz noted the inconsistency in the IDF's responses to the attack on Diamond and his crew and the killing of the Bani Odeh family by IDF soldiers, and stated, "What has long been routine for Palestinians is now visible to an international audience, echoing the treatment Palestinians face daily, whether they are holding cameras or not."

That July, Diamond and his CNN crew were again attacked by Israeli settlers in Sinjil. Four settlers were subsequently detained by Israeli police. The police later announced that charges had been filed against a man from Jerusalem over the incident, which The Times of Israel noted was a rare occurrence.

== Personal life ==
Born in New York to a French mother, Diamond has citizenship in the U.S. and France. He is fluent in French and conversational in Spanish and Hebrew. He was formerly romantically linked to NBC political correspondent Ali Vitali.
