= Brian Knappenberger =

American documentary filmmaker

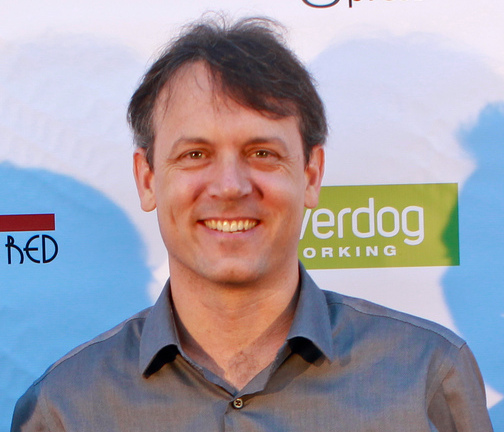
Brian Knappenberger in 2012

Brian Knappenberger is an American documentary filmmaker, known for The Internet's Own Boy: The Story of Aaron Swartz, We Are Legion: The Story of the Hacktivists, Turning Point: 9/11 and the War on Terror, and his work on Bloomberg Game Changers.

== Works ==
The documentary film We Are Legion (2012) was written and directed by Knappenberger. It is about the workings and beliefs of the self-described hacktivist collective Anonymous.

In June 2014, The Internet's Own Boy: The Story of Aaron Swartz was released. The film is about the life of internet activist Aaron Swartz. The film was on the short list for the 2015 Academy Award for best documentary feature.

Nobody Speak: Trials of the Free Press was released on Netflix in June 2017, after debuting at the Sundance Film Festival. It follows professional wrestler Hulk Hogan's lawsuit against Gawker Media, and the takeover of the Las Vegas Review-Journal by casino owner Sheldon Adelson.

On January 22, 2016, "investigative docuseries" Truth and Power premiered on Pivot, executive produced by Knappenberger and narrated by Maggie Gyllenhaal.

In 2020, Knappenberger directed true crime documentary The Trials of Gabriel Fernandez, a television series about the 2013 Murder of Gabriel Fernandez, an eight-year-old boy from Palmdale, California.

Knappenberger has directed and executive produced numerous other documentaries for the Discovery Channel, Bloomberg, and PBS, including PBS' Ice Warriors: USA Sled Hockey. He owns and operates Luminant Media, a Los Angeles–based production and post-production company.

In 2024, Knappenberger directed the documentary Turning Point: The Bomb and the Cold War on Netflix, a series about the lead up to the 2022 Russian invasion of Ukraine, as well as the Cold War.

In 2025, Knappenberger directed and executive produced Turning Point: The Vietnam War, a five-part docuseries and the third installment of Netflix's Turning Point docuseries, released on the 50th anniversary of the Fall of Saigon.

== See also ==
- Web of Make Believe: Death, Lies and the Internet – 2022 Netflix docuseries
