= The Internet's Own Boy =

The Internet's Own Boy: The Story of Aaron Swartz
- Sundance film poster
- Directed by: Brian Knappenberger
- Written by: Brian Knappenberger
- Produced by: Brian Knappenberger
- Cinematography: Brian Knappenberger; Scott Sinkler; Lincoln Else
- Edited by: Jason Decker; Brian Knappenberger; Andy Robertson; Bryan Storkel; Michelle M. Witten
- Music by: John Dragonetti
- Production companies: Luminant Media; Unjustsus Films
- Distributed by: Participant Media; FilmBuff
- Release dates: January 20, 2014 (Sundance); June 27, 2014 (United States)
- Running time: 105 minutes
- Country: United States
- Language: English
- Box office: $48,911

The Internet's Own Boy: The Story of Aaron Swartz is a 2014 American biographical documentary film about Aaron Swartz written, directed, and produced by Brian Knappenberger. The film premiered in the US Documentary Competition program category at the 2014 Sundance Film Festival on January 20, 2014.

After its premiere at Sundance, Participant Media and FilmBuff acquired distribution rights of the film. The film was released to theatres and VOD on June 27, 2014, in United States. It was followed by a broadcast television premiere on Participant's network Pivot in late 2014.

The film also played at the 2014 SXSW on March 15, 2014. It served as the opening film at the 2014 Hot Docs Canadian International Documentary Festival on April 24, 2014.

The film's UK premiere took place at Sheffield Doc/Fest in June 2014 and won the Sheffield Youth Jury Award that year. In August 2014, the film was screened at the Barbican Centre in London as part of Wikimania 2014. The BBC also aired the film in January 2015 as part of its Storyville documentary brand. It was also released on the Internet with a Creative Commons BY-NC-SA 4.0 license.

== Synopsis ==
The film depicts the life of American computer programmer, writer, political organizer, and Internet activist Aaron Swartz. Footage of Swartz as a child is featured at the start and end of the film. The film is narrated by figures from Swartz's life, including his parents, brothers, girlfriends, and co-workers.

== Reception ==
The film received positive response from critics. Review aggregator Rotten Tomatoes gives the film a 93% rating based on reviews from 57 critics, with an average score of 7.3/10.

Geoffrey Berkshire in his review for Variety described it as "A spellbinding portrait of the Internet whiz kid's life and political convictions, which were cut short by his suicide in early 2013." John DeFore of The Hollywood Reporter gave the film a positive review and said that it was an "Excellent newbie-friendly account of a story that rocked the Web's cognoscenti." Katherine Kilkenny from Indiewire said that "The Internet's Own Boy aspires to provoke Capitol Hill by educating its viewers to inspire questions. Questions for those revered leaders in Silicon Valley – and for a government whose restrictions of the internet have been applied with a sledgehammer, as one source of the film says, instead of a scalpel." In her review for The Daily Telegraph, Amber Wilkinson gave the film three stars out of five and said that "Knappenberger's film is a heavy watch, mostly using talking heads and footage of Swartz before his death to tell a story which comes to question the state of civil liberties in the US."

In December 2014 the film was listed among 15 films on a "short list" to advance to a round of voting for Documentary Feature in the 87th Academy Awards, however it did not advance to a nomination. The film later won the award for Best Documentary Screenplay from the Writers Guild of America.

== See also ==
- Citizenfour – 2014 documentary film about government surveillance documents disclosed by Edward Snowden
- Good Copy Bad Copy – 2007 documentary film about copyright and culture in the context of the Internet
- RiP!: A Remix Manifesto – 2008 documentary about the evolution of the concept of copyright
- Steal This Film – 2006 film series about the movement against intellectual property featuring Aaron Swartz as an interviewee
