= Fredricka Whitfield =

American journalist and news anchor

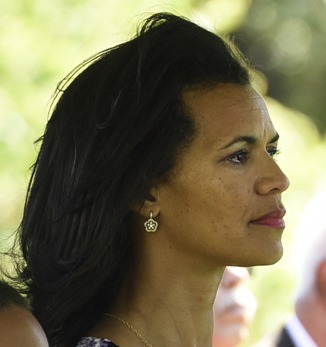
- Fredricka Whitfield in 2015
- Born: May 31, 1965 (age 60); Burtonsville, Maryland, U.S.
- Education: Howard University (BA)
- Occupation: Journalist
- Notable credit: CNN
- Spouse: John Glenn (m. 1999)
- Children: 3

Fredricka Whitfield (born May 31, 1965) is an American journalist and news anchor. She anchors the weekend edition of CNN Newsroom from CNN's world headquarters in Atlanta, and she is also a fill-in and substitute anchor for CNN's At This Hour With Kate Bolduan.

== Early life and education ==
Whitfield is the daughter of American middle-distance runner and Olympian Mal Whitfield. Whitfield attended Paint Branch High School in Burtonsville, Maryland, graduating in 1983. She earned a bachelor's degree in journalism from Howard University's School of Communications in 1987. While attending Howard, she served as a news anchor for campus radio station WHUR. In 2002, Whitfield was selected as the Howard University School of Communications Alumna of the year.

== Career ==
After college, Whitfield worked at WPLG-TV in Miami, NewsChannel 8 in Washington, D.C., KTVT-TV in Fort Worth, WTNH in New Haven, Connecticut, and WCIV in Charleston, South Carolina. Then she became a correspondent for NBC News, serving as an Atlanta-based correspondent for NBC Nightly News from 1995 to 2001. She worked for other news programs at NBC including Today; she was a morning and afternoon anchor as well as an assignment reporter.

Whitfield joined CNN in 2002 and has covered several major stories. She was the first anchor to break the news of the death of Ronald Reagan. She has reported the devastating 2004 Indian Ocean earthquake and tsunami. Whitfield also reported from the Persian Gulf region during Operation Iraqi Freedom. She was also the first CNN anchor to break the news of the death of Kobe Bryant in 2020.

=== Controversies ===
In 2014, Whitfield's televised interview with comedian Joan Rivers to discuss her new book of comedy came to an abrupt end after Whitfield commented that Rivers' work on the Fashion Police shows and Casey Anthony jokes were mean-spirited, in addition to criticizing her for wearing a vintage fur despite Whitfield's wearing of animal leather. Whitfield acknowledged the controversy during a subsequent broadcast, calling her segment with Rivers "one of the most talked about interviews ending abruptly with an exit".

On June 13, 2015, Whitfield described the gunman who attacked police in Dallas, Texas, as "courageous and brave" on air, when she thought he might be part of a coordinated terrorist attack. The next day she claimed she misspoke but made no formal apology for the initial statement. The following day, Whitfield issued a formal on-air apology, saying she terribly misused those words and was sincerely sorry.

== Personal life ==
Whitfield has been married to John Glenn, the director of photography at The Atlanta Journal-Constitution, since 1999. She gave birth to a son in January 2005, and a set of fraternal twins, daughter Nola and son Gilbert, in November 2012.
