= Declare a New State! =

Studio album by The Submarines
- Released: 14 March 2006
- Genre: Indie pop
- Label: Nettwerk

The Submarines chronology
Declare a New State! (2006)	"Live Session (iTunes Exclusive) - EP" (2006)

Professional ratings
Review scores
Source	Rating
Allmusic	link
Glide Magazine	link
IGN	(6.3/10) link

Declare a New State! is the debut studio album by American Indie pop band the Submarines. It was released on March 14, 2006, on the Canadian Nettwerk label. The album was mastered by a friend, Jeff Lipton of Peerless Mastering, as a wedding present for band members John Dragonetti and Blake Hazard. "Modern Inventions" was used in the ending credits of the short-lived MTV series, Good Vibes, as well as the Pixar documentary The Pixar Story (the latter using an instrumental version).

== Track listing ==
No.	Title	Length
1.	"Peace and Hate"	3:17
2.	"Clouds"	3:38
3.	"Vote"	4:37
4.	"Brighter Discontent"	4:28
5.	"Hope"	3:54
6.	"Ready or Not"	4:01
7.	"Modern Inventions"	2:32
8.	"The Good Night"	4:02
9.	"The Conversation"	2:48
10.	"Darkest Things"	5:10

== Personnel ==
- John Dragonetti - Composer, Engineer
- Blake Hazard - Composer
- Peter Bradley Adams – Wurlitzer
- David Michael Curry – Viola
- Joe Klompus – Bass Guitar
- Jeff Lipton – Mastering Engineer
