= Black Snow (2024 film) =

Black Snow is a 2024 documentary film that follows Natalia Zubkova, a Siberian woman who is fighting against the coal pollution and corruption in her town of Kiselyovsk. It was directed by Alina Simone.
