= Ken Paulson =

American journalist

Kenneth A. Paulson (born 1953) is the director of the Free Speech Center at Middle Tennessee State University, former dean of MTSU's College of Media and Entertainment, and former editor-in-chief of USA Today.

Paulson led the "1 for All" campaign for the First Amendment He formerly hosted "The Songwriters," a television show MTSU created in partnership with the Nashville Songwriters Hall of Fame.

Paulson edited Gannett Company newspapers in Wisconsin, New York, New Jersey, and Florida, which led to a personal connection with Gannett president Al Neuharth, founder of the Freedom Forum. Paulson later led the Freedom Forum's First Amendment Center and its Newseum.

He earned a bachelor's degree in journalism from the University of Missouri and a Juris Doctor degree from the University of Illinois College of Law.

In 2018 Paulson testified before the United States House Committee on Education and Labor about how First Amendment rights were expressed on college campuses, saying he didn't "believe there’s an epidemic of suppression or intolerance in the nation’s universities." Instead, he said, most students were concerned about “paying for school, staying in school and making good enough grades to get a job when they leave.”
