= John Seigenthaler =

American journalist, writer, and political figure (1927–2014)

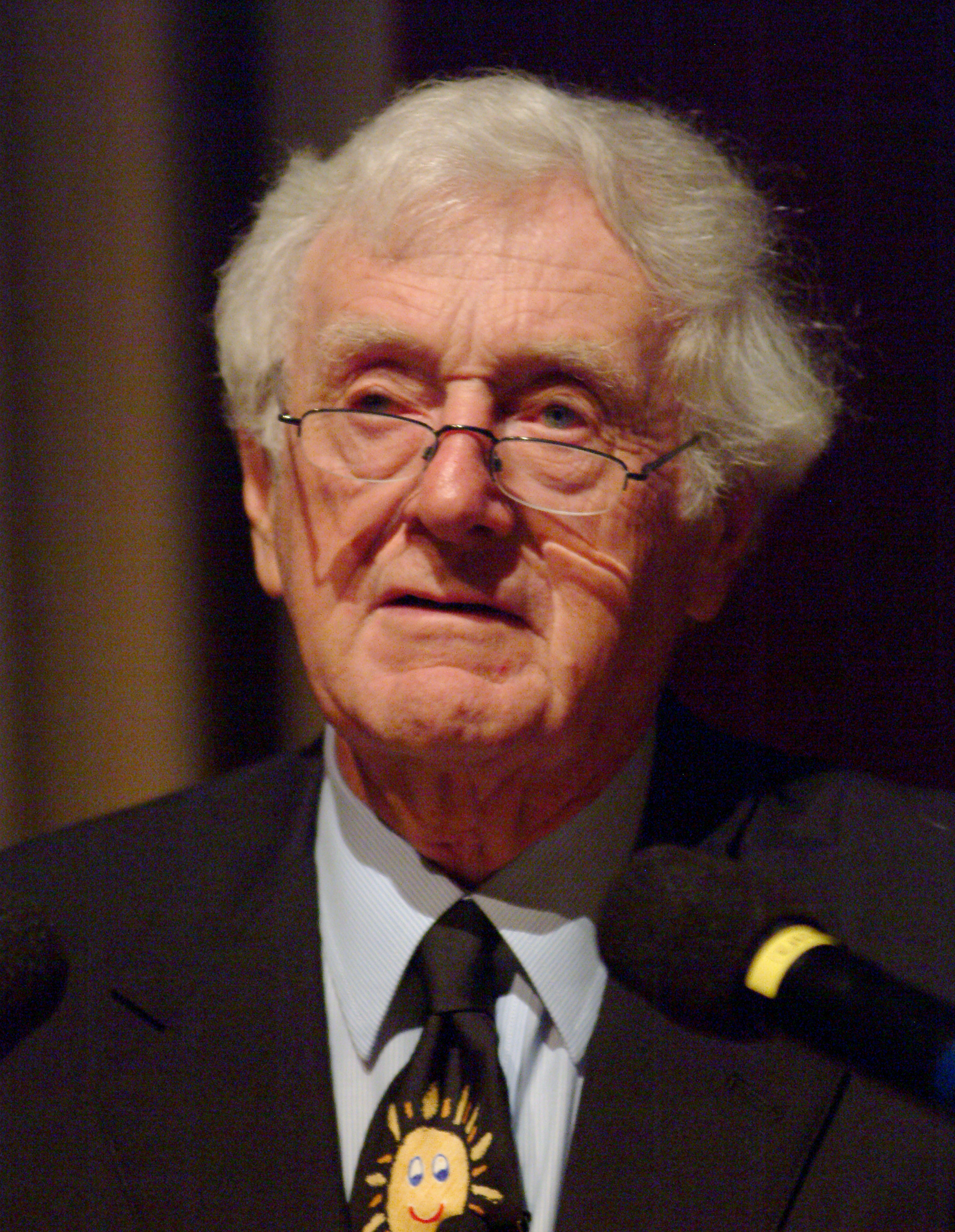
- Seigenthaler in 2008
- Born: John Lawrence Seigenthaler; July 27, 1927; Nashville, Tennessee, U.S.
- Died: July 11, 2014 (aged 86); Nashville, Tennessee, U.S.
- Occupations: Journalist; writer
- Years active: 1949–2014
- Spouse: Dolores Watson (m. 1955)
- Children: John Michael Seigenthaler
- Military career
- Allegiance: United States
- Branch: United States Air Force
- Service years: 1946–1949
- Rank: Sergeant

John Lawrence Seigenthaler (/ˈsiːɡənθɔːlər/ SEE-gən-thaw-lər; July 27, 1927 – July 11, 2014) was an American journalist, writer, and political figure. He was known as a prominent defender of First Amendment rights.

Seigenthaler joined the Nashville newspaper The Tennessean in 1949, resigning in 1960 to act as Robert F. Kennedy's administrative assistant. He rejoined The Tennessean as editor in 1962, publisher in 1973, and chairman in 1982 before retiring as chairman emeritus in 1991. Seigenthaler was also the founding editorial director of USA Today from 1982 to 1991. During this period, he served on the board of directors for the American Society of Newspaper Editors, and from 1988 to 1989, was its president.

Seigenthaler was the subject of a 2005 hoax on Wikipedia, in which an unregistered user claimed that he had been a suspect in the assassinations of John F. Kennedy and Robert F. Kennedy.

== Early life ==
Born in Nashville, Tennessee, Seigenthaler was the eldest of eight siblings. He attended Father Ryan High School and served in the U.S. Air Force from 1946 to 1949, achieving the rank of sergeant. After leaving the service, Seigenthaler was hired at The Tennessean. While working at The Tennessean, Seigenthaler took courses in sociology and literature at Peabody College before it became part of Vanderbilt University. He also attended the American Press Institute for Reporters at Columbia University.

== Career ==
=== Journalism ===
Seigenthaler began his career in journalism as a police beat reporter in The Tennessean city room after his uncle encouraged an editor about his talent. Seigenthaler gradually established himself on the staff among the heavy competition that included future standout journalists David Halberstam and Tom Wicker.

He first gained prominence in November 1953 when he tracked down the former Thomas C. Buntin and his wife, who had gone missing 22 years earlier. The case involved the son of a wealthy Nashville business owner who had disappeared in September 1931, followed six weeks later by the disappearance of his secretary. Seigenthaler was sent to Texas by The Tennessean after reports surfaced that Buntin (now known as Thomas D. Palmer) was living somewhere in Texas. While investigating in Orange, Texas, Seigenthaler saw an older man step off a bus. Noting the man's distinctive left ear, Seigenthaler followed him home. After three further days of investigation, he returned to the home, where he confirmed the identities of Buntin/Palmer, his wife, the former Betty McCuddy, and their six children. Seigenthaler won a National Headliner Award for the story.

Less than a year later, on October 5, 1954, Seigenthaler again made national news for saving a suicidal man from jumping off the Shelby Street Bridge in Nashville. Gene Bradford Williams had called The Tennessean saying he would jump and for the newspaper to "send a reporter and photographer if you want a story." After talking to Williams at the bridge for 40 minutes, Seigenthaler watched the man begin to attempt his 100-foot plunge off the bridge railing. Grabbing hold of his collar, Seigenthaler and police saved the man from falling into the Cumberland River. Williams muttered, "I'll never forgive you" to Seigenthaler. On April 29, 2014, the bridge was renamed the John Seigenthaler Pedestrian Bridge.

In July 1957, Seigenthaler began a battle to eliminate corruption within the local branch of the Teamsters, noting the criminal backgrounds of key employees, along with the use of intimidation in keeping news of certain union activities quiet. During this period, he contacted Dave Beck and Jimmy Hoffa, both top Teamsters officials, but the two men ignored Seigenthaler's queries. His series of articles resulted in the impeachment trial of Chattanooga Criminal Court Judge Ralston Schoolfield.

Seigenthaler took a one-year sabbatical from The Tennessean in 1958 to participate in Harvard University's prestigious Nieman Fellowship program. Upon returning to The Tennessean, Seigenthaler became an assistant city editor and special assignment reporter.

=== Politics ===
Frustrated by the leadership of Tennessean publisher Silliman Evans Jr., Seigenthaler resigned in 1960 to serve as an administrative assistant to incoming attorney general Robert F. Kennedy. On April 21, 1961, Seigenthaler was the only other Justice Department figure to witness a meeting between Kennedy and Martin Luther King Jr. He assisted Bobby Kennedy in the writing of his 1960 book The Enemy Within.

External videos
- "Interview with John Seigenthaler" conducted in 1985 for the Eyes on the Prize documentary in which he discusses serving as Attorney General Robert Kennedy's representative in meetings with Alabama officials.

During the Freedom Rides of 1961, Seigenthaler was sent in his capacity as assistant to Assistant Attorney General for Civil Rights John Doar to be chief negotiator for the government, in its attempts to work with Alabama Governor John Malcolm Patterson. After several days of refusing to return calls, Patterson finally agreed to protect the Riders, but their state trooper escort disappeared as soon as they arrived in Montgomery on May 20, 1961, leaving them unprotected before the waiting white mob.

Seigenthaler was a block away when he rushed to help Susan Wilbur, a Freedom Rider who was being chased by the angry mob. Seigenthaler shoved her into his car and shouted, "Get back! I'm with the Federal government" but was hit behind the left ear with a pipe. Knocked unconscious, he was not picked up until police arrived 10 minutes later, with Montgomery Police Commissioner Lester B. Sullivan noting, "We have no intention of standing police guard for a bunch of troublemakers coming into our city."

Seigenthaler's brief career in government would conclude as a result of Evans' death from a heart attack on July 29, 1961. A brief transition followed, during which longtime Tennessean reporter John Nye served as publisher. On March 20, 1962, the newspaper announced that Evans' brother, Amon Carter Evans, would be the new publisher.

One of the new Evans' first acts would be to bring back Seigenthaler as editor. The two had worked together at the paper when Seigenthaler served as assistant city editor and Evans was an aspiring journalist. On one occasion during that era, the two nearly came to blows over Seigenthaler's assignment of Evans to a story.

Evans named Seigenthaler editor of The Tennessean on March 21, 1962. With this new team in place, The Tennessean quickly regained its hard-hitting reputation. One example of the paper's resurgence came following a Democratic primary in August 1962, when The Tennessean found documented evidence of voter fraud based on absentee ballots in the city's second ward.

Seigenthaler's friendship with Kennedy became one of the focal points of Jimmy Hoffa's bid to shift his jury tampering trial from Nashville. Citing "one-sided, defamatory" coverage from the newspaper, Hoffa's lawyers got Seigenthaler to admit he wanted Hoffa convicted. However, the journalist noted that he had not conveyed those sentiments to his reporters. Hoffa's lawyers gained a minor victory when the trial was moved to Chattanooga in a change of venue, but Hoffa was nonetheless convicted in 1964 after a 45-day trial.

The following year, Seigenthaler led a fight for access to the Tennessee state senate chamber in Nashville after a resolution was passed revoking the floor privileges of Tennessean reporter Bill Kovach. The action came after Kovach had refused to leave a committee hearing following a call for executive session.

In December 1966, Seigenthaler and Richard Goodwin represented the Kennedy family when controversy developed about historian William Manchester's book about the John F. Kennedy assassination, The Death of a President. Seigenthaler had read an early version of the book, leading to Jacqueline Kennedy threatening a lawsuit over inaccurate and private statements.

Seigenthaler then took a temporary leave from his duties at the newspaper to work on Robert Kennedy's 1968 presidential campaign. During this period, the journalist was described by the New York Times as "one of a handful of advisers in whom [Kennedy] has absolute confidence." Moments after a victory in the California primary, Kennedy was shot by an assassin and died on June 6, 1968. Seigenthaler would serve as one of the pallbearers at his funeral, and later co-edited the book An Honorable Profession: A Tribute to Robert F. Kennedy.

Remaining focused on the cause of civil rights, Seigenthaler then supported Tennessee Bishop Joseph Aloysius Durick in 1969 during the latter's contentious fight to end segregation, a stance that outraged many in the community who still believed in the concept.

The New Yorker described Seigenthaler as being "well connected in the Democratic Party." He was called a "close family friend" of the Kennedys, a "longtime family friend" of the Gores, and a friend of former Democratic Senator James Sasser. In 1976, after having encouraged Al Gore to consider entering public life, he tipped off Gore that a nearby U. S. House representative was retiring. In 1981, Seigenthaler urged Sen. Sasser to return to the Democratic party's "liberal tradition": "I keep telling him that Reagan's going to make it respectable to be a liberal." In 1984, Reagan's reelection team vetoed Seigenthaler as a debate panelist for being too liberal.

=== In publishing ===
On February 8, 1973, Seigenthaler was promoted to publisher of the Tennessean, after Amon Carter Evans was named president of Tennessean Newspaper, Inc.

As the publisher, Seigenthaler worked with Al Gore, then a reporter, on investigative stories about Nashville city council corruption in the early 1970s. In February 1976, Seigenthaler contacted Gore at home to tip him off that U.S. Representative Joe L. Evins was retiring, telling Gore, "You know what I think." Seigenthaler had encouraged Gore to consider entering public life. Gore resigned from the paper and dropped out of Vanderbilt University Law School, beginning his political career by entering the race for Tennessee's 4th congressional district, a seat previously held by his father, Albert Gore Sr.

On May 5, 1976, Seigenthaler dismissed Jacque Srouji, a copy editor at The Tennessean, after finding that she had served as an informant for the Federal Bureau of Investigation (FBI) for much of the previous decade. The controversy came to light after Srouji testified before the Energy and Environment Subcommittee of the Senate Committee on Small Business and Entrepreneurship, which was investigating nuclear safety. Srouji, writing a book critical of Karen Silkwood, had perused more than 1000 pages of FBI documents about the nuclear power critic. In follow-up testimony, FBI agent Lawrence J. Olson Sr. acknowledged that the bureau had a "special relationship" with Srouji. Tennessean reporters had been suspicious of Srouji's reporting coups just months after she joined the paper. These included such things as a late-night FBI raid on illegal gambling establishments and one on a local business suspected of fraud.

Afterward, the FBI appears to have collected rumors about Seigenthaler. FBI Deputy Assistant Director Homer Boynton told an editor of The New York Times to "look into Seigenthaler", whom he called "not entirely pure." After hearing this, Seigenthaler tried for a year to get his own FBI dossier. He finally received some highly expurgated material, including these words: "Allegations of Seigenthaler having illicit relations with young girls, which information source obtained from an unnamed source." He had previously promised to publish whatever the FBI gave him and did so. He flatly stated that the charges were false. The attorney general issued an apology, the allegations were removed from Seigenthaler's file, and he received the 1976 Sidney Hillman Prize for "courage in publishing".

In May 1982, Seigenthaler was named the first editorial director of USA Today. In announcing the appointment, Gannett president Allen Neuharth said Seigenthaler was "one of the most thoughtful and respected editors in America." During Seigenthaler's tenure at USA Today, he frequently commuted between Nashville and Washington to fulfill his duties at both newspapers.

The publication of author Peter Maas' 1983 book, Marie: A True Story, again put Seigenthaler under scrutiny over the investigation of a pardon scandal involving former Tennessee governor Ray Blanton. Marie Ragghianti was the head of the state's Board of Pardons and Paroles before being fired after refusing to release prisoners who had bribed Blanton's aides. Since the Tennessean had supported Blanton, the newspaper's initial reluctance in investigating the charges was called into question. However, editors and reporters had believed that Ragghianti's alleged broken affair with Blanton's chief counsel, T. Edward Sisk, motivated her claims.

=== Later life ===
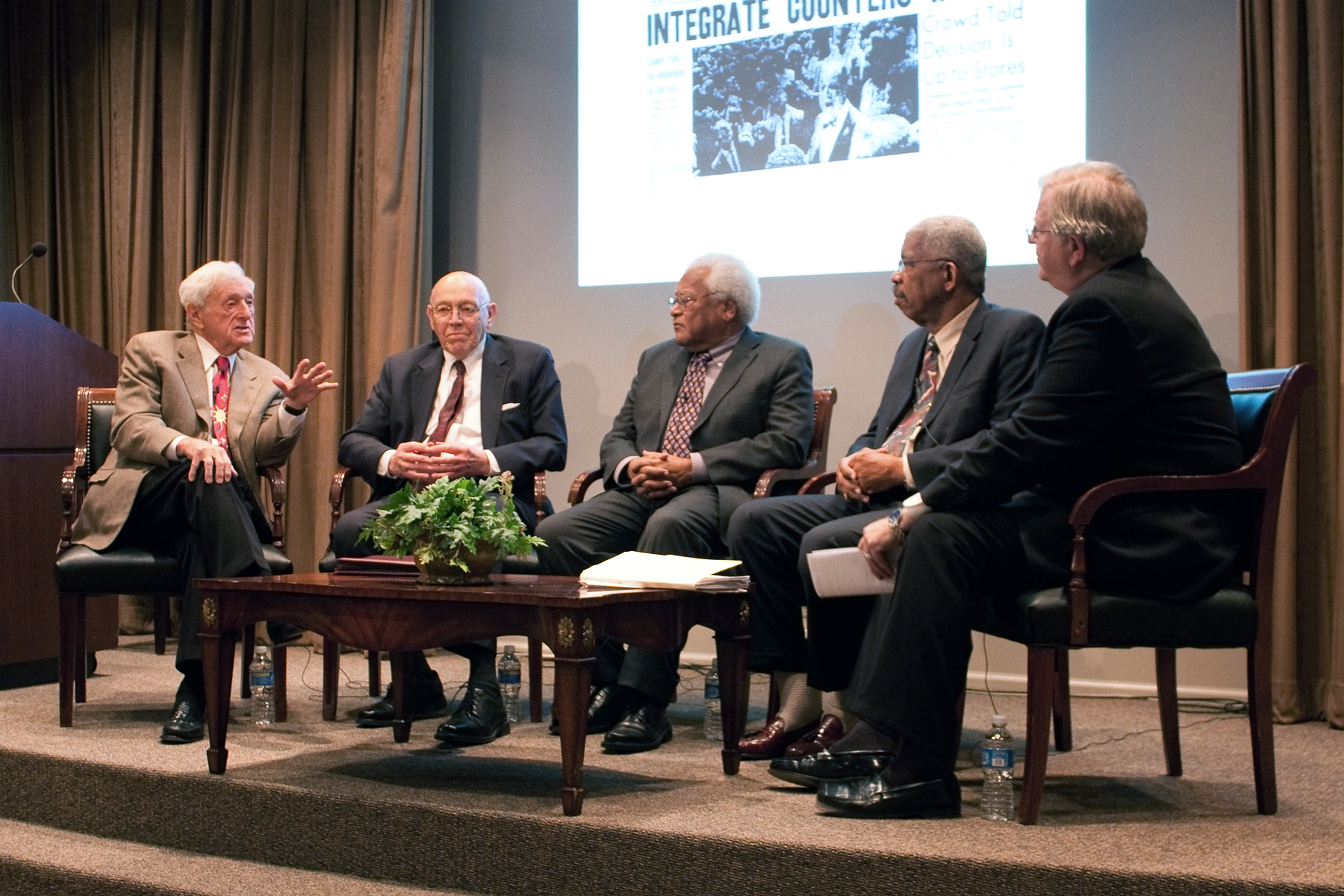
Seigenthaler discussing media coverage of the Nashville sit-ins at a 2010 panel discussion

In 1986, Middle Tennessee State University established the John Seigenthaler Chair of Excellence in First Amendment Studies, honoring Seigenthaler's "lifelong commitment to free expression values".

Seigenthaler announced his retirement in December 1991 from The Tennessean, just months after he made a similar announcement concerning his tenure at USA Today.

On December 15, 1991, Seigenthaler founded the First Amendment Center at Vanderbilt University, saying, "It is my hope that this center at Vanderbilt University ... will help promote appreciation and understanding for those values so vital in a democratic society." The center serves as a forum for dialog about First Amendment issues, including freedom of speech, press, and religion.

In 1996, Seigenthaler received the Elijah Parish Lovejoy Award as well as an honorary Doctor of Laws degree from Colby College.

In 2001, Seigenthaler was appointed to the National Commission on Federal Election Reform that followed the 2000 presidential election. He was also a member of the Constitution Project on Liberty and Security.

In 2002, when it was discovered that USA Today reporter Jack Kelley had fabricated some of his stories, USA Today turned to Seigenthaler, along with veteran editors Bill Hilliard and Bill Kovach, to monitor the investigation.

In 2002, Vanderbilt renamed the 57,000-square-foot (5,300 m^{2}) building that houses the Freedom Forum, First Amendment Center, and Diversity Institute the John Seigenthaler Center. At one point, USA Today and Freedom Forum founder Allen Neuharth called Seigenthaler "the best champion of the First Amendment."

In April 2014, the Shelby Street Bridge was renamed the John Seigenthaler Pedestrian Bridge in his honor.

Seigenthaler hosted a book review program on Nashville public television station WNPT, called A Word on Words, and chaired the selection committees for the John F. Kennedy Library Foundation's Profiles in Courage Award and the Robert F. Kennedy Memorial's Robert F. Kennedy Book Award.

==== Wikipedia biography incident ====
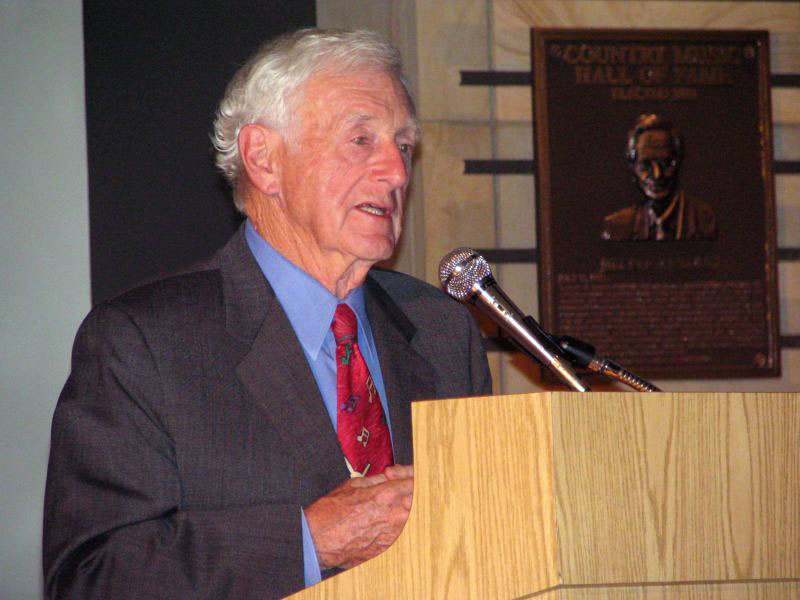
John Seigenthaler in October 2005

On May 26, 2005, an unregistered Wikipedia user created a five-sentence biographical article about Seigenthaler that contained false and defamatory content. The false statement in Seigenthaler's Wikipedia article read:

John Seigenthaler Sr. was the assistant to Attorney General Robert Kennedy in the early 1960s. For a brief time, he was thought to have been directly involved in the Kennedy assassinations of both John, and his brother, Bobby. Nothing was ever proven.

When alerted of the article's existence, Seigenthaler directly contacted Wikipedia co-founder Larry Sanger and demanded that the libelous content be expunged. He also contacted Wikipedia co-founder Jimmy Wales, who removed the false claims. As Seigenthaler later wrote: "For four months, Wikipedia depicted me as a suspected assassin before Wales erased it from his website's history [on October 5]."

Seigenthaler noted that the falsehoods written about him on Wikipedia were later posted on Answers.com and Reference.com. He later wrote an op-ed on the experience for USA Today in which he wrote, "And so we live in a universe of new media with phenomenal opportunities for worldwide communications and research – but populated by volunteer vandals with poison-pen intellects. Congress has enabled them and protects them", a reference to the protection from liability that internet service providers are given under federal law versus editorially controlled media like newspapers and television.

According to a scholar specializing in biographies, including digital life narratives, "The Seigenthaler case became a formative moment in Wikipedia's history, and led to the development of policies to protect individuals from defamation."

== Death ==
Seigenthaler died of complications from colon cancer on July 11, 2014, at the age of 86, surrounded by his family in his home.

== Publications ==
External videos
- Booknotes interview with Seigenthaler on James K. Polk, January 18, 2004, C-SPAN

- Seigenthaler, John (1971). A Search for Justice. Aurora Publishers. ISBN 0-87695-003-9.
- Seigenthaler, John (1974). The Year of the Scandal Called Watergate. New York: Times Books. ISBN 0-914636-01-4.
- Seigenthaler, John (2004). James K. Polk: 1845–1849: The American Presidents Series. New York: Times Books. ISBN 0-8050-6942-9.
