= First Amendment Center =

American civil liberties organization

The First Amendment Center, founded in 1991, is a nonprofit, nonpartisan organization that supports the First Amendment and builds understanding of its core freedoms through education, information, and entertainment. The center serves as a forum for the study and exploration of free-expression issues, including freedom of speech, of the press and of religion, and the rights to assemble and to petition the government.

== History ==
John Seigenthaler founded the First Amendment Center at Vanderbilt University in 1991.

In 2007, the First Amendment Center had offices at Vanderbilt and Arlington, Va.

== Programs ==
The First Amendment Center is an operating program of the Freedom Forum and is associated with the Newseum and the Diversity Institute. The center has offices in the John Seigenthaler Center at Vanderbilt University in Nashville, Tennessee, and at the Newseum in Washington, D.C.

The center's programs, including the Religious Freedom Education Project at the Newseum, provide education and information to the public and groups including First Amendment scholars and experts, educators, government policymakers, legal experts, and students. The center is nonpartisan and does not lobby, litigate or provide legal advice.

The center's website is a source of news, information, and commentary in the nation on First Amendment issues. It features daily updates on news about First Amendment-related developments, as well as detailed reports about U.S. Supreme Court cases involving the First Amendment, and commentary, analysis and special reports on free expression, press freedom, and religious-liberty issues.

== See also ==
- Becket Fund for Religious Liberty
- First Liberty Institute
