= Paul Miller (journalist) =

American newspaper executive and journalist

- Born: September 28, 1906; Diamond, Missouri
- Died: August 21, 1991 (aged 84); West Palm Beach, Florida
- Occupation: Journalist
- Known for: Headed Gannett Company, 1957–1973

Paul Miller (September 28, 1906 – August 21, 1991) was an American newspaper executive and journalist. He headed the Gannett newspaper chain from 1957 to 1973. Miller also served as the top official of the Associated Press from 1963 to 1977.

== Early years ==
Paul Miller was born on September 28, 1906, in Diamond, Missouri, to the Rev. James Miller, an itinerant Protestant minister, and his devoted wife, Clara Miller née Ranne. Over the next thirteen years, the Millers added four daughters and a second son to their "brood", as Clara once affectionately referred to her children. Between the time Miller was born and the year of his high school graduation in 1925, the family moved no fewer than seven times to small towns in Missouri, Arkansas, and Oklahoma, a circumstance that seems not to have affected him then or later. One reason may be that despite his family’s peripatetic lifestyle, the Miller home, wherever it happened to be, seems always to have been a source of warmth, affection and traditional Christian values.

Miller showed an early predisposition for writing. His first experiment in journalism occurred with the publication of Vol. I, August 1920, No. 1, of The Boy Sportsman. Miller pronounced it "The Official Organ of The Lone Scout Athletic Club," and informed his readers that it would be "Published Monthly by Paul T. Miller, Quapaw, Okla." The success – or not – of The Boy Sportsman is unknown as, for whatever reasons, Miller moved on the next year to publish The Boy Athlete: Every Boys Magazine, with his name on the cover as "Paul Miller, Editor, Quapaw, Oklahoma." Again, its success, or failure, remains a mystery.

Miller’s earliest experiences with newspapering prepared him well for greater journalistic responsibilities. At the age of fifteen, he won a national high school editorial writing contest, and as a senior secured top honors in a similar competition held by the University of Wisconsin. Also in his senior year, he served as the editor of the Pawhuska High School newspaper, The Wah-Sha-She (Osage for "the water people"), which under his direction earned national recognition by winning several interscholastic publication contests.

In addition to his high-school editorship of The Wah-Sha-She, Miller also demonstrated abilities in sports, outside activities, and academics. He was captain of the Pawhuska Huskies football team as well as a Tulsa World selection for all-state tackle in 1924. He was twice captain of the school’s basketball squad as well as all-district center in the 1924 Tulsa basketball tournament. Miller worked periodically as both reporter and city editor for the Pawhuska Daily Journal-Capital – his first experience in the larger world of journalism, and one which provided him invaluable knowledge in newspapering. He graduated from high school in the spring of 1925 with strong enough academic credentials to qualify him for admittance to Oklahoma A&M College at Stillwater, Oklahoma.

In Miller's first semester, he ran for and won the election for president of the freshman class. In his sophomore year, he continued to gain experience as a newspaperman at the same time that lack of money threatened to force him to leave school and get a job. He had already served as assistant sports editor for The O’Collegian when he became its acting managing editor on February 1, 1927, and managing editor on March 29, 1927. Despite these promotions, however, he faced stiff competition from former sports editor Otis Wile in the campus-wide election for editor of the paper. Miller lost the election to Wile by 24 votes out of a total of 1744 votes cast, which was 30% percent higher than the total votes cast for any other elected position. His supporters had cautioned that if their candidate lost the election, Miller would be unable to stay in school – a prophecy fulfilled that nevertheless offered him other opportunities in newspapering.

A short column in the May 29, 1927, edition of The Okemah Daily Leader advised its readers that "Paul Miller, present managing editor of The O’Collegian, will become editor of The Okemah Daily Leader at the conclusion of this term."

Miller remained on the staff of the Okemah Publishing Company for fifteen months, although he moved to Norman, Oklahoma, to become a feature writer for the Oklahoma City Times. While losing the election for the relatively high-paying job of managing editor for the O’Collegian had forced him to leave Oklahoma A&M, his new position with the Times made it possible for him to return to school at the University of Oklahoma. His decision to enroll there may also have been influenced by his parents’ move to Norman, where his father served as executive secretary of Oklahoma Christian Churches. In the late summer or early fall of 1928 the Okemah Daily Leader reported the loss of its "popular editor," and noted that he had recently resigned, and was to leave Okemah for Norman where he would "enroll as a special student in the state university" [and] "serve as staff correspondent for the Daily Oklahoman and Times."

Miller attended school at the University of Oklahoma from the fall of 1928 to the spring of 1930, while at the same time pursuing his new duties as a correspondent both for the Daily Oklahoman and the Oklahoma City Times. During this time, he became the president of the University of Oklahoma chapter of Sigma Delta Chi, a professional journalism fraternity.

The June 17, 1930, issue of the O’Collegian featured a column proclaiming Miller's return to Stillwater: "Enlargement of the department of information and service, created at Oklahoma A. and M. college last February by President Henry G. Bennett, has been announced, with Paul Miller added to the staff, effective June 15." The paper went on to say that Miller "had wide training and experience in newspaper activities," specifically, the Oklahoma City Times, Daily Oklahoman, Pawhuska Daily Journal-Capital, Guthrie Daily Leader, and Okemah Daily Leader and Weekly Ledger. Two years later, as head of the department, Miller's duties, according to the Oklahoma A&M college yearbook, The Redskin, were to see "to it that the name of the college is constantly kept before the attention of the people of the state. His chief function is the supplying of news matter regarding the school for the state papers." In addition to his staff duties with the department, Miller also wrote for The A. and M. College Magazine, and served on the staff of The Redskin.

== Associated Press ==
Miller remained in Stillwater and attended Oklahoma A&M until February 1932, then accepted an offer to work for the Associated Press at Columbus, Ohio. Earlier, while working for the Oklahoma City Times and the Daily Oklahoman in Norman, he had so impressed the A.P.'s bureau chief in Oklahoma City, Leon Durst, that he had written to his superiors: "Here is a man the AP should have."

From March 1, 1932, until the fall of 1933, Miller worked as a rewrite man and night filing editor for the Associated Press at its Columbus bureau. It was here that he acquired and first applied the knowledge that allowed him to excel as an "A.P. man." This was also where he met and married Louise Johnson.

Miller received his diploma from Oklahoma A&M College in 1933.

After less than a year of marriage, the Millers began to prepare for the first of many moves they would make throughout their years with the Associated Press. Officials at the A.P.'s New York City bureau had taken notice of Miller's work and requested his transfer to work at the cable desk there. He accepted the promotion, and served as that bureau's cable and general news editor from the fall of 1933 until February 1935.

Other promotions occurred in rapid succession. In early 1935, Miller became night desk editor at the A.P.'s Kansas City bureau, a position he held until March 1936. On April 1, 1936, he became the A.P.'s bureau chief at Salt Lake City, Utah. Almost immediately, A.P. operations at Salt Lake City began to improve. He took charge of Associated Press news service and personnel for the entire state of Pennsylvania as chief of bureau with offices at Harrisburg in July 1937. That December, Miller's bureau moved to Philadelphia, Pennsylvania, where he remained until April 1941 when the A.P.'s general manager, Kent Cooper, reassigned him to New York, initially as Cooper's executive assistant, and later as vice president and director of operations of Wide World Inc.

In June 1942, Cooper elevated Miller to the top A.P. posting in the nation's capital, Chief of Bureau, Washington, D.C. Miller would become one of the most successful journalists of the twentieth century, eventually ascending to the presidencies of both the Associated Press and the Gannett Co., Inc.

Nevertheless, the ultimate highlight of a long and storied career was always his wartime service in the capital of a nation then engulfed in global war. As he later recalled during an interview following his retirement in 1979: "But someone is always saying what do you think you enjoyed most. I really have enjoyed everything. But if you have to say what was the most exciting assignment or years, you certainly have to say Washington..."

On 29 June 1942, one day after the Germans opened their second summer offensive of World War II in the Soviet Union, Miller wrote to Kent Cooper in New York: "I went to work here today. Sincerely yours." The hard-driving bureau chief immediately set about familiarizing himself with his new surroundings. As he later remembered: "I'd never been in Washington previously, except for brief visits. I didn't know where anything was. I didn't know anybody. Impressions swirled around in my brain, grew brighter or dimmer, gave way to new and better ones..." His most vivid impressions were those he formed of the most influential people in wartime Washington, and which he documented "to bridge the gap between a day in June of 1942 and this wintry day in February of 1943 when I finally am getting around to keeping a diary".

While Miller never did keep a diary, he did assemble files of confidential memoranda dutifully prepared from off-the-record meetings with many of the nation's top military and political leaders. Foremost among them were both wartime presidents, Franklin D. Roosevelt and Harry S. Truman; Army Chief of Staff General George Marshall; and Commander-in-Chief, U.S. Fleet (COMINCH)/Chief of Naval Operations Admiral Ernest King. Other notable figures who provided Miller with confidential information included British Prime Minister Winston Churchill; Republican presidential nominee Wendell Willkie; Secretary of the Navy Frank Knox; Commander of the China-Burma-India (CBI) Theater General Joseph Stilwell; Chairman of the War Production Board Donald Nelson; former secretary of war and one of Roosevelt's personal overseas representatives, Major General Pat Hurley; U.S. Ambassador to the Soviet Union Averell Harriman; Assistant Secretary of War John McCloy; Supreme Commander of Allied Forces in the Southwest Pacific Area General Douglas MacArthur; Commander of the Far East Air Forces Lieutenant General George Kenney, and Secretary of State Edward Stettinius Jr.

Arranged chronologically for the three years from March, 1943 to March, 1946, the files contain information regarding both America's military strategy during the last two-and-a-half years of the war and its leaders' visions for the postwar world. Miller's memoranda reveal the thoughts and feelings of men who, despite having learned from long experience with the public to guard their remarks, expressed themselves freely in their off-the-record briefings to the select group of newspaper correspondents, of whom Miller was one. His memoranda also trace the gradual shift from military to political imperatives which surfaced during the final stages of the war.

Several significant events marked Miller's Associated Press career in the two years prior to his move to the Gannett Co., Inc. In mid-1945, he directed the A.P.'s coverage of the United Nations Conference on International Organization (UNCIO) in San Francisco, California. Miller also accompanied the first round-the-world Pan American "Globester" flight in the fall of that year. In June 1947, he returned to his alma mater of Oklahoma A&M, and delivered the commencement address.

Although Miller left the A.P. the following August to join Gannett as executive assistant to the company's founder, Frank E. Gannett, his career with the Associated Press was far from over. In April 1950, he became the first former employee to win election to the A.P.'s board of directors. In 1952, he joined the A.P. Board of Directors' Executive Committee. In 1963, he ascended to the presidency of the Associated Press, and went on to win reelection annually for the next 14 years, although the A.P. changed his title to chairman in 1972. Miller resigned that post in 1977, but remained on the board of directors until 1978. Of his A.P. career, Louis D. Boccardi, president and general manager of the Associated Press at the time of Miller's death, wrote: "Paul Miller was not just AP's chairman. He was its champion, always challenging us to do better but never failing to hail a job well done. He had many interests and many successes but we always knew he loved the AP."

== The Gannett Co., Inc. ==
Soon after joining Gannett on August 1, 1947, Miller moved his family to the company’s headquarters at Rochester, New York, and soon rose to prominence in its civic affairs. His dedication to community involvement surfaced that year with his mayoral appointment as chairman of the committee responsible for construction of the Community War Memorial, and continued for more than twenty years. A gifted fund-raiser, Miller served the American Red Cross and Community Chest in that capacity for ten years beginning in 1949. By 1959, he had become a Thirty-second Degree Mason, a member of the Rochester Consistory, and a Shriner of the Damascus Temple. Two years later, he received a citation for "outstanding service to the cause of brotherhood" from the National Conference of Christians and Jews for his role as National Chairman of the Newspaper Brotherhood Week Press Committee. That same year, New York Governor Nelson Rockefeller appointed Miller to the Commission on the Celebration of the Centennial of the Morrill Land Grant Act; the following year he became its chairman. In 1964, the newly formed Rochester chapter of the Society of Professional Journalists, Sigma Delta Chi, elected Miller president. The year after that he became President of the Lend-a-Hand Society, and in 1966 began a three-year appointment to the President’s Committee on Employment of the Handicapped.

Miller rose swiftly at Gannett. In 1949, he succeeded Frank Gannett as editor and publisher of the Rochester, New York Times-Union, became the company’s vice-president, and joined its board of directors.

On his first European trip as a Gannett executive, Miller represented the American Newspaper Publishers Association at the International Congress of Publishers and Editors at Amsterdam, the Netherlands. While overseas he met with newspapermen in London and Paris, then flew into Berlin on a coal-laden transport plane to report on the condition of that city in the aftermath of the Berlin Airlift.

The following year, Miller accompanied a group of newspaper publishers, radio executives, and officials on an eight-day trip to Brazil, Uruguay, and Argentina as guests of Pan American World Airways. In Argentina, he interviewed President Juan Perón and First Lady Eva Perón. Miller ended the year as the recipient of the National American Legion Citizenship Medal, the first of many such honors recognizing his community activism.

Over the course of the next four years, Miller continued his steady rise at Gannett. In 1951, the Millers were guests of the British news agency, Reuters, for its centennial celebration in London. There he met with Anthony Eden, deputy leader of Britain’s Conservative Party. Afterward, Miller traveled to Paris to interview General Dwight D. Eisenhower concerning reports that he might be a candidate for the Republican presidential nomination in 1952. On December 11, 1951, Miller became both publisher of the Rochester Democrat and Chronicle and executive vice president of Gannett. In 1953, he joined the board of directors of the Gannett Foundation, and received an appointment to the Harvard University committee for selecting candidates for Nieman Fellowships, an award given to mid-career journalists by the Nieman Foundation for Journalism at Harvard University. The following year, Miller visited Guatemala in the wake of the anti-Communist counterrevolution, and later submitted a series of eyewitness accounts of conditions and prospects under the then-new government of U.S.-backed strongman, Carlos Castillo Armas. On May 19, 1955, Frank E. Gannett virtually confirmed Miller as his successor at Gannett by naming Miller "Operating Head in Fact" of the company.

Miller’s workload increased considerably in 1956 as he embarked on another South American tour, this time to Venezuela, Panama, Guatemala, and Mexico. He joined the boards of directors of two companies, the board of trustees of a third, and became a member of the advisory board on the Pulitzer Prizes. He also received his first of many honorary degrees, this one an honorary Doctor of Science degree from Clarkson College of Technology at Potsdam, New York.

In September, Miller embarked on his most ambitious overseas trip when he reported on the Second London Conference over the Suez Canal crisis. In London he met with British Prime Minister Sir Anthony Eden, who received him at 10 Downing Street.

He then flew to Cairo to see for himself if the Egyptians were successfully managing the day-to-day operations of the Suez Canal. In his opinion, they were. Subsequently, he submitted his observations and conclusions in a pamphlet titled "Suez Canal Report."

Miller began 1957 by writing the first of his weekly editorial columns for the Saturday Times-Union, a practice he would continue with few interruptions until 1979. In April, Miller succeeded Frank Gannett as president and chief executive officer of Gannett. That same month, Miller became president of the Frank E. Gannett Newspaper Foundation – owner of 20% of the stock of the Gannett Co., Inc. – and of radio station WHEC and WHEC-TV. Miller attended the NATO Conference in Paris, France, in December to end the year.

In April 1958 Miller joined the boards of directors of the Brand Names Foundation and the Automobile Club of Rochester. A month later, he succeeded to the chairmanship of the advisory board of the American Press Institute, and received a Kiwanis Public Service Award. Miller also reported from Israel, France, Switzerland, and Italy in October as a member of the Rochester delegation which first paid a goodwill visit to Rochester’s sister city, Rennes, France.

The next May, Miller returned to his adopted home state, and addressed students at the University of Oklahoma on Journalism Day – one of hundreds of speeches he would deliver throughout the remainder of his tenure at Gannett. Recognition for his many contributions to journalism continued as Ursinus College of Collegeville, Pennsylvania, bestowed upon him its Honorary Doctor of Laws Degree in June 1959.

The new decade began with Miller’s election to the presidency of the Rochester Convention and Publicity Bureau, and his receipt of the Lester P. Slade Award for "outstanding journalistic contributions" in January 1960. It continued the following month with his fact-finding visit to Havana, Cuba.

The National Conference of Christians and Jews named Miller National Chairman of the Newspaper Brotherhood Week Committee in January 1961, an honor for which he received a citation in April for "outstanding service to the cause of brotherhood." That same month Miller hosted the Inter-American Press Association Convention in New York City, and the Civic Committee of the People-to-People Program recognized him with an award for his efforts in establishing the "sister cities" relationship between Rochester and Rennes, France. In June, New York Governor Nelson Rockefeller appointed Miller to a commission observing the 100th anniversary of the Morrill Land-Grant Act; the next year, its members elected Miller chairman of the Temporary Commission on the Celebration of the Centennial of the Morrill Land-Grant Act.

1962 began with a luncheon invitation to the White House from President John F. Kennedy. In February, the National Conference of Christians and Jews renamed Miller chairman of the National Brotherhood Week Press Committee for another year. In June, he departed for a 23-day tour of Russia that featured an interview with the First Secretary of the Central Committee of the Communist Party of the Soviet Union and the Chairman of the Council of Ministers, Nikita S. Khrushchev. Miller completed the trip with a visit to Berlin in the company of his longtime friend, Walker Stone, then editor-in-chief of the Scripps-Howard Newspapers.

Upon his return to the United States, Miller wrote and in October published an account of his trip titled "Russia: 1962". Following its successful publication, Miller delivered six addresses that year to audiences across the country, including serving as Master of Ceremonies at the Rochester Chamber of Commerce 75th anniversary dinner.

Over the course of the following year, Miller experienced both "triumph and tragedy." In one of his more triumphant moments as a journalist, he was elected president of the Associated Press in January 1963 – an office to which he would be re-elected annually until his resignation as chairman in 1977. Miller then took up where he left off the year before, and beginning in February spoke to numerous appreciative audiences eager to hear about his trip to the Soviet Union. One of his more remarkable addresses occurred on February 11, 1963, when he presented the Fourteenth Annual William Allen White Memorial Lecture entitled "Inside a Newspaper Group" at the University of Kansas at which time he received its William Allen White Award for journalism merit. Miller delivered his final speech of 1963 in Boca Raton, Florida, to the Southern Newspaper Publishers Association on November 18. President Kennedy died of his gunshot wounds in Dallas, Texas, four days later, and Miller was one of those who attended the funeral in St. Matthew's Cathedral, Washington, D.C., on November 25. Shortly afterward, Miller found himself invited once again to a White House luncheon, this time as the guest of President Lyndon B. Johnson.

American society changed radically throughout the 1960s, and Miller’s approach to journalism changed with it. In 1963, he conceived the idea of a series of articles to appear in Gannett newspapers that would explore the positive aspects of racial integration in selected communities. Miller’s reward was a Pulitzer Special Citation for Gannett – the first Pulitzer Prize ever awarded to a newspaper chain. And although he helped organize Rochester’s local opposition to militant agitator Saul D. Alinsky’s work in the wake of that city’s riots in the summer of 1964, Miller also visited Rochester’s inner city to speak with black leaders of FIGHT (Freedom, Independence [Integration], God, Honor, Today), a Rochester civil rights organization founded with Alinsky’s support in Rochester. Miller also received the Sigma Delta Chi Fellowship Award in August, and became the president of that organization’s Rochester chapter in September. Miller ended the year by becoming a director of the 1964-1965 New York World’s Fair and with two trips to Mexico City. In October, he attended the Inter-American Press Association Convention there; and two months later he was present for the inauguration of President Gustav Diaz Ordaz.

For Miller, 1965 was a year of varied activity. That January he attended President Johnson’s Inaugural Ball. Ten days later Miller was in London for the funeral of the Right Honorable Sir Winston Spencer Churchill, although he quickly returned to New York upon hearing of the death of his friend and mentor, former general manager of the Associated Press, Kent Cooper. Miller joined the Board of Trustees of the University of Rochester in February; and in April, Syracuse University presented him with its Distinguished Service to Journalism Award. In June, Miller and the Gannett newspapers received the Mass Media Brotherhood Award from the National Conference of Christians and Jews, and Union College of Schenectady, New York, conferred upon Miller an Honorary Doctor of Laws degree, and made him honorary chancellor of the university. Later that August Miller was a guest of Vice President Hubert H. Humphrey at the Capitol. Miller traveled extensively that fall delivering numerous speeches to professional and civic organizations. In December, he gave the Sigma Delta Chi Foundation Lecture at the University of Michigan, and before the year was out found himself the new president of the Lend-a-Hand Society.

Gannett’s fortunes continued to rise as Miller prepared to take the company public. On March 21, 1966, the first issue of TODAY hit newsstands, and its original format became an instant commercial success. The next month, the company purchased the ten weeklies of the Suburban Newspaper Group, headquartered at Cherry Hill, New Jersey. The first public offering of Gannett stock occurred on October 25, 1967, after an expansion program that had resulted in the company owning 53 newspapers in 16 states. Less than a year-and-a-half later Gannett landed on the New York Stock Exchange, and shortly thereafter Gannett stock split 3/2.

Throughout the years from 1966 to 1969, Miller’s professional achievements matched his entrepreneurial successes. In May 1966, President Johnson appointed Miller for a three-year term to the President’s Committee on Employment of the Handicapped, and rewarded him the following January with another personal invitation to the White House. In October 1966, Miller attended his second Inter-American Press Association Convention, this time in Lima, Peru. His awards during this period included the Prophet-at-Sight Master Mason Award in 1966; the 1967 Distinguished Service to Journalism Award from the University of Missouri, and election to its journalism school’s Hall of Fame; and the 1968 Distinguished Service to Journalism Award from the Ohio Press Association. Miller received two Honorary Doctor of Laws degrees in 1968, the first from Westminster College, Salt Lake City, Utah, and the second from Niagara University, Niagara Falls, New York. In addition to his other executive responsibilities, four major corporate entities welcomed him to their boards of directors: Bausch & Lomb in 1966; the Saratoga Performing Arts Center, Saratoga Springs, New York, and the Hotel Waldorf-Astoria Corporation in 1968; and the Twentieth-Century Fox Film Corporation in 1969. Also that year, Miller delivered ten major addresses, and attended Sunday worship services at the invitation of President Richard M. Nixon in April, a luncheon for former President Johnson and Mrs. Johnson at the Cape Kennedy Hilton in July, and a White House dinner with other Associated Press executives in October.

Miller became chairman and chief executive officer of Gannett in May 1970 having passed the title of president and chief operating officer to Allen H. Neuharth whom Miller had recruited from Knight (subsequently, Knight-Ridder) Newspapers in 1963 as general manager of the Times-Union and Democrat and Chronicle and key executive on special projects. Miller departed for a month-long trip later that summer to several major European cities including London, Prague, Bucharest, Budapest, Belgrade, Dubrovnik (with side trips to Sarajevo, Sveti Stefan, and Boka Koforsha), Rome, Barcelona, Palma, and Lisbon. And in recognition of Miller’s coverage of the United Nations Conference on International Organization in 1945, President Nixon named Miller to the President’s Commission for the Observance of the Twenty-fifth Anniversary of the United Nations. Miller’s Pacific-area trip in the summer of 1971 netted him visits to Honolulu, Hawaii; Guam, Manila, the Philippines; Tokyo, Japan; Hong Kong, and Seoul, South Korea.

The next two years marked the zenith of Miller’s careers at both Gannett and the Associated Press. In April 1972, Miller became chairman of the Associated Press. Later that summer, he took a group of A.P. executives to China for three weeks to visit Canton, Zhengzhou, Beijing, Yan'an, Xi'an, Nanjing, Suzhou, and Shanghai. Over the course of their stay they met first with the Premier of the People’s Republic of China, Zhou Enlai, and later negotiated an agreement for regular news exchange between the Associated Press and the Chinese news agency, Xinhua News. It marked the first time in twenty-two years that an American news agency had a regular news channel with China. And just as he had after his trip to Russia ten years earlier, Miller wrote and spoke extensively about his experiences in China. In January 1973, he accompanied his longtime friend, U.S. Secretary of State William P. Rogers, to Paris for the signing of the Indochina peace treaty. Shortly after his return, Miller became chairman of the board of Gannett Co., Inc. at the same time that President Neuharth moved from chief operating officer to chief executive officer. Miller ended the year honored by New York magazine as one of the ten most influential men in the communications industry and by the Rochester Sales Executive Club as Distinguished Salesman of the Year, as an inductee into the Oklahoma Hall of Fame, and with another tour of the Pacific.

Miller continued to travel extensively and to accrue numerous honors and awards despite his diminished executive role at Gannett. In 1974, as Chairman of both Gannett and the Associated Press, he received an Honorary Doctor of Humane Letters degree from Transylvania University, at Lexington, Kentucky. Miller also delivered the commencement address that perfectly reflected his worldview: Not Cynicism but Hope. Miller returned to China the following year for a second visit, and upon his return U.S. News & World Report named him one of the five most influential newspaper executives in the United States. In March 1976, Oklahoma State University named its new journalism building the Paul Miller Journalism and Broadcasting Building. Two months later, Miller set off on yet another trip to the Pacific, this time traveling to Taiwan (Republic of China), Hong Kong, and Japan.

Miller’s final working years signaled the end of an unmatched career in American journalism. His achievements had been the subject of articles in FINANCE-magazine, Time, Forbes, Wall Street Reports, The Wall Street Transcript, Business Week, and others. When in 1957 he succeeded Frank Gannett as president and chief executive officer of Gannett Co., Inc., the Gannett Group included 19 dailies and broadcasting stations in four states. By 1977, it embraced 77 daily newspapers and broadcast stations in 30 states, Guam, and St. Thomas, U.S. Virgin Islands, as well as interest in a Canadian newsprint company and Gannett-owned Louis Harris and Associates, Inc. Gannett daily newspaper circulation grew from 775,700 to 3,000,000. Gannett revenues grew from $46,000,000 in 1957 to $557,000,000-plus in 1977.

On December 31, 1978, after 31 years with the company, Miller retired at age 73 as chairman of Gannett Co., Inc., although he continued to serve as a Gannett director and consultant. At that time he could claim membership in the Gridiron Club; the Metropolitan Club and the Burning Tree Club of Washington, D.C.; the Everglades Club of Palm Beach, and the Gulf Stream Club of Del Ray, Florida; the Augusta National Golf Club, Augusta, Georgia; and the Country Club, Oak Hill and Genesee Valley Club of Rochester, New York. The Millers also belonged to the Third Presbyterian Church, Rochester, New York. They continued to maintain their principal residence near Rochester, but following Miller’s retirement began to spend increasing amounts of time at their second home in Palm Beach, Florida.

== Later years ==
Miller remained active throughout the ensuing years despite personal tragedy. A little over a year after his retirement he suffered a stroke at his Palm Beach home in January 1980 that limited movement on the right side of his body, and affected his speech. Calvin Mayne, a friend and colleague of Miller’s at the Times-Union, later wrote that it was "a great tragedy" that after Miller retired, he and his wife, Louise, "had so little time to enjoy . . . his retirement." Miller’s successor as president and chief executive officer at Gannett, Al Neuharth, wrote about it in his autobiography: "The game of golf, which [Miller] loved so much, now provided him only memories. An unhappy termination of a brilliant career of a many-talented and multifaceted man." Nevertheless, Miller received an Honorary Doctor of Humane Letters degree in 1981 from the School of Journalism, University of Missouri-Columbia, Missouri Center for Professional Journalism. The Millers donated Paul’s papers to the Edmon Low Library, Stillwater, Oklahoma, in 1982; and that same year relocated permanently to Palm Beach, Florida, following the donation of their New York home to the Rochester Area Foundation. In 1986, the Gannett Foundation established a $1 million program in Miller’s name for reporting regional or local interest stories from the nation’s capital. Miller returned periodically throughout the 1980s to Oklahoma State University, and marked his final trip to the campus in 1988 with a visit to Old Central where he had worked as a public information officer in the 1930s

On August 19, 1991, Miller checked into Good Samaritan Hospital, Palm Beach, Florida, stricken with pneumonia. He died of cardiac arrest two days later at the age of 84. A close friend of Paul’s, former U.S. senator Harry F. Byrd Jr., later spoke at the memorial services held on August 28, 1991, at the Third Presbyterian Church in Rochester. And finally, a former friend and colleague of Miller’s from the Times-Union delivered the following eulogy: "A tall graceful, and handsome man, Miller had a manner so unassuming that it is sometimes difficult to understand that from the 1930s to the 1970s, he stood at the very heart of American journalism, quietly influencing it always to be more professional and more responsible. He clearly was one of the great journalists of his time."
