= Al Neuharth =

American businessman (1924–2013)

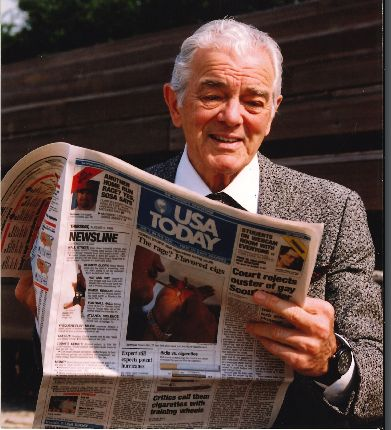
- Born: Allen Harold Neuharth; March 22, 1924; Eureka, South Dakota, U.S.
- Died: April 19, 2013 (aged 89); Cocoa Beach, Florida, U.S.
- Education: University of South Dakota
- Known for: Founder of USA Today

Allen Harold "Al" Neuharth (March 22, 1924 – April 19, 2013) was an American businessman, author, and columnist born in Eureka, South Dakota. He was the founder of USA Today, The Freedom Forum, and the Freedom Forum's Newseum.

== Early life ==
Al Neuharth was born in Eureka, South Dakota, to a German-speaking family. Neuharth's parents were Daniel J. and Christina, who married on January 11, 1922. Daniel died when Al was two. Al needed to help his family survive the Great Depression. He worked on his grandfather's farm. As a youngster; he also delivered the Minneapolis Tribune but he gave that up for a better-paying job in the meat industry, sweeping up in the meat plants and slaughtering animals. Neuharth graduated from Alpena High School in Alpena, South Dakota, where he worked for Allen Brigham, owner of the local newspaper, the Alpena Journal. At the age of 19, Neuharth served in the Army during World War II. As a member of the 86th Infantry Division, Neuharth was deployed to France, Germany, and the Philippines.

== Education ==
After the war, Neuharth attended the University of South Dakota in Vermillion, where he edited the school newspaper, The Volante. He maintained an affiliation with the university and had an office in the Media & Journalism building, the Al Neuharth Media Center, until he died in 2013. Neuharth founded the Al Neuharth Free Spirit Scholarship, awarded to graduating high school students who exemplify the qualities of a "free spirit" and aim to pursue a career in journalism.

== News career ==
Neuharth and fellow USD alum Bill Porter founded SoDak Sports, a weekly newspaper devoted to covering the sports scene in South Dakota. Despite its initial popularity, the weekly SoDak Sports went bankrupt in a year's time, losing Neuharth the $50,000 he had borrowed.

After his failure, Neuharth went to the Miami Herald, where he became assistant managing editor. In 1960, the Knight newspaper chain (later a part of Knight Ridder), which owned the Herald, sent him to its Detroit Free Press, which was fighting an uphill battle with the Detroit News, which Neuharth would later buy while at Gannett.

After Neuharth decided that he could go no further in the Knight organization due to the Knight family's control, in 1963, he accepted Gannett head Paul Miller's offer to move to Gannett's headquarters in Rochester, New York to run its paper there, the Democrat and Chronicle. In 1966, he took charge of Gannett Florida. He started Today in Cocoa, Florida, which eventually became Florida Today. The color schemes used in Florida Today became an inspiration for the initial format for USA Today. He then ran the boardroom under Miller, whom he eventually succeeded in 1973. He helped to build Gannett into the largest newspaper company in the United States. During his tenure, Gannett's revenues expanded by 1,450%. In 1979, Gannett owned 78 daily and 21 weekly newspapers, seven television stations, over a dozen radio stations, outdoor advertising plants, and the Louis Harris & Associates research firm. Gannett purchased Harris because the firm was doing costly research for Neuharth to determine the advisability of starting a new national newspaper.

== USA Today ==
Neuharth founded USA Today in 1982, which as of March 2013 was the third most widely read newspaper in the country. He won the Walter Cronkite Award for Excellence in Journalism in 1988, in recognition of his founding of the newspaper. Neuharth retired from Gannett on March 31, 1989, at the age of 65.

After his retirement, Neuharth authored a weekly column entitled Plain Talk through August 2010.

== Freedom Forum ==
Neuharth served as chairman of the board of the Gannett Foundation upon his retirement. The foundation was founded by Frank Gannett, founder of the newspaper chain. Neuharth took control of the foundation, removed the CEO, and installed his own top executive. He then renamed the foundation the Freedom Forum. Neuharth was chairman of the Freedom Forum from 1991 until he died in 2013.

The Freedom Forum annually gives out the Al Neuharth Award for Excellence in the Media. Past winners include Walter Cronkite (1989), Carl T. Rowan (1990), Helen Thomas (1991), Tom Brokaw (1992), Larry King (1993), Charles Kuralt of CBS (1994), Albert R. Hunt and Judy Woodruff (1995), Robert MacNeil (1996), Cokie Roberts (1997), Tim Russert and Louis Boccardi (1998), John Seigenthaler (1999), Jim Lehrer (2001), Tom Curley (2002), Don Hewitt of CBS (2004), Garrison Keillor (2005), Bob Schieffer of CBS (2006), John Quinn and Ken Paulson (2007), Charles Overby (2008), Katie Couric (2009), Brian Lamb of C-SPAN (2011) and Marilyn Hagerty of the Grand Forks Herald (2012).

== Quotes ==
"We in the media could help [the insurance situation] if we put in proper perspective long range hurricane forecasts that often are exaggerated and play into insurers' hands."

"The First Amendment guarantees a free press. We in the media must make sure it is a fair press."

== Personal ==
Neuharth had two children from his first marriage on June 16, 1946, to Loretta F. Helgeland. He was divorced in 1973. He married his second wife, Florida State Senator Lori Wilson, in 1973. Their marriage lasted seven years. He married Rachel Fornes, a Cocoa Beach, Florida, chiropractor, and they adopted six children.

In 1975, Neuharth built a beachfront mansion in Cocoa Beach. It contained 10,000 square feet (930 m^{2}) of living space, 11 bedrooms and 12 bathrooms. It was valued at several million dollars and was the largest in the city. It was sold after his death and was destroyed by fire in 2016.

Neuharth died on Friday, April 19, 2013, at his home in Cocoa Beach, at the age of 89. Jack Marsh, president of the Al Neuharth Media Center and a close friend, confirmed that he died at his home. Marsh said that Neuharth fell earlier in the week and never quite recovered.

== Awards and honors ==
- Bronze Star Medal
- Horatio Alger Award (1975)
- First male from the newspaper industry to win Association for Women in Communications' highest award, the Headliner Award
- Golden Plate Award of the American Academy of Achievement (1982)
- Walter Cronkite Award for Excellence in Journalism (1988)

== Books ==
- BusCapade: Plain Talk Across the USA. Washington, D.C.: USA Today Books, 1987, ISBN 0944347002
- Profiles of Power: How the Governors Run Our 50 States, with Kenneth A. Paulson and Phil Pruitt. Washington, D.C.: USA Today Books, 1988, ISBN 0944347142
- Truly One Nation, with Ken Paulson and Dan Greaney. New York: USA Today Books: Doubleday, 1988, ISBN 0385261802
- Window on the World: Faces, Places, and Plain Talk from 32 Countries. Washington, D.C.: USA Today Books, 1988, ISBN 0944347169
- Nearly One World, with Jack Kelley and Juan J. Walte. New York: USA Today Books/Doubleday, 1989, ISBN 0385263872
- Confessions of an S.O.B.. New York: Doubleday, 1989, ISBN 038524942X
- Free Spirit: How You Can Get the Most out of Life at Any Age...and How It Might Make You a Millionaire. Arlington, Va.: Newseum Books, 2000, ISBN 0965509184
