= Newseum =

Former news and journalism museum in Washington, D.C.

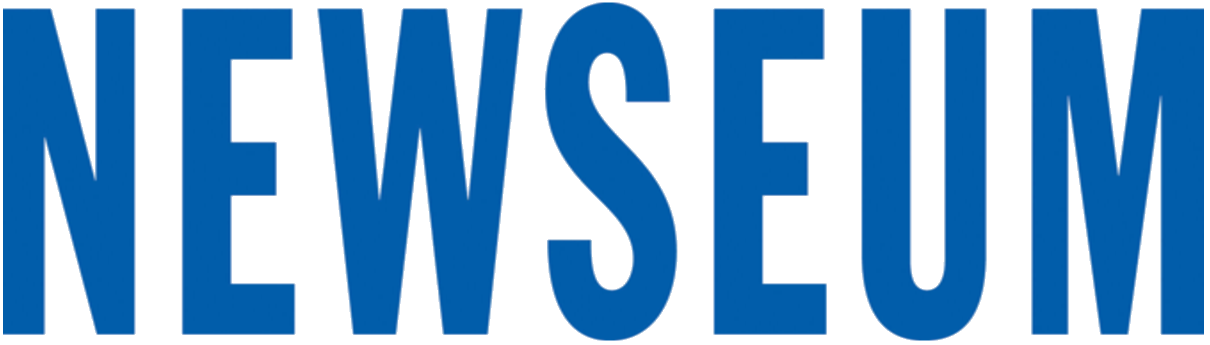

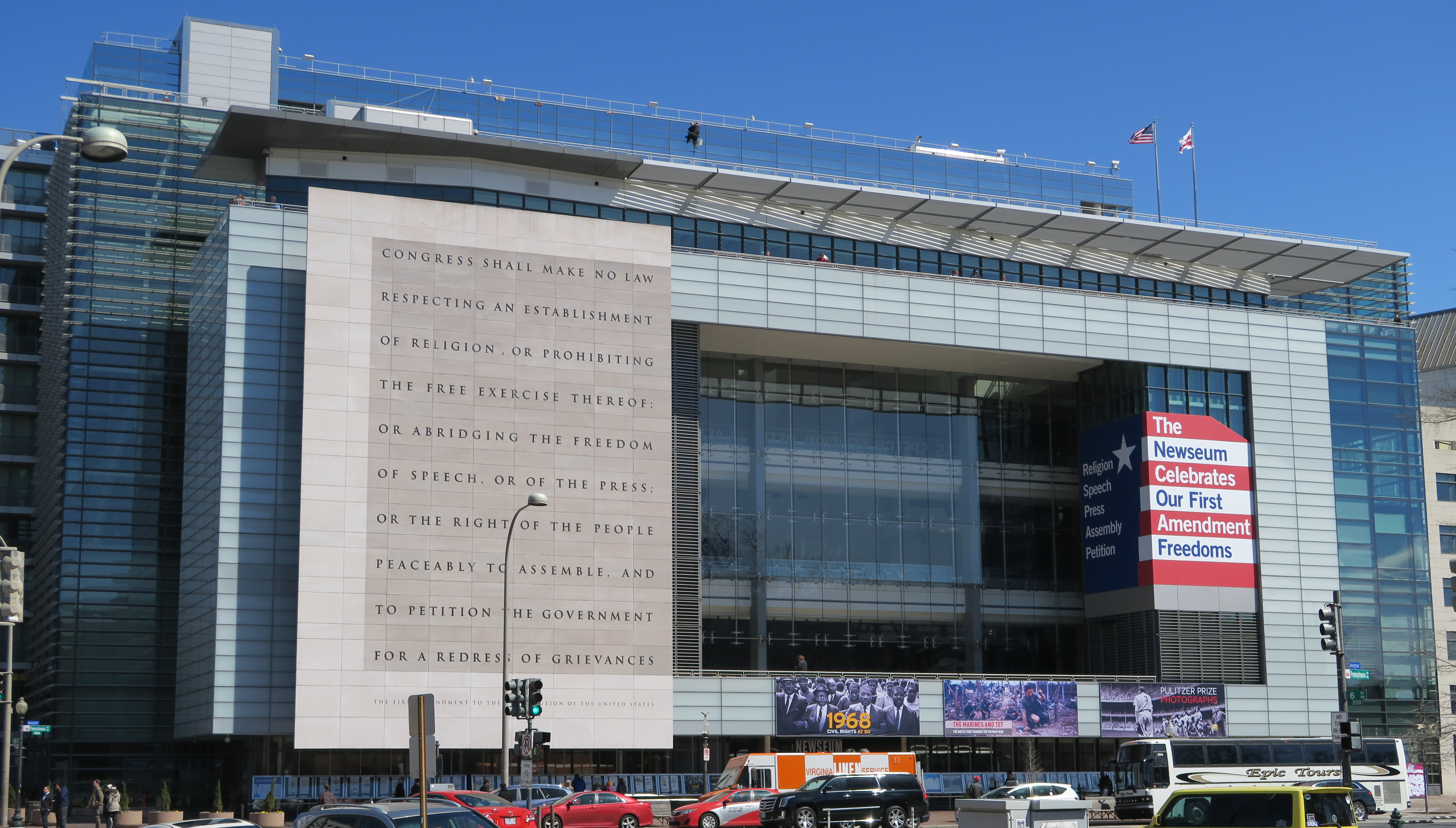
- Newseum in 2018

- Location of Newseum in Washington, D.C. Newseum (the United States)
- Established: April 18, 1997
- Dissolved: December 31, 2019
- Location: 555 Pennsylvania Avenue NW; Washington, D.C., United States
- Coordinates: 38.893219°N 77.01924°W
- Type: News and journalism museum
- Visitors: 855,000 (2017)
- Founder: Al Neuharth
- Executive director: Carrie Christoffersen
- Architect: James Stewart Polshek (Washington building)
- Website: newseum.org (archived)

The Newseum was an American museum dedicated to news, journalism, and the five freedoms protected by the First Amendment to the United States Constitution. Founded by publisher Al Neuharth and operated by the Freedom Forum, it was based in Rosslyn, Virginia, from 1997 to 2002 and at 555 Pennsylvania Avenue NW in Washington, D.C., from 2008 to 2019. Through historical artifacts, interactive exhibits and multimedia displays, the museum traced the development of news media from early printing to broadcasting and digital journalism.

The Washington museum occupied seven levels and 250,000 square feet (23,000 m^{2}) of exhibition space. At its opening, it contained 14 galleries, 15 theaters, two broadcast studios and more than 130 interactive stations. Major exhibits covered the Berlin Wall, the September 11 attacks, the history of news, Pulitzer Prize-winning photography, the First Amendment, press freedom around the world and the development of radio, television and the Internet. The Today's Front Pages Gallery displayed up to 80 U.S. and international newspaper front pages each day.

After years of financial losses, the Freedom Forum agreed in 2019 to sell the Pennsylvania Avenue property to Johns Hopkins University for $372.5 million. The museum closed on December 31, 2019. The former museum building was renovated and reopened in 2023 as the Johns Hopkins University Bloomberg Center. The Newseum's monumental First Amendment tablet was installed at the National Constitution Center in Philadelphia, while the Freedom Forum retained custody of the museum's permanent collection.

== History ==
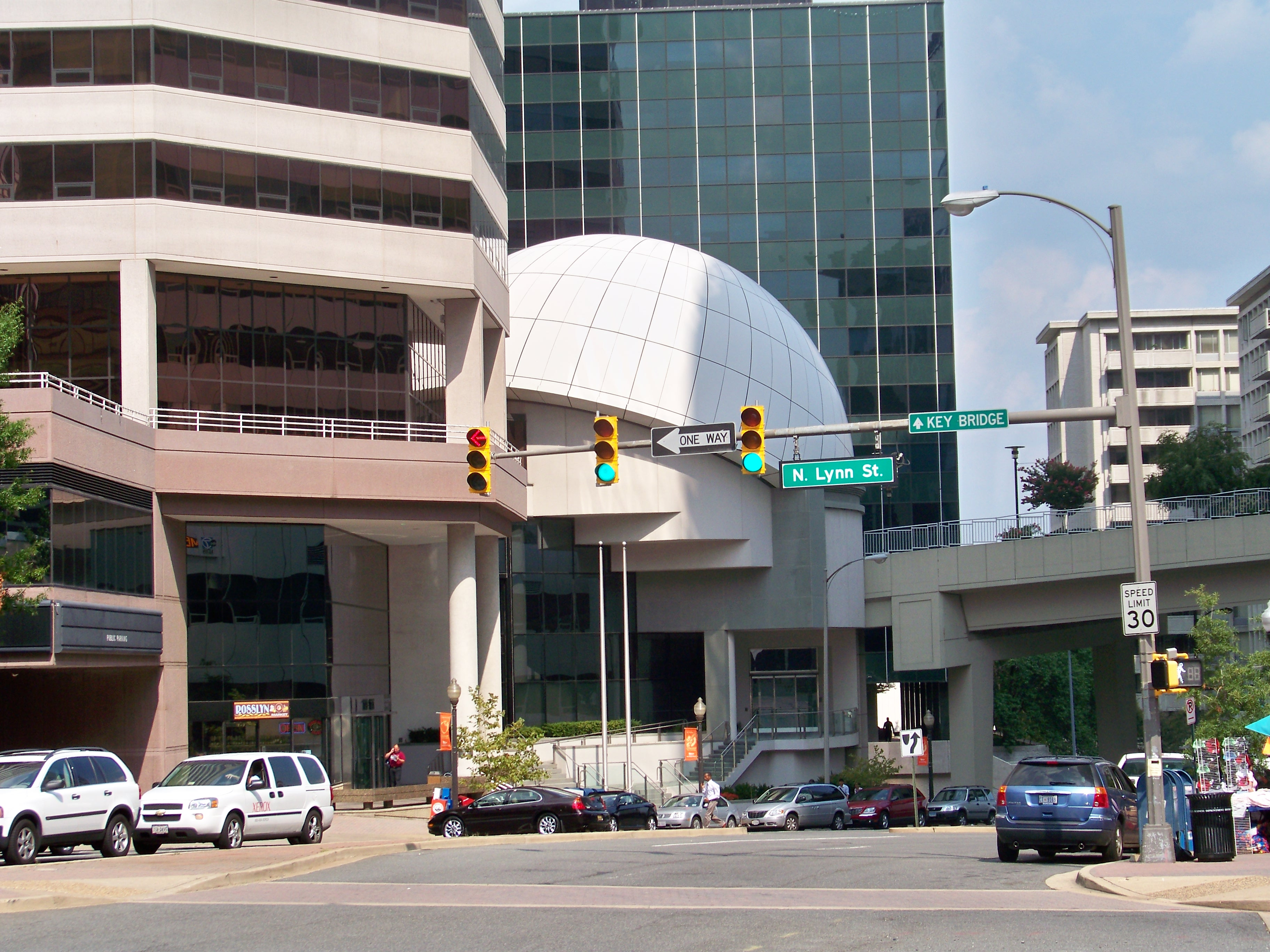
The Newseum's original location in Rosslyn, Virginia, where the museum operated from 1997 to 2002

The Freedom Forum was founded in 1991 by publisher Al Neuharth, founder of USA Today, and grew out of the Frank E. Gannett Newspaper Foundation. On April 18, 1997, it opened the first Newseum in Rosslyn. The museum attracted 2.25 million visitors during its five years there. Jerry W. Friedheim, the first executive director of the Newseum, devised its name.

By 2000, Freedom Forum leaders had concluded that the Rosslyn museum had outgrown its location and was too far from Washington's main tourist areas to draw many walk-in visitors. The organization decided to relocate the Newseum across the Potomac River to Washington, D.C. The Rosslyn museum closed in March 2002 while plans proceeded for a substantially larger facility.

The Freedom Forum acquired a site at Pennsylvania Avenue and Sixth Street NW from the District of Columbia for $100 million. Polshek Partnership Architects, led by James Stewart Polshek, was selected to design the building, while Ralph Appelbaum Associates, which had designed the exhibitions at the Rosslyn museum, was responsible for the exhibition design. The design was unveiled in October 2002. The Pennsylvania Avenue site was chosen in part for its symbolic location near federal buildings and the cultural institutions of the National Mall.

The Washington facility was originally scheduled to open in October 2007, but construction delays and additional time required to install and test its electronic systems postponed the opening. The Newseum reopened to the public on April 11, 2008. Its new home provided approximately three times as much exhibition space as the Rosslyn museum. It operated on Pennsylvania Avenue until its closure on December 31, 2019.

== Building and design ==
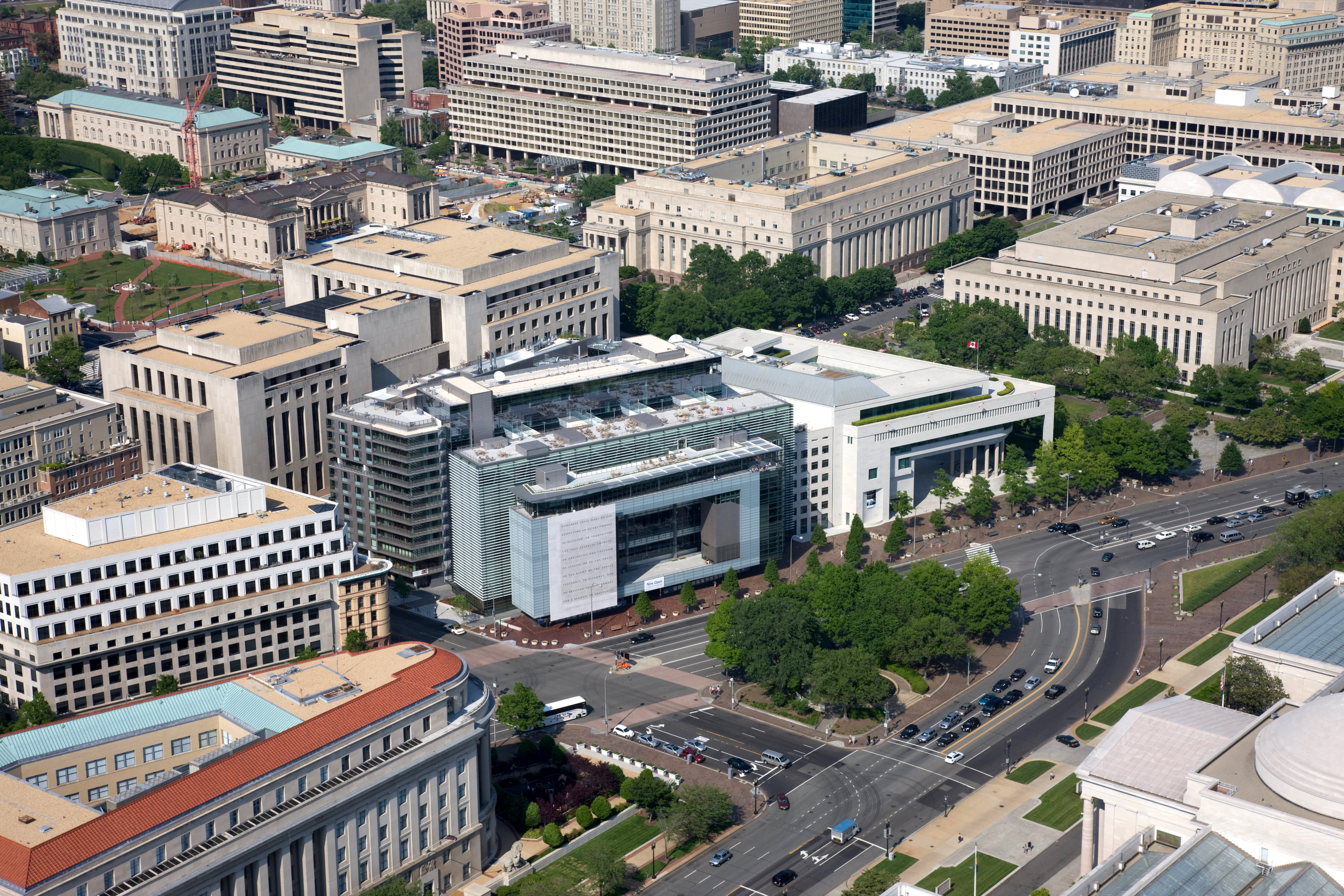
The Newseum's final location on Pennsylvania Avenue in Washington, D.C., where the museum operated from 2008 until its closure in 2019

The Newseum occupied approximately 250,000 square feet (23,000 m^{2}) of exhibition space across seven levels within a 643,000-square-foot (59,700 m^{2}) mixed-use development designed by Polshek Partnership Architects. It contained 14 galleries, 15 theaters and two broadcast studios. A 90-foot (27 m) atrium formed the center of the building, and visitors followed a route of approximately 1.5 miles (2.4 km) through the museum. Leslie E. Robertson Associates served as structural engineer for the building and its exhibits.

The design consisted of three layered volumes parallel to Pennsylvania Avenue, rising progressively in height; the architects likened the layers to pages of a newspaper. The Pennsylvania Avenue façade was predominantly glass, intended to symbolize the openness of the press and democracy. Beside the entrance stood a 74-foot (23 m), 50-ton tablet of Tennessee marble engraved with the 45 words of the First Amendment.

A large rectangular opening in the façade, described by Polshek as a "window on the world", allowed passersby on Pennsylvania Avenue to see visitors circulating through the atrium and glimpses of the large media screen inside. Visitor areas were also arranged to provide views toward the Capitol and the National Mall.

In addition to museum space, the development contained offices for the Freedom Forum, 136 rental apartments and The Source, a restaurant operated by Wolfgang Puck. One of the museum's broadcast studios housed ABC's This Week from 2008 to 2013 and was subsequently used by Al Jazeera America for its Washington bureau.

== Exhibitions ==
The Newseum combined historical artifacts with films, digital displays, theaters and interactive exhibits. When the Washington museum opened in 2008, it contained 14 galleries, 15 theaters and more than 130 interactive stations. Its more than 6,200 artifacts included objects associated with major events in the history of journalism and news media. In addition to its permanent displays, the museum presented changing and traveling exhibitions throughout its years in Washington.

=== Permanent galleries and displays ===
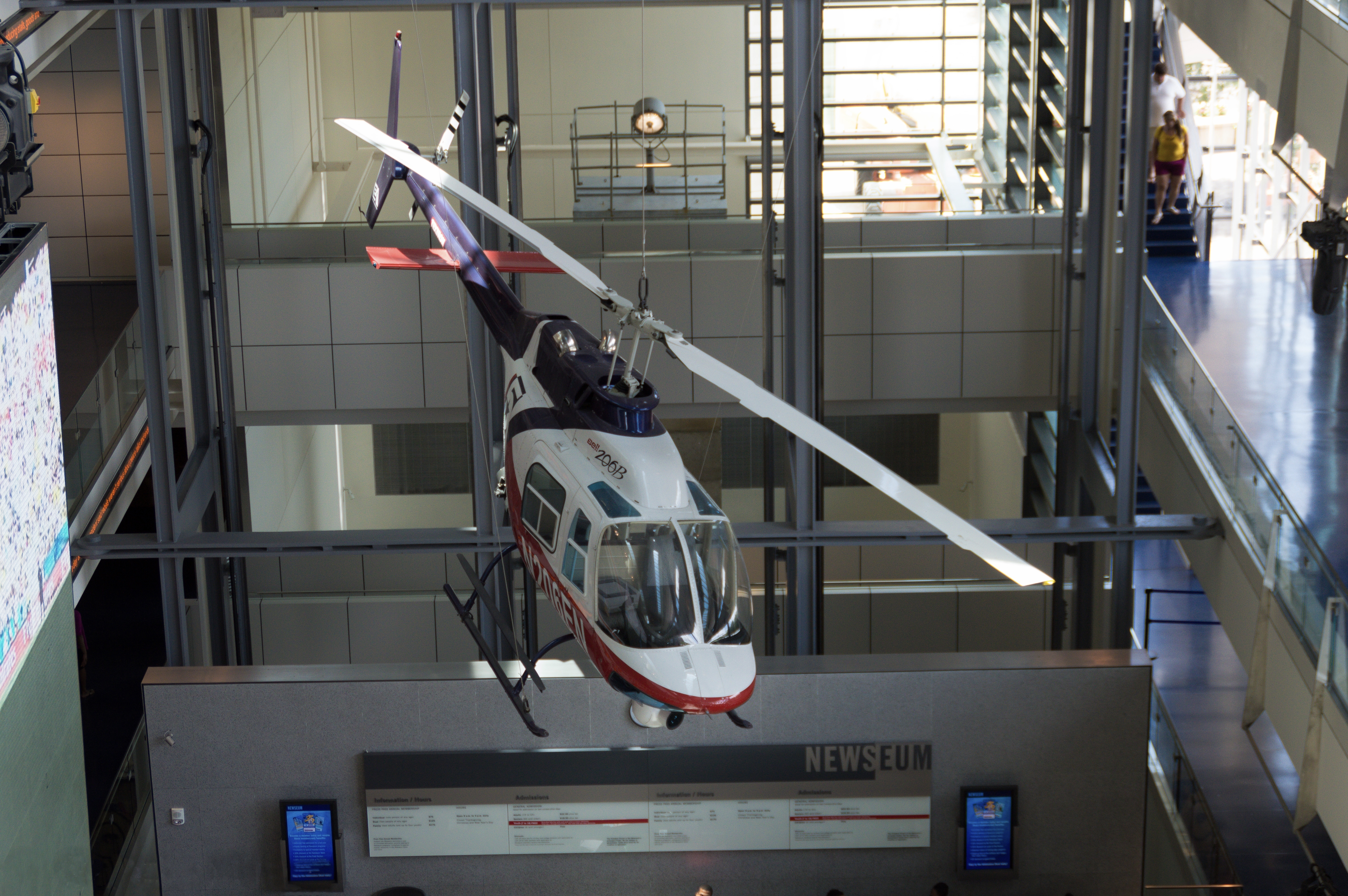
A Bell 206B JetRanger III news helicopter suspended in the Great Hall

The New York Times–Ochs-Sulzberger Family Great Hall occupied the museum's 90-foot (27 m) central atrium. A 40-by-22-foot (12.2 m × 6.7 m) high-definition screen presented news and material related to the museum's mission, while electronic news displays carried continuously updated headlines. A replica communications satellite and a Bell 206 news helicopter were suspended above the hall.

The Today's Front Pages Gallery presented a changing selection of newspaper front pages from around the world. By 2019, the Newseum received more than 800 front pages electronically each day and enlarged 80 for display; the selection included newspapers from across the United States and other countries. Selected front pages were also displayed in cases outside the Pennsylvania Avenue entrance. The project continued online after the museum's closure under the Freedom Forum.

The 8,000-square-foot (740 m^{2}) News Corporation News History Gallery was the museum's largest permanent gallery and covered more than 500 years of news history. Its central timeline displayed nearly 400 historic newspaper front pages, newsbooks and magazines, while interactive displays gave access to digitized publications and information about journalists. Other displays examined subjects including war reporting, sensationalism, media credibility and journalistic objectivity. Items displayed included a 1603 English broadsheet reporting the coronation of James I, a 1787 issue of the Maryland Gazette containing the proposed United States Constitution, an 1860 extra edition of The Charleston Mercury announcing the dissolution of the Union, and the erroneous 1948 Chicago Daily Tribune front page proclaiming "Dewey Defeats Truman".

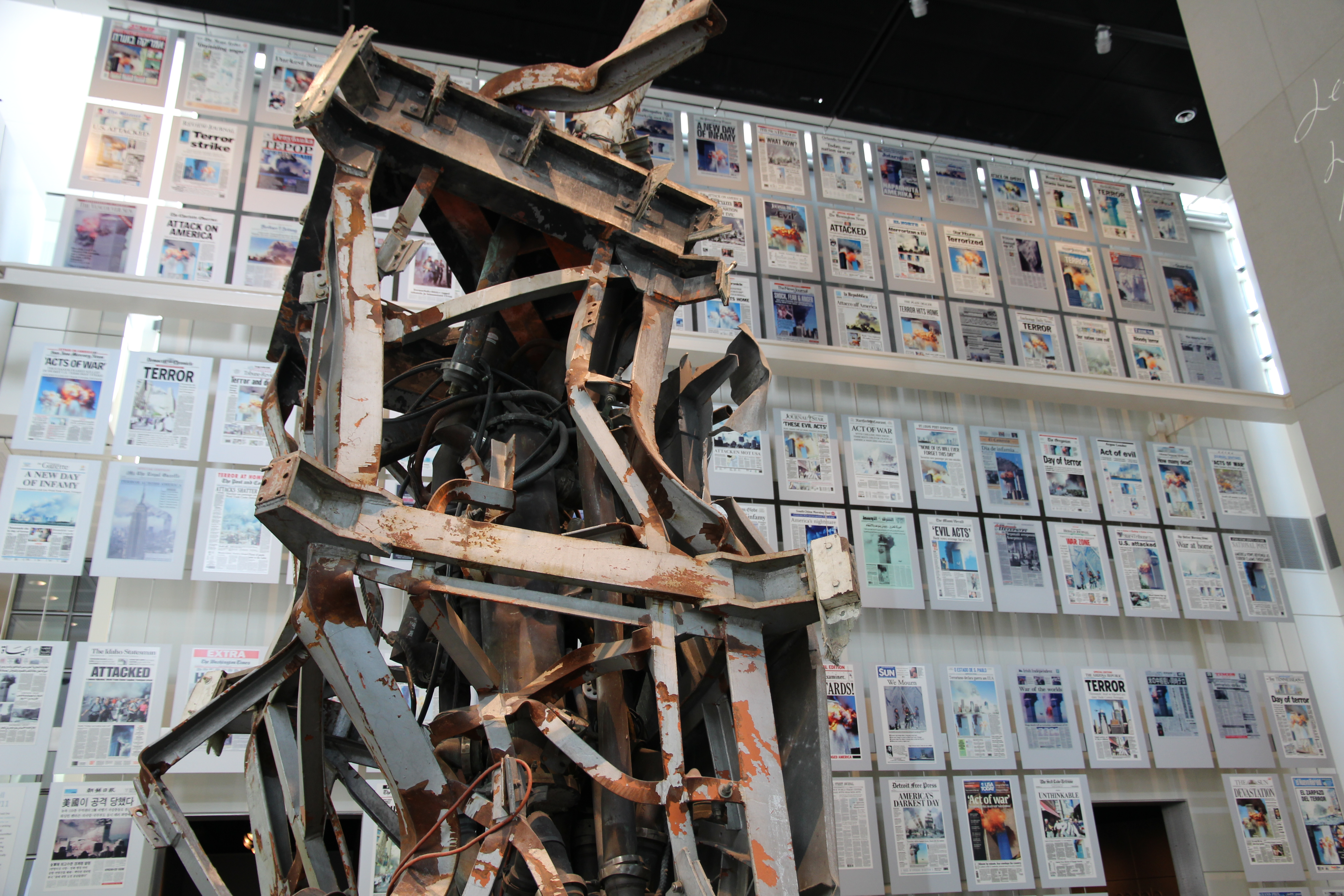
A section of the World Trade Center antenna mast displayed in the 9/11 Gallery

The 9/11 Gallery examined news coverage of the September 11 attacks through artifacts, photographs, newspaper front pages and accounts from journalists who covered the attacks. Its principal artifacts included the upper section of the broadcast antenna from the World Trade Center's North Tower and a piece of fuselage from United Airlines Flight 93. The gallery also commemorated photojournalist Bill Biggart, the only journalist killed while covering the attacks, and displayed his cameras, press credentials and personal effects. The antenna stood against a display of newspaper front pages published after the attacks.

The Berlin Wall Gallery contained eight intact 12-foot (3.7 m) sections of the Berlin Wall, together forming the largest display of unaltered sections of the wall outside Germany, and a three-story East German BT-9 observation tower that had stood near Checkpoint Charlie. The exhibit examined the role of news and information in the fall of the Berlin Wall.

The Pulitzer Prize Photographs Gallery displayed photographs from every Pulitzer Prize-winning photography entry since the first photography prize was awarded in 1942. Interactive displays provided access to more than 1,000 photographs and approximately 15 hours of interviews with prize-winning photographers. Among the photographs exhibited were Joe Rosenthal's Raising the Flag on Iwo Jima, images from the Vietnam War and photographs documenting other major news events.

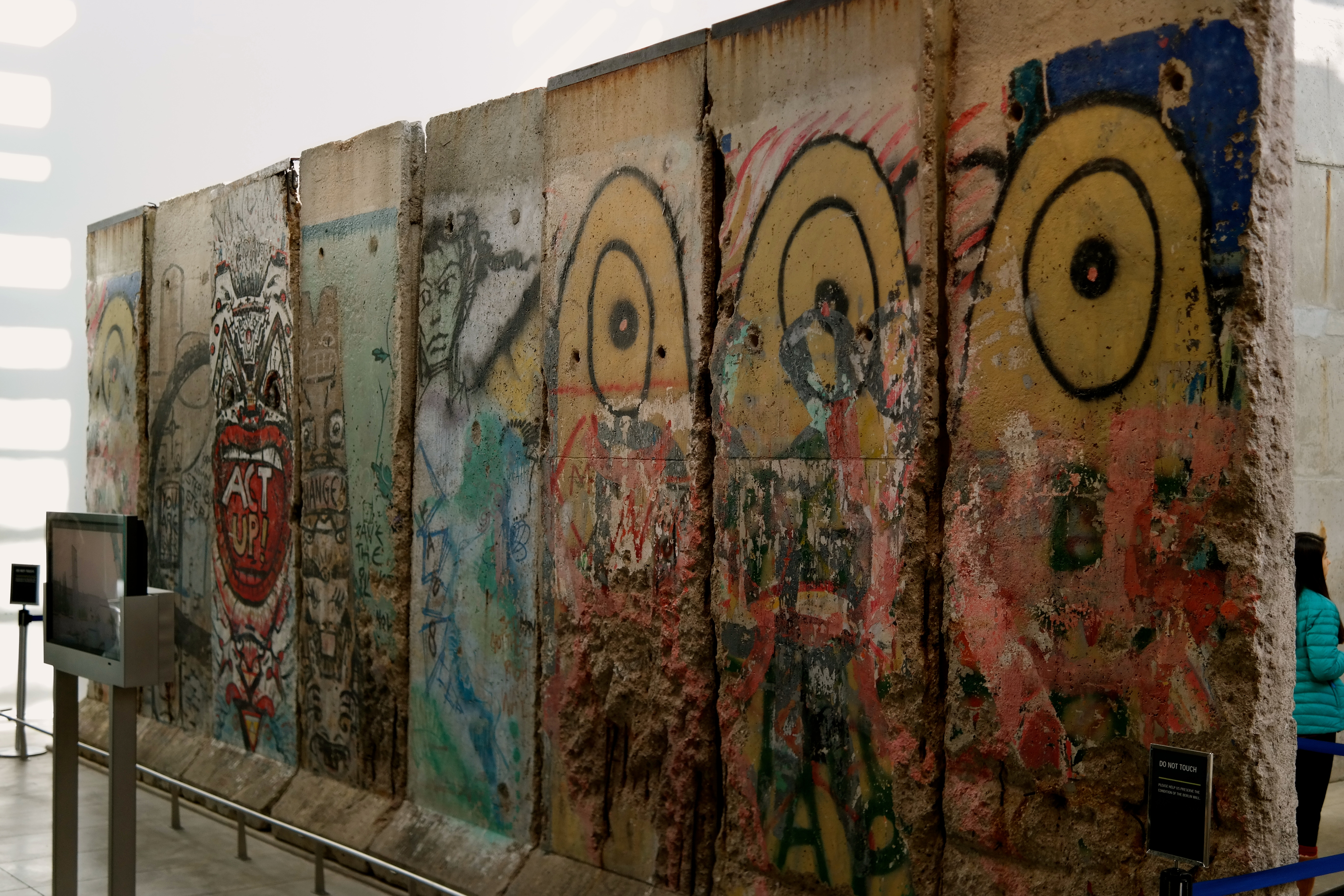
Sections of the Berlin Wall displayed in the Berlin Wall Gallery

The Cox Enterprises First Amendment Gallery examined the five freedoms protected by the First Amendment—religion, speech, press, assembly and petition—and placed their development and interpretation in historical context. The Pulliam Family History of Liberty Gallery connected news with American political history. Its "1776 — Breaking News: Independence" display included one of 19 known copies of the July 6, 1776 issue of The Pennsylvania Evening Post, the first newspaper to publish the Declaration of Independence.

Several galleries examined the production and distribution of news. The Bloomberg Internet, TV and Radio Gallery traced the development of electronic media through a timeline containing more than 70 radio and television news clips. Two media walls, each 25 feet (7.6 m) high, presented notable events in broadcast history, while other displays examined changing communications technology and broadcaster Edward R. Murrow. The 7,000-square-foot (650 m^{2}) NBC News Interactive Newsroom allowed visitors to prepare a simulated newspaper front page or deliver a television report from a teleprompter.

The museum also displayed the CONUS 1 Satellite Truck, developed in 1984 by Hubbard Broadcasting and CONUS Communications. The Newseum described it as the world's first satellite newsgathering vehicle, allowing local television stations to transmit live reports from around the country without relying on their television networks.

The Time Warner World News Gallery examined journalism outside the United States and restrictions on freedom of the press. A 36-foot (11 m) map, updated annually, compared levels of press freedom around the world, while the "Dateline: Danger" display addressed threats faced by journalists working in conflict zones or under repressive governments. The gallery also displayed the laptop computer and passport of The Wall Street Journal reporter Daniel Pearl, who was kidnapped and killed while reporting in Pakistan. The Bancroft Family Ethics Center used an Ethics Table and interactive kiosks to present visitors with real-life reporting and media-ethics dilemmas.

In a special alcove on Level 4, the museum displayed the bomb-damaged 1976 Datsun 710 belonging to The Arizona Republic investigative reporter Don Bolles, who died from injuries sustained when a bomb exploded beneath his car in Phoenix in 1976.

=== Journalists Memorial ===
The Journalists Memorial commemorated reporters, editors, photographers and broadcasters who died while reporting the news. The original memorial was dedicated at Freedom Park in Arlington, Virginia, in 1996; a new two-story glass memorial was created for the Washington Newseum in 2008. It was updated annually, and by 2019 bore the names of 2,344 journalists. The accompanying gallery displayed photographs of hundreds of those commemorated and provided searchable information about each person through electronic kiosks.

Beneath the memorial were trace remains of photojournalists Larry Burrows, Henri Huet, Kent Potter and Keisaburo Shimamoto, who were killed when their helicopter was shot down over Laos in 1971; after the Newseum closed, the remains were returned to the Defense POW/MIA Accounting Agency.

The memorial became the subject of controversy in May 2013 over plans to add the names of Hussam Salama and Mahmoud al-Kumi, cameramen for Al-Aqsa TV who had been killed in an Israeli airstrike in the Gaza Strip in 2012. Critics opposed their inclusion because Al-Aqsa TV was run by Hamas and had been designated a terrorist entity by the United States government. The Newseum initially defended its decision, noting that the Committee to Protect Journalists, Reporters Without Borders and the World Association of Newspapers and News Publishers regarded the two men as journalists killed in the line of duty. Their names were not added to the wall at the 2013 rededication, and the museum said it would re-evaluate their inclusion.

=== Changing and traveling exhibitions ===
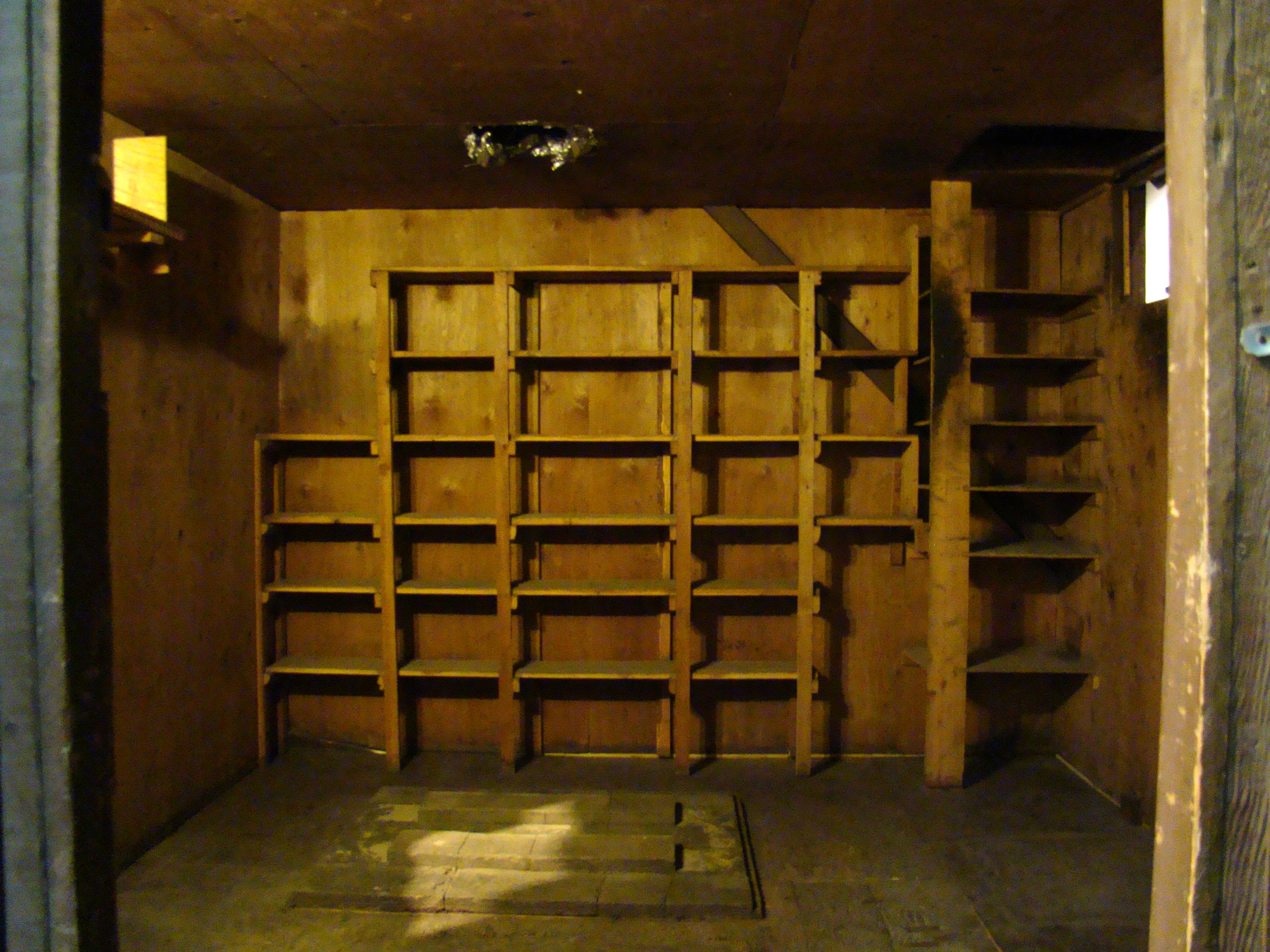
Ted Kaczynski's cabin on display in the Newseum

The Newseum presented dozens of temporary exhibitions during its years in Washington. These covered subjects including Hurricane Katrina, presidential photography, the assassination of Abraham Lincoln, the Vietnam War, the civil rights movement, editorial cartooning and the work of individual journalists. Among the longer-running exhibitions was "Civil Rights at 50", a changing six-year exhibit presented from 2013 to 2019 that examined the relationship between news media and the civil rights movement. Other exhibitions included "Covering Katrina" (2010–2011), "JFK" (2013–2014), "Reporting Vietnam" (2015–2016), "Louder Than Words: Rock, Power and Politics" (2017) and "The Marines and Tet: The Battle That Changed the Vietnam War" (2018–2019).

An ABC News Changing Exhibits gallery was used for rotating displays. Its final exhibition, "Inside Today's FBI", examined the Federal Bureau of Investigation's work on terrorism and cybercrime and retained several objects from an earlier FBI exhibition, including Ted Kaczynski's cabin and aircraft debris from United Airlines Flight 175.

Other changing exhibitions on display during the museum's final year included "Rise Up: Stonewall and the LGBTQ Rights Movement", marking 50 years since the Stonewall riots; "Seriously Funny: From the Desk of The Daily Show with Jon Stewart", examining the program's influence on American politics and the press; "Make Some Noise: Students and the Civil Rights Movement"; and an exhibition of Darrin Bell's 2019 Pulitzer Prize-winning editorial cartoons. "Seriously Funny" included more than 50 artifacts and Jon Stewart's desk from The Daily Show.

The Newseum also developed traveling versions of several exhibitions. At the time of the Washington museum's closure, traveling exhibitions included subjects such as John F. Kennedy, rock music, the Stonewall riots and Pulitzer Prize-winning photojournalism; the Freedom Forum said these exhibitions would continue to be shown at other museums after the Pennsylvania Avenue location closed.

== Critical reception ==
The Newseum's Washington location received mixed reviews, with critics often praising its interactive presentation while questioning aspects of its tone and architecture. Alan Rusbridger of The Guardian found the museum engaging and praised the Berlin Wall display and the building itself, while criticizing some artifacts as trivial and regarding its presentation of journalism as self-important and strongly American-centered. Bonnie Wach of the San Francisco Chronicle praised the extensive use of interactive and multimedia technology, particularly the touch screens, studios, games and hands-on news-production activities.

The building's architecture also received divided assessments. Nicolai Ouroussoff, architecture critic for The New York Times, criticized the design as symptomatic of what he regarded as shortcomings in contemporary architecture in Washington. Architectural Record similarly noted mixed local reaction: architect Roger K. Lewis praised the building as aesthetically compelling and thoughtful urban design, while The Washington Post architecture critic Philip Kennicott argued that its numerous forms and visual elements produced a discordant composition.

Reviewing the museum's content for The New York Times, Edward Rothstein regarded it as an effective combination of education and entertainment but argued that its celebratory presentation of journalism warranted skepticism. In a retrospective published shortly before the museum closed in 2019, Kennicott characterized the Newseum as a product of an optimistic era in journalism and early digital culture whose upbeat conception of the news industry had become increasingly removed from the economic and political crises facing journalism. He nevertheless concluded that many of its exhibitions remained engaging and substantial and that its highly interactive approach had become influential in museum design.

== Financial losses and closure ==
Unlike the original Rosslyn museum, which offered free admission, the Washington Newseum charged an entrance fee. Its operators initially projected annual attendance of one million, drawing comparisons with the much larger audiences of nearby Smithsonian Institution museums. Adult admission eventually reached approximately $25, and the museum never met its attendance target; its highest annual attendance was 855,000 in 2017. Over its more than 11 years on Pennsylvania Avenue, the Newseum attracted approximately 10 million visitors.

The cost of constructing and operating the Washington facility placed substantial pressure on the Freedom Forum's finances. The organization borrowed $350 million to finance construction, and the project's cost eventually reached $477 million. From 2008 through 2017, the Newseum recorded a deficit every year despite receiving an average annual subsidy of $29 million from the Freedom Forum. During the same period, rental and catering revenue averaged $15.2 million annually, more than twice the revenue generated by admissions. The Great Recession began just months before the Washington museum opened, reducing admissions and donations, while contraction and consolidation in the news industry diminished support from some of the museum's traditional donors.

As its financial difficulties continued, the Newseum made five rounds of staff cuts between 2009 and 2017. In February 2018, The Washington Post reported that the Freedom Forum was considering selling the Pennsylvania Avenue building or moving the museum to a less expensive location; the foundation was then contributing more than $20 million annually toward the museum's operating expenses.

In January 2019, the Freedom Forum announced that Johns Hopkins University would purchase the property for $372.5 million. The Newseum remained open through the end of that year and closed to the public on December 31, 2019. At the time of closure, the Newseum said that artifacts it owned would be transferred to storage and that objects on loan would be returned to their lenders.

== Legacy ==
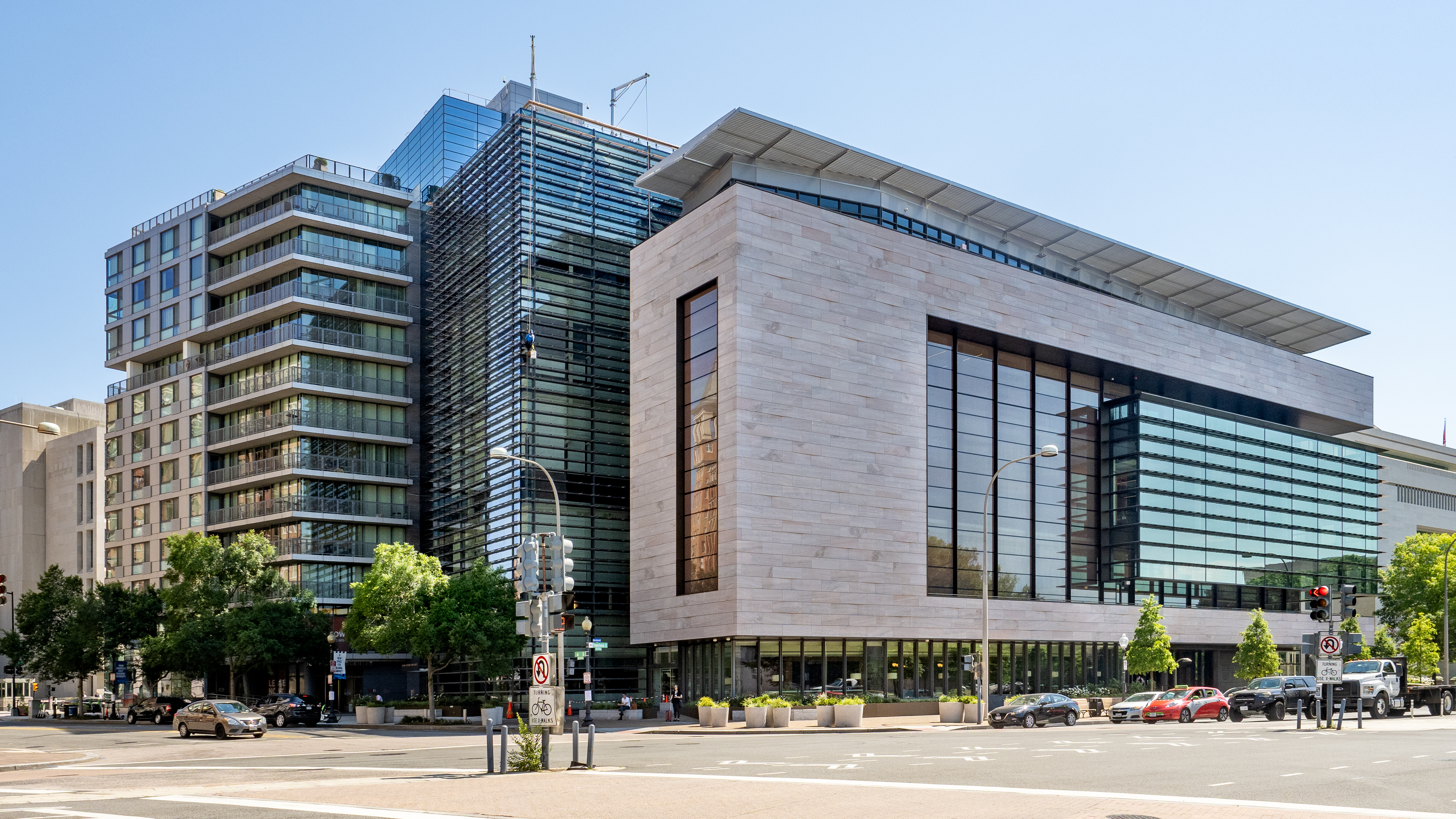
The former Newseum building in 2024, after its conversion into the Johns Hopkins University Bloomberg Center

Johns Hopkins University undertook a $275 million renovation of the former Newseum building, bringing the combined purchase and renovation cost to nearly $650 million. The building reopened in 2023 as the Johns Hopkins University Bloomberg Center, accommodating the School of Advanced International Studies, the Carey Business School and other university divisions and programs. The renovation converted the former museum into a 435,000-square-foot (40,400 m^{2}) academic center while retaining features including its central atrium.

The Newseum's First Amendment tablet was removed from the Pennsylvania Avenue façade during the redevelopment. The Freedom Forum donated the 50-ton Tennessee marble tablet to the National Constitution Center in Philadelphia, where installation was completed in January 2022 on a 100-foot (30 m) wall overlooking Independence Mall. The tablet was formally dedicated on May 2, 2022.

The Freedom Forum remained custodian of the Newseum's permanent collection after the museum closed. In early 2025, it began a comprehensive review of the collection, including a full inventory and revisions to its collections-management policies. The organization decided to retain objects closely aligned with its mission of promoting First Amendment freedoms while deaccessioning a significant portion of the collection for transfer to other institutions that could preserve the objects and return them to public use. The process was continuing through 2026.

The Newseum's closure also ended public access to its Journalists Memorial. The Fallen Journalists Memorial Foundation, established in 2019 following the Capital Gazette shooting, has cited both that attack and the subsequent closure of the Newseum as reasons for pursuing a permanent national memorial to journalists killed while reporting. Congress authorized the privately funded memorial on federal land in December 2020. The United States Commission of Fine Arts approved a revised design concept in January 2025, and the National Capital Planning Commission approved preliminary site development plans in December 2025 for a site at Independence Avenue, Maryland Avenue and Third Street SW, near the National Mall. The project entered its construction-documents phase in January 2026, with the foundation targeting a 2028 dedication.

== Gallery ==
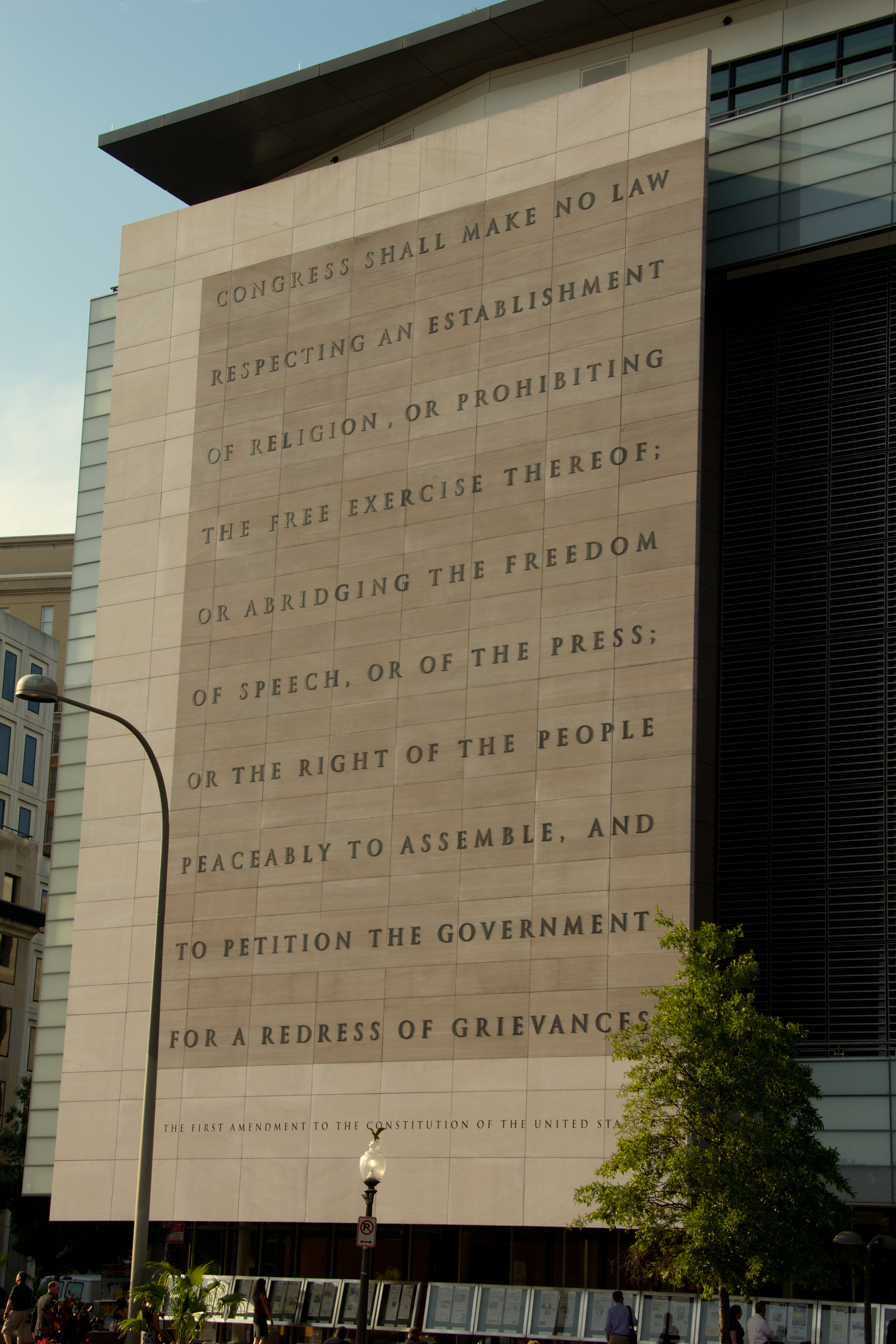
The First Amendment tablet on the Pennsylvania Avenue façade

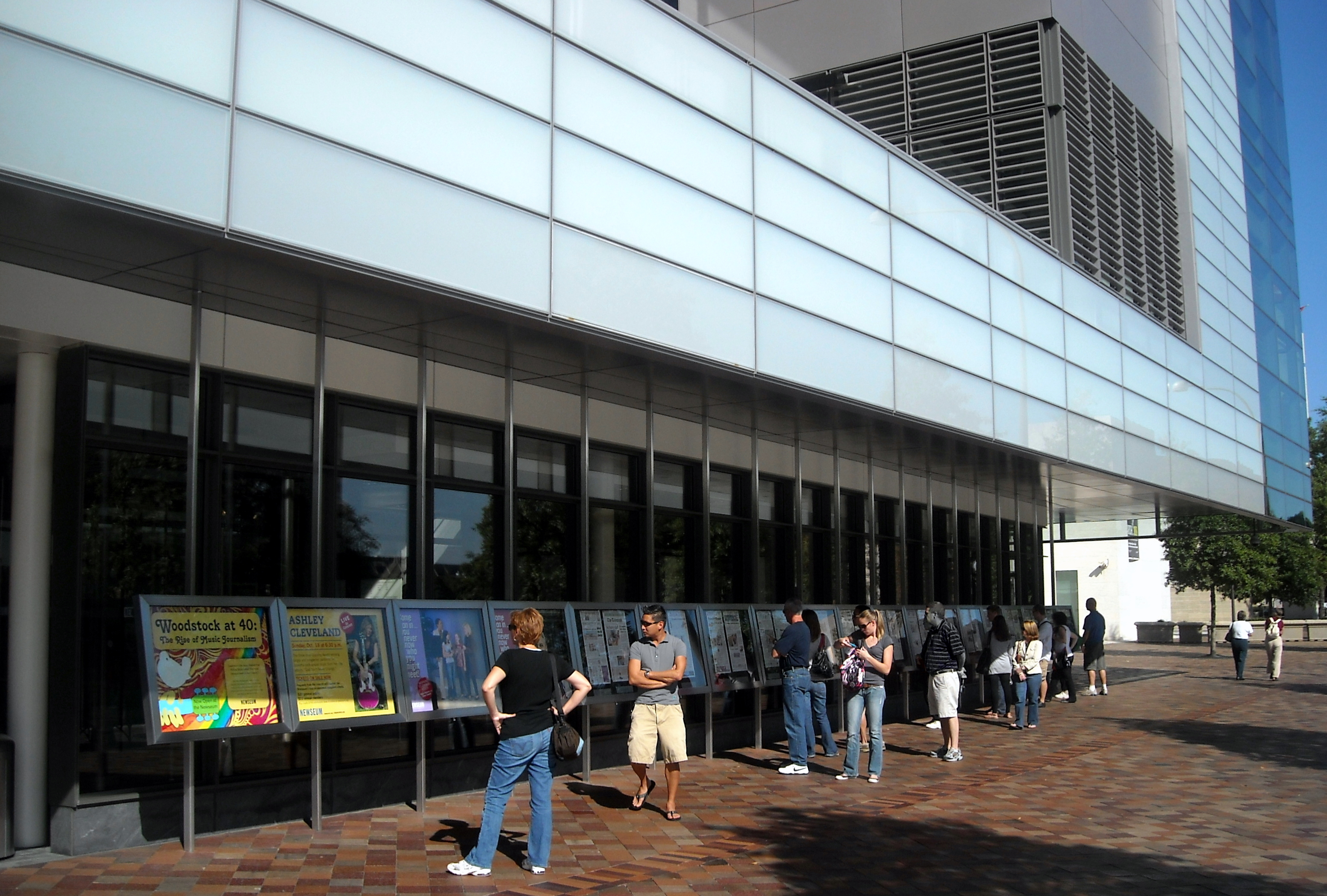
Newspaper front pages displayed outside the Pennsylvania Avenue entrance

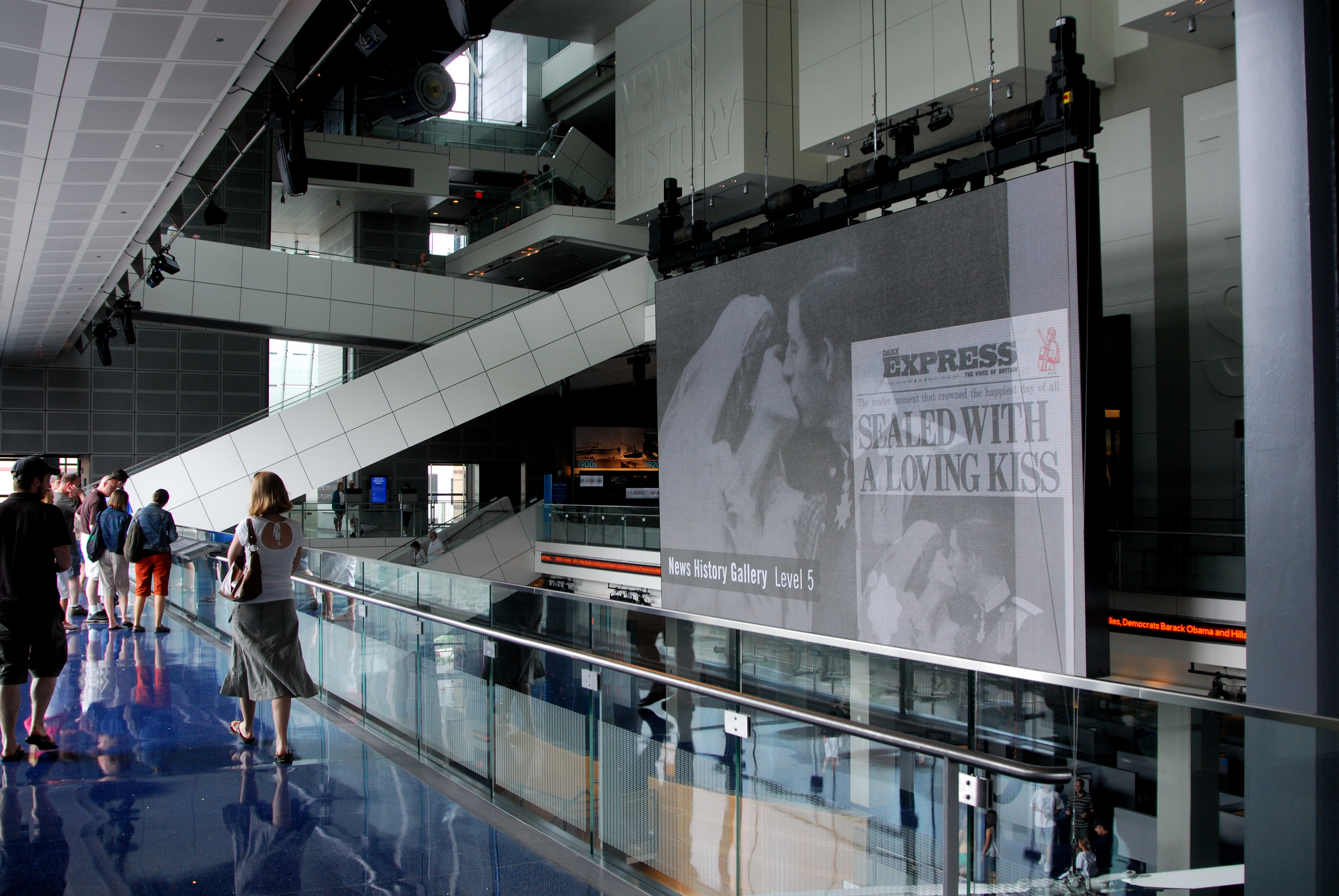
The large video screen in the Great Hall

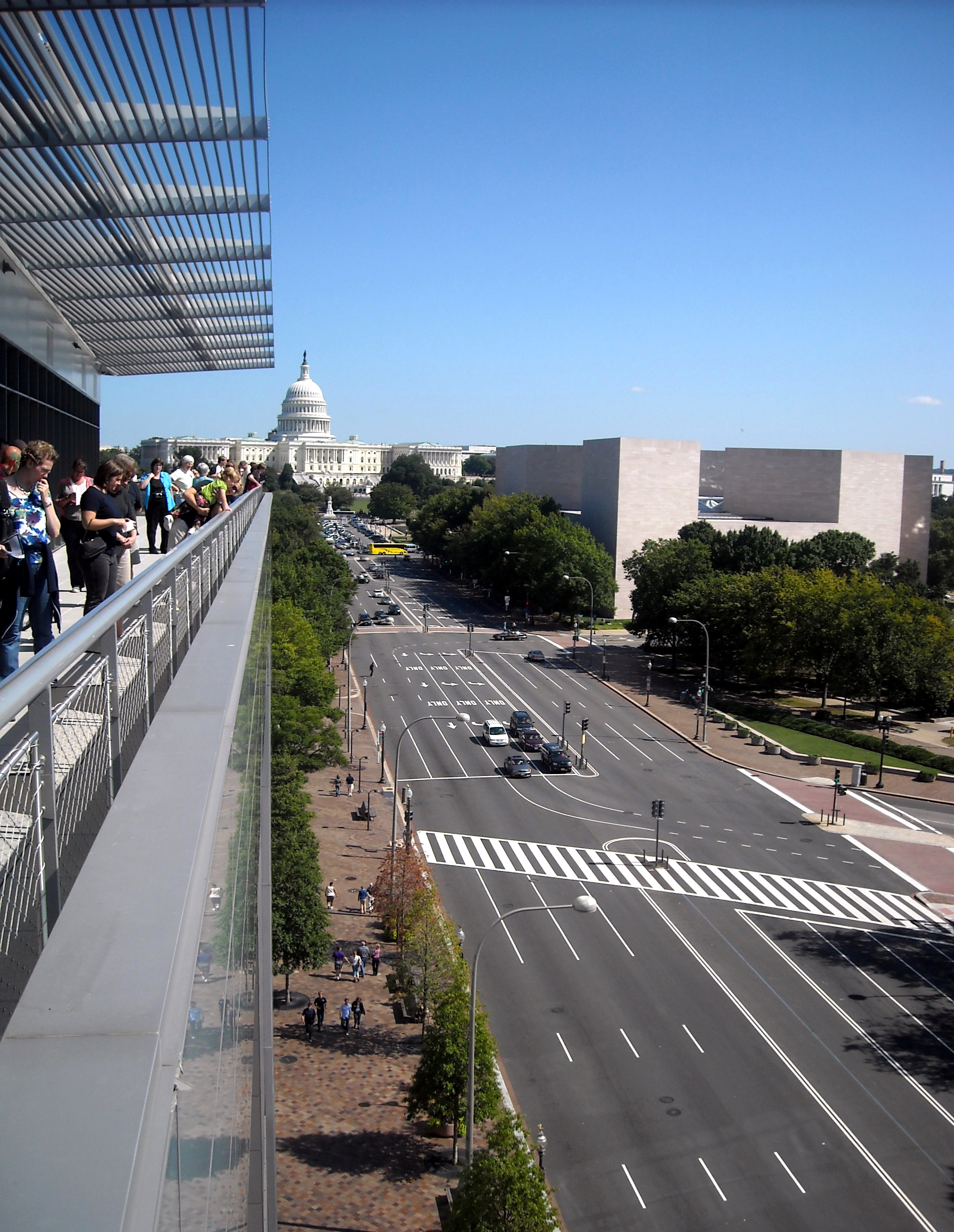
Hank Greenspun Terrace overlooking Pennsylvania Avenue

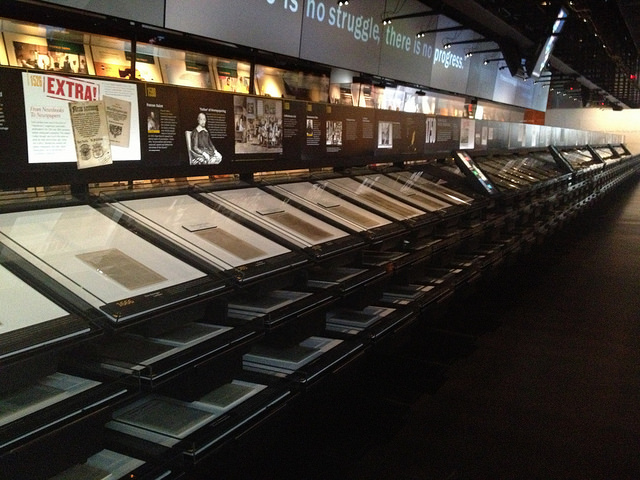
Historic newspapers in the News History Gallery

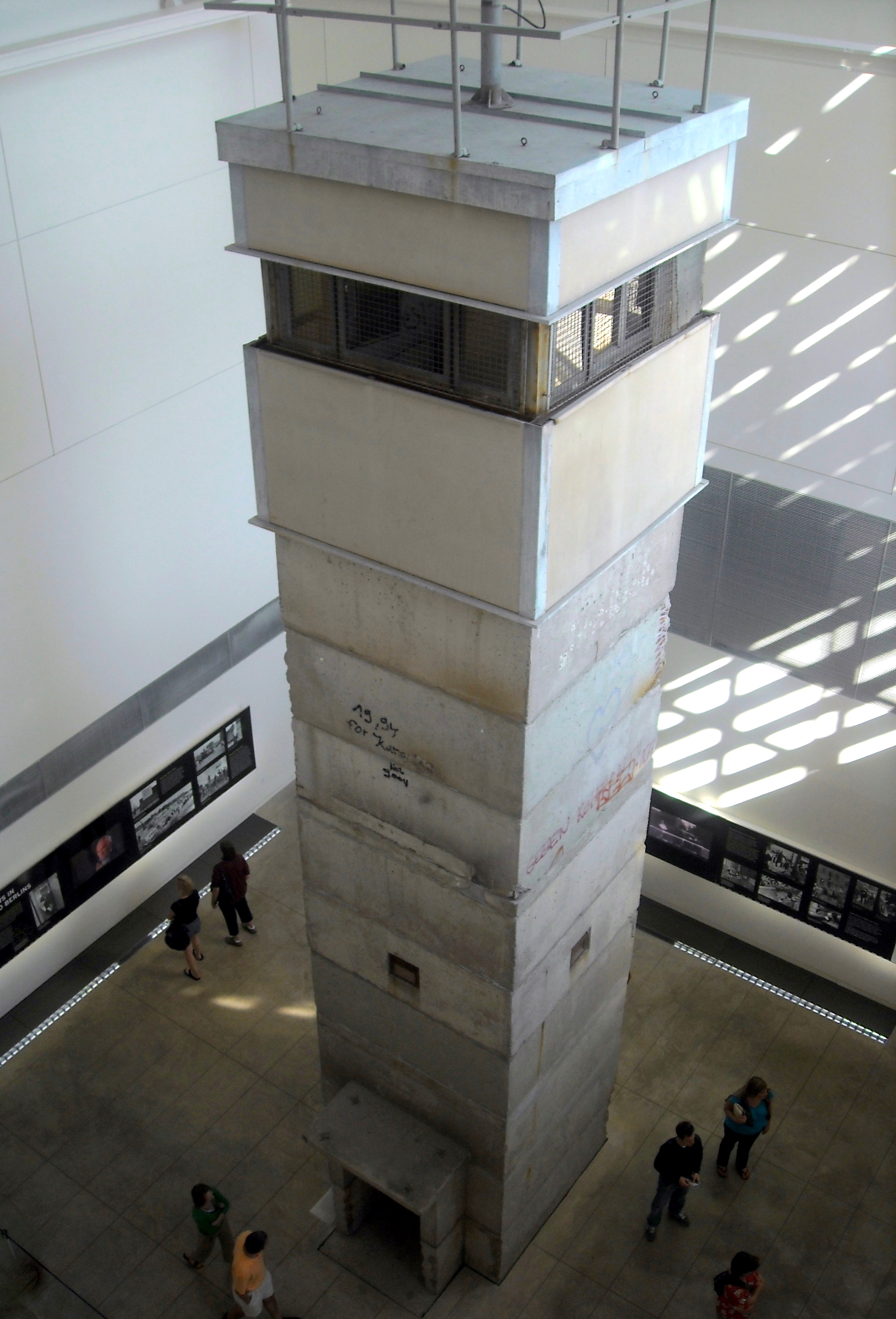
East German BT-9 observation tower displayed in the Berlin Wall Gallery

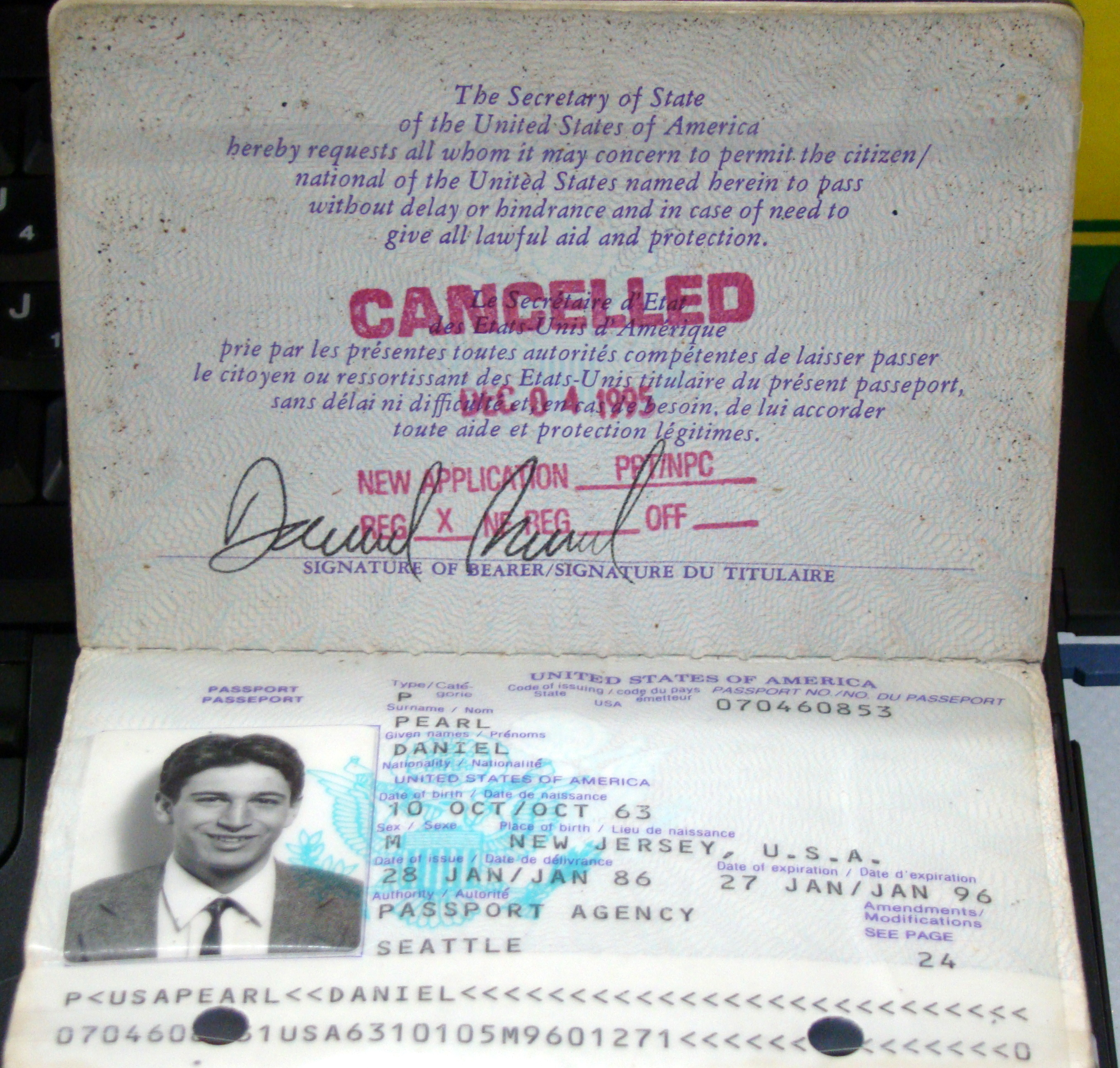
Daniel Pearl's passport on display

== See also ==
- List of museums in Washington, D.C.
