= Freedom Forum =

United States nonprofit organization

The Freedom Forum is a nonpartisan 501(c)(3) foundation dedicated to fostering First Amendment freedoms for all. The organization advances First Amendment freedoms through programs that include Today's Front Pages, the annual Al Neuharth Free Spirit and Journalism Conference for high school juniors, annual First Amendment Festival, Free Expression Awards and other conferences. Freedom Forum operated the Newseum in Washington, D.C. until 2019, when it closed the museum, sent most artifacts back to their owners, and sold the building to Johns Hopkins University.

The Freedom Forum was founded in 1991 when the Gannett Foundation, started by publisher Frank E. Gannett as a charitable foundation to aid communities where his company had newspapers, sold its name and assets back to Gannett Company for $670 million. Retired Gannett chairman and USA Today newspaper founder Al Neuharth used the proceeds to found the Freedom Forum. Its original mission was to foster "free press, free speech and free spirit."

Neuharth's daughter, Jan A. Neuharth, is chief executive officer and chair of the Freedom Forum.

Today, the organization trains, teaches, and surveys students, educators, journalists and journalism educators, and community leaders to promote free expression, First Amendment awareness and storytelling, and inclusive newsroom culture. The Freedom Forum's vision is "an America where everyone knows, values and defends the freedoms of religion, speech, press, assembly and petition." The Freedom Forum's affiliate organizations include the Al Neuharth Media Center at the University of South Dakota; the Overby Center for Southern Journalism and Politics at the University of Mississippi; and the John Seigenthaler Center at Vanderbilt University.

== History and current work ==
Independence Day marks the birth of the Freedom Forum, which grew out of the Frank E. Gannett Newspaper Foundation, established by the newspaper publisher in Rochester, N.Y., in 1935. The foundation supported journalism education, adult-literacy campaigns and social-service causes, particularly those within the mostly small towns served by Gannett's many newspapers and broadcast stations. After Al Neuharth became Gannett's chief executive officer in 1973, the company became the nation's largest newspaper chain. The foundation also grew. From 1977 through 1989, it provided nearly $27 million in grants — to further journalism-related education, nonprofits, professional organizations, diversity and other initiatives.

In 1989, the foundation relocated to Arlington, Va., overlooking Washington, D.C. In 1991, after selling its Gannett stock back to the company, it severed all ties to the company and renamed itself the Freedom Forum. Over the next decade, the organization undertook several initiatives to honor journalists and advance free press, including a television segment and a media studies center.

On April 18, 1997, the Freedom Forum opened the Newseum in Arlington, Va., to help the improve understanding of the media through news-related artifacts, interactive exhibits, theaters, engaging programs and an education center. After welcoming 2.25 million visitors over five years, the Arlington Newseum closed in March 2002, to plan for its new location in Washington, D.C. From 2000-2019 the Freedom Forum continued its mission by establishing its flagship programs.

In 2011, the organization launched the Digital Classroom website with support from the Ford Foundation. This marked the first step in making Newseum content available to educators online, with lesson plans and videos based on Newseum collections. Later revamped as NewseumED, the Freedom Forum's ongoing digital education offerings have reached more than 11 million students, educators, and lifelong learners around the globe.

In 2016, the Freedom Forum launched its annual Free Expression Awards to honor dedication to the freedoms of the First Amendment. Honorees have included journalists, activists, athletes, politicians, attorneys, clerics, media executives and others who have made a difference by exercising their First Amendment rights.

In 2018, in response to sex abuse scandals involving major media figures, the Freedom Forum's Newseum convened the Power Shift Summit, seeking solutions-based alternatives for employees facing abuse and emphasizing the need for diversity and inclusiveness in America's newsrooms. The summit launched the Power Shift Project, with grant funding from CBS to implement its Workplace Integrity Training program, designed to produce workplaces free of harassment, discrimination and incivility, and filled with opportunity, especially for those who have traditionally been denied it. The program continued until 2024.

In 2020, the Freedom Forum and the Library of Congress announced more than 250 boxes of papers Freedom Forum founder Al Neuharth donated to the library in 2005, available to researchers . The papers chronicle his life and career.

== Divisions and impact ==
The Freedom Forum calls itself the nation's foremost advocate for First Amendment freedoms. Each year, it engages thousands of Americans on the freedoms of religion, speech, press, assembly and petition through debates with engaging expert content, conversations, and digital storytelling. It surveys Americans annually about their First Amendment rights and organizes events and other content to showcase "champions of free expression."

Today's Front Pages is a daily curation of front pages from newspapers across any town in America. Hosted through an online application, editors upload their papers' cover pages. The program is one of the most popular collections the organization hosts.

Where America Stands is an annual survey report which synthesizes responses from around 800 respondents, though the number of respondents varies slightly by year. Its purpose is to present statistical data showing how Americans view the current state of freedoms of religion, speech, press, assembly and petition guaranteed by the First Amendment.

The Al Neuharth Free Spirit and Journalism Conference is an annual opportunity for high school juniors to receive a $1,000 college scholarship. The program was established in 1999 to honor the founder of The Freedom Forum and USA TODAY. The conference is designed to inspire and encourage students to pursue journalism careers and become people who "dream, dare, do." Free Spirit alumni include journalists working for The New York Times, The Washington Post, The Baltimore Sun, ESPN and network-affiliated TV stations.

The Freedom Forum has produced a variety of educational content distributed on YouTube including the First Five Express, First Five Now, First Five Live, and First Amendment Fast Facts.

The annual Free Expression Awards have run since 2016, "honoring champions of free expression for exercising their rights to express themselves, spark conversations and inspire action." Guest speakers and award recipients have included Tim Cook, Ava DuVernay, John Lewis, General Colin Powell, Pussy Riot, Eric Treene, and Judy Woodruff.

The organization's 1A Fest is an annual gathering aimed at exploring First Amendment conversations, games, and classroom sessions.

The Freedom Forum's Newseum Collection hosts a curation of Ted Polumbaum photos made available for licensing. Photographs in this online exhibit examine three specific areas: the early political career of Sen. Edward Kennedy from 1958 to 1969; the events of Freedom Summer in 1964; and his coverage of historic moments and extraordinary people.

== Notable experts ==
Freedom Forum has a team of First Amendment educators and lawyers to provide expert commentary and editorials.

== Funding ==
The Freedom Forum is supported in part by contributions and grants.

== See also ==
- Religious Freedom Restoration Act
- First Amendment to the United States Constitution
- List of United States Supreme Court cases involving the First Amendment

== General References ==
- Freedom Forum Records, 1959-1978. M.E. Grenander Department of Special Collections and Archives, University Libraries, University at Albany, State University of New York (hereafter referred to as the Freedom Forum Records).
