= 46th News and Documentary Emmy Awards =

- Date: June 25, 2025 (News Categories); June 26, 2025 (Documentary Categories)
- Location: Palladium Times Square, New York City
- Most awards: Trafficked: Underworlds with Mariana van Zeller (4)
- Most nominations: Trafficked: Underworlds with Mariana van Zeller (29)

Television/radio coverage
- Network: Watch.TheEmmys.TV

The 46th News and Documentary Emmy Awards, presented by the National Academy of Television Arts and Sciences, honored the best in American news and documentary programming in 2024. The award ceremonies took place on June 25 and 26, 2025, at Palladium Times Square in New York City. The winners of the news categories were revealed on the first night, and the winners of the documentary categories were announced on the second night. The ceremonies were live-streamed at Watch.TheEmmys.TV and the Emmys app.

In January 2025, NATAS president Adam Sharp revealed that the News and Documentary Emmys would change its scheduling from late September to June, saying that moving the ceremony earlier "shines a brighter light on the timely nature of the incredible content being recognized".

The nominees were announced on May 1, 2025. National Geographic's investigative series Trafficked: Underworlds with Mariana van Zeller led the nominations with 29. American weather presenter Al Roker and American documentary filmmaker Jon H. Else received the Lifetime Achievement Awards, for their work in news and documentaries respectively.

== Winners and nominees ==
The nominees were announced on May 1, 2025. The winners were revealed on June 25 and 26, 2025.

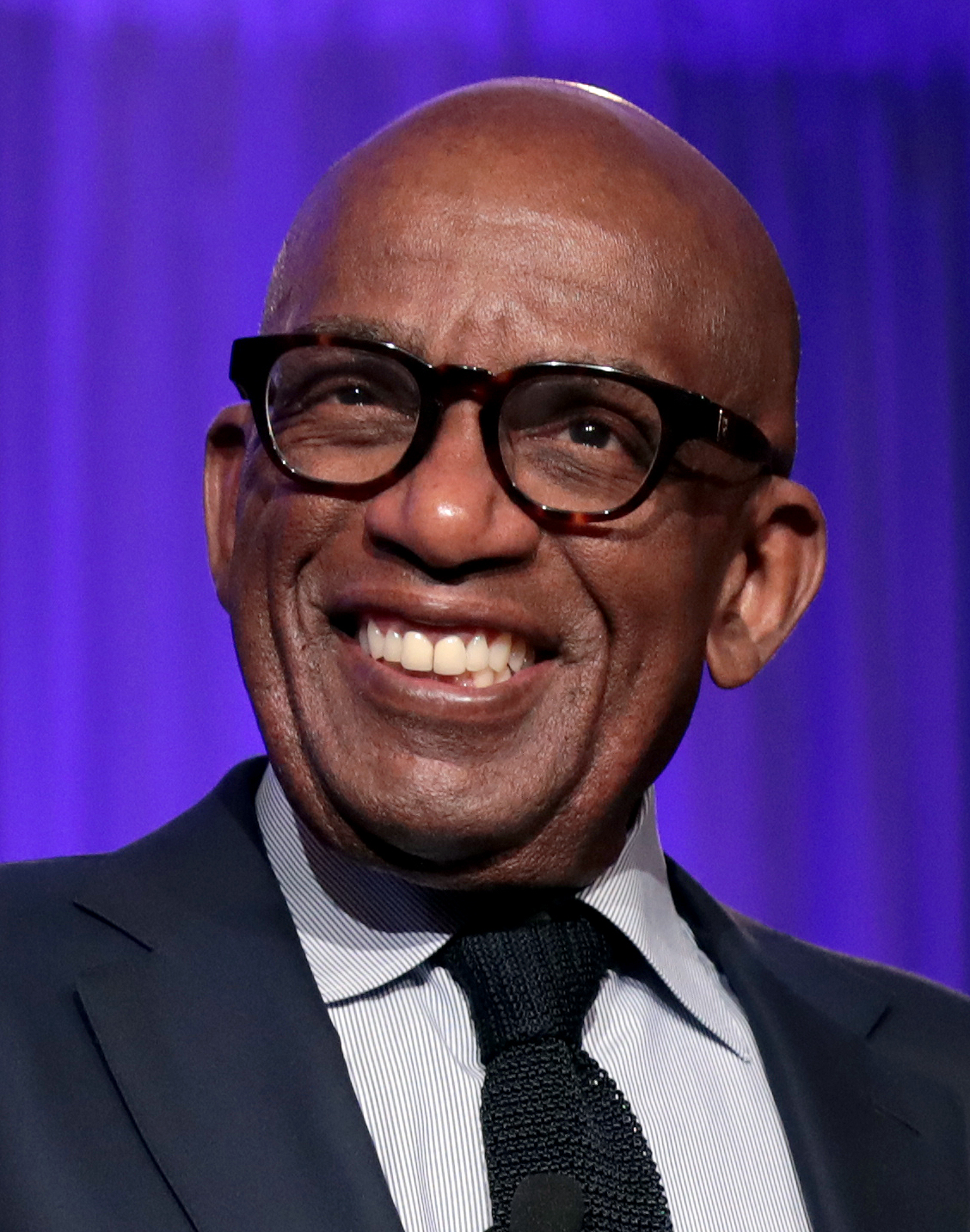
Al Roker, Lifetime Achievement Award recipient

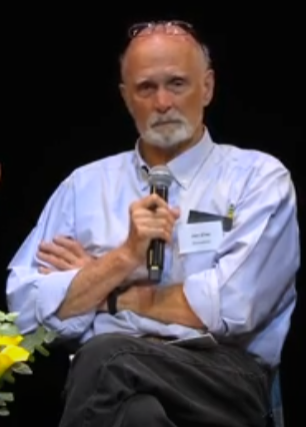
Jon H. Else, Lifetime Achievement Award recipient

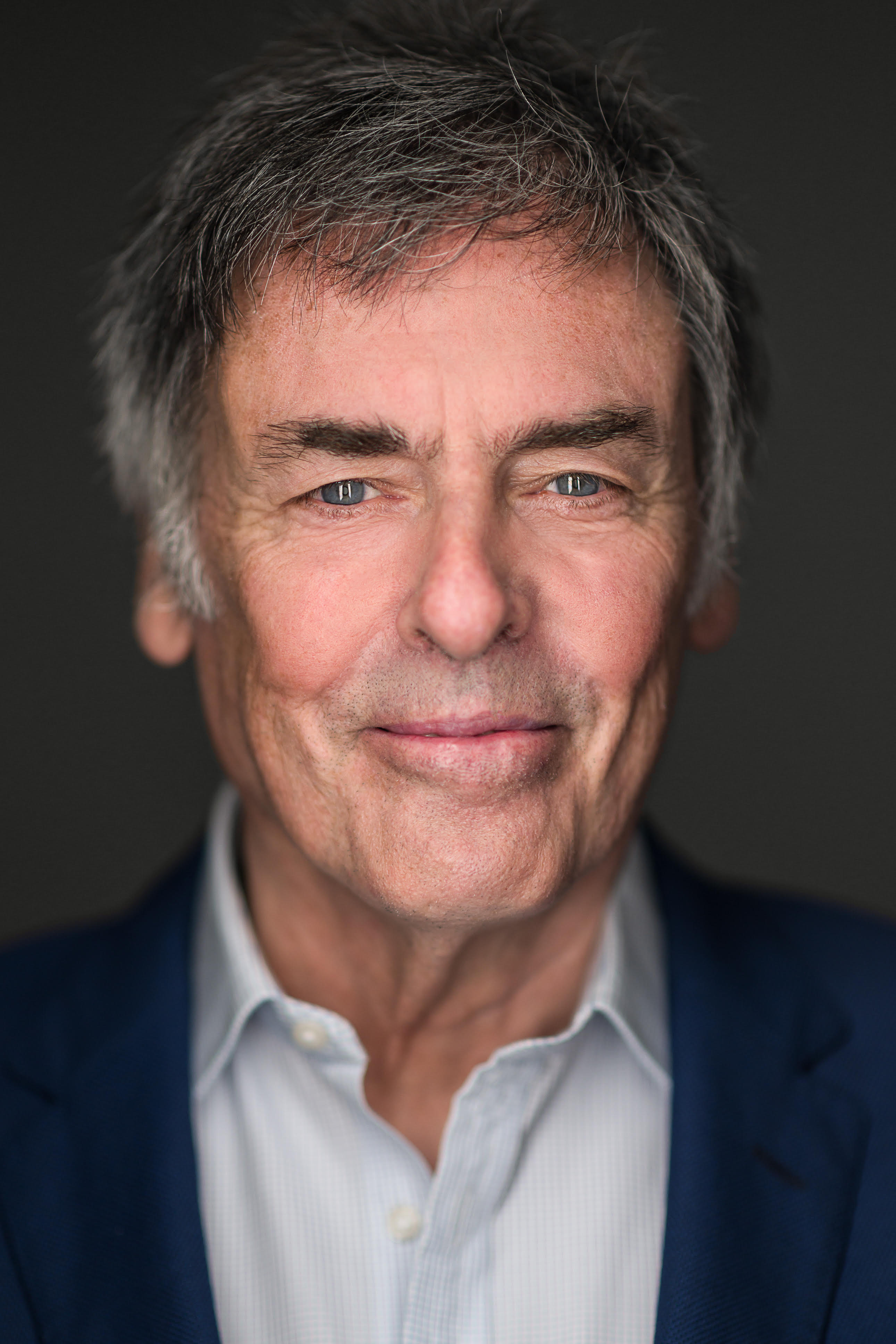
Michael Kirk, Golden Circle Inductee

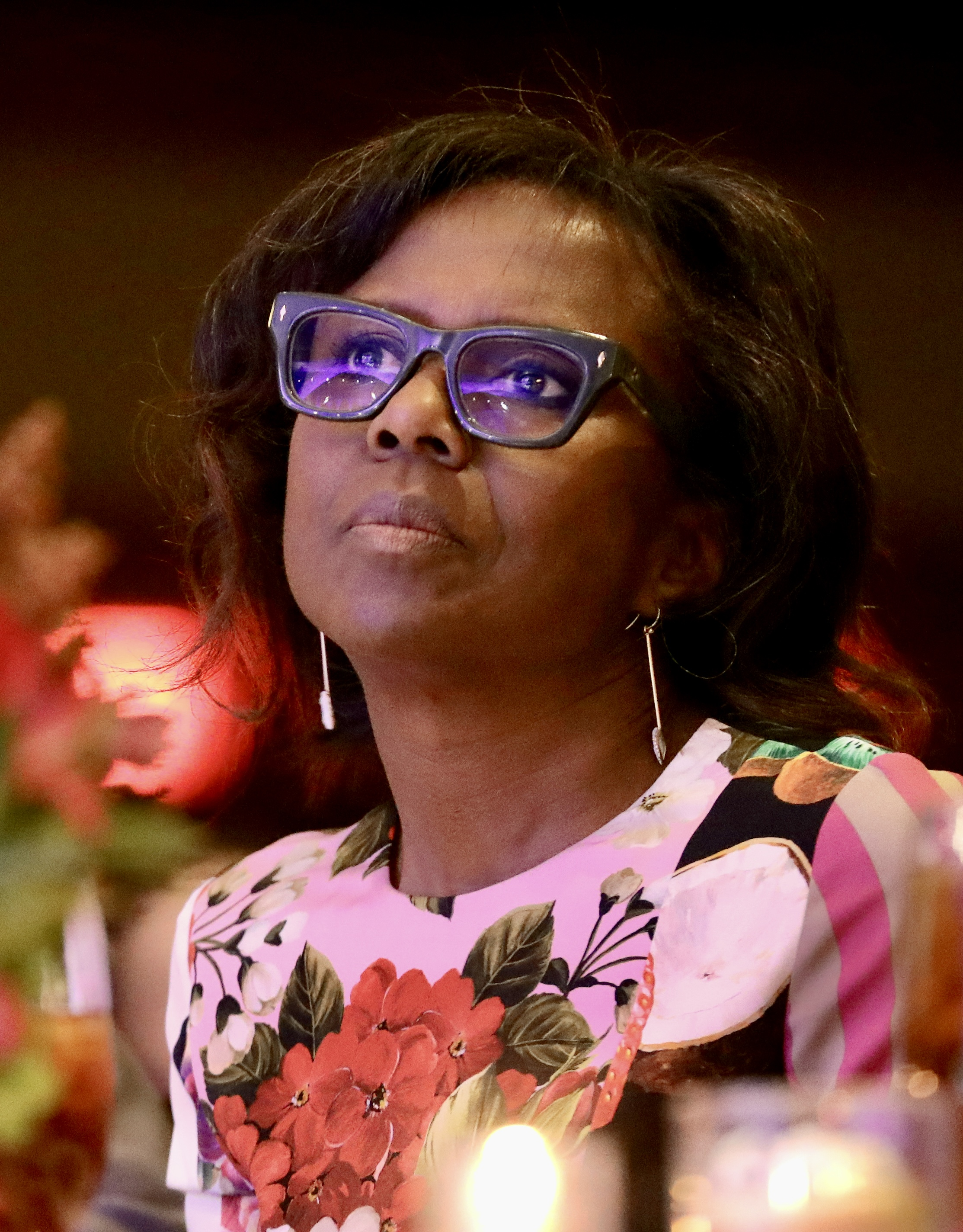
Deborah Roberts, Silver Circle Inductee

=== Lifetime Achievement Award ===
- Al Roker (Weather presenter, journalist, television personality, and author – news)
- Jon H. Else (Documentary filmmaker and professor at UC Berkeley Graduate School of Journalism – documentary)

=== Gold Circle Inductees ===
- Marc Burstein – Senior Executive Producer & Mentor, ABC News (news)
- Martha Teichner – Correspondent & Journalist, CBS Sunday Morning (news)
- Michael Kirk – Filmmaker, Frontline and Kirk Documentary Group (documentary)
- Gordon Quinn – Filmmaker, Kartemquin Films (documentary)
- Marcia Smith – Filmmaker, Firelight Media (documentary)

=== Silver Circle Inductees ===
- Akram Abi-Hanna – Veteran Cameraman & Photojournalist, ABC News (news)
- Cater Lee – Executive Management, Spectrum News and E.W. Scripps (news)
- Bill Owens – Executive Producer, 60 Minutes (news)
- Deborah Roberts – Journalist & Co-Anchor, 20/20 (news)
- Gemma Cubero del Barrio – Producer, Director & Writer, PBS (documentary)
- Aljernon Tunsil – Editor, PBS and Firelight Films (documentary)

=== News Programming ===
Outstanding Live News Program	Outstanding Recorded News Program
ABC World News Tonight with David Muir (ABC); CBS Evening News with Norah O'Donnell (CBS); CBS Mornings (CBS); Good Morning America (ABC); Top Story with Tom Llamas (NBC News Now); NBC Nightly News with Lester Holt (NBC)	The Whole Story with Anderson Cooper (CNN Worldwide); CBS News Sunday Morning (CBS); Dateline NBC (NBC News); In Real Life (Evident, Scripps News); Trafficked: Underworlds with Mariana van Zeller (National Geographic)
Outstanding Breaking News Coverage	Outstanding Emerging Journalist
Tracking Helene: "Hurricane Helene Landfall" (The Weather Channel); "Hurricane Milton" (CNN Worldwide); ABC World News Tonight with David Muir: "Hurricane Milton State of Emergency" (ABC); "On the Brink" (PBS News Hour); "South Korea Declares Martial Law" (CNN Worldwide); "The Trump Assassination Attempt" (The New York Times)	Natasha Zouves (NewsNation); Gerardo del Valle (ProPublica / The Texas Tribune / Univision); Skyler Henry (CBS); Jay O'Brien (ABC News); Katie Polglase (CNN Worldwide)
Outstanding Continuing News Coverage: Short Form	Outstanding Continuing News Coverage: Long Form
"Myanmar's Civil War" (BBC News) (Jonathan Head, Yogita Limaye, and Quentin Sommerville, correspondents); "Clarissa Ward: The Fall of Damascus" (CNN Worldwide) (David Culver, correspondent); "Gang-Fueled Unrest in Haiti" (CNN Worldwide); "Inside Syria: Assad Overthrown" (ABC News) (James Longman, correspondent); "Nick Paton Walsh Covers the War in Ukraine" (CNN Worldwide)	60 Minutes: "Border Coverage" (CBS News) (Sharyn Alfonsi and Cecilia Vega, correspondents); Nightline: "Abortion in America: Fallout from the Dobbs Decision" (ABC) (Rachel Scott and Selina Wang, correspondents); "Donie O'Sullivan: MisinfoNation Trilogy" (CNN Worldwide); "Sudan's Civil War" (PBS News Hour) (Leila Molana-Allen, correspondent); 60 Minutes: "A Week in Israel & The Pager Plot" (CBS News) (Lesley Stahl, correspondent)
Outstanding Light Feature Story: Short Form	Outstanding Light Feature Story: Long Form
CBS Sunday Morning: "Face to Face" (CBS) (Seth Doane, correspondent); ABC News Nightline and ABC News Prime: "African Migration: The Deadly Atlantic Route" (ABC) (Ian Pannell, correspondent); CBS Sunday Morning: "Empty Rooms" (CBS) (Steve Hartman, correspondent); "How Tyson Captured All The Pork You Eat (And Made Billions)" (More Perfect Union) (Chai Dingari, director); ABC World News Tonight with David Muir: "Return to Normandy" (ABC) (David Muir, anchor)	"The Man Who Feeds Gaza's Children" (Business Insider) (Reem Makhoul, producer); 60 Minutes: "Bhutan" (CBS News) (Lesley Stahl, correspondent); 60 Minutes: "The Cap Arcona" (CBS News) (Bill Whitaker, correspondent); ABC News Live and Global Conservation: "Last Lands: Central Africa" (ABC) (Bob Woodruff, correspondent); In the Shadows with Jason Bellini: "The Moses Videos" (Scripps News) (Jason Bellini, correspondent); The Whole Story with Anderson Cooper: "The Playing Field" (CNN Worldwide) (Adrienne Magun and Alice Yu, producers)
Outstanding Hard News Feature Story: Short Form	Outstanding Hard News Feature Story: Long Form
"She Survived an Airstrike that Killed Her Entire Family in Gaza" (The New York Times) (Mona El-Naggar, reporter); BBC World News America: "Haiti: Inside the City Ruled by Over 100 Gangs" (BBC News) (Nawal Al-Maghafi, correspondent); "How Indiscriminate Israeli Fire Killed Half a Family in Gaza" (CNN Worldwide) (Jomana Karadsheh, correspondent); "A Mother's Tragic Tale from War-Torn Gaza" (CNN Worldwide) (Jeremy Diamond, correspondent); Matter of Fact with Soledad O'Brien: "Nowhere to Call Home: The Working Homeless" (Hearst Television) (Jessica Gomez, correspondent); "Sde Teiman: Israeli Whistleblowers Detail Abuse" (CNN Worldwide) (Matthew Chance, correspondent); "The Walking Route" (CNN Worldwide) (David Culver, correspondent)	Fault Lines: "Children of the Darien Gap" (Al Jazeera International USA) (John Holman, correspondent); Fault Lines: "All That Remains" (Al Jazeera International USA) (Rhana Natour, director); Trafficked: Underworlds with Mariana van Zeller: "Caught in a Coup" (National Geographic) (Robert Muraskin, director); In Real Life: "A Hidden War" (Evident, Scripps News) (Sebastian Walker, correspondent); "On the Front Lines of Sudan's Forgotten War" (The Wall Street Journal) (Ben C. Solomon, correspondent)
Outstanding Investigative News Coverage: Short Form	Outstanding Investigative News Coverage: Long Form
"Europe's Migration Crisis" (BBC News) (Andrew Harding, Yogita Limaye, and Jess Parker, correspondents); NBC Nightly News with Lester Holt: "Dealing the Dead" (NBC News) (Liz Kreutz, correspondent); "Grandmother Shot and Killed Fleeing Gaza" (CNN Worldwide) (Clarissa Ward, correspondent); "Hospitals in Peril, The Looting of Steward Health Care" (CBS News) (Jonathan LaPook, correspondent); Scripps News Investigates: "Maine Shooting: Missed Warnings" (Scripps News) (Lori Jane Gliha, correspondent)	60 Minutes: "Targeting Americans" (CBS) (Scott Pelley, correspondent); "Baby Heaven: The Buried Stories of Camp Lejeune" (NBC News NOW) (Cynthia McFadden, correspondent); Frontline: "Documenting Police Use of Force" (PBS) (Martha Bellisle, Ryan J. Foley, Kristin M. Hall, Aaron Morrison, and Mitch Weiss, correspondents); Trafficked: Underworlds with Mariana van Zeller: "The Drug Mule Scam" (National Geographic); "How 'Trophy' Videos Link Paramilitary Commanders to War Crimes in Sudan" (The New York Times) (Aaron Byrd, Christoph Koettl, Sanjana Varghese, and Declan Walsh, producers); Scripps News Investigates: "Missed Warnings" (Scripps News) (Lori Jane Gliha, correspondent)
Outstanding Live News Special	Outstanding Recorded News Special
"2024 Total Solar Eclipse: Through the Eyes of NASA" (NASA+) (Tahira Allen, Megan Cruz, Gina DiBraccio, and Sarah Noble, anchors); "CNN Presidential Town Hall with Vice President Kamala Harris" (CNN Worldwide) (Anderson Cooper, anchor); "Decision 2024: Election Night" (NBC News) (Savannah Guthrie, Lester Holt, Hallie Jackson, Tom Llamas, Craig Melvin, Kate Snow, and Kristen Welker, anchors); "Special Report: Assassination Attempt" (NBC News) (Hallie Jackson and Tom Llamas, anchors); "Total Eclipse of the Heartland" (CBS) (Tony Dokoupil, William Harwood, Kristine Johnson, Norah O'Donnell, Marie Saavedra, anchors); "Your Voice Your Vote: The 2024 Election" (ABC News) (Linsey Davis and David Muir, anchors)	20/20: "Jimmy Carter: A Full Life" (ABC) (Steve Osunsami, Byron Pitts, and Deborah Roberts, correspondents); ABC News Live: "Exodus: Global Migration" (ABC) (Britt Clennett, Ian Pannell, Matt Rivers, and Mireya Villarreal, correspondents); NewsNation Prime: "Growing Broke: Forever Chemicals in America's Heartland" (NewsNation) (Ryan Kerr and Natasha Zouves, producers); The Whole Story with Anderson Cooper: "Hostages: The Road Home" (CNN Worldwide) (Bianna Golodryga, correspondent); VICE Special Report: "Surviving Nova" (VICE News) (Gilad Thaler, director)
Outstanding News Discussion & Analysis	Outstanding News Discussion & Analysis: Editorial and Opinion
"America First: A Fareed Zakaria Special" (CNN Worldwide); "Elliott County Voted for Democrats For 144 Years. Then Came Trump..." (More Perfect Union) (Josh Hirschfield-Kroen and John Russell, producers; "American Autocracy: It Could Happen Here" (MSNBC) (Vaughn Hillyard, correspondent); In Real Life: "Independent America" (Evident, Scripps News) (Gianna Toboni, correspondent); Face the Nation: "Israel-Hamas War" (CBS) (Mark Strassmann and Imtiaz Tyab, correspondents)	The New York Times Opinion: "Two Weeks Inside Gaza's Ruined Hospitals" (The New York Times) (Alexander Stockton and Amanda Su, producers); "Deadlock: An Election Story" (PBS) (Mark Mannucci, director); The New York Times Opinion: "Grab Your Calculators. We’re Going to Jail." (The New York Times) (Jonah Kessel and Kirk Semple, producers); The New York Times Opinion: "How Tennessee Keeps Nearly Half a Million People From Voting" (The New York Times) (Emily Holzknecht, producer); The New York Times Opinion: "I Put Him on Death Row. He Shouldn't Die." (The New York Times) (Kirk Semple and Adam Westbrook, producers)
Outstanding Live Interview: Short Form	Outstanding Live Interview: Long Form
Amanpour: "Interview with Jake Larson" (CNN Worldwide) (Christiane Amanpour, anchor); "Breaking News: The Assassination Attempt of Donald Trump" (BBC News) (Gary O'Donoghue, correspondent); Newsroom with Pamela Brown: "Interview with Oklahoma School Superintendent Ryan Walters" (CNN Worldwide) (Pamela Brown, anchor); NewsNight with Abby Phillip: "Interview with the Parents of Breonna Moffett" (CNN Worldwide) (Abby Phillip, anchor); Anderson Cooper 360°: "Interview with Vice President Kamala Harris" (CNN Worldwide) (Anderson Cooper, anchor)	NBC News Specials and NBC Nightly News: "President Biden Exclusive" (NBC News) (Lester Holt, anchor); State of the Union with Jake Tapper and Dana Bash: "Interview with JD Vance" (CNN Worldwide) (Dana Bash, anchor); Anderson Cooper 360°: "Interview with the Parents of Hersh Goldberg-Polin" (CNN Worldwide) (Anderson Cooper, anchor); The Beat with Ari Melber: "Interview with Trump Advisor Stephen Miller" (MSNBC) (Ari Melber, anchor); Good Morning America and This Week with George Stephanopoulos: "One on One with President Biden" (ABC News) (George Stephanopoulos, anchor)
Outstanding Edited Interview	Outstanding Science and Technology Coverage
60 Minutes: "Pope Francis" (CBS News) (Norah O'Donnell, correspondent); NBC News: "Celine's Story: An NBC News Special with Hoda Kotb" (NBC News / Dateline) (Hoda Kotb, correspondent); 60 Minutes: "The Democratic Ticket" (CBS News) (Bill Whitaker, correspondent); CBS Sunday Morning: "Ketanji Brown Jackson" (CBS) (Norah O'Donnell, correspondent); 20/20: "Prisoner in Russia: The Brittney Griner Interview" (ABC) (Robin Roberts, anchor	The Future with Hannah Fry: "Quantum Arms Race" (Bloomberg); In Real Life: "Darwin's War" (Scripps News) (Jason Bellini, correspondent); Hope in the Water: "Farming the Water" (PBS) (Martha Stewart, correspondent); 60 Minutes: "The Promise" (CBS News) (Scott Pelley, correspondent); Trafficked: Underworlds with Mariana van Zeller: "Sextortion" (National Geographic)
Outstanding Climate, Environment and Weather Coverage	Outstanding Health or Medical Coverage
Frontline: "Maui's Deadly Firestorm" (PBS) (Xinyan Yu, director); Trafficked: Underworlds with Mariana van Zeller: "Apes" (National Geographic); ABC News Live in Partnership with Global Conservation: "Last Lands: Indonesia and Ecuador" (ABC) (Bob Woodruff, correspondent); 60 Minutes: "Relief, NC" (CBS News) (Sharyn Alfonsi, correspondent); PBS News Hour: "Toxic Trifecta" (PBS) (Fred de Sam Lazaro, correspondent); The Whole Story with Anderson Cooper: "Warning to the World: Australia's Climate Disaster" (CNN Worldwide) (Ivan Watson, correspondent)	Trafficked: Underworlds with Mariana van Zeller: "Body Parts" (National Geographic); Trafficked: Underworlds with Mariana van Zeller: "Black Market Meds" (National Geographic); The New York Times Presents: "Lie to Fly" (FX on Hulu) (Carmen García Durazo, director); 60 Minutes: "Master of the Mind" (CBS News) (Sharyn Alfonsi, correspondent); Fault Lines: "Starving Gaza" (Al Jazeera International USA) (Hind Hassan, correspondent); Paola Ramos and Alex Wagner Tonight: "Twice Harmed: Asylum Seekers Face Sexual Violence & Abortion Bans" (MSNBC) (Paola Ramos, correspondent); The New York Times Opinion: "What's My Life Worth?" (The New York Times) (Alexander Stockton, producer)
Outstanding Arts, Culture or Entertainment Coverage	Outstanding Business, Consumer or Economic Coverage
Trafficked: Underworlds with Mariana van Zeller: "Illegal Gambling" (National Geographic); ABC News Live: "10 Million Names" (ABC) (Linsey Davis, Alex Presha, and Pierre Thomas, correspondents); ABC News Studios: "Bruce Springsteen: Backstage and Backstreets" (ABC); CBS Sunday Morning: "Finding His Voice" (CBS) (Lee Cowan, correspondent); ABC World News Tonight with David Muir and Nightline: "The Last Heroes of Normandy" (ABC) (David Muir, anchor); The Circuit with Emily Chang: "Netflix is Betting Big on Latin America" (Bloomberg)	True Cost: "The True Cost of Mining Electric Car Battery Metals" (Business Insider) (Elizabeth McCauley, producer); Trafficked: Underworlds with Mariana van Zeller: "Migrant Smugglers" (National Geographic); CBS Reports: "Raising the Stakes: America's Growing Sports Gambling Addiction" (CBS) (Adam Yamaguchi, correspondent); ABC News Live: "Trashed: The Secret World of Plastic Exports" (ABC) (Matt Gutman, correspondent); 60 Minutes: "The Trustbuster" (CBS News) (Lesley Stahl, correspondent)
Outstanding Crime and Justice Coverage
Trafficked: Underworlds with Mariana van Zeller: "Hash Smugglers" (National Geographic); Trafficked: Underworlds with Mariana van Zeller: "Assassins" (National Geographic); Frontline: "Breakdown in Maine" (PBS) (Bronwyn Berry, director); "How Russian Hackers Stole Millions from U.S. Investors — Putin's Trader" (CNBC) (Eamon Javers, correspondent); ABC News Studios: "Sins of the Parents: The Crumbley Trials" (Hulu) (Margie Merritt, Katie Muldowney, Misha Rezvi, and Myles Sorensen, producers)

=== Spanish Language Programming ===
Outstanding News Program in Spanish	Outstanding Journalist in Spanish Language Media
Noticiero Univision (Univision); Conclusiones (CNN Worldwide); Noticias Telemundo con Julio Vaqueiro (Telemundo); Noticiero Univision Edicion Digital (Univision)	Julio Vaqueiro (Telemundo); Damià Bonmatí (Telemundo); Albert Martínez (The Weather Channel en Español); Pau Mosquera (CNN Worldwide)
Outstanding Coverage of a Breaking News Story in Spanish	Outstanding Investigative News Coverage in Spanish
Noticias Telemundo: "Harris o Trump: Batalla Final Decision 2024" (Telemundo); Noticiero Univision: "Atentado Contra Donald Trump" (Univision); Noticias Telemundo: "Eclipse Total" (Telemundo)	"NarcoFiles: Tren de Aragua" (CNN Worldwide); "Cada Vez Más Migrantes Viajan Encerrados en Tráileres por México Rumbo a EE.UU." (Telemundo); N+ Focus: "China Inc: Un Negocio Criminal de Aduanas" (Vix / TelevisaUnivision); N+ Focus: "Deportación Infantil: El Muro Mexicano" (Vix / TelevisaUnivision); Noticiero Univision: "El Darién, Cementerio Sin Cruces" (Univision); El Último Refugio de la Vaquita Marina: "La Lucha por Salvar las Últimas 8 Vaquitas Marinas del Mundo" (VICE News)
Outstanding Feature Story in Spanish
"Nacer Sin Extremidades: la Vida de Carlos Candelario Tras la Exposición a Pesticidas de su Madre" (Univision); "El Camino Correcto: el Largo Viaje Para Pedir Asilo de Una Familia Venezolana" (ProPublica / The Texas Tribune / Univision); "Más y Más y Más Flores" (The New York Times Op-Docs); "Nuestro Planeta: Voces del Cambio Climático" (Telemundo Station Group); "To Live in a Wild Sea" (The New York Times Op-Docs)

=== Documentary Programming ===
Best Documentary	Outstanding Arts and Culture Documentary
The Sing Sing Chronicles (MSNBC); American Conspiracy: The Octopus Murders (Netflix); The Commandant's Shadow (HBO / Max); The Grab (Center for Investigative Reporting Studios); Hollywood Black (MGM+) (Justin Simien, director); Mammals (BBC America / AMC+) (Lydia Baines, Will Lawson, and Daniel Rasmussen, directors); Queendom (Galdanova Film); The Sixth (Amazon / Apple TV+); The Truth vs. Alex Jones (HBO / Max)	Madu (Disney+); As We Speak: Rap Music on Trial (Paramount+) (Sam Bisbee, Peter Cambor, J.M. Harper, and Sam Widdoes, producers); Butterfly in the Sky (Fifth Season); Hollywood Black (MGM+) (Justin Simien, director); POV: "King Coal" (PBS)
Outstanding Current Affairs Documentary	Outstanding Social Issue Documentary
We Will Dance Again (Paramount+); 64 Days: The Insurrection Playbook (Goldcrest Films) (Nick Quested, director); Bread & Roses (Apple TV+); ABC News Live: "Print It Black" (ABC) (John Quiñones and Maria Elena Salinas, correspondents); Frontline: "A Year of War: Israelis and Palestinians" (PBS) (Robin Barnwell, director)	Frontline: "Two American Families: 1991-2024" (PBS) (Tom Casciato and Kathleen Hughes, directors; Bill Moyers, correspondent); Daughters (Netflix); Death Without Mercy (Showtime) (Waad Al-Kateab, director); POV: "Name Me Lawand" (PBS) (Edward Lovelace, director); Independent Lens: "One With the Whale" (PBS) (Peter Chelkowski and Jim Wickens, directors)
Outstanding Politics and Government Documentary	Outstanding Business and Economic Documentary
The Sixth (A24); Battleground Texas (VICE News) (Simone Perez and Gianna Toboni, producers); POV: "The Body Politic" (PBS) (Gabriel Francis Paz Goodenough, director); Carville: Winning is Everything, Stupid (CNN Worldwide) (Brett Kelly, director); From Russia With Lev (MSNBC); American Experience: "The Riot Report" (PBS) (Michelle Ferrari and Connie Honeycutt, producers); POV: "Who's Afraid of Nathan Law?" (PBS) (Joe Piscatella, director)	Buy Now! The Shopping Conspiracy (Netflix); Bitconned (Netflix); Diane von Furstenberg: Woman in Charge (Hulu) (Trish Dalton and Sharmeen Obaid-Chinoy, directors); The Hobby (Documentary+) (Morgan Jon Fox, director); MoviePass, MovieCrash (HBO / Max); Independent Lens: "Razing Liberty Square" (PBS) (Katja Esson, director)
Outstanding Investigative Documentary	Outstanding Historical Documentary
American Conspiracy: The Octopus Murders (Netflix); Frontline: "A Dangerous Assignment: Uncovering Corruption in Maduro's Venezuela" (PBS) (Juan Andrés Ravell, director); The Grab (Center for Investigative Reporting Studios); Fault Lines: "The Night Won't End" (Al Jazeera International USA) (Kavitha Chekuru, director); Frontline: "South Korea's Adoption Reckoning" (PBS) (Lora Moftah, director)	Tsunami: Race Against Time (National Geographic) (Daniel Bogado, director); An American Bombing: The Road to April 19th (HBO / Max) (Marc Levin, director); American Experience: "Fly with Me" (PBS) (Sarah Colt, director); Turning Point: The Bomb and the Cold War (Netflix)
Outstanding Science and Technology Documentary	Outstanding Nature Documentary
Nova: "Hunt for the Oldest DNA" (PBS) (Niobe Thompson, director); Photographer: "Anand Varma: Hidden Wonders" (National Geographic) (Marshall Curry, director); Apollo 13: Survival (Netflix) (Peter Middleton, director); The Space Race (National Geographic) (Lisa Cortés and Diego Hurtado de Mendoza, directors); What's Next? The Future with Bill Gates (Netflix)	Photographer: "Paul Nicklen & Cristina Mittermeier: Win or Die" (National Geographic) (Elizabeth Chai Vasarhelyi and Jimmy Chin, directors); Nature: "Patrick and the Whale" (PBS) (Mark Fletcher, director); Nature: "Attenborough and the Jurassic Sea Monster" (PBS) (Victoria Bobin, director); Billy & Molly: An Otter Love Story (National Geographic); Nature: "Grizzly 399: Queen of the Tetons" (PBS) (Elizabeth Leiter, producer); Our Living World (Netflix) (Laura Coates, Kirstine Davidson, Peter Lown, and James Shelton, directors); Nature: "Silverback" (PBS) (Miles Blayden-Ryall, director)
Outstanding Crime and Justice Documentary	Outstanding Short Documentary
The Truth vs. Alex Jones (HBO / Max); Cult Massacre: One Day In Jonestown (National Geographic) (Marian Mohamed, director); Into the Fire: The Lost Daughter (Netflix); Mastermind: To Think Like a Killer (Hulu); American Experience: "Poisoned Ground: The Tragedy at Love Canal" (PBS) (Jamila Ephron, director)	Bloomberg Investigates: "The Dirty Business of Monkey Laundering" (Bloomberg) (Adrianne Jeffries, producer); Love To The Max (The New Yorker) (Tanya Selvaratnam, director); Motorcycle Mary (ESPN) (Haley Watson, director); Swept (Human Rights Watch) (Adam Silver, director); Wings of Dust (Documentary+) (Giorgio Ghiotto, director)

=== Craft ===
Outstanding Video Journalism: News	Outstanding Cinematography: Documentary
In Real Life: "A Hidden War" – Shrouq Aila, Javier Manzano, Adam Desiderio (Evident, Scripps News); Trafficked: Underworlds with Mariana van Zeller: "Caught in a Coup" – Frederic Menou, Daniel Hollis (National Geographic); Trafficked: Underworlds with Mariana van Zeller: "Hash Smugglers" – Frederic Menou, Joshua Flannigan (National Geographic); Trafficked: Underworlds with Mariana van Zeller: "Migrant Smugglers" – Frederic Menou, Joshua Flannigan (National Geographic); "On the Front Lines With Ukraine's Killer Drone Pilot" – Ben C. Solomon (The Wall Street Journal)	Secret World of Sound with David Attenborough – Camera Team (Note: Kevin Flay, Hugo Kitching, James Aldred, Luke Barnett, Ralph Bower, Duncan Brake, Tavish Campbell, Rod Clarke, Ben Cunningham, Filipe Deandrade, Adam Horder, Deirdre Leowinata, Katie Mayhew, Sam Meyrick, Roger Munns, Duncan Parker, Robin Smith, Romilly Spiers, Gavin Thurston, Darren West, Mark Yates) (Netflix); Earthsounds – Rod Clarke, Dawson Dunning, Dan Hunter, Louis Labrom, Mark Payne-Gill, David Reichert, Ed Saltau, Romilly Spiers (Apple TV+); POV: "King Coal" – Curren Sheldon (PBS); Nature: "Lions of the Skeleton Coast" – Lianne Steenkamp, Will Steenkamp (PBS); Mammals – Neil Anderson, Howard Bourne, Jo Charlesworth, Olly Jelley, Xuan Hui Ke, Florian Ledoux, Kieran O'Donovan, Jacky Poon, Oliver Richards, John Shier, Max Smith, Bertie Gregory, Jamie McPherson, Hugh Miller, Vincent Munier, Florian Schulz, Phil Timpany (BBC America / AMC+); Our Living World – Camera Team (Note: Knut Aas, Ben Adams, James Aldred, Felix Baker, Guillaume Beaudoin, Owen Bissell, Julian Braatvedt, Bernt Bruns, Juan Pablo Bueno Gomez, Sashwa Burrous, Santiago Cabral, Mauricio Copetti, Nate Dappen, Tania Escobar, James Ewen, Richard Fitzpatrick, Steve Hathaway, Corby Hines, Matt Hobbs, Jeff Hogan, Tom Hooker, David Hutchinson, Todd Kewley, Georgia Krause, Brett Kuxhausen, Joseph Large, Justin Lewis, Simon Lewis, Neil Losin, Michael Male, Andrew Manske, Michael Mauro, Kyle McBurnie, Zachary Moxley, Jordan Myers, Greg Nelson, Nick Pitt, Corey Robinson, Santiago Espindola Rodriguez, Dariosky Gonzalez Romero, Christiaan Muñoz Salas, Florian Schulz, Mark Sharman, Tim Shepherd, Alexander Sommer, Julian Tryba, Taylor Turner, Alex Vail, Noah Waldron, Darren West, Dom West, Alex Wiles, Shaun Wolfe, George Woodcock, David Wright, Mark Ó Fearghaíl) (Netflix)
Outstanding Direction: News	Outstanding Direction: Documentary
The ABC News Presidential Debate: "ABC News Your Voice Your Vote" – Lily Olszewski (ABC); Trafficked: Underworlds with Mariana van Zeller: "Assassins" – Michael Davie (National Geographic); Trafficked: Underworlds with Mariana van Zeller: "Caught in a Coup" – Robert Muraskin (National Geographic); Trafficked: Underworlds with Mariana van Zeller: "The Drug Mule Scam" – Eric Strauss (National Geographic); "Election Night" – Richard Ablezer, Christian Alicea, Adam Benalt, Marc Greenstein, Adam Mancini, Dawn DiCicco, Kara Kennedy (NBC News); VICE Special Report: "Surviving Nova" – Gilad Thaler (VICE News)	Frida – Carla Gutiérrez (Prime Video); Billy & Molly: An Otter Love Story – Charlie Hamilton James (National Geographic); Daughters – Angela Patton, Natalie Rae (Netflix); Madu – Joel 'Kachi Benson, Matt Ogens (Disney+); American Experience: "Poisoned Ground: The Tragedy at Love Canal" – Jamila Ephron (PBS)
Outstanding Editing: News	Outstanding Editing: Documentary
Fault Lines: "Children of the Darien Gap" – Adrienne Haspel (Al Jazeera International USA); Trafficked: Underworlds with Mariana van Zeller: "Assassins" – Mike Gehman (National Geographic); Trafficked: Underworlds with Mariana van Zeller: "The Drug Mule Scam" – Jeremy Siefer (National Geographic); Trafficked: Underworlds with Mariana van Zeller: "Illegal Gambling" – Alex Hill, Dave Shulman (National Geographic); "Notes of Protest: Afghanistan’s Orchestra in Exile" – Andrew Higgs, Keith Lynch, Rachele Webb, Richard Engel, Gabe Joselow, Marc Smith (NBC News NOW / NBC News)	Blink – Ryan Mullins, Miranda Yousef, Rachelle Hamilton (National Geographic); Apollo 13: Survival – Otto Burham (Netflix); Citizen Nation – Anne Checler, Jane Jo, Benji Kast, Elana Meyers (PBS); Death Without Mercy – Agnieszka Liggett (Showtime); We Will Dance Again – Yasmine Novak, Roy Roy Balbirsky (Paramount+)
Outstanding Graphic Design: News	Outstanding Graphic Design: Documentary
The New York Times Opinion: "You're Being Lied To About Voter Fraud. Here's the Truth." – Neil Makhija, Molly Crabapple, Kim Boekbinder, Jim Batt (The New York Times); "AFP Videographic: The International Criminal Court" – Julie Pereira (AFP); "Four Gazans Show How War Devastated Their Coastline" – Barbara Corbellini Duarte, Robert Leslie, Dorian Barranco, Liz Kraker, Reem Makhoul, Erica Berenstein, Yasser Abu Wazna, Matilda Hay, Mark Abadi, Marisa Frey, Amelia Kosciulek, Clancy Morgan (Business Insider); "The Hidden Autopilot Data That Reveals Why Teslas Crash" – Jacqueline Lin, Ryan Trefes (The Wall Street Journal); Bloomberg News Spotlight: "The Price of Money" – Rubab Shakir, Alex Sears (Bloomberg); "Rohingya Hijras Facing Transphobic Abuse and Sexual Violence" – Laden Anoushfar, Elisa Solinas, Patrick Gallagher, Yukari Schrickel, Meera Senthilingam, Ankur Paliwal (CNN Worldwide)	Omnivore – Margherita Premuroso, Sky Bird, Steven Do, Cindy SooHoo, Trix Taylor, Benjamin Woodlock, Steve Biggert, Rachel Fowler, Javier Gonzalez (Apple TV+); Buy Now! The Shopping Conspiracy – Colin Thornton, Neil Wilson, Ka Hei Heiley Chiu, Sam Jewitt, Chris MacDonald, Hannah Privett, Beth Archibald, Henry Esterson, Yafang Hsueh, Hokun Tsou, Oliver Weinfeld, Katleen Kattnig, Tomas Koza, Assim Kumaka, Nik Maund, Becky Vicars, Ryan Wintle, Orla Smith, Genevieve Weatherburn, J.S. Young (Netflix); Food, Inc. 2 – Virgil Conklin, Ross Henderson, Josh Norton, Riley Carson, Doug Chang, Idil Gozde, Ann Kruetzkamp, Sohyun Park, Brian Landisman, Justin Nixon, Conner O'Brian, Nick Woythaler, Carson Hood, Ayden Ackerman, Adam Afzali, Padraic Driscoll, Casey Drogin, Marvin Perez, Kurt Huggins (Apple TV+); Frida – Sofía Inés Cázares, Renata Galindo (Prime Video); Join or Die – Mark Lopez (Delevan Street Films)
Outstanding Research: News	Outstanding Research: Documentary
"The Hidden Autopilot Data That Reveals Why Teslas Crash" – Frank Matt, Paul Overberg, Emma Scott (The Wall Street Journal); Trafficked: Underworlds with Mariana van Zeller: "Apes" – Eugen Bräunig, Cara Fitts, Jeffrey D. Allen, JJ Kelley, Jeffrey Plunkett, Mariana van Zeller, Paul Burger, Christopher Weeks, Erin Fifer, Mark Levenstein, Paulina Vaca, Robert Muraskin (National Geographic); Frontline: "Breakdown in Maine" – Kristina Abovyan, Julia Arenstam, Katherine Griwert, Steve Mistler, Nicole Reinert, Susan Sharon, John Terhune (PBS); 60 Minutes: "The Cap Arcona" – Marc Lieberman, Warren Lustig, Cassidy McDonald, Bill Whitaker (CBS News); Frontline: "Documenting Police Use of Force" – Martha Bellisle, Reece Dunklin, Ryan J. Foley, Kristin M. Hall, Holbrook Mohr, Aaron Morrison, Mitch Weiss, Roxana Hegeman, Angeliki Kastanis, Justin Pritchard, Rhonda Shafner, Helen Wieffering, Taylor Stevens, Sean Mussenden (PBS); "K File Investigation in North Carolina Governor's Race" – Matthew Phillips, Andrew Kaczynski, Em Steck (CNN Worldwide); Fault Lines: "Starving Gaza" – Júlia Nueno Guitart, Hind Hassan, Peter Polack, Mark Scialla (Al Jazeera International USA)	The Grab – McKenzie Funk, Nathan Halverson, JoeBill Muñoz, Mallory Newman, Amanda Pike, David Ritsher, Emma C. Schwartz, Yinuo Shi (Center for Investigative Reporting Studios); The Bibi Files – Eitan Amrami, Daniel Bellone, Alexis Bloom (Jolt.film); Frontline: "China, The U.S. and the Rise of Xi Jinping" – Scott Anger, Josephine Bradlee, Lily Wang, Elizabeth Hope Williams (PBS); American Experience: "Nazi Town, USA" – Peter Yost, Edna Alburquerque (PBS); Our Oceans – Kate Colley, Zoe Cousins, Inka Cresswell, Asher Flatt, Estelle Ngoumtsa, Ella Potts, Nadia Rashid Aswani, Dr Alex Schnell, Megan Soulsby, Nathalie SwainDiaz, Peter Webster (Netflix)
Outstanding Lighting Direction: News	Outstanding Lighting Direction: Documentary
Trafficked: Underworlds with Mariana van Zeller: "Illegal Gambling" – Frederic Menou, Joshua Flannigan (National Geographic); Trafficked: Underworlds with Mariana van Zeller: "Assassins" – Frederic Menou, Joshua Flannigan (National Geographic); Trafficked: Underworlds with Mariana van Zeller: "Hash Smugglers" – Frederic Menou, Joshua Flannigan (National Geographic); Trafficked: Underworlds with Mariana van Zeller: "Sextortion" – Frederic Menou, Joshua Flannigan (National Geographic)	Hitler and the Nazis: Evil on Trial – Jeff Hutchens (Netflix); American Conspiracy: The Octopus Murders – Brett Jutkiewicz, Chris Messina, Sean Gradwell (Netflix); POV Shorts: "American Seams" – Jared Jakins, Leesie Clegg (PBS); Cold Case: Who Killed JonBenét Ramsey – Jeff Hutchens (Netflix); Separated – Igor Martinović, Carlos Bermudez, Fritz de Jong, Frans Wetterings (MSNBC)
Outstanding Music Composition: Documentary	Outstanding Sound: Documentary
Endurance – Daniel Pemberton (National Geographic); Billy & Molly: An Otter Love Story – Erland Cooper (National Geographic); Photographer: "Dan Winters: Life is Once. Forever." – Bryce Dessner, Oliver Howlett (National Geographic); Frida – Victor Hernández Stumpfhauser (Prime Video); Mafia Spies – Leigh Roberts (Paramount+)	Earthsounds – Marc Anderson, Jonny Crew, Tom Mercer, Tim Owens, Luke O’Connell, Owen Peters, Owen Shirley, Graham Wild, Paul Ackerman, Rory Joseph, Myles Ackerman Smith, Ellie Bowler, Kate Hopkins (Apple TV+); Apollo 13: Survival – Greg Gettens, Rebecca Heathcote, Olly Freemantle, Glen Gathard, Paul Darling (Netflix); Billy & Molly: An Otter Love Story – Renzo Spiteri, Kate Hopkins, Graham Wild (National Geographic); Mammals – Paul Fisher, Oliver Baldwin, Dan Brown, Graham Wild (BBC America / AMC+); Secret World of Sound with David Attenborough – Paul Fisher, Angela Groves, Brian Moseley, Chris Watson, Ioannis Spanos, Ellie Wiiliams (Netflix)
Outstanding Writing: News	Outstanding Writing: Documentary
CBS Sunday Morning: "Empty Rooms" – Steve Hartman (CBS); 60 Minutes: "Dr. Kuznetzov" – Maria Gavrilovic, Sofiia Kochmar, Alex Ortiz, Scott Pelley (CBS News); The Whole Story with Anderson Cooper: "Elephant V. Man" – Nick Paton Walsh (CNN Worldwide); NewsNation Prime: "Growing Broke: Forever Chemicals in America's Heartland" – Ryan Kerr, Natasha Zouves (NewsNation); "A Mother's Tragic Tale from War-Torn Gaza" – Jeremy Diamond, Mick Krever, Abeer Salman (CNN Worldwide); Trafficked: Underworlds with Mariana van Zeller: "Apes" – Jeffrey Plunkett, Robert Muraskin (National Geographic)	Billy & Molly: An Otter Love Story – Charlie Hamilton James (National Geographic); Join or Die – Pete Davis, Rebecca Davis (Delevan Street Films); POV: "King Coal" – Elaine McMillion Sheldon (PBS); Fault Lines: "The Night Won't End" – Laila Al-Arian, Kavitha Chekuru (Al Jazeera International USA); American Experience: "Poisoned Ground: The Tragedy at Love Canal" – Jamila Ephron (PBS); The Space Race – Mark Monroe (National Geographic)
Outstanding Art Direction / Set Decoration / Scenic Design: Documentary	Outstanding Show Open or Title Sequence: News
The New York Times Opinion: "You're Being Lied To About Voter Fraud. Here's the Truth." – Neil Makhija, Jim Batt, Kim Boekbinder, Molly Crabpple (The New York Times); Apollo 13: Survival – Fiona Albrow, Beck Rainford, Mert L. Balta (Netflix); Glitter and Greed: The Lisa Frank Story – Brian Hodge, Chloe Reisen (Prime Video); Hitler and the Nazis: Evil on Trial – Rita Viktória Hetényi, Bernadett Redenczki, Janka Erdély (Netflix); Separated – Eugenio Caballero (MSNBC); The New York Times Opinion: "This Is What a Nuclear Strike Would Feel Like" – Jonah Kessel, Axel Sence, Swann Valenza (The New York Times)	"Election Night Live with Brian Williams" – Dan Hoffman, Brian Potter, Jonathan Wald, Mitchell Brooks, Pier De Sanctis, Rosie Nakamura, Autumn Nakmura, Daron Nealis, Ben Casey, Joe Anton, Yagmur Kaplan, Brian Williams (Prime Video); "2024 Total Solar Eclipse: Through the Eyes of NASA" – Sami Aziz, Emily Furfaro, Joy Ng, Beth Anthony (NASA+); Trafficked: Underworlds with Mariana van Zeller: "Assassins" – Mike Gehman, Alfie Koetter, Michael Davie, Jeffrey Plunkett (National Geographic); Trafficked: Underworlds with Mariana van Zeller: "Migrant Smugglers" – Hunter Gross, Alfie Koetter, Erik Osterholm, Jeffrey Plunkett (National Geographic); "Total Eclipse of the Heartland" – Wesley Carlton, Thomas Keeley, Ana Sandoval, Stefanie Toigo, Gabriel Almanzar, Sungkyu Koo (CBS); Impact X Nightline: "What Happened to Karen Silkwood: The Lost Tapes" – Mary Marsh, Scott A. Levy, Jodie Charity, Alberto Reyes, Nick Barber, Zoe Chevalier, Eman Varoqua (ABC / Hulu)
Outstanding Promotional Announcement: News	Outstanding Promotional Announcement: Documentary
ABC World News Tonight with David Muir: "No Fear" (ABC); "Election Night" (ABC News); Good Morning America: "I'M IN (Image Campaign)" (ABC); ABC News Studios: "Sins of the Parents: The Crumbley Trials" (Hulu); "Decision 2024 – Steve Kornacki Brand Campaign" (MSNBC)	Billy & Molly: An Otter Love Story (National Geographic); Blink (National Geographic); ABC News Studios: "Brats" (Hulu); The Grab (Center for Investigative Reporting Studios); ABC News Studios: "Patrice: The Movie" (Hulu); Tsunami: Race Against Time (National Geographic)
Outstanding Technical Excellence: News
NBC News: "Election Night Coverage" (NBC News); "America Decides, Election '24" (CBS News); "CNN Presidential Debate: President Joe Biden & Former President Donald J. Trump" (CNN Worldwide); Noticias Telemundo: "Harris o Trump: Batalla Final Decision 2024" (Telemundo); Trafficked: Underworlds with Mariana van Zeller (National Geographic)

=== Regional News ===
Outstanding Regional News Story: Breaking/Spot News	Outstanding Regional News Story: Investigative
"Jet Crash on I-75" (WINK News – Fort Myers, Florida / Suncoast Emmy Awards); "Deadly Tornado Coverage" (KCCI – Des Moines, Iowa / Mid-America Emmy Awards); "Lakewood Church Shooting" (KPRC-TV – Houston, Texas / Lone Star Emmy Awards); "North Texas Tornadoes" (WFAA – Dallas, Texas / Lone Star Emmy Awards); "This Is Not Normal" (KUSA – Denver, Colorado / Heartland Emmy Awards)	"In Plane Sight" (WANF-TV – Atlanta, Georgia / Southeast Emmy Awards); "Coroner's Criminal Past" (WWL-TV – New Orleans, Louisiana / Mid-America Emmy Awards); "Disabled in Danger" (WFAA – Dallas, Texas / Lone Star Emmy Awards); "Double Injustice" (WVUE-DT – New Orleans, Louisiana / Mid-America Emmy Awards); "KARE 11 Investigates: Nowhere to Turn" (KARE-TV – Minneapolis, Minnesota / Upper Midwest Emmy Awards); "Spit Hoods Can Be Deadly. Police Still Use Them Anyway" (WTSP-TV – St. Petersburg, Florida / Suncoast Emmy Awards)
Outstanding Regional Documentary
The Holly (Rocky Mountain Public Media – Denver, Colorado / Heartland Emmy Awards); Angels Too Soon (WTTW / PBS – Chicago, Illinois / Chicago / Midwest Emmy Awards); Desde Cero: The Migrant Journey in Chicago (WMAQ – Chicago, Illinois / Chicago / Midwest Emmy Awards); STEPS: OKC Thunder (Oklahoma City Thunder – Oklahoma City, Oklahoma / Heartland Emmy Awards); A Towering Task: The Story of the Peace Corps (Rocky Mountain Public Media – Denver, Colorado / Heartland Emmy Awards)
