= Nawal =

Nawal or Nawaal (Arabic: نوال nawāl) is Arabic female given name literally meaning "unmerited favour of God" or "gift, grant, present, donation, award, offering" or also could mean "state or quality of being kind, act of kindness beyond what is due" or "grace, kindness, favour, charity". The name is actually an infinitive form of the adjective which stems from verb نَالَ nāla, meaning "to accomplish, achieve, earn, gain, receive

In Hindustani, Nawal (नवल) means 'new'. This name is used in many countries such as Pakistan, India, Saudi Arabia and other Muslim countries throughout the world.

Notable people with the name include:

== Given name ==
- Nawal (musician) (born 1965), Comorian musician
- Nawaal Akram (born 1998/99), Qatari comedian and model
- Nawal Kishore Dhawal (1911–1964), Indian writer
- Nawal Farih (born 1988), Belgian politician
- Nawal Ben Hamou (born 1987), Belgian politician
- Nawal al-Hawsawi, Saudi Arabian pilot and activist
- Nawal Hijazi, Lebanese voice actress
- Nawal El Jack (born 1988), Sudanese sprinter
- Nawal El Kuwaitia (born 1966), Kuwaiti singer
- Nawal Al-Maghafi (born 1990), Yemeni-British journalist and documentary filmmaker
- Nawal Mansouri (born 1985), Algerian volleyball player
- Nawal Meniker (born 1997), French track and field athlete
- Nawal El Moutawakel (born 1962), Moroccan hurdler
- Nawal Nasrallah, Iraqi food writer
- Nawal M. Nour (born 1966), Sudanese-American obstetrician and gynecologist
- Nawal Kishore Rai (1960–2022), Indian politician
- Nawal El Saadawi (1931–2021), Egyptian feminist
- Nawal Saeed (born 1998), Pakistani actress and model
- Nawal Kishor Sah (born 1947), Nepalese politician
- Nawal Kishore Sharma (1925–2012), Indian politician
- Nawal Kishore Singh, Indian politician
- Nawal Slaoui (born 1966), Moroccan skier
- Nawal Soufi (born 1988), Moroccan-Italian social worker and human rights activist
- Nawwal bint Tariq (born 1951), Omani royal
- Nawal El Tatawy (born 1942), Egyptian economist
- Nawal Al Zoghbi (born 1971), Lebanese singer
