= Gliha =

Gliha is a Slovene surname. Notable people with the surname include:

- Erik Gliha (born 1997), Slovenian football player
- Lori Jane Gliha, American television journalist
- Oton Gliha (1914–1999), Slovenian-born Croatian artist
- Primož Gliha (born 1967), Slovenian football player and manager
