= Leila Molana-Allen =

British journalist, foreign correspondent

- Born: London, England
- Education: University of Oxford (BA); Columbia School of Journalism (MS)
- Occupations: Journalist, foreign war correspondent
- Years active: 2011–present
- Notable credit(s): PBS; BBC News; Al Jazeera; FRANCE 24
- Website: leilamolanaallen.com

Leila Molana-Allen is a British roving foreign war correspondent, journalist, and video and photojournalist, based in Beirut and Baghdad. She is British–Iranian, and covers topics on social instability and recovery in conflict zones, displacement, and women's rights across the Middle East, Eastern Europe, and Africa. In 2024, she was nominated for twoEmmy Awards for her coverage on PBS's On the Brink and Sudan's Civil War.

== Early life and education ==
Leila Molana-Allen was born in London, England, to a British father and Iranian mother. She attended St. Paul's School for Girls in Edgbaston, Birmingham, England.

Molana-Allen received a BA degree in ancient and modern history from the University of Oxford, and an MS degree from Columbia University's Graduate School of Journalism in 2011.

== Career ==
Before joining PBS News Hour, Molana-Allen was a foreign correspondent for The Economist, BBC News, and a Middle East correspondent for France 24. She has also worked as a freelance journalist reporting for Al Jazeera and The Telegraph, among others. Molana-Allen has covered topics including Sudan's civil war, the fall of the Assad regime in Syria, the October 7 attacks, and women's rights.

In 2023, Molana-Allen reported from the front lines of the Israel-Gaza war, uncovering the aftermath of the October 7, 2023 terror attacks and investigating human rights abuses in Jerusalem and the West Bank. She won a Peabody Award for the PBS one-hour special report, War in the Holy Land.

In 2024, Molana-Allen crossed into Syria on the front lines reporting from cities and villages to interview people caught in the middle of the violence in the days following the collapse of the Assad regime as well as reporting on Sudan's civil war and humanitarian crisis. That same year she was nominated for two Emmy Awards for On the Brink (Hezbollah–Israel conflict) for Outstanding Breaking News Coverage and for PBS's Sudan's Civil War for Outstanding Continuing News Coverage - Long Form. She was also a recipient of the CFWIJ Kathy Gannon Legacy Award for reporting in the Middle East for PBS.

In 2025, Molana-Allen won a Shifa Gardi Award for Conflict Journalist of the Year. Rudaw grants the award each year to a prominent female war correspondent. In 2026, she won a duPont-Columbia Award for her coverage in The PBS series, The Fall of Assad.

== Awards ==
Year	Nominated work	Category	Award	Result
2026	The Fall of Assad		duPont-Columbia Award	Won
2025		Conflict Journalist of the Year	Shifa Gardi Award	Won
2024	Sudan's Civil War	Outstanding Continuing News Coverage - Long Form	Emmy Award	Nominated
2024	On the Brink	Outstanding Breaking News Coverage	Emmy Award	Nominated
2025		Conflict Journalist of the Year	Shifa Gardi Award	Won
2024		PBS Journalist Covering the Middle East	CFWIJ Kathy Gannon Legacy Award	Won
2023	War in the Holy Land		Peabody Award	Won
