= Madu (film) =

2024 Nigerian documentary film

Madu is a 2024 Nigerian documentary film which follows the journey of a twelve-year-old Nigerian ballet dancer, Anthony Madu, whose story broke the internet in 2020 with a video of him dancing in the rain. The documentary, directed by Matthew Ogens and Joel Kachi Benson, premiered on Disney+ on Friday 29 March 2024. It proceeded to win an Emmy Award for Outstanding Arts and Culture Documentary at the 2025 News and Documentary Emmy Awards in New York City.

== Synopsis ==
Madu features Anthony Madu, whose ballet dance video went viral in 2020 after he was captured dancing in the rain and earned a scholarship at Elmhurst Ballet School. The more-than-an-hour documentary film shines light on Anthony Madu's journey from his home in Ajangbadi, Lagos state, to the United Kingdom. The film highlights Anthony Madu's experiences in the United Kingdom as he navigates his new environment and the new culture he is living in, in the United Kingdom.

== Selected cast ==
- Anthony Madu
- Matthew Ogens
- Joel Kachi Benson

== Release date ==
Though Madu had its first screening at the 2024 iREP International Documentary Film Festival in Lagos, Nigeria, the film premiered globally on 29 March 2024 on Disney+.

== Awards and nominations ==
Year	Award	Category	Recipient	Result	Ref
2025	Emmy Awards	Outstanding Direction (Documentary)	Matthew Ogens, Joel Kachi Benson, Jamie Patricof, Katie McNeill, Rachel Halilej	Nominated	
2025	Emmy Awards	Outstanding Arts and Culture Documentary	Matthew Ogens, Joel Kachi Benson, Jamie Patricof, Katie McNeill, Rachel Halilej	Won	
