= The Donlon Report =

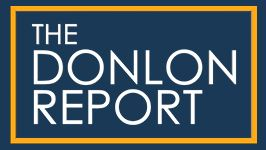
- Presented by: Joe Donlon

Production
- Production locations: WGN-TV Studios, Chicago
- Running time: 60 minutes
- Production company: Nexstar Media Group

Original release
- Network: NewsNation
- Release: March 1, 2021 – March 25, 2022

The Donlon Report was a nightly American television news program on NewsNation, which premiered on March 1, 2021. The one-hour-long program was hosted by Joe Donlon, and aired at 6 p.m. ET.

The cable network WGN America was rebranded to NewsNation by its corporate parent Nexstar Media Group on the same day and expand to five hours of live news programming.

The expansion in programming was a move to compete against other U.S. Cable News programs. The Donlon Report went against largely opinion-based programs in that timeslot: The Situation Room with Wolf Blitzer on CNN, The Beat with Ari Melber on MSNBC and Special Report with Bret Baier on Fox News.

The show replaced reruns of Last Man Standing.

On March 15, 2022, Donlon decided to leave NewsNation. His last show on The Donlon Report aired on March 25, 2022. On March 28, 2022, NewsNation Rush Hour will replace The Donlon Report at 6 PM ET, and it currently airs from 5–7 PM ET.

== Format ==
NewsNation has stated the show took an “in-depth look at the news events of the day” mixed with interviews from experts who added "insight and perspective.” Unlike Donlon's anchoring of the previous three hour news block now titled NewsNation Prime, Donlon commented on the news, and used the first portion of every program as a brief monologue on the top story covered. Unlike the other NewsNation newscasts, Donlon did not necessarily seek to provide balance on each night but strived to incorporate different viewpoints over a longer period. NewsNation has been using its 5,500 local journalists at Nexstar Media Group stations across the country to provide content since the primetime broadcast premiered in September 2020.

== Host ==
Joe Donlon moved from the show's primetime broadcast to his own show. Before NewsNation, Donlon was the main anchor at Chicago's WGN-TV for three years. He spent 21 years at KGW in Portland, Oregon before moving to Chicago. Donlon has been criticized for his soft interviewing and alleged insufficient challenges to false claims. After NewsNation, Donlon became the lead male anchor for Chicago CBS-owned station WBBM-TV, rejoining Jennifer Lyons, the former news director at NewsNation now with the same role at WBBM, and Albert Ramon, chief meteorologist who formerly served that role on NewsNation.
