= Natasha Zouves =

American broadcast journalist

- Education: University of Southern California (BA, BS); Johns Hopkins University
- Occupation: Broadcast journalist
- Website: nzouves.com

Natasha Zouves is an American broadcast journalist. She was a network anchor and investigative reporter at NewsNation from June 2022 to June 2026. She was honored as a John S. Knight Journalism Fellow at Stanford, and earned a Master of Biotechnology Enterprise and Entrepreneurship from Johns Hopkins University in 2019. Zouves was previously a news anchor and reporter for KGO-TV (ABC7 News) in San Francisco, California.

== Early life and education ==
Zouves grew up in the San Francisco Bay Area. She is of Greek and Chinese descent.

Zouves attended the University of Southern California, where she won a scholarship from the Asian American Journalists Association, was a Renaissance Scholar, and graduated Phi Beta Kappa and magna cum laude from the USC Annenberg School for Communication and Journalism, with a double major in Broadcast Journalism and Health Promotion & Disease Prevention.

In 2019, Zouves earned a Master of Biotechnology Enterprise and Entrepreneurship from Johns Hopkins University.

== Professional career ==
Zouves worked at San Diego's KGTV (10News-ABC) from 2013 to late in the summer of 2015, as both a reporter and an anchor.

In July 2015 she was hired to work as a reporter and anchor for San Francisco's KGO-ABC7 News. She and Reggie Aqui started anchoring the morning show on December 21, 2015.

In addition to her role as a news anchor, her reporting work encompassed topics such as the housing crisis’s effect on domestic violence survivors’ ability to leave their abusers. She highlighted stories of resilience, bringing together two men who jumped from the Golden Gate Bridge and survived. Her storytelling at KGO-ABC7 News was honored with two Emmy Awards.

Zouves sustained a serious concussion shortly after finishing a newscast in 2018, recovering and returning to work in early 2019. She wrote of the experience, "I am hopeful that, by opening up about the details of my injury and recovery, I'm able to shed some light and awareness and let others know they're not alone." She recounted the experience in a Medium post.

In September 2019, Zouves left ABC7 News, having been selected for the John S. Knight Fellowship at Stanford University.

Beginning in June 2022, Zouves anchored NewsNation Prime on Saturdays and Sundays. She also worked as an investigative correspondent. In June 2026, she left NewsNation after four years with the network. Following her departure, she began publishing a Substack newsletter.

== Personal life ==
She is involved in the community and has participated and served as an MC in many events, such as kicking off the March of Dimes March for Babies walk in San Francisco. She emceed the Leukemia and Lymphoma Society's Light the Night event in San Francisco, which raised more than $2 million to find a cure for blood cancer. She has also been heavily involved with the Special Olympics, and has emceed multiple events.

== Awards ==
In 2015, Zouves received an Emmy in San Diego. She received two further Emmys in June 2018, for feature news report, light series and for news writing.

In 2025, Zouves received the News & Documentary Emmy Award for Outstanding Emerging Journalist. The NewsNation investigation Growing Broke: Forever Chemicals in America's Heartland, reported by Zouves, received a 2025 National Edward R. Murrow Award for Excellence in Video.
