= Mariana van Zeller =

Portuguese journalist (born 1976)

- Van Zeller in Colombia, in 2021
- Born: Mariana van Zeller; May 7, 1976 (age 50); Cascais, Portugal
- Education: Columbia University Graduate School of Journalism (MA) and Universidade Lusíada de Lisboa (BA)
- Occupations: Correspondent, journalist
- Years active: 2000–present
- Notable credit(s): National Geographic; Fusion; Vanguard
- Spouse: Darren Foster
- Children: 1
- Awards: Peabody Award, Emmy Award

Mariana van Zeller (born May 7, 1976) is a Portuguese-American journalist and correspondent for National Geographic Channel. She was the chief correspondent for Fusion (until the channel ceased its operations in December 2021), and is a former correspondent for the Vanguard documentary series on the former Current TV. She's a recipient of the Peabody Award and multiple News & Documentary Emmy Awards with Trafficked.

== Biography ==
Born on May 7, 1976, in Cascais, Portugal, van Zeller studied international relations at the Universidade Lusíada de Lisboa. After graduation, she says she spent two years working at SIC, which was at that time the first and largest Portuguese private television network. She began working in the travel and international departments of the main networks channel and later joined SIC Notícias, the network's news channel.

She applied for a master's degree at Columbia University Graduate School of Journalism three times: her first application was rejected, and her second was wait-listed. According to van Zeller herself, after her third application, in 2001, she flew to New York City and knocked on the dean's door, explaining her dream of becoming a journalist in the United States. The dean was impressed, according to her, and allowed her to enroll.

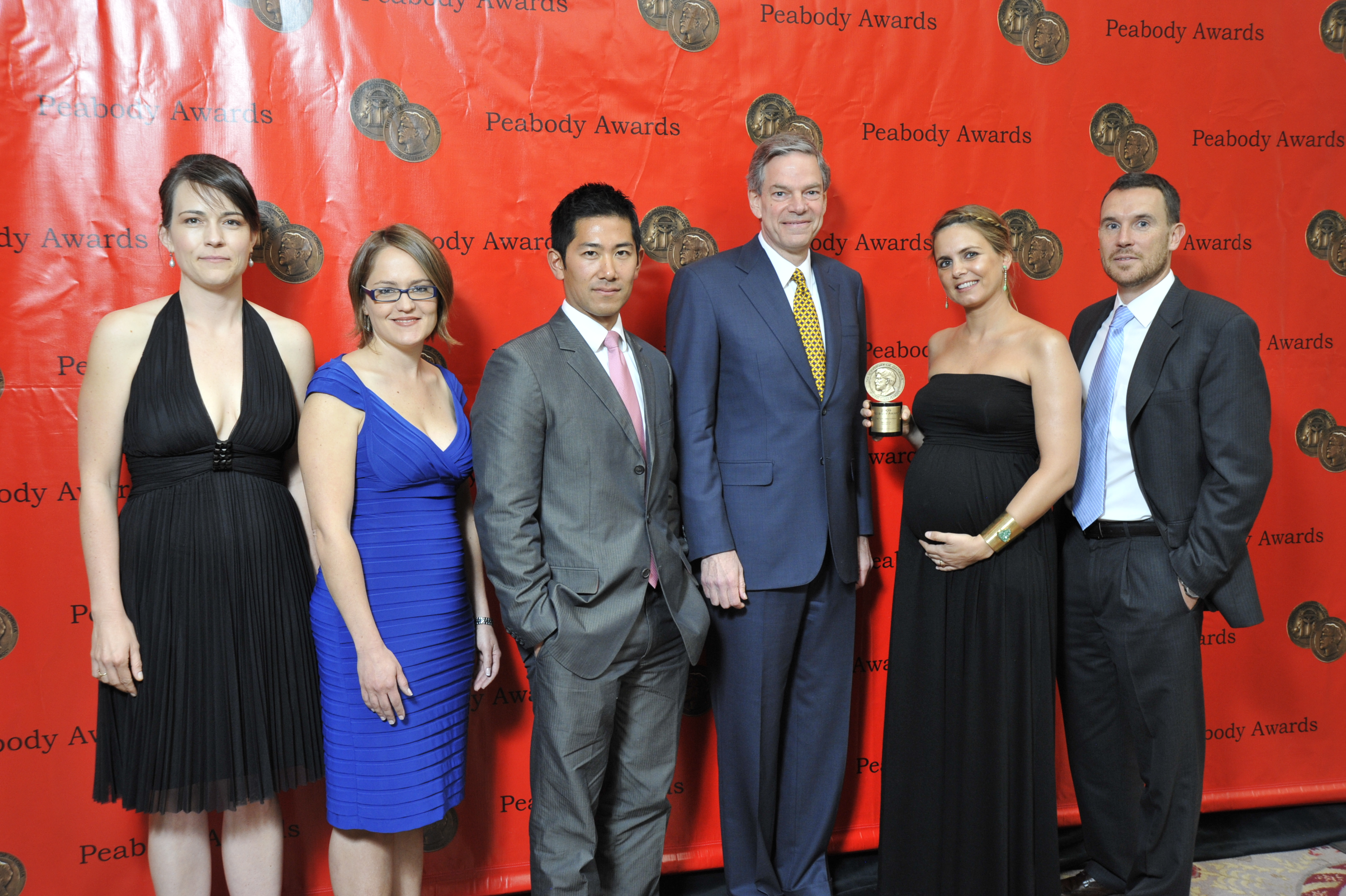
Cerissa Tanner, Benita Sills, Adam Yamaguchi, Joel Hyatt, van Zeller, and Darren Foster at the 69th Annual Peabody Awards for The OxyContin Express

One month after she moved to New York City, the September 11 attacks took place. She was contacted that morning by a producer from SIC Notícias, where she had previously interned, and was directed to meet a news crew atop the CBS Building in Midtown Manhattan, where she would go live in three hours. Before going on air, she was told, "Prepare yourself. The whole of Portugal is watching you."

After receiving her degree from Columbia, van Zeller moved to London to work for a documentary producer, with hopes of covering the Iraq War. With London as her new base, she studied Arabic at Damascus University in Syria in order to better seek out stories in the Middle East. Over the next two years, her freelance documentaries from Syria appeared on PBS's Frontline/World, the CBC, and Channel 4 (United Kingdom). In 2005, she joined Current TV as a correspondent and producer for the Vanguard documentary series.

Van Zeller is fluent in Portuguese, English, Spanish, Italian, and French. She also speaks some Arabic.

== Personal life ==
Van Zeller is married to her former Columbia classmate Darren Foster, who is a series producer and director with National Geographic Channel. In July 2010, she gave birth to their child, a son named Vasco.

She became an American citizen on March 17, 2015.

== Filmography ==
- Vanguard (2008–2013)
- Narco Bling (2012)
- Obama's Army
- El Chapo: CEO of Crime (2013)
- Inside: Secret America (2013), also known as Undercover USA
- Pimp City: A Journey to the Center of the Sex Slave Trade (2014)
- Trafficked with Mariana van Zeller (2020–2024)
- Trafficked: Underworlds With Mariana van Zeller (2024–2025)

== Awards ==
Year	Award	Organization	Work	Category	Result
2008	Livingston Award for Young Journalists	Mollie Parnis Livingston Foundation	Reporting on the Iran–Iraq border	Best International Reporting	Nominated
2009	Webby Award	International Academy of Digital Arts and Sciences	"Obama's Army"	News & Politics: Individual Episodes	Won
2010	Peabody Award	Henry W. Grady College of Journalism and Mass Communication	"The OxyContin Express"		Won
2011	"Greatest Person of the Day"	Huffington Post			Won
2011	Livingston Award for Young Journalists	Mollie Parnis Livingston Foundation	"Rape on the Reservation"		Won

"The OxyContin Express" also received the 2010 Television Academy Honor, a Prism Award and an Emmy nomination.
