= What's Next? The Future with Bill Gates =

- Promotional release poster
- Genre: Documentary
- Presented by: Bill Gates

Production
- Executive producers: Morgan Neville, Caitrin Rogers, Eve Marson
- Producers: Jonathan Formica, Rachel Rapkin

Original release
- Network: Netflix
- Release: September 18, 2024 – present

What's Next? The Future with Bill Gates is a 2024 documentary series hosted by Bill Gates which explores contemporary societal issues including artificial intelligence and income inequality.
