= Andrew Harding =

British journalist and author

Andrew Harding is a British journalist and author. As of May 2024 he is the Paris correspondent for BBC News.

== Career ==
Harding was a foreign correspondent for the BBC in Russia as of July 2000. He spent a decade living in the former Soviet Union (in Moscow and Tbilisi) before becoming the BBC's East Africa correspondent in 2000, then Asia correspondent in 2004, and in 2009, Africa correspondent.

Harding has written three non-fiction books: The Mayor of Mogadishu, about the city of Mogadishu; These Are Not Gentle People, about a murder in South Africa; and A Small, Stubborn Town, about a town in Ukraine.

== Recognition and awards ==
In 2014 Harding received a US Emmy Award for outstanding feature story in a regular newscast.
