= Shifa Zikri Ibrahim =

Kurdish journalist (1986–2017)

Shifa Gardi
- شیفا زکری ابراهیم
- Shifa Gardi reporting from Mosul, Iraq
- Born: Shifa Zikri Ibrahim; 1 July 1986; Ziveh, Silvaneh, Iran
- Died: 25 February 2017 (aged 30); Roadside, Western Mosul, Iraq
- Cause of death: Roadside bomb explosion while reporting
- Burial place: Iraqi Kurdistan
- Other name: Shifa Zirki Gardi
- Citizenship: Iraq
- Education: Salahaddin University, Erbil
- Occupations: Journalist, News anchor, Reporter
- Years active: 2006–2017
- Employer: Rudaw Media Network
- Known for: War reporting, anchoring Focus Mosul, covering the Battle of Mosul (2016–2017)
- Notable work: Focus Mosul (Rudaw)
- Style: Investigative journalism, frontline war reporting
- Television: Rudaw Media Network
- Awards: Martyr of Journalism Award (posthumous)

Notes
- One of the few female journalists covering the frontlines in Iraq

Shifa Zikri Ibrahim, also known as Shifa Gardi (July 1, 1986 – February 25, 2017), an Iraqi-Kurdish television presenter and journalist who was working for Rudaw Media Network in western Mosul, Iraq, was killed by a roadside bomb while reporting during the Iraq War.

== Personal ==
Shifa Zikri Ibrahim, also known as Shifa Gardi, was born a refugee in Iran on July 1, 1986. She was a graduate of media department from Salahaddin University in Erbil. She started her media career in 2006, and joined Rudaw Media Network from its inception.

== Career ==
Shifa Gardi began her media career in 2006. She joined Rudaw Media Network at the beginning of its foundation. She worked as an Iraqi-Kurdish reporter and Kurdish-language anchor for Rudaw TV. She later became a segment presenter in Rudaw, covering Focus Mosul program which she started to run when the operation to drive Islamic State of Iraq and the Levant from Iraq was launched in October 2016. She often reported from the front lines of the war against the Islamic State, which made her popular. Gardi was also the presenter of Focus Mosul, a special daily news program focusing on the battle to recapture Mosul from the Islamic State of Iraq and the Levant.

== Death ==
Shifa Gardi was killed in Mosul, which is shown in Iraq relative to the capital city Baghdad.

Gardi's death occurred during an offensive by Iraqi forces trying to recapture Mosul from ISIS. Gardi and cameraman Mustafa had been making a report about the so-called "Valley of Death," an area 20 kilometers south of Mosul and five kilometers from the main Baghdad-Mosul road that is believed to have been used by ISIS for mass executions. As Gardi was getting comments from a Shiite Hashd al-Shaabi commander beside a huge hole where ISIS militants were said to have dumped the bodies of people they had killed, the commander's feet happened to wrap in a wire, leading to the denotation of a bomb, killing Gardi. This incident happened at 3:45 p.m. on Saturday.

Ranja Jamal, another Rudaw reporter who was also in Mosul when Gardi died explained that she had been given information regarding the valley but was not able to find it. On her way back, she came across a Hashd al-Shaabi force, and asked them about the place. They told her that they knew about the place and guided her to the spot. Along with Gardi, the bombing also killed five other members of a paramilitary force who had led her to the site. Another eight people, including Rudaw TV cameraman Yunis Mustafa, were injured, according to Rudaw TV and news reports.

Rudaw Executive Director Ako Mohamm said, "We were always urging them to be behind the front lines of the war, telling them that they were not soldiers or Peshmerga fighters. It appears that Shifa had moved closer to the front lines out of seriousness to her job."

== Context ==
Gardi was one of the female journalists who were covering the counteroffensive against ISIS inside Iraq for Rudaw. Her colleagues remembered the compassion she showed in her work. Once instance involved a wounded animal. Gardi called attention to the effects of war on rabbit and said, "The rabbit is suffering from malnutrition which has caused visible damage to its face. I brought it back with me. We will be treating the rabbit and then give it to an animal protection agency which is willing to look after it," she said.

Others made note of her role as a woman in war journalism. Bayan Sami Rahman, the Kurdish government's representative to the United States and a former journalist, tweeted that Kurdistan "has lost a courageous and professional journalist who cracked the glass ceiling."

Falah Mustafa, minister of the foreign relations department for the Kurdistan Regional Government, described Gardi in a tweet as a "role model to young women."

Rudaw praised the groundbreaking aspects of her career, saying, “Journalism remains male-dominated — Shifa Gardi broke those perceptions & stereotypes — we pay tribute to her courageous journalism.”

== Impact ==
Gardi's killing was the first recorded war-related death of a journalist in Iraq in 2017, the committee to Protect Journalists said. At least six were killed in the country last year. The bomb also wounded her cameraman Younis Mustafa who was transferred to Erbil, the nearby capital of Iraq's autonomous Kurdish region where the channel is headquartered.

== Reactions ==
Iraqi Prime Minister Haider al-Abadi said, "We are determined to follow the terrorism that is trying to kill our sons and our citizens everywhere."

Ako Mohamm, executive director at Rudaw, said, "We are saddened by the passing of Shifa. Her place will remain irreplaceable in Rudaw, but she will always stay in our hearts."

Brett H. McGurk, a US special presidential envoy involved with counter-terrorism, said, "She was everything ISIS fears: a journalist exposing their lies."

Kurdish Deputy Prime Minister Qubad Talabani, said,"She joins a list of irreplaceable people lost in this war."

== See also ==
- Human rights in Iraq
- Women in journalism
