= Nawal Kishore Singh =

Indian politician

Member (MLA) of Bihar Legislative Assembly
- In office 1952–1957
- Preceded by: N/A
- Succeeded by: Saryoo Nandan Prasad Singh
- Constituency: Mokama

Personal details
- Born: Mor, Mokama, Patna District
- Party: Indian National Congress

Nawal Kishore Singh was an Indian politician. Born in village Mor, Mokama he was a Landlord of Mokama and belong to Bhumihar caste. He was elected to the First Member of the Bihar Legislative Assembly from Mokama.

== Attributed state-run institutions and monuments ==
- Naval Kishore College, Mokama
- Naval Kishore Balika High School, Mokama, Patna
- Naval Kishore High School, Patna
