= Vaughn Hillyard =

American TV journalist

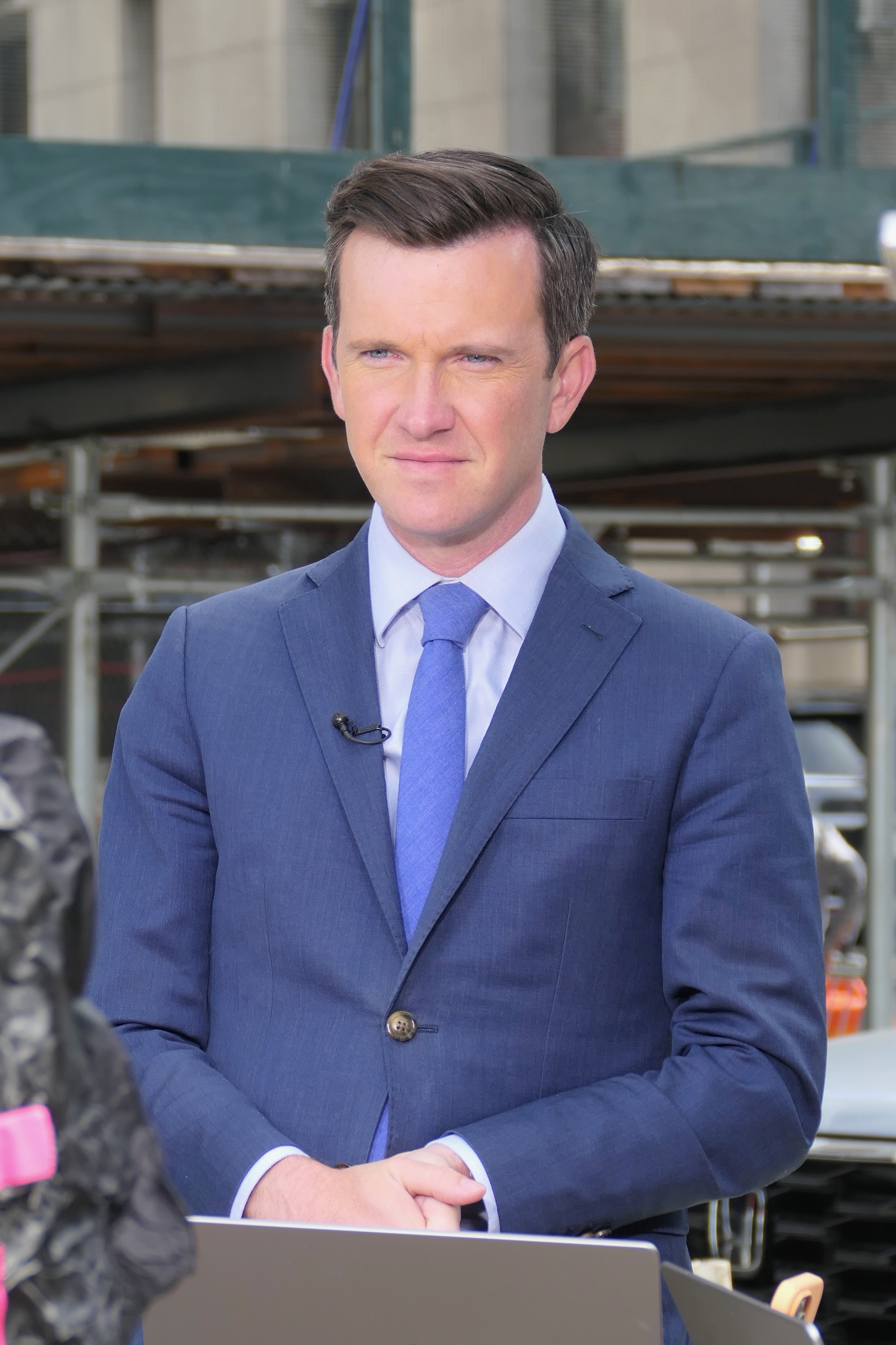
- Education: Arizona State University
- Occupation: Journalist
- Employer: MS NOW

Vaughn Hillyard is an American journalist working as a White House correspondent at MS NOW. He has been with the network since 2013 and has held different positions covering political journalism.

== Early life and education ==
Hillyard graduated from Thunderbird High School in Phoenix, Arizona in 2009. While at Thunderbird, he was the editor of the student newspaper, The Challenge; when the school district refused to print a story criticizing school officials, Hillyard challenged the decision, and the story was printed 10 months later. He attended the Walter Cronkite School of Journalism and Mass Communication at Arizona State University (ASU), during which time he interned for The Arizona Republic. Hillyard graduated from ASU with bachelor's and master's degrees in 2013. Hillyard is a third generation resident of Arizona.

== Career ==
Hillyard joined NBC News in 2013. Hillyard covered the 2016 and 2020 US election cycles, and was an embedded campaign reporter for the presidential campaign of Ted Cruz and the vice presidential campaign of Mike Pence. In 2021, he was promoted to a correspondent covering the same stories.

In 2023, Vanity Fair reported that Donald Trump grabbed Hillyard's phones and threw them to the side in response to repeated questions.

In 2025, he was named NBC White House correspondent. He was named a senior White House correspondent for MSNBC in advance of its spinoff from Comcast and sister network NBC News.

== Personal ==
Hillyard disclosed his sexual orientation in 2017 and came out as gay. He got married in 2023 to Devan Cayea who is the managing director of the CEO of Accenture. On April 4, 2026, his son Hudson Hillyard-Cayea was born in Arizona.

== Awards ==
Hillyard was inducted into the Walter Cronkite School of Journalism and Mass Communication's Alumni Hall of Fame, for commitment to journalism and significant contributions serving the public with accurate information.
