= Trafficked with Mariana van Zeller =

- Genre: Docuseries
- Created by: Mariana van Zeller
- Country of origin: United States
- No. of seasons: 5
- No. of episodes: 51

Production
- Executive producer: Mariana van Zeller
- Running time: 45 minutes

Original release
- Network: National Geographic
- Release: December 2, 2020 – September 20, 2025

Trafficked with Mariana van Zeller, also known as Trafficked: Underworlds with Mariana van Zeller (as of season 4), is an American documentary television series about trafficking and black markets. It covers topics like drugs, human organs, guns, surgery, and stolen cars, among others. The show is hosted by investigative journalist Mariana van Zeller and is aired by National Geographic. The first season aired in 2020 and five seasons of the show have been produced as of 2025. Trafficked have 29 nominations and wins multiple News & Documentary Emmy Awards.

== Plot ==
Journalist Mariana van Zeller explores the intricacies of the world's most dangerous black markets. In each episode, she investigates a different underworld – from drug trafficking, human organs, weapons, or parts of the human body, to contract killers, sexual extortion, and bride smuggling. In each episode, the journalist meets with the players involved to learn about the business and better understand the global shadow economies.

== Episodes ==
=== Season 1 (2020–2021) ===
- S1.E1: Scams
- S1.E2: Fentanyl
- S1.E3: Counterfeiting
- S1.E4: Steroids
- S1.E5: Pimps
- S1.E6: Cocaine
- S1.E7: Tigers
- S1.E8: Guns
- S1.E9: Mariana van Zeller Investigates

=== Season 2 (2021–2022) ===
- S2.E1: Black Market Surgery
- S2.E2: Romance Scams
- S2.E3: Black Market Marijuana
- S2.E4: Outlaw Motorcycle Clubs
- S2.E5: Meth
- S2.E6: White Supremacy
- S2.E7: Stolen Cars
- S2.E8: Cocaine Queens
- S2.E9: Amazon Mafia
- S2.E10: Fish Pirates

=== Season 3 (2023) ===
- S3.E1: Black Market Organs
- S3.E2: LSD
- S3.E3: Ghost Guns
- S3.E4: Terrorist Oil
- S3.E5: MDMA
- S3.E6: Black Market Babies
- S3.E7: Cyber Pirates
- S3.E8: Gangs
- S3.E9: Crypto Scams
- S3.E10: Fight Clubs
- S3.E11: Embracing the unexpected
- S3.E12: Behind the mask

=== Season 4 (2024) ===
- S4.E1: Assassins
- S4.E2: Sextortion
- S4.E3: Body Parts
- S4.E4: Black Market Meds
- S4.E5: Apes
- S4.E6: Migrant Smugglers
- S4.E7: Hash Smugglers
- S4.E8: Illegal Gambling
- S4.E9: The Drug Mule Scam
- S4.E10: Caught in an African Coup

=== Season 5 (2025) ===
- S5.E1: Cartel USA
- S5.E2: Scam City
- S5.E3: The Tranq Dope Underground
- S5.E4: Brides for Sale
- S5.E5: Million Dollar Highway Heists
- S5.E6: Inside America's Militias
- S5.E7: The Great American Rehab Scam
- S5.E8: Black Market Love
- S5.E9: Underground Street Racing
- S5.E10: Shark Hunters

== See also ==
- List of National Geographic original programming
- Hamilton's Pharmacopeia
