= Adam Yamaguchi =

American television correspondent and producer

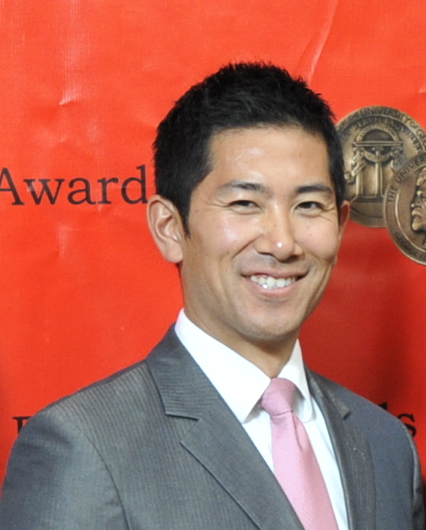
Yamaguchi at the 69th Annual Peabody Awards

Adam Yamaguchi is an American television journalist and producer. He was a correspondent and producer for the Peabody Award winning series Vanguard on Current TV, a former cable network founded by US Vice President Al Gore.

== Early life ==
Born in Los Angeles, California, Yamaguchi graduated from UCLA with degrees in economics as well as communications. While attending UCLA, he served as editor-in-chief at the Daily Bruin newspaper from 1998 to 1999.

== Career ==
Yamaguchi has worked at Fox Sports, CNN and TV Asahi Japan, as well as a freelance journalist for various agencies while traveling in pursuit of stories. He has covered the Space Shuttle Columbia disaster, the 2000 presidential election and September 11 attacks as well as other major U.S. events.

Yamaguchi has also covered international events, including the wars in Afghanistan and Iraq, indigenous cultures in the Amazon, Argentina's economic collapse, the Inuit whale hunt, suicide in Japan, the Rohingya genocide, North Korean defectors, global warming, HIV/AIDS in Cuba and India, and press freedom in the Middle East. While producing a series of reports on global warming and other environmental issues, Yamaguchi traveled to Colombia and Bolivia for a series on coca cultivation and changing attitudes toward U.S. policy in the region.

Yamaguchi's Vanguard credits include an in-depth look at the Northern Mariana Islands and Saipan with the collapse of its largest industry, the manufacturing of textiles. The Vanguard documentary also featured a look at Japan's impending population collapse. In the Vanguard series, Yamaguchi also examined glacial melting in Greenland, as well as the crisis of public defecation in India.

Yamaguchi became a correspondent for CBS News in 2014. Two years later, he became an executive producer of longform documentaries, such as the Speaking Frankly and Reverb series for CBSN Originals.

== See also ==
- Christof Putzel
- Mariana van Zeller
