= Hitler and the Nazis: Evil on Trial =

- Genre: Docuseries
- Directed by: Joe Berlinger
- Composers: Vincent Pedulla; Serj Tankian
- Country of origin: United States
- Original language: English
- No. of seasons: 1
- No. of episodes: 6

Production
- Producers: Axel Gerdau; Matt Renner; Yoshi Stone; Kiana Cole; Eugen Braunig; Patrick Milling Smith; Tim Pastore
- Cinematography: Jeff Hutchens
- Editors: Cy Christiansen; Josh Earl; Kelly Kendrick; John Kilgour; Christopher Kronus; Victoria Toth
- Running time: 60 minutes
- Production companies: Smuggler Entertainment; Fireglory Pictures; Lions Productions

Original release
- Network: Netflix
- Release: June 5, 2024

Hitler and the Nazis: Evil on Trial is a 6-part American television documentary series about Hitler and the Nazi Party's rise to power in Germany before and during the Second World War and the aftermath of the regime's downfall. It was created for Netflix, directed by Joe Berlinger and produced by Smuggler Entertainment, Fireglory Pictures and Lions Productions. The series was released on June 5, 2024.

== Premise ==
Through interviews with historians and eyewitnesses, archival footage and audio, and dramatic historical reenactments, Hitler and the Nazis: Evil on Trial traces Hitler's rise to power and his leadership of Nazi Germany. The series is told through the perspective of American journalist William L. Shirer and his book The Rise and Fall of the Third Reich, published in 1960. The series made use of AI technology to create Shirer's "voice" as a narrator.

Berlinger has said he intended for the series to be a message to younger viewers and a warning that "normal people can do horrific things".

== Production ==
The series was directed by Joe Berlinger and executive producer was Matt Renner.

=== Cast ===
- Erik Gyercan as Young Adolf Hitler
- Karoly Kozma as Adolf Hitler
- Zora Gerda Fejes as Tess Shirer
- Tibor Toth as Rudolf Höss
- Istvan Danko as Heinrich Himmler
- Gabor Sotonyi as Hermann Göring
- Anna Szilvasi as Eva Braun
- Balazs Kato as William L. Shirer
- Lajos Szell Horvath as Joseph Goebbels
- Imre Csok as Erich von Manstein
- Figeczky Anna Eszter as Traudl Junge
- Domonkos Fellinger as Sir Hartley Shawcross
- Soma Zámbori as Joachim von Ribbentrop
- Klára Dér as Nazi Censor
- Szabolcs Jáger as Friedrich Paulus
- József Varga as Dr. Hans Laternser
- Imre Szabó as Alfred Jodl
- László Jászai as Ernst Röhm
- Norbert Varga as Otto Ohlendorf
- Szabolcs Radvánszki as Prisoner
- József Gulyás as Georg Neithardt
- Péter Tunyogi as Franz von Papen
- István Somogyi as Colonel John Harlan Amen
- István Czira as Alfred Rosenberg
- Zoltán Horváth as G.D. Roberts
- Zoltán Zsiga as Dr. Marx
- Péter Vigh as Dr. Stahmer
- József Ludmann as Lt. Col. Griffith Jones
- Balint Fenyvesi as Albert Speer
- Csaba Kádasi as Hans Frank
- Gábor Szalkai as David Maxwell-Fyfe
- József Keszthelyi as Hans Bernd Gisevius
- Csaba Mátyus as Julius Streicher
- Gergely Kovács as Reinhard Heydrich
- Zoltán Moldvay as Nazi Propaganda Officer
- József Pleszkán as Marinus van der Lubbe
- Martin Gyetvai as Helmut Goebbels
- Dániel Kanalas as Adolf Eichmann
- Tamás Mészáros as Kurt Schuschnigg
- Olga Kovács as Magda Goebbels
- Csaba Okrös as Claus von Stauffenberg
- Gergely Széchényi as Martin Bormann
- Szofi Kövári as Holdine Goebbels
- Zselyke Szonja Sáfrány as Hildegard Goebbels
- Zara Krausz as Helga Goebbels
- Kincsö Szófia Kömöci as Hedwig Goebbels
- Robert Jackson as Árpád Antolik

==== Contributors ====
- Alexandra Richie as self
- Benjamin Carter Hett as self
- Deirdre van Dyk as self
- Richard J. Evans as self
- Anne Berg as self
- Nicole Eaton as self
- Francine Hirsch as self
- Omer Bartov as self
- Steve Wick as self
- Christian Goeschel as self
- Christopher R. Browning as self
- Tiffany Florvil as self
- Lisa Pine as self
- Steven P. Remy as self
- Ken Cuthbertson as self
- Linda Shirer Rae as self
- Ingeborg Mayerhofer-Graf as self
- Walter Nachtigall as self
- Dávid Koltai as self
- Scott Alexander Young as self

== Episodes ==
No.	Title
1	"Origins of Evil"
Hitler's childhood in Austria is explored to show how his political ambitions were formed. Germany is thrown into sociopolitical turmoil after the end of the First World War.
2	"The Third Reich Rises"
Hitler builds a loyal following in the Nazi party through the rhetoric of his speeches and rises in the ranks of the party.
3	"Hitler in Power"
Hitler is in power as the Chancellor of the Third Reich and introduces a number of laws discriminating against Jewish people.
4	"The Road to Ruin"
Hitler sets out to expand Germany's territory in Europe and expands the Holocaust by building concentration camps.
5	"Crimes Against Humanity"
The German armed forces invade the Soviet Union and the Nazis begin the Final Solution.
6	"The Reckoning"
The Allied forces defeat Nazi Germany in 1945. With the fall of the Third Reich, the Allied Powers bring the Nazi party leaders to account at the Nuremberg trials.

== Reception ==
In a review for The New York Times, Mike Hale says the series alludes to Donald Trump's impact on the political landscape in America and writes "the focus is on how the personal drives the political, and you can’t watch “Evil on Trial” without considering how Berlinger’s and his colleagues’ feelings about Trump". Decider highlights the decision of Berlinger to frame the series around the context of the Nuremberg Trials and writes that this allows Berlinger "to put the rise of the Nazis and their atrocities in direct comparison to the consequences of the actions of the surviving Nazi higher-ups" and recommend audiences to stream the series. Screen Rant wrote that the series explores its subject matter "with immense depth and rigor" but stated it does not present any new evidence. The Tribune India awarded the series 4/5 stars and said it is "a powerful message conveyed through a power-packed presentation". Phil Harrison from The Guardian named the series as one of the seven best shows to stream on the week of its release, and said "this is a potent moment for a retelling of the story, as once again, totalitarianism seems to be rearing its head across the world, not least in the US."
