= NewsNation Prime =

American television news show

- Also known as: News Nation (alternate spelling); NewsNation Now (digital platforms)
- Genre: News program Current affairs
- Presented by: Natasha Zouves (for other staff, see section)
- Theme music composer: Stephen Arnold Music
- Opening theme: "NewsNation"
- Ending theme: "NewsNation"
- Country of origin: United States
- Original language: English
- No. of seasons: 1
- No. of episodes: 121

Production
- Production locations: WGN-TV Studios, Chicago
- Camera setup: Multi-camera
- Running time: 180 minutes
- Production company: Nexstar Media Group

Original release
- Network: WGN America (2020-2021); NewsNation (2021-present)
- Release: September 1, 2020 – present

NewsNation Prime is an American television news program on NewsNation, which premiered nationally on September 1, 2020. Broadcast live from Chicago, the program uses the journalistic resources of the 110 television news operations throughout the United States that are operated under the network's corporate parent Nexstar Media Group. The program is designed as an alternative to the opinion-based programs on CNN, MS-NOW and Fox News Channel, the top-rated cable news networks in the country in the early 2020s.

NewsNation Prime airs Saturdays and Sundays from 7 to 10 p.m. ET. (The program offers a same-night rebroadcast from 10 p.m. to 1 a.m. ET in order to align the program with the prime time period in the Pacific Time Zone.) The program combines reporting from its national correspondents and repackaged content from local Nexstar stations.

The program had an hour-long late-evening edition entitled NewsNation Tonight, which aired every weeknight from 11 p.m. to midnight ET.

== History ==
The genesis of the project was in October 2019, when Nexstar management commissioned viewer research that showed that Americans were dissatisfied with opinion-based programming on the cable news channels. CNN, which had previously shown straight news programming during the evening, moved into liberal-leaning personality-based programming under the leadership of Jeff Zucker, while MSNBC (which gravitated toward liberal opinion/talk programs beginning in 2008), conservative-leaning Fox News and One America News Network (the latter two networks have both used conservative talk shows) to anchor their prime time shows since the May 2004 cancellation of The News with Brian Williams and the Fox Report's relegation to a weekend-only telecast in October 2013.

Originally codenamed Project Neutral, on January 15, 2020, Nexstar announced the program, four months after the company closed on an acquisition of Tribune Media that encompassed much of the latter's broadcast and digital assets (including WGN America, which was the lone wholly owned property among Tribune's cable television assets and remains so as a Nexstar property), and greatly expanded Nexstar's broadcasting portfolio in the 50 largest U.S. television markets (adding stations in such major cities as Los Angeles, Chicago, Philadelphia and Houston).

The program was developed by Perry Sook and Sean Compton and under management of Jennifer Lyons, who was reassigned by Nexstar from her role as news director at its Chicago station WGN-TV to serve as WGN America's vice president of news, with the assistance of WGN America Executive Vice President Sean Compton. Former Fox News Channel chief and White House Deputy Chief of Staff Bill Shine was brought on as a consultant. NewsNation is the first national news effort to use WGN America as a platform since the channel—then operating as WGN-TV's superstation feed under the ownership of former parent Tribune—carried the similarly formatted Independent Network News from its premiere in June 1980 until the Tribune-distributed syndicated newscast ended in June 1990.

Upon its September 2020 premiere, NewsNation replaced acquired entertainment programming and movies that WGN America used to occupy prime time and early late-night timeslots. Because the program replaced syndicated programming that was scheduled to have their contracts expire or have their allotted timeslots reduced within the WGN America schedule, the cost of developing NewsNation and hiring personnel for the program is neutral to Nexstar.

The program was developed amid the COVID-19 pandemic in the United States and launched just before the 2020 United States presidential election. Nexstar hired "rhetoricians" to monitor the language used to describe events for neutrality, and is also providing significant weather coverage, which is, for the most part, not currently readily available on cable television (except for hurricanes and other major severe weather events, particularly as The Weather Channel currently shows weather-related entertainment and documentary programs in prime time, and all-weather-focused WeatherNation TV and AccuWeather Network have relatively limited pay television distribution).

Nexstar spent $20 million to build the operation, including a complete renovation of the WGN-TV studio facility in Chicago's North Center neighborhood. NewsNation's studio was built inside Studio 3, which was previously occupied by defunct regional cable news channel Chicagoland Television; the program's newsroom was built above WGN-TV's local newsroom, in space formerly occupied by sister AM radio station WGN. The company also spent $100 million in advertising for the September 2020 launch, including a 28-minute behind-the-scenes program which was uploaded on WGN America's YouTube and Facebook platforms on August 17, 2020, and aired commercial-free on WGN America and on Nexstar stations during the weekend of August 29.

To prevent preconceived viewer impressions based on their past work, Compton and Lyons hired journalists with experience rooted mainly in local television news to be part of the program's in-house staff of anchors, correspondents and meteorologists. Compton told the Los Angeles Times in June 2020, “We just hired local journalists who have not been at opinionated networks because let's face it, the big three news channels are all opinionated — two on the left, one on the right. We want them to come from local stations which tend to report facts and let you come to your own opinion.” By its launch, NewsNation hired 150 people in Chicago and bureaus in Los Angeles, Miami, New York City, Washington, D.C. and Dallas. The program also uses reporting from local Nexstar stations. Nexstar required that its local stations withhold breaking news footage from competing networks in order to give NewsNation right of first coverage; the move led CNN to terminate a video sharing agreement that granted Nexstar's 197 stations access to content from its CNN Newsource video wire service.

Over the first month, ratings reached approximately 100,000 viewers per night, approximately in line with the viewership of syndicated reruns and first-run programming that had previously occupied the timeslot. However, average ratings—factoring drop-offs from first-week sampling—fell below 100,000 viewers for its second and third hours following its premiere week. The program saw a ratings high for anchor Joe Donlon's September 22, 2020, interview with President Donald Trump, which peaked at 218,000 viewers for the 8:00 p.m. ET hour, before falling to 54,000 viewers for that night's third hour. Ratings in the 25-54 demographic prized by advertisers have been especially low, with an average of 15,000 viewers, less than one-sixth of the amount thought to be successful.

Since its launch, NewsNation has been criticized for a rightward tilt in its guests and for hiring former Fox News Channel chief and White House Deputy Chief of Staff Bill Shine as a consultant. The news director and managing editor quit following disclosure of Shine's role. Lyons announced her resignation in March amid growing concern that the channel would lean rightward and minuscule ratings for the network.

Starting March 1, 2021, the final hour of NewsNation was branded Banfield as veteran journalist Ashleigh Banfield started hosting an interview program under the NewsNation banner. The WGN America network was re-branded as NewsNation and included new programming: NewsNation Early Edition, hosted by Nichole Berlie at 6 p.m. ET, and The Donlon Report, anchored by Joe Donlon at 7 p.m. ET. The two-hour NewsNation broadcast was renamed NewsNationPrime .

On July 19, 2021, the first hour of NewsNation Prime was branded as On Balance with Leland Vittert. In 2022 Vittert and Marni Hughes started hosting the 11 p.m. newscast. Hughes later left the nightly show to host the live daytime news broadcast.

On October 3, 2022, Chris Cuomo, formerly of CNN, debuted an eponymous commentary show.

== Digital content ==
The digital platform, which provides supplemental content to that which is featured on the television broadcast, is branded as NewsNation Now. The platform's app includes audio updates—consisting of news summaries (similar to the top-of-the-hour national summaries played on affiliates of syndicated radio news providers) and single-story segments—produced by Nexstar-owned news/talk radio station WGN in Chicago, which dropped its decades-long ABC News Radio affiliation amid NewsNation's launch.

To promote the newscast, WGN America offered viewers unrestricted access to the livestream of the program's live broadcast and rebroadcast in 2020; following the promotional period, the program is only accessible via provider login to subscribers who receive WGN America through cable, satellite and wireline-style IPTV providers. Already on AT&T TV Now, WGN America was added to most virtual MVPD services in January 2021, including YouTube TV, Sling TV, Hulu and FuboTV. In late September 2020, select Nexstar-run MyNetworkTV and independent stations—such as WMYT-TV/Charlotte and KAUT-TV/Oklahoma City—began offering preview simulcasts of the first hour of NewsNation.

== On-air staff ==
=== Notable current on-air talent ===
- Dan Abrams – weeknight host of Dan Abrams Live (formerly of MSNBC)
- Ashleigh Banfield – weeknight host of Banfield (formerly of ABC News, CNN, HLN, MSNBC and NBC News)
- Adrienne Bankert – national correspondent/morning anchor of Morning in America (TV program) (formerly of KCRA-TV, KTVT, and ABC News)
- Nichole Berlie – weeknight anchor of NewsNation Rush Hour(formerly of WCVB-TV)
- Keleigh Beeson – national correspondent (formerly of KMBC-TV)
- Aleksandra Bush – NewsNation Now anchor/producer (formerly of WGHP)
- Alex Caprariello – West Coast correspondent of Morning in America (formerly of KXAN-TV and KNWA-TV)
- Dray Clark – national correspondent (formerly of Black News Channel)
- Tom Dempsey – Washington D.C. correspondent (formerly of WHSV-TV)
- Ileana Diaz – Miami correspondent of Morning in America (formerly of KNBC, WUSA (TV), and KYW-TV)
- Brian Entin – senior national correspondent (formerly of WSVN)
- Sloane Glass – entertainment correspondent of Morning in America (formerly of WAGA-TV)
- Allison Harris – White House correspondent (formerly of KDFW)
- Marni Hughes – weekday anchor of NewsNation Live (formerly of KCPQ)
- Marley Kayden – business correspondent (formerly of WGN-TV, & WMAQ-TV)
- Joe Khalil – Capitol Hill reporter (formerly of WLNS-TV)
- Kelsey Kernstine – Chicago correspondent (formerly of KWTV-DT)
- Evan Lambert – Washington D.C. and political correspondent (formerly of WTTG)
- Nancy Loo – West Coast bureau correspondent (formerly of WGN-TV, WFLD and WABC-TV)
- Rich McHugh – Investigative correspondent (formerly of Fox News, MSNBC, ABC News and NBC News)
- Aaron Nolan – Mid-South correspondent of Morning in America (formerly of KARK-TV)
- Kellie Meyer – Washington correspondent (formerly of WENY-TV)
- Markie Martin – Dallas bureau correspondent (formerly of KOCO-TV)
- Tom Negovan – New York City bureau correspondent (formerly of WGN-TV and KYW-TV)
- Brooke Shafer – Miami correspondent (formerly of WFOR-TV)
- Robert Sherman (journalist) – foreign correspondent (formerly of Fox News)
- Nick Smith – Midwest correspondent of Morning in America (formerly of WTTG, and WTVD)
- Leland Vittert – national correspondent/weeknight anchor of On Balance with Leland Vittert (formerly of Fox News)
- Natasha Zouves – weekend anchor/correspondent (formerly of KGO-TV)

=== Notable former on-air talent ===
- Felicia Bolton
- Mitch Carr
- Elizabeth Chmurak
- Joe Donlon (now at WBBM-TV)
- Janel Forte
- Paul Gerke
- Gerard Jebaily (later at WBBM-TV, now at WBFF)
- Ashley Ketz
- Rob Nelson (now at Newsy)
- Albert Ramon (now at WBBM-TV)
- Dean Reynolds
- Rudabeh Shahbazi
- Michael Shure
- Ji Suk Yi
