= Nawal Al-Maghafi =

Yemeni-British journalist and filmmaker

- Born: 1990 (age 35–36)
- Education: University of Nottingham
- Employer: BBC

Nawal Al-Maghafi (born 1990) is a Yemeni-British broadcast journalist and documentary maker who has worked for the BBC since 2011. She has been an international correspondent on BBC Newsnight since May 2023.

She has covered conflicts, human rights abuses, and geopolitical issues, with a focus on Yemen and the broader Middle East. Her reporting has extensively covered the ongoing civil war and humanitarian crisis in Yemen. Her work often highlights the experiences of civilians.

Al-Maghafi has won three News and Documentary Emmy Awards for her documentaries.

== Personal life ==
Al-Maghafi was raised in Yemen. She attended the University of Nottingham, where she earned a degree in Economics with Politics.

== Career ==
=== Journalism ===
After completing university, Al-Maghafi returned to Yemen, where she began making videos about the Yemeni revolution in 2011. That year she also interviewed then-Yemeni President Ali Abdullah Saleh. She later interviewed Ali Al Imad and figureheads in the Houthi insurgency. In 2015, Al-Maghafi covered the peace talks between Houthi and General People's Congress delegates in Switzerland. Al-Maghafi continued her reporting in Yemen during the COVID-19 pandemic, with her reports discussing the government cover-ups of cases in the country. She later produced a documentary, Yemen’s Covid Cover Up, from her reporting.

Al-Maghafi joined the BBC in 2011, where she produced reports on Yemen for BBC News at Ten, BBC Our World and BBC Arabic. In 2018, Al-Maghafi was nominated for the Royal Television Society's Young Talent of the Year award. She joined BBC Newsnight in May 2023 as an international correspondent.

=== Documentaries ===
Al-Maghafi's 2016 documentary, Starving Yemen, explored the on-going humanitarian crisis in Yemen, caused by bombing in the Yemeni civil war. Her 2017 documentary, The Funeral Bombing, focused on a 2016 airstrike on a funeral in Sanaa.

Her 2019 documentary, Iraq’s Secret Sex Trade, won two News and Documentary Emmy Awards in 2020 in the categories Outstanding Investigative Report in a Newsmagazine and Best Story in a Newsmagazine.

In 2022, Al-Maghafi's documentary Yemen’s Covid Cover Up won an News and Documentary Emmy Award in the category Outstanding Investigative News Coverage: Long Form.

In 2023, Al-Maghafi released This World: Murder in Mayfair, a documentary exploring the 2008 murder of Martine Vik Magnussen in London.
