= Lori Jane Gliha =

American television journalist

- Born: Ohio
- Education: University of Southern California (BA)
- Occupation: Journalist
- Years active: 2002–present
- Title: America Tonight correspondent Al Jazeera America

Lori Jane Gliha is an American television journalist.

== Career ==
A native of Ohio, Gliha attended the Annenberg School for Communication at the University of Southern California between 1998 and 2002. Gliha graduated summa cum laude as the outstanding broadcast journalism undergraduate from University of Southern California. She worked at WILX-TV in Lansing, Michigan; WNEM-TV in Saginaw, Michigan; and KNXV-TV in Phoenix, where she spent six years as an investigative reporter and weekend evening anchor.

In 2013, Gliha joined Al Jazeera America's flagship show America Tonight, serving as one of the network's first national correspondents. Based out of Washington, D.C., she covered stories across the country in addition to reporting in studio along with anchor Joie Chen.

After Al Jazeera America closed, she joined the investigative team at Insight with John Ferrugia, a production of Rocky Mountain PBS in Denver. A piece she reported on child sex trafficking in Colorado, "Traded and Trafficked", was nominated for a national News & Documentary Emmy. In 2019, she joined the investigative reporting team at KDVR in that city. In 2021, her feature story reporting on ketamine in Colorado received a national Edward R. Murrow Award and Gracie Award.
